= List of PlayStation 2 games (L–Z) =

This is a continued list of games for the Sony PlayStation 2 video game system. Title names may be different for each region due to the first language spoken.

== Games list (L–Z) ==
There are currently 4344 games across both this page (L to Z) and the list from A to K.

Title	Developer	Publisher	First released	JP	EU^{/ PAL}	NA
L no Kisetsu 2: Invisible Memories	5pb	5pb	2008-07-03^{JP}	Yes		
L2: Love x Loop	Otomate	Idea Factory	2009-08-20^{JP}	Yes		
La Corda d'Oro •Kiniro no Corda: La Corda d'Oro^{JP}	Koei	Koei	2004-03-18^{JP}	Yes		
La Pucelle: Tactics •La Pucelle^{JP, KO} •La Pucelle: Hikari no Seijo Densetsu Nishū^{JP}	Nippon Ichi Software	Nippon Ichi Software^{JP, KO}, Mastiff^{NA}, Koei^{PAL}	2002-01-31^{JP}	Yes ^{JP, KO}	Yes	Yes
L.A. Rush	Midway Games	Midway Games	2005-10-11^{NA}		Yes	Yes
Lake Masters EX	Dazz	Dazz^{JP}, Midas Interactive Entertainment^{EU}	2000-12-14^{JP}	Yes	Yes	
Lake Masters EX Super	Dazz	Dazz	2001-07-19^{JP}	Yes		
Langrisser III	Taito	Taito	2005-10-27^{JP}	Yes		
Largo Winch: Empire Under Threat	Ubisoft Paris	Ubisoft	2002-09-06^{EU}		Yes	
Lassie	EM Studios	Blast! Entertainment Ltd	2007-10-26^{EU}		Yes	
Last Escort 2: Shinya no Amai Toge	Vingt-et-un Systems	D3 Publisher	2008-02-21^{JP}	Yes		
Last Escort: Club Katze	Mobile & Gamestudio	D3 Publisher	2010-02-18^{JP}	Yes		
Last Escort: Kokuchou Special Night (Note: stand-alone expansion for Last Escort: Shinya no Kokuchou Monogatari.)	Vingt-et-un Systems	D3 Publisher	2006-07-27^{JP}	Yes		
Last Escort: Shinya no Kokuchou Monogatari	Vingt-et-un Systems	D3 Publisher	2006-01-26^{JP}	Yes		
Le Mans 24 Hours	Infogrames Melbourne House	Infogrames^{EU, NA}, Sega^{JP}	2001-06-22^{EU}	Yes	Yes	Yes
Le Tour de France	Konami	Konami	2002-06-21^{EU}		Yes	
Le Tour de France: Centenary Edition	DC Studios	Konami	2003-06-27^{EU}		Yes	
Leaderboard Golf	Aqua Pacific	Midas Interactive Entertainment	2006-03-31^{EU}		Yes	
League Series Baseball 2 •Magical Sports 2001 Koushien^{JP}	Mahou	Mahou^{JP}, Midas Interactive Entertainment^{EU}	2001-05-31^{JP}	Yes	Yes	
Legacy of Kain: Defiance	Crystal Dynamics	Eidos Interactive	2003-11-11^{NA}		Yes	Yes
Legaia 2: Duel Saga •Legaia: Duel Saga^{JP}	Prokion	Sony Computer Entertainment^{JP}, Eidos Interactive^{EU, NA}	2001-11-29^{JP}	Yes	Yes	Yes
The Legend of Alon D'ar	Stormfront Studios	Ubisoft	2001-12-04^{NA}			Yes
Legend of Camelot	Phoenix Games	Phoenix Games	2007^{EU}		Yes	
Legend of Herkules	Phoenix Games	Phoenix Games	2007^{EU}		Yes	
Legend of Kay	Neon Studios	JoWooD Productions^{EU}, Capcom^{NA}	2005-03-04^{EU}		Yes	Yes
The Legend of Spyro: A New Beginning	Krome Studios	Sierra Entertainment	2006-10-10^{NA}		Yes	Yes
The Legend of Spyro: Dawn of the Dragon	Etranges Libellules	Activision^{NA}, Sierra Entertainment^{PAL}	2008-10-21^{NA}		Yes	Yes
The Legend of Spyro: The Eternal Night	Krome Studios	Sierra Entertainment	2007-10-02^{NA}		Yes	Yes
Legend of the Dragon	Neko Entertainment	The Game Factory	2007-05-01^{NA}		Yes	Yes
Legends of Wrestling	Acclaim Studios Salt Lake City	Acclaim Entertainment	2001-12-03^{NA}		Yes	Yes
Legends of Wrestling II	Acclaim Studios Salt Lake City	Acclaim Entertainment	2002-11-26^{NA}		Yes	Yes
Legendz Gekitou! Saga Battle	Bandai	Bandai	2004-12-16^{JP}	Yes		
Legion: Legend of Excalibur	7 Studios	Midway Games	2002-06-18^{NA}		Yes	Yes
Lego Batman: The Videogame	Traveller's Tales	Warner Bros. Interactive Entertainment^{NA, PAL}, Activision^{JP}	2008-09-23^{NA}	Yes	Yes	Yes
Lego Indiana Jones: The Original Adventures	Traveller's Tales	LucasArts	2008-06-03^{NA}		Yes	Yes
Lego Racers 2	Attention to Detail	Lego Software^{EU, NA}, Taito^{JP}	2001-09-27^{NA}	Yes	Yes	Yes
Lego Star Wars II: The Original Trilogy	Traveller's Tales	LucasArts^{NA, PAL}, Electronic Arts^{JP}	2006-09-12^{NA}	Yes	Yes	Yes
Lego Star Wars: The Video Game	Traveller's Tales	Eidos Interactive, Giant Interactive Entertainment	2005-04-02^{NA}	Yes	Yes	Yes
Leisure Suit Larry: Magna Cum Laude	High Voltage Software	Vivendi Universal Games	2004-10-05^{NA}		Yes	Yes
Lemmings	Team17	Sony Computer Entertainment	2006-10-13^{PAL}		Yes	
Lemony Snicket's A Series of Unfortunate Events	Adrenium Games	Activision	2004-11-10^{NA}		Yes	Yes
L'Eredita	Milestone S.r.l	Sony Computer Entertainment	2003-12-03^{EU}		Yes	
Lethal Skies Elite Pilot: Team SW •SideWinder F^{JP}	Asmik Ace Entertainment	Asmik Ace Entertainment	2001-12-13^{JP}	Yes	Yes	Yes
Lethal Skies II •SideWinder V^{JP}	Asmik Ace Entertainment	Asmik Ace Entertainment^{JP}, Sammy^{EU, NA}	2003-08-21^{JP}		Yes	Yes
Let's Bravo Music	Desert Productions	Sony Computer Entertainment	2002-12-12^{JP}	Yes		
Let's Make a Soccer Team! •Pro Soccer Club o Tsukurou! Europe Championship^{JP}	Snilebit	Sega	2006-03-29^{JP}	Yes	Yes	
Let's Ride: Silver Buckle Stables	Coresoft	THQ	2006-03-14^{NA}		Yes	Yes
Lifeline •Operator's Side^{JP}	Sony Computer Entertainment	Sony Computer Entertainment^{JP}, Konami^{NA}	2003-01-30^{JP}	Yes		Yes
Like Life An Hour	Regista	GN Software	2005-04-28^{JP}	Yes		
Lilie no Atelier Plus: Salberg no Renkinjutsushi 3 (Note: update for Lilie no Atelier: Salberg no Renkinjutsushi 3.)	Gust	Gust	2002-04-04^{JP}	Yes		
Lilie no Atelier: Salberg no Renkinjutsushi 3	Gust	Gust	2002-04-04^{JP}	Yes		
Little Aid	Takuyo	Takuyo	2005-11-23^{JP}	Yes		
Little Anchor	Vridge	D3 Publisher	2009-04-23^{JP}	Yes		
Little Britain: The Video Game	Gamerholix, Gamesauce	Mastertronic^{AU}, Blast! Entertainment Ltd^{EU}	2007-02-01^{AU}		Yes	
Little Busters! Converted Edition	Key	Prototype	2009-12-24^{JP}	Yes		
Living World Racing	Data Design Interactive	Metro3D	2006-02-28^{EU}		Yes	
LMA Manager 2002 •BDFL Manager 2002^{DE} •Roger Lemerre: La Selection des Champions 2002^{FR}	Codemasters	Codemasters	2002-04-19^{EU}		Yes	
LMA Manager 2003 •BDFL Manager 2003^{DE} •Roger Lemerre: La Selection des Champions 2003^{FR}	Codemasters	Codemasters	2002-11-15^{EU}		Yes	
LMA Manager 2004 •BDFL Manager 2004^{DE}	Codemasters	Codemasters	2004-03-12^{EU}		Yes	
LMA Manager 2005 •BDFL Manager 2005^{DE} •Manchester United Manager 2005^{UK} •Roger Lemerre: La Selection des Champions 2005^{FR}	Codemasters	Codemasters	2004-10-22^{EU}		Yes	
LMA Manager 2006 •BDFL Manager 2006^{DE}	Codemasters	Codemasters	2005-11-18^{EU}		Yes	
LMA Manager 2007 •BDFL Manager 2007^{DE}	Codemasters	Codemasters	2006-09-22^{EU}		Yes	
London Cab Challenge	Phoenix Games	Phoenix Games	2006-07-28^{EU}		Yes	
London Racer: Destruction Madness •Paris-Marseille Racing: Destruction Madness^{FR} •Autobahn Raser: Destruction Madness^{DE}	Davilex Games	Davilex Games	2005-10-14^{EU}		Yes	
London Racer II •Paris-Marseille Racing II^{FR}	Davilex Games	Davilex Games	2002-06-14^{EU}		Yes	
London Racer: Police Madness •Paris-Marseille Racing: Police Madness^{FR} •Autobahn Raser: Police Madness^{DE}	Davilex Games	Davilex Games	2005-10-28^{EU}		Yes	
London Racer: World Challenge •Paris-Marseille Racing: World Challenge^{FR} •Autobahn Raser: World Challenge^{DE}	Davilex Games	Davilex Games	2003-09-19^{EU}		Yes	
London Taxi: Rush Hour	Data Design Interactive	Metro3D	2006-01-07^{EU}		Yes	
Looney Tunes: Acme Arsenal	Redtribe	Warner Bros. Interactive Entertainment	2007-10-09^{NA}		Yes	Yes
Looney Tunes: Back in Action	Warthog Games	Electronic Arts	2003-11-19^{NA}		Yes	Yes
The Lord of the Rings: Aragorn's Quest	TT Fusion	Warner Bros. Interactive Entertainment	2010-09-14^{NA}		Yes	Yes
The Lord of the Rings: The Fellowship of the Ring	Surreal Software	Black Label Games	2002-10-15^{NA}		Yes	Yes
The Lord of the Rings: The Return of the King	EA Redwood Shores	Electronic Arts	2003-11-05^{NA}	Yes	Yes	Yes
The Lord of the Rings: The Third Age	EA Redwood Shores	Electronic Arts	2004-11-02^{NA}	Yes	Yes	Yes
The Lord of the Rings: The Two Towers	Stormfront Studios	Electronic Arts	2002-10-21^{NA}	Yes	Yes	Yes
Lost Aya Sophia	Idea Factory	Idea Factory	2004-05-27^{JP}	Yes		
Lost Passage: Ushinawareta Hitofushi	PrincessSoft	PrincessSoft	2003-10-23^{JP}	Yes		
Lotus Challenge	Kuju Entertainment	Virgin Interactive^{EU}, MTO^{JP}	2001-11-02^{EU}	Yes	Yes	
Love Doll: Lovely Idol	PrincessSoft	PrincessSoft	2005-04-28^{JP}	Yes		
Love Drops	PrincessSoft	PrincessSoft	2007-05-31^{JP}	Yes		
Love Hina Gorgeous: Chiratto Happening!!	Konami	Konami	2003-05-22^{JP}	Yes		
Love Songs: ADV Futaba Riho 14-sai Natsu	HuneX	D3 Publisher	2004-09-30^{JP}	Yes		
Love Songs: ADV Futaba Riho 19-sai Fuyu	HuneX	D3 Publisher	2004-11-03^{JP}	Yes		
Love Songs: Idol ga Classmate	HuneX	D3 Publisher	2001-04-26^{JP}	Yes		
Love Story •Ø Story^{JP}	General Entertainment	Enix	2000-04-27^{JP}	Yes		
Love*Com: Punch de Court	AQ Interactive	AQ Interactive	2006-07-13^{JP}	Yes		
Love*Mahjong •Simple 2000 Ultimate Series Vol. 5: Love * Mahjong^{JP}	HuneX	D3 Publisher	2002-11-14^{JP}	Yes		
Love*Mahjong 2 •Simple 2000 Ultimate Series Vol. 20: Love * Mahjong! 2^{JP}	HuneX	D3 Publisher	2004-10-14^{JP}	Yes		
Loveroot Zero: Kiss Kiss * Labyrinth	Dimple Entertainment	Dimple Entertainment	2010-04-28^{JP}	Yes		
Love*Smash! 5	HuneX	D3 Publisher	2003-11-13^{JP}	Yes		
Love*Smash! 5.1 ~Tennis Robo no Hanran~ •Simple 2000 Ultimate Series Vol. 26: Love * Smash! 5.1: Tennis Robo no Hanran^{JP} (Note: update for Love*Smash! 5.)	HuneX	D3 Publisher	2005-06-23^{JP}	Yes		
Love*Smash! Super Tennis Players •Simple 2000 Ultimate Series Vol. 1: Love * Smash!^{JP}	HuneX	D3 Publisher	2002-01-17^{JP}	Yes		
Love*Songs •Simple 2000 Ultimate Series Vol. 10: Love*Songs^{JP}	HuneX	D3 Publisher	2003-08-14^{JP}	Yes		
Lowrider •LowRider: Round the World^{JP}	Pacific Century Cyber Works	Pacific Century Cyber Works^{JP}, Jaleco^{NA}	2002-12-19^{JP}	Yes		Yes
Lucian Bee's: Evil Violet (Note: stand-alone expansion for Lucian Bee's: Resurrection Supernova.)	HuneX	5pb	2010-05-20^{JP}	Yes		
Lucian Bee's: Justice Yellow (Note: stand-alone expansion for Lucian Bee's: Resurrection Supernova.)	HuneX	5pb	2010-05-20^{JP}	Yes		
Lucian Bee's: Resurrection Supernova	HuneX	5pb	2009-07-30^{JP}	Yes		
Lucinda Green's Equestrian Challenge	2Wg	Red Mile Entertainment^{NA}, Codemasters^{EU}	2006-11-15^{NA}		Yes	Yes
Lucky*Star: Ryouou Gakuen Outousai	Vridge	Kadokawa Games	2008-01-24^{JP}	Yes		
LuluRara vol.1	Studio9	Sony Computer Entertainment	2005-12-08^{KO}	Yes ^{KO}		
LuluRara vol.2	Studio9	Sony Computer Entertainment	2006-05-11^{KO}	Yes ^{KO}		
Lumines Plus	Q Entertainment	Buena Vista Games	2007-02-16^{EU}		Yes	Yes
Lunatic Dawn Tempest	Artdink	Artdink	2001-02-08^{JP}	Yes		
Lupin Sansei: Columbus no Isan wa Akenisomaru	Nex Entertainment	Banpresto	2004-11-25^{JP}	Yes		
Lupin Sansei: Lupin ni wa Shi o, Zenigata ni wa Koi o •Le avventure di "Lupin III": Lupin la morte, Zenigata l'amore^{FR}	Nex Entertainment	Banpresto^{JP}, 505 Game Street^{FR}	2007-02-22^{JP}	Yes	Yes ^{FR}	
Lupin the 3rd: Treasure of the Sorcerer King	Banpresto	Banpresto^{JP}, Bandai^{NA}, 505 Game Street^{EU}	2002-11-28^{JP}	Yes	Yes	Yes
Luxor: Pharaoh's Challenge	MumboJumbo	MumboJumbo	2007-11-20^{NA}		Yes	Yes
Mabino Style	KID	KID	2005-04-28^{JP}	Yes		
Mace Griffin: Bounty Hunter	Warthog Games	Black Label Games	2003-06-17^{NA}		Yes	Yes
Mad Maestro! •Bravo Music^{JP}	Desert Productions	Sony Computer Entertainment^{JP}, Eidos Interactive^{EU, NA}	2001-10-11^{JP}	Yes	Yes	Yes
Madagascar: Escape 2 Africa	Idol Minds	Activision	2008-11-04^{NA}		Yes	Yes
Madden NFL 06	EA Tiburon	EA Sports	2005-08-08^{NA}	Yes	Yes	Yes
Madden NFL 07 •Madden NFL 07 (Hall of Fame Edition)^{NA} (different version)	EA Tiburon	EA Sports	2006-08-22^{NA}	Yes	Yes	Yes
Madden NFL 08 •Madden NFL 08 en Español^{NA}	EA Tiburon	EA Sports	2007-08-14^{NA}	Yes	Yes	Yes
Madden NFL 09	EA Tiburon	EA Sports	2008-08-12^{NA}		Yes	Yes
Madden NFL 10	EA Tiburon	EA Sports	2009-08-14^{NA}			Yes
Madden NFL 11	EA Tiburon	EA Sports	2010-08-10^{NA}			Yes
Madden NFL 12	EA Tiburon	EA Sports	2011-08-30^{NA}			Yes
Madden NFL 2001 •Madden NFL Super Bowel 2001^{JP}	EA Tiburon	EA Sports	2000-10-23^{NA}	Yes	Yes	Yes
Madden NFL 2002 •Madden NFL Super Bowel 2002^{JP}	EA Tiburon	EA Sports	2001-08-19^{NA}	Yes	Yes	Yes
Madden NFL 2003 •Madden NFL Super Bowel 2003^{JP}	EA Tiburon	EA Sports	2002-08-12^{NA}	Yes	Yes	Yes
Madden NFL 2004	EA Tiburon	EA Sports	2003-08-12^{NA}	Yes ^{KO}	Yes	Yes
Madden NFL 2005 •Madden NFL 2005 Collector's Edition^{NA} (different version) •Madden NFL Super Bowel 2005^{JP}	EA Tiburon	EA Sports	2004-08-09^{NA}	Yes	Yes	Yes
Made Man: Confessions of the Family Blood •Made Man^{EU}	SilverBack Studios	Mastertronic Group Ltd.^{EU}, Aspyr Media, Inc.^{NA}	2006-11-30^{EU}		Yes	Yes
The Maestromusic II	Global A	Global A	2001-08-02^{JP}	Yes		
Mafia	Illusion Softworks	Gathering of Developers^{NA}, Illusion Softworks^{EU}	2004-01-27^{NA}		Yes	Yes
Mageru Tsukeru Hahiiru: Ore * Dead Heat	Success	Success	2002-08-01^{JP}	Yes		
Ma-Gi: Marginal	PrincessSoft	PrincessSoft	2003-07-17^{JP}	Yes		
Magic Pengel: The Quest for Color	Taito	Taito^{JP}, Agetec^{NA}	2002-03-20^{JP}	Yes		Yes
Magical Pachinko Cotton: Pachinko Jūki Simulation	Success	Success	2003-05-01^{JP}	Yes		
Magical Sports 2000 Koushien	Mahou	Mahou	2000-08-10^{JP}	Yes		
Magical Tale: Chitchana Mahoutsukai	PrincessSoft	PrincessSoft	2005-05-12^{JP}	Yes		
The Magician's Academy	Enterbrain	Enterbrain	2007-06-07^{JP}	Yes		
Magna Carta: Tears of Blood •Magna Carta: Crimson Stigmata^{JP} •Magna Carta^{EU}	Softmax	Banpresto^{JP}, Atlus^{NA}, 505 Game Street^{EU}	2004-11-11^{JP}	Yes	Yes	Yes
Mahjong	Success	Success	2003-07-31^{JP}	Yes		
The Mahjong •Simple 2000 Honkaku Shikou Series Vol. 4: The Mahjong^{JP}	Warashi	D3 Publisher	2002-07-25^{JP}	Yes		
Mahjong Gokū Taisei	Artdink	Artdink	2000-11-02^{JP}	Yes		
Mahjong Haoh: Battle Royale	NCS	NCS	2005-07-14^{JP}	Yes		
Mahjong Haoh: Dankyū Battle II	NCS	NCS	2006-04-13^{JP}	Yes		
Mahjong Haoh: Jansou Battle	Mycom	Mycom	2001-12-27^{JP}	Yes		
Mahjong Haoh: Kaikyū Battle	Mycom	Mycom	2002-10-10^{JP}	Yes		
Mahjong Haoh: Shinken Battle	NCS	NCS	2004-05-27^{JP}	Yes		
Mahjong Haoh: Taikai Battle	Mycom	Mycom	2003-09-25^{JP}	Yes		
Mahjong Hiryu Densetsu: Tenpai	Nippon Telenet	Nippon Telenet	2003-08-28^{JP}	Yes		
Mahjong Party: Idol to Mahjong Shoubu •Mahjong Party: Swimming Suit Beauty^{AS}	Nippon Telenet	Nippon Telenet	2004-03-25^{JP}	Yes ^{AS, JP}		
Mahjong San Goku Shi	Mycom	Mycom	2004-12-16^{JP}	Yes		
Mahjong Sengen Kyoujin de Ron!	Taito	Taito	2000-12-14^{JP}	Yes		
Mahjong Taikai III	Koei	Koei	2000-03-04^{JP}	Yes		
Mahjong Yarouze! 2	Konami	Konami	2000-04-13^{JP}	Yes		
Mahoroba Stories	Dimple Entertainment	Dimple Entertainment	2007-07-26^{JP}	Yes		
Mahoromatic: Moetto - KiraKira Maid-San	Konami	Konami	2003-07-31^{JP}	Yes		
Mahou Sensei Negima! 1-Jikanme ~Okochama Sensei wa Mahoutsukai!~	Konami	Konami	2005-01-20^{JP}	Yes		
Mahou Sensei Negima! 2-Jikanme ~Tatakau Otometachi! Mahora Daiundokai SP~	Konami	Konami	2005-07-28^{JP}	Yes		
Mahou Sensei Negima! Kagai Jugyou ~Otome no Dokidoki Beachside~	Konami	Konami	2006-03-23^{JP}	Yes		
Mahou Tsukai Kurohime	Tomy	Tomy	2006-03-30^{JP}	Yes		
The Maid Fuku to Kikanjū •Simple 2000 Series Vol. 105: The Maid Fuku to Kikanjū^{JP}	Rideon Japan Inc.	D3 Publisher	2006-08-10^{JP}	Yes		
Mai-HiME: Unmei no Keitouju	Marvelous Entertainment	Marvelous Entertainment	2005-06-30^{JP}	Yes		
Mai-Otome Hime: Otome Butou Shi	Sunrise Interactive	Sunrise Interactive	2006-11-09^{JP}	Yes		
Majin Tantei Nougami Neuro: Battle da Yo!	Compile Heart	Compile Heart	2008-08-28^{JP}	Yes		
Majokko A La Mode	F&C	Interchannel	2004-11-25^{JP}	Yes		
Majokko A La Mode II	GN Software	GN Software	2007-06-28^{JP}	Yes		
Major League Baseball 2K10	Visual Concepts	2K Sports	2010-03-02^{NA}			Yes
Major League Baseball 2K11	Visual Concepts	2K Sports	2011-03-08^{NA}			Yes
Major League Baseball 2K12	Visual Concepts	Take-Two Interactive	2012-03-06^{NA}			Yes
Major League Baseball 2K5 • Major League Baseball 2K5: World Series Edition (different version)	Kush Games	2K Sports	2005-02-28^{NA}			Yes
Major League Baseball 2K6	Kush Games	2K Sports^{NA}, Spike^{JP}	2006-04-03^{NA}	Yes		Yes
Major League Baseball 2K7	Kush Games	2K Sports^{NA}, Spike^{JP}	2007-02-26^{NA}	Yes		Yes
Major League Baseball 2K8	Kush Games	2K Sports^{NA}, CyberFront^{JP}	2008-03-03^{NA}	Yes		Yes
Major League Baseball 2K9	Visual Concepts	2K Sports^{NA}, Spike^{JP}	2009-03-03^{NA}	Yes		Yes
Makai Kingdom: Chronicles Of The Sacred Tome •Phantom Kingdom^{JP}	Nippon Ichi Software	Nippon Ichi Software^{JP, NA}, Koei^{EU}	2005-03-17^{JP}	Yes	Yes	Yes
Makai Tenshou •Simple 2000 Ultimate Series Vol. 24: Makai Tenshou^{JP}	Tamsoft	D3 Publisher	2003-07-31^{JP}	Yes		
Maken Shao: Demon Sword •Maken Shao^{JP}	Atlus	Atlus^{JP}, Midas Interactive Entertainment^{EU}	2001-06-07^{JP}	Yes	Yes	
Malice	Argonaut Games	Evolved Games^{EU}, Mud Duck Productions^{NA}	2004-04-08^{EU}		Yes	Yes
Mambo	Phoenix Games	Phoenix Games	2007^{EU}		Yes	
Mamimune * Mogacho no Print Hour	Idea Factory	Idea Factory	2000-12-21^{JP}	Yes		
Mana Khemia 2: Fall of Alchemy •Mana Khemia 2: Ochita Gakuen to Renkinjutsushi Tachi^{JP}	Gust	Gust^{JP}, NIS America^{NA}	2008-05-29^{JP}	Yes		Yes
Mana Khemia: Alchemists of Al-Revis •Mana-Khemia: Gakuen no Renkinjutsushi-tachi^{JP}	Gust	Gust^{JP}, NIS America^{NA}, NIS Europe^{EU}	2007-06-21^{JP}	Yes	Yes	Yes
Manea Sugoroku: Kabukuro	Ertain	Ertain	2007-11-15^{JP}	Yes		
Manhunt	Rockstar North	Rockstar Games	2003-11-18^{NA}		Yes	Yes
Manhunt 2	Rockstar London	Rockstar Games	2007-10-29^{NA}		Yes	Yes
Maniac Mole	Phoenix Games	Phoenix Games	2006-07-28^{EU}		Yes	
Maple Colors	HuneX	Kadokawa Games	2005-03-31^{JP}	Yes		
Mar Heaven: Arm Fight Dream	Konami	Konami	2005-11-03^{JP}	Yes		
Marble Chaos	Phoenix Games	Phoenix Games	2007-08-10^{EU}		Yes	
Marc Ecko's Getting Up: Contents Under Pressure	The Collective	Atari	2006-02-14^{NA}	Yes ^{KO}	Yes	Yes
Margot's Word Brain	Slam Games	Zoo Digital Publishing	2008-07-18^{EU}		Yes	
Mark Davis Pro Bass Challenge •SuperLite 2000: Big Bass: Bass Tsuri Kanzen Kouryaku^{JP}	SIMS	Natsume Inc.^{NA}, Success^{JP}	2003-08-27^{NA}	Yes	Yes	Yes
The Mark of Kri	Sony Computer Entertainment	Sony Computer Entertainment^{EU, NA}, Capcom^{JP}	2002-07-29^{NA}	Yes	Yes	Yes
Marl de Jigsaw	Nippon Ichi Software	Nippon Ichi Software	2001-11-15^{JP}	Yes		
Marvel Nemesis: Rise of the Imperfects	Nihilistic Software	Electronic Arts	2005-09-20^{NA}	Yes ^{KO}	Yes	Yes
Marvel Super Hero Squad	Blue Tongue Entertainment	THQ	2009-10-20^{NA}		Yes	Yes
Marvel: Ultimate Alliance	Raven Software	Activision	2006-10-24^{NA}		Yes	Yes
Marvel: Ultimate Alliance 2	n-Space	Activision	2009-09-15^{NA}		Yes	Yes
Marvel vs. Capcom 2 •Marvel vs. Capcom 2: New Age of Heroes^{JP, KO}	Capcom	Capcom	2002-09-19^{JP}	Yes ^{JP, KO}	Yes	Yes
Mary-Kate and Ashley: Sweet 16 – Licensed to Drive	n-Space	Acclaim Entertainment	2002-11-20^{NA}		Yes	Yes
Mashed: Drive To Survive	SuperSonic Software	Empire Interactive	2004-06-18^{EU}		Yes	
Master Chess •Simple 2000 Honkaku Shikou Series Vol. 3: The Chess^{JP}	Yuki	D3 Publisher^{JP}, 505 Game Street^{EU}	2002-07-25^{JP}	Yes	Yes	
Master Rallye	Steel Monkeys	Microids	2002-11-15^{EU}		Yes	
Masters of the Universe: He-Man: Defender of Grayskull	Savage Entertainment	Midas Interactive Entertainment	2005-02-25^{EU}		Yes	
Mat Hoffman's Pro BMX 2 •Mat Hoffman's Pro BMX 2003^{JP}	Rainbow Studios	Activision^{EU, NA}, Capcom^{JP}	2002-08-12^{NA}	Yes	Yes	Yes
Matantei Loki Ragnarok Mayoukaku	Taito	Taito	2005-12-22^{JP}	Yes		
The Matrix: Path of Neo	Shiny Entertainment	Atari	2005-11-07^{NA}	Yes	Yes	Yes
Mawaza	Media Vision	Sony Computer Entertainment	2005-10-06^{JP}	Yes		
Max Payne	Remedy Entertainment	Rockstar Games	2001-12-06^{NA}	Yes	Yes	Yes
Max Payne 2: The Fall of Max Payne	Remedy Entertainment	Rockstar Games	2003-12-02^{NA}		Yes	Yes
Maximo: Ghosts to Glory •Maximo^{EU, JP, KO}	Capcom	Capcom	2001-12-27^{JP}	Yes ^{JP, KO}	Yes	Yes
Maximo vs. Army of Zin •Makai Eiyūki Maximo: Machine Monster no Yabou^{JP}	Capcom	Capcom	2003-09-18^{JP}	Yes ^{JP, KO}	Yes	Yes
MaXXed Out Racing •Simple 2000 Ultimate Series Vol. 3: Saisoku! Zokusha King^{JP}	D3 Publisher	D3 Publisher^{JP}, Midas Interactive Entertainment^{EU}	2002-09-26^{JP}	Yes	Yes	
Maxxed Out Racing: Nitro •Simple 2000 Ultimate Series Vol. 30: Kourin! Zokusha God^{JP}	D3 Publisher	D3 Publisher^{JP}, Essential Games^{PAL}	2006-02-02^{JP}	Yes	Yes	
Maze Action •Simple 2000 Ultimate Series Vol. 8: Gekitou! Meiro King^{JP}	D3 Publisher	D3 Publisher^{JP}, Agetec^{EU}	2003-04-24^{JP}	Yes	Yes	
McFarlane's Evil Prophecy	Konami	Konami	2004-06-15^{NA}		Yes	Yes
MDK2: Armageddon	BioWare	Interplay Entertainment	2001-03-26^{NA}		Yes	Yes
The Mechsmith: Run=Dim	Idea Factory	Idea Factory	2000-08-24^{JP}	Yes		
Medal of Honor: European Assault	EA Los Angeles	Electronic Arts	2005-06-07^{NA}	Yes	Yes	Yes
Medal of Honor: Frontline	EA Los Angeles	Electronic Arts	2002-05-29^{NA}	Yes	Yes	Yes
Medal of Honor: Rising Sun	EA Los Angeles	Electronic Arts	2003-11-11^{NA}	Yes	Yes	Yes
Medal of Honor: Vanguard	EA Los Angeles	Electronic Arts	2007-03-26^{NA}	Yes	Yes	Yes
Medical 91	Takuyo	Takuyo	2005-07-21^{JP}	Yes		
Mega Man Anniversary Collection	Atomic Planet Entertainment	Capcom	2004-06-22^{NA}			Yes
Mega Man X Collection	Capcom	Capcom	2006-01-10^{NA}			Yes
Mega Man X: Command Mission •RockMan X Command Mission^{JP}	Capcom	Capcom	2004-07-29^{JP}	Yes	Yes	Yes
Mega Man X7 •RockMan X7^{JP, KO}	Capcom	Capcom	2003-07-17^{JP}	Yes ^{JP, KO}	Yes	Yes
Mega Man X8 •RockMan X8^{JP, KO}	Capcom	Capcom	2004-12-07^{JP}	Yes ^{JP, KO}	Yes	Yes
MegaRace 3: Nanotech Disaster	Cryo Interactive	Cryo Interactive	2002-03-29^{EU}		Yes	
Meine Liebe II: Hokori to Seigi to Ai	Tenky	Konami	2006-02-09^{JP}	Yes		
Meine Liebe: Yūbinaru Kioku	Konami	Konami	2004-09-22^{JP}	Yes		
Meitantei Conan: Daiei Teikoku no Isan	Bandai	Bandai	2004-11-18^{JP}	Yes		
Meitantei Evangelion	Headlock	Broccoli	2007-01-18^{JP}	Yes		
Melty Blood: Act Cadenza	Ecole Software	Ecole Software	2006-08-10^{JP}	Yes		
Melty Blood: Actress Again	Ecole Software	Ecole Software	2009-08-20^{JP}	Yes		
Memorial Song	Datam Polystar	Datam Polystar	2002-08-22^{JP}	Yes		
Memories Off 5: Encore (Note: stand-alone expansion for Memories Off 5: Togireta Film.)	KID	KID	2007-07-12^{JP}	Yes		
Memories Off 5: Togireta Film	KID	CyberFront	2005-10-27^{JP}	Yes		
Memories Off 6: Next Relation (Note: stand-alone expansion for Memories Off 6: T-wave.)	5pb	5pb	2009-08-27^{JP}	Yes		
Memories Off 6: T-wave	5pb	CyberFront	2008-08-21^{JP}	Yes		
Memories Off After Rain Vol. 1: Oridzuru (Note: stand-alone expansion for Memories Off and Memories Off 2nd.)	KID	KID	2005-01-27^{JP}	Yes		
Memories Off After Rain Vol. 2: Souen (Note: stand-alone expansion for Memories Off and Memories Off 2nd.)	KID	KID	2005-02-24^{JP}	Yes		
Memories Off After Rain Vol. 3: Sotsugyou (Note: stand-alone expansion for Memories Off and Memories Off 2nd.)	KID	KID	2005-03-31^{JP}	Yes		
Memories Off Duet: 1st & 2nd Stories	KID	KID	2003-03-27^{JP}	Yes		
Memories Off Mix (Note: stand-alone expansion for the Memories Off series; includes mini-games.)	KID	KID	2003-09-25^{JP}	Yes		
Memories Off: Sorekara	KID	KID	2004-06-24^{JP}	Yes		
Memories Off: Sorekara Again (Note: stand-alone expansion for Memories Off: Sorekara.)	KID	KID	2006-03-23^{JP}	Yes		
Men at Work! 3	KID	KID	2004-11-25^{JP}	Yes		
Men in Black II: Alien Escape	Infogrames Melbourne House	Infogrames	2002-06-28^{NA}	Yes ^{KO}	Yes	Yes
The Menkou Shutoku Simulation ~Dourokoutsūhou Taiouban~ •Simple 2000 Series Vol. 86: The Menkou Shutoku Simulation ~Dourokoutsūhou Taiouban~^{JP} (Note: update for The Menkyo Shutoku Simulation.)	Vingt-et-un Systems	D3 Publisher	2005-10-06^{JP}	Yes		
The Menkyo Shutoku Simulation •Simple 2000 Series Vol. 25: The Menkyo Shutoku Simulation^{JP}	Vingt-et-un Systems	D3 Publisher	2003-04-03^{JP}	Yes		
Mercenaries 2: World in Flames	Artificial Mind and Movement	Electronic Arts	2008-08-31^{NA}	Yes	Yes	Yes
Mercenaries: Playground of Destruction	Pandemic Studios	LucasArts^{EU, NA}, Electronic Arts^{JP}	2005-01-10^{NA}	Yes	Yes	Yes
Mercury Meltdown Remix	Ignition Entertainment	Ignition Entertainment	2006-11-30^{EU}		Yes	Yes
Mermaid Prism •Simple 2000 Series Vol. 122: The Ningyo Hime Monogatari – Mermaid Prism^{JP}	Vingt-et-un Systems	D3 Publisher	2006-10-26^{JP}	Yes		
Meshimase Roman Sabou •Simple 2000 Series Vol. 98: The Roman Sabou^{JP}	Vingt-et-un Systems	D3 Publisher	2004-10-14^{JP}	Yes		
Metal Arms: Glitch in the System	Mass Media Games	Vivendi Universal Games	2003-11-18^{NA}		Yes	Yes
Metal Gear Solid 2: Sons of Liberty •Metal Gear Solid 2: Substance (different version)	Konami	Konami	2001-11-12^{NA}	Yes ^{JP, KO}	Yes	Yes
Metal Gear Solid 3: Snake Eater •Metal Gear Solid 3: Subsistence (different version)	Konami	Konami	2004-11-17^{NA}	Yes ^{JP, KO}	Yes	Yes
Metal Saga •Metal Saga: Sajin no Kusari^{JP}	Crea-Tech	Success^{JP}, Atlus^{NA}	2005-06-09^{JP}	Yes		Yes
Metal Slug	SNK Playmore	SNK Playmore	2006-06-29^{JP}	Yes		
Metal Slug 3	SNK Playmore	SNK Playmore^{JP}, Ignition Entertainment^{EU}	2003-06-19^{JP}	Yes	Yes	
Metal Slug 4	SNK Playmore	SNK Playmore^{JP}, Ignition Entertainment^{EU}	2004-09-22^{JP}	Yes	Yes	
Metal Slug 5	SNK Playmore	SNK Playmore^{JP}, Ignition Entertainment^{EU}	2005-04-28^{JP}	Yes	Yes	Yes
Metal Slug 6	SNK Playmore	SNK Playmore	2006-09-14^{JP}	Yes ^{JP, KO}		
Metal Slug Anthology •Metal Slug Complete^{JP, KO}	Terminal Reality	SNK Playmore^{JP}, Ignition Entertainment^{EU}	2007-03-28^{NA}	Yes ^{JP, KO}	Yes	Yes
Metal Wolf REV	PrincessSoft	PrincessSoft	2006-02-23^{JP}	Yes		
MetropolisMania •Machi-ing Maker^{JP} •Simple 2000 Series Vol. 39: Boku no Machi Zukuri: Machi-ing Maker++^{JP}	Indi	Media Factory^{JP}, Natsume Inc.^{NA}, Ubisoft^{EU}	2001-09-27^{JP}	Yes	Yes	Yes
MetropolisMania 2 •Machi-ing Maker 2: Zoku Boku no Machi Zukuri^{JP}	Indi	D3 Publisher^{JP}, Natsume Inc.^{NA}, Ubisoft^{EU}	2006-07-13^{JP}	Yes	Yes	Yes
Mezase! Chess Champion •SuperLite 2000 Table: Mezase! Chess Champion^{JP}	Success	Success	2004-12-16^{JP}	Yes		
Mezase! Meimon Yakyūbu 2 •SuperLite 2000 Table: Mezase! Meimon Yakyūbu 2^{JP}	Dazz	Dazz	2001-08-23^{JP}	Yes		
Mezase! Super Bowler •SuperLite 2000 Sports: Mezase! Super Bowler^{JP}	Success	Success	2005-03-10^{JP}	Yes		
Mezase! Super Hustler!! •SuperLite 2000: Mezase! Super Hustler!!^{JP}	Success	Success	2005-02-10^{JP}	Yes		
Miami Vice	Atomic Planet Entertainment	Davilex Games	2004-12-03^{EU}		Yes	
Michigan: Report from Hell •Michigan^{JP}	Grasshopper Manufacture	Spike^{JP}, 505 Game Street^{EU}	2004-08-05^{JP}	Yes	Yes	
Micro Machines	Infogrames Sheffield House	Infogrames^{EU, NA}, Atari^{AU}	2002-11-08^{EU}		Yes	Yes
Micro Machines V4	Supersonic Software	Codemasters	2006-06-27^{NA}		Yes	Yes
Midnight Club 3: DUB Edition • Midnight Club 3: DUB Edition Remix (different version)	Rockstar San Diego	Rockstar Games	2005-04-11^{NA}		Yes	Yes
Midnight Club II	Rockstar San Diego	Rockstar Games	2003-04-09^{NA}		Yes	Yes
Midnight Club Street Racing	Rockstar San Diego	Rockstar Games^{EU, NA}, Syscom^{JP}	2000-10-25^{NA}	Yes	Yes	Yes
Midway Arcade Treasures	Midway Games	Midway Games	2003-11-17^{NA}		Yes	Yes
Midway Arcade Treasures 2	Midway Games	Midway Games	2004-10-11^{NA}		Yes	Yes
Midway Arcade Treasures 3	Midway Games	Midway Games	2005-09-27^{NA}		Yes	Yes
Might and Magic: Day of the Destroyer	3DO	Imagineer	2001-09-06^{JP}	Yes		
Mighty Mulan	The Code Monkeys	Phoenix Games	2006^{EU}		Yes	
Mike Tyson Heavyweight Boxing	Atomic Planet	Codemasters	2002-06-07^{EU}		Yes	Yes
Mikomai: Towa no Omoi	KID	KID	2005-09-08^{JP}	Yes		
Million God	Aruze	Nippon Amuse	2002-12-26^{JP}	Yes		
The Mini Bijo Keikan •Simple 2000 Series Vol. 88: The Mini Bijo Keikan^{JP}	Daft	D3 Publisher	2005-11-10^{JP}	Yes		
Mini Desktop Racing	Data Design Interactive	Metro3D	2005-07-27^{EU}		Yes	
Minority Report: Everybody Runs	Treyarch	Activision	2002-11-19^{NA}		Yes	Yes
Mirai Shounen Conan	D3 Publisher	D3 Publisher	2005-08-25^{JP}	Yes		
Missing Blue	Tonkin House	Tonkin House	2001-07-26^{JP}	Yes		
Missing Parts Side A: The Tantei Stories	FOG Inc.	FOG Inc.	2003-11-27^{JP}	Yes		
Missing Parts Side B: The Tantei Stories	FOG Inc.	FOG Inc.	2004-02-19^{JP}	Yes		
Mission Impossible: Operation Surma	Paradigm Entertainment	Atari	2003-12-05^{EU}	Yes	Yes	Yes
Mister Mosquito	Zoom	Sony Computer Entertainment^{JP}, Eidos Interactive^{EU, NA}	2001-06-21^{JP}	Yes	Yes	Yes
Mitsu x Mitsu Drops: Love x Love Honey Life	Design Factory	Idea Factory	2006-04-06^{JP}	Yes		
Mizu no Senritsu	KID	KID	2005-09-29^{JP}	Yes		
Mizu no Senritsu 2: Hi no Kioku	KID	KID	2006-10-26^{JP}	Yes		
Mizuiro	Interchannel	Interchannel	2002-12-26^{JP}	Yes		
MLB 06: The Show	San Diego Studio	Sony Computer Entertainment	2006-02-28^{NA}	Yes ^{KO}		Yes
MLB 07: The Show	San Diego Studio	Sony Computer Entertainment	2007-02-26^{NA}	Yes ^{KO}		Yes
MLB 08: The Show	San Diego Studio	Sony Computer Entertainment	2008-03-04^{NA}			Yes
MLB 09: The Show	San Diego Studio	Sony Computer Entertainment	2009-03-03^{NA}			Yes
MLB 10: The Show	San Diego Studio	Sony Computer Entertainment	2010-03-02^{NA}	Yes ^{KO}		Yes
MLB 11: The Show	San Diego Studio	Sony Computer Entertainment	2011-03-08^{NA}	Yes ^{KO}		Yes
MLB 2004 •MLB 2003^{JP}	989 Sports	Sony Computer Entertainment	2003-03-10^{NA}	Yes		Yes
MLB 2005 •MLB 2004^{JP}	989 Sports	Sony Computer Entertainment	2004-03-16^{NA}	Yes		Yes
MLB 2006	989 Sports	Sony Computer Entertainment	2005-03-08^{NA}			Yes
MLB Power Pros •Jikkyou Powerful Major League 2^{JP}	Konami	2K Sports^{NA}, Konami^{JP}	2007-10-03^{NA}	Yes		Yes
MLB Power Pros 2008 •Jikkyou Powerful Major League 3^{JP}	Konami	2K Sports^{NA}, Konami^{JP, KO}	2008-07-29^{NA}	Yes ^{JP, KO}		Yes
MLB SlugFest 20-03	Midway Games	Midway Games	2002-06-23^{NA}			Yes
MLB SlugFest 20-04	Midway Games	Midway Games	2003-03-16^{NA}			Yes
MLB SlugFest 2006	Blue Shift	Midway Games	2006-06-05^{NA}			Yes
MLB SlugFest: Loaded	Midway Games	Midway Games	2004-06-23^{NA}			Yes
Mobile Light Force 2 •Shikigami no Shiro^{JP}	Alfa System	Taito^{JP}, XS Games^{EU, NA}	2002-06-26^{NA}	Yes	Yes	Yes
Mobile Suit Gundam: Climax U.C. •Kidou Senshi Gundam: Climax U.C.^{JP}	Bandai	Bandai	2006-03-02^{JP}	Yes		
Mobile Suit Gundam: Encounters in Space •Kidou Senshi Gundam: Meguriai Sora^{JP}	Bandai	Bandai	2003-09-04^{JP}	Yes		Yes
Mobile Suit Gundam: Federation vs. Zeon •Kidou Senshi Gundam: Renpou vs. Zeon DX^{JP}	Bandai	Bandai^{JP, NA}, Infogrames^{EU}	2001-12-06^{JP}	Yes	Yes	Yes
Mobile Suit Gundam: Gundam vs. Zeta Gundam •Kidou Senshi Gundam: Gundam vs. Z Gundam^{JP}	Capcom	Bandai	2004-12-09^{JP}	Yes		Yes
Mobile Suit Gundam: Journey to Jaburo •Kidou Senshi Gundam^{JP}	Bandai	Bandai	2000-12-21^{JP}	Yes		Yes
Mobile Suit Gundam SEED •Kidou Senshi Gundam Seed^{JP}	Natsume Co., Ltd.	Bandai	2003-07-31^{JP}	Yes		
Mobile Suit Gundam SEED: Never Ending Tomorrow •Kido Senshi Gundam Seed: Owaranai Ashita e^{JP}	Bandai	Bandai	2004-10-07^{JP}	Yes		Yes
Mobile Suit Gundam: The One Year War •Kidou Senshi Gundam: Ichinen Sensou^{JP}	Namco	Bandai	2005-04-07^{JP}	Yes		
Mobile Suit Gundam Z: AEUG vs. Titans •Kidou Senshi Z Gundam: AEUG Vs. Titans^{JP}	Capcom	Bandai	2003-12-04^{JP}	Yes		
Mobile Suit Gundam: Zeonic Front •Zeonic Front: Kidou Senshi Gundam 0079^{JP}	Bandai	Bandai	2001-09-06^{JP}	Yes		Yes
Moe Moe 2-Ji Daisenryaku 2	SystemSoft	SystemSoft	2010-02-04^{JP}	Yes		
Moe Moe 2-Ji Daisenryaku Deluxe	SystemSoft	SystemSoft	2008-11-27^{JP}	Yes		
Moekan: Moekko Company	PrincessSoft	PrincessSoft	2004-02-05^{JP}	Yes		
Mojib-Ribbon	NanaOn-Sha	Sony Computer Entertainment	2003-11-20^{JP}	Yes		
Mojo!	FarSight Studios	Crave Entertainment	2003-08-26^{NA}		Yes	Yes
Momotarou Dentetsu 11	Hudson Soft	Hudson Soft	2002-12-05^{JP}	Yes		
Momotarou Dentetsu 12	Hudson Soft	Hudson Soft	2003-12-11^{JP}	Yes		
Momotarou Dentetsu 15	Hudson Soft	Hudson Soft	2005-12-08^{JP}	Yes		
Momotarou Dentetsu 16	Hudson Soft	Hudson Soft	2006-12-07^{JP}	Yes		
Momotarou Dentetsu USA	Hudson Soft	Hudson Soft	2004-11-18^{JP}	Yes		
Momotarou Dentetsu X: Kyūshū-hen mo Arubai	Hudson Soft	Hudson Soft	2001-12-13^{JP}	Yes		
Monkey Turn V	Bandai	Bandai	2004-07-01^{JP}	Yes		
Monochrome	KID	KID	2004-08-26^{JP}	Yes		
Monochrome Factor: Cross Road	Genterprise	5pb	2008-11-27^{JP}	Yes		
Monopoly	Electronic Arts	Electronic Arts	2008-10-20^{NA}		Yes	Yes
Monopoly Party!	Runecraft	Infogrames^{EU, NA}, Tomy^{JP}	2002-11-11^{NA}	Yes	Yes	Yes
Monster 4x4: Masters of Metal	Ubisoft	Ubisoft	2003-11-25^{NA}			Yes
Monster Attack •Simple 2000 Series Vol. 31: The Chikyū Boueigun^{JP}	Sandlot	D3 Publisher^{JP}, Agetec^{EU}	2003-06-26^{JP}	Yes	Yes	
Monster Bass	Konami	Konami	2003-02-06^{JP}	Yes		
Monster Eggs	Phoenix Games	Phoenix Games	2007-04-20^{EU}		Yes	
Monster House	Artificial Mind and Movement	THQ	2006-07-18^{NA}	Yes ^{KO}	Yes	Yes
Monster Hunter	Capcom	Capcom	2004-03-11^{JP}	Yes	Yes	Yes
Monster Hunter 2	Capcom	Capcom	2006-02-16^{JP}	Yes		
Monster Hunter G (Note: update for Monster Hunter.)	Capcom	Capcom	2005-01-20^{JP}	Yes ^{JP, KO}		
Monster Jam	Torus Games	Activision	2007-11-13^{NA}		Yes	Yes
Monster Jam: Maximum Destruction	Ubisoft	Ubisoft	2002-06-13^{NA}		Yes	Yes
Monster Jam: Urban Assault	Torus Games	Activision	2008-10-28^{NA}		Yes	Yes
Monster Lab	Backbone Entertainment	Eidos Interactive	2008-11-04^{NA}		Yes	Yes
Monster Rancher 3 •Monster Farm^{JP}	Tecmo	Tecmo	2001-03-22^{JP}	Yes		Yes
Monster Rancher 4 •Monster Farm 4^{JP}	Tecmo	Tecmo	2003-08-14^{JP}	Yes		Yes
Monster Rancher EVO •Monster Farm 5: Circus Caravan^{JP}	Tecmo	Tecmo	2005-12-08^{JP}	Yes		Yes
Monster Trux Extreme: Arena Edition	Data Design Interactive	Metro3D	2005-03-25^{PAL}		Yes	
Monster Trux Extreme: Offroad Edition	Data Design Interactive	Bold Games	2005-03-25^{PAL}		Yes	
Monsters, Inc.	Artificial Mind and Movement	Sony Computer Entertainment	2002-03-19^{NA}		Yes	Yes
Monsters, Inc. Scare Island	Artificial Mind and Movement	Sony Computer Entertainment	2002-02-01^{EU}		Yes	
Monsters vs. Aliens	Beenox	Activision	2009-03-24^{NA}		Yes	Yes
Moorhuhn Fun Kart 2008	Sproing Interactive	cdv Software	2008-03-26^{EU}		Yes	
Morita Shogi	Yuki	Yuki	2000-03-04^{JP}	Yes		
Mortal Kombat: Armageddon	Midway Games	Midway Games	2006-10-09^{NA}		Yes	Yes
Mortal Kombat: Deadly Alliance	Midway Games	Midway Games	2002-11-16^{NA}		Yes	Yes
Mortal Kombat: Deception	Midway Games	Midway Games	2004-10-04^{NA}		Yes	Yes
Mortal Kombat: Shaolin Monks	Midway Games	Midway Games	2005-09-16^{NA}		Yes	Yes
Moto X Maniac	Phoenix Games	Phoenix Games	2007-03-09^{EU}		Yes	
Motocross Mania 3	Deibus Studios	2K Games	2005-04-22^{EU}		Yes	Yes
MotoGP	Namco	Namco	2000-10-12^{NA}	Yes	Yes	Yes
MotoGP 07	Milestone	Capcom	2007-10-01^{EU}	Yes	Yes	Yes
MotoGP 08	Milestone	Capcom	2008-10-24^{PAL}		Yes	Yes
MotoGP 2	Namco	Namco	2001-12-20^{JP}	Yes	Yes	Yes
MotoGP 3	Namco	Namco	2003-02-27^{JP}	Yes	Yes	Yes
MotoGP 4	Namco	Sony Computer Entertainment^{EU}, Namco^{JP, NA}	2005-05-27^{EU}	Yes	Yes	Yes
Motor Mayhem: Vehicular Combat League	Beyond Games	Infogrames	2001-06-20^{NA}		Yes	Yes
Motorbike King •Simple 2000 Ultimate Series Vol. 13: Kyousou! Tansha King^{JP}	Tamsoft	D3 Publisher^{JP}, 505 Game Street^{EU}	2003-10-23^{JP}	Yes	Yes	
Motorsiege: Warriors of Primetime	Lightspeed Games	Play It!	2003-08-29^{EU}		Yes	
MotorStorm: Arctic Edge	Virtuos	Sony Computer Entertainment	2009-10-03^{AU}		Yes	Yes
Motto Golful Golf	Artdink	Artdink	2002-03-07^{JP}	Yes		
Moujūtsukai to Oujisama	Design Factory	Idea Factory	2010-06-24^{JP}	Yes		
Moujūtsukai to Oujisama: Snow Bride (Note: stand-alone expansion for Moujūtsukai to Oujisama.)	Design Factory	Idea Factory	2011-02-24^{JP}	Yes		
Mountain Bike Adrenaline •Mountain Bike Adrenaline featuring Salomon^{EU}	Fresh3D	Valcon Games	2007-10-09^{NA}		Yes	Yes
The Mouse Police	Phoenix Games	Phoenix Games	2004-03-18^{EU}		Yes	
Mouse Trophy	Neko Entertainment	Bigben Interactive	2004-12-03^{EU}		Yes	
Mr. Bean	Beyond Reality	Blast! Entertainment Ltd	2007-11-29^{EU}		Yes	
Mr. Golf •Golful Golf^{JP}	Artdink	Artdink, Midas Interactive Entertainment	2001-05-17^{JP}	Yes	Yes	
MS Saga: A New Dawn •Gundam True Odyssey: Ushinawareta G no Densetsu^{JP}	Bandai	Bandai	2005-06-30^{JP}	Yes		Yes
MTV's Celebrity Deathmatch	Big Ape Productions	Gotham Games	2003-10-14^{NA}		Yes	Yes
MTX Mototrax	Left Field Productions	Activision	2004-03-02^{NA}		Yes	Yes
The Mummy Returns	Blitz Games	Vivendi Universal Games	2001-10-03^{NA}		Yes	Yes
The Mummy: The Animated Series	Asobo Studio	Hip Games	2004-10-01^{EU}		Yes	
The Mummy: Tomb of the Dragon Emperor	Eurocom	Sierra Entertainment	2008-07-22^{NA}		Yes	Yes
Mundial 2002 Challenge	Anco Software	EcoFilmes (now known as EcoPlay)	2001 or 2002 ^{EU}		Yes	
Muppets Party Cruise	Mass Media Games	TDK Mediactive	2003-11-13^{NA}		Yes	Yes
Murasaki no Honoo	Idea Factory	Idea Factory	2008-11-27^{JP}	Yes		
Musashi: Samurai Legend •Musashiden II: Blade Master^{JP}	Square Enix	Square Enix^{JP, NA}, Atari^{EU}	2005-03-15^{JP}	Yes	Yes	Yes
Mushihimesama	Cave	Taito	2005-07-21^{JP}	Yes		
The Musume Ikusei Simulation •Simple 2000 Series Vol. 36: The Musume Ikusei Simulation – Otousan to Issho^{JP}	Yuki	D3 Publisher	2003-10-09^{JP}	Yes		
Mutsuzaki Hoshi Kikari	Chise	Chise	2006-07-27^{JP}	Yes		
MVP 06: NCAA Baseball	EA Canada	Electronic Arts	2006-01-18^{NA}			Yes
MVP 07: NCAA Baseball	EA Canada	Electronic Arts	2007-02-06^{NA}			Yes
MVP Baseball 2003	EA Canada	Electronic Arts	2003-03-10^{NA}	Yes		Yes
MVP Baseball 2004	EA Canada	Electronic Arts	2004-03-09^{NA}	Yes ^{KO}		Yes
MVP Baseball 2005	EA Canada	Electronic Arts	2005-02-22^{NA}	Yes		Yes
MX 2002 Featuring Ricky Carmichael	Pacific Coast Power and Light	THQ	2001-07-03^{NA}		Yes	Yes
MX Rider	Paradigm Entertainment	Infogrames	2001-10-26^{EU}		Yes	Yes
MX Superfly	Pacific Coast Power and Light	THQ	2002-06-17^{NA}		Yes	Yes
MX Unleashed	Rainbow Studios	THQ	2004-02-17^{NA}		Yes	Yes
MX vs. ATV Unleashed	Rainbow Studios	THQ	2005-03-16^{NA}	Yes ^{KO}	Yes	Yes
MX vs. ATV: Untamed	Incinerator Games	THQ	2007-12-17^{NA}		Yes	Yes
MX World Tour: Featuring Jamie Little	Impulse Games	Crave Entertainment^{NA}, Play It!^{EU}	2005-04-06^{NA}		Yes	Yes
My Home o Tsukurou!	Victor Interactive Software	Victor Interactive Software	2002-06-06^{JP}	Yes		
My Home o Tsukurou 2! Jūjitsu! Kantan Sekkei!! (Note: update for My Home o Tsukurou 2! Shou.)	Marvelous Entertainment	Marvelous Entertainment	2006-02-23^{JP}	Yes		
My Home o Tsukurou 2! Shou	Marvelous Entertainment	Marvelous Entertainment	2005-02-24^{JP}	Yes		
My Horse & Me 2	Tate Interactive	Atari	2008-11-21^{EU}		Yes	
My Merry May	KID	KID	2003-01-30^{JP}	Yes		
My Merry Maybe	KID	KID	2003-04-24^{JP}	Yes		
My Street	Idol Minds	Sony Computer Entertainment	2003-03-09^{NA}		Yes	Yes
Myself ; Yourself	Yeti	Yeti	2007-12-20^{JP}	Yes		
Myself; Yourself: Sorezore no Finale (Note: stand-alone expansion for Myself ; Yourself.)	Yeti	Yeti	2009-05-28^{JP}	Yes		
Myst III: Exile	Presto Studios	Ubisoft^{EU, NA}, Electronic Arts^{JP}	2002-09-22^{NA}	Yes	Yes	Yes
Mystereet	Abel Software	Yeti	2006-05-25^{JP}	Yes		
Mystic Heroes •Chou Battle Houshin^{JP}	Koei	Koei	2002-11-16^{JP}	Yes	Yes	Yes
Mystic Nights	N-Log Corporation	Sony Computer Entertainment	2005-09-29^{KO}	Yes ^{KO}		
Myth Makers: Orbs of Doom	Data Design Interactive	Data Design Interactive	2008-03-14^{EU}		Yes	
Myth Makers: Super Kart GP	Data Design Interactive	Data Design Interactive	2007-11-16^{EU}		Yes	
Myth Makers: Trixie in Toyland	Data Design Interactive	Metro3D	2006-06-23^{EU}		Yes	
NadePro!! Kisama mo Seiyū Yattemiro!	GungHo Online Entertainment	GungHo Online Entertainment	2009-10-29^{JP}	Yes		
The Naked Brothers Band	Barking Lizards Technologies	THQ	2008-10-20^{NA}		Yes ^{AU}	Yes
Namco Museum	Mass Media Games	Namco	2001-12-04^{NA}			Yes
Namco Museum 50th Anniversary •Namco Museum Arcade Hits!^{JP}	Digital Eclipse	Namco^{JP, NA}, Electronic Arts^{EU}	2005-08-30^{NA}	Yes	Yes	Yes
Namco X Capcom	Monolith Soft	Namco	2005-05-26^{JP}	Yes		
namCollection	Namco	Namco	2005-07-21^{JP}	Yes		
Nana	Konami	Konami	2005-03-17^{JP}	Yes		
Nanatsuiro * Drops Pure!!	MediaWorks	MediaWorks	2007-09-20^{JP}	Yes		
Nankuro •SuperLite 2000 Puzzle: Nankuro^{JP}	Success	Success	2003-10-09^{JP}	Yes		
Nano Breaker	Konami	Konami	2005-01-27^{JP}	Yes	Yes	Yes
Naraku no Shiro	Fog Inc.	Nippon Ichi Software	2008-03-06^{JP}	Yes		
Narc	VIS Entertainment	Midway Games	2005-03-22^{NA}			Yes
Naruto Shippuden: Ultimate Ninja 4 •Naruto Shippūden: Narutimate Accel^{JP} •Ultimate Ninja 4: Naruto Shippuden^{PAL}	CyberConnect2	Namco Bandai Games^{JP, NA}, Atari^{PAL}	2007-04-05^{JP}	Yes	Yes	Yes
Naruto Shippuden: Ultimate Ninja 5 •Naruto Shippūden: Narutimate Accel 2^{JP}	Cyberconnect2	Namco Bandai Games	2007-12-20^{JP}	Yes	Yes	
Naruto: Ultimate Ninja •Naruto: Narutimate Hero^{JP, KO}	Cyberconnect2	Namco Bandai Games^{JP, NA}, Atari^{PAL}	2003-10-23^{JP}	Yes ^{JP, KO}	Yes	Yes
Naruto: Ultimate Ninja 2 •Naruto: Narutimate Hero 2^{JP}	Cyberconnect2	Namco Bandai Games^{EU, JP, NA}, Atari^{AU}	2004-09-30^{JP}	Yes	Yes	Yes
Naruto: Ultimate Ninja 3 •Naruto: Narutimate Hero 3^{JP}	Cyberconnect2	Namco Bandai Games^{JP, NA}, Atari^{PAL}	2005-12-22^{JP}	Yes	Yes	Yes
Naruto: Uzumaki Chronicles •Naruto: Uzumaki Ninden^{JP}	Racjin	Namco Bandai Games^{JP, NA}, Atari^{PAL}	2005-08-18^{JP}	Yes	Yes	Yes
Naruto: Uzumaki Chronicles 2 •Naruto: Konoha Spirits^{JP, KO}	Racjin	Namco Bandai Games^{JP, KO, NA}, Atari^{PAL}	2006-11-16^{JP}	Yes ^{JP, KO}	Yes	Yes
NASCAR 06: Total Team Control	EA Tiburon	Electronic Arts	2005-08-30^{NA}		Yes	Yes
NASCAR 07	EA Tiburon	Electronic Arts	2006-09-06^{NA}		Yes	Yes
NASCAR 08	EA Tiburon	EA Sports	2007-07-23^{NA}		Yes	Yes
NASCAR 09	EA Tiburon	EA Sports	2008-06-10^{NA}		Yes	Yes
NASCAR 2001	EA Sports	EA Sports	2000-11-06^{NA}			Yes
NASCAR 2005: Chase for the Cup	EA Tiburon	Electronic Arts	2004-08-31^{NA}			Yes
NASCAR: Dirt to Daytona	Monster Games	Infogrames	2002-11-11^{NA}			Yes
NASCAR Heat 2002	Monster Games	Infogrames	2001-06-18^{NA}			Yes
NASCAR Thunder 2002	EA Tiburon	Electronic Arts	2001-10-15^{NA}			Yes
NASCAR Thunder 2003	EA Sports	Electronic Arts	2002-09-29^{NA}			Yes
NASCAR Thunder 2004	EA Tiburon	Electronic Arts	2003-09-16^{NA}			Yes
National Geographic: Safari Adventures Africa •Safari Adventures Africa^{AU}	Blast! Entertainment Ltd	Blast! Entertainment Ltd	2007-10-05^{EU}		Yes	
Natsu Shoujo: Promised Summer	Success	Success	2004-07-29^{JP}	Yes		
Natsu Yume Ya Wa	KID	KID	2003-08-28^{JP}	Yes		
Natsuiro: Hoshikuzu no Memory	PrincessSoft	PrincessSoft	2004-12-22^{JP}	Yes		
Natsuiro Komachi	PrincessSoft	PrincessSoft	2003-09-25^{JP}	Yes		
Natsuiro no Sunadokei	PrincessSoft	PrincessSoft	2002-05-30^{JP}	Yes		
Natsuzora no Monologue	Design Factory	Idea Factory	2010-07-29^{JP}	Yes		
Natural 2: Duo - Sakurairo no Kisetsu	F&C	Kadokawa Games	2005-02-24^{JP}	Yes		
Naval Ops: Commander •Kurogane no Houkou 2: Warship Commander^{JP}	Microcabin	Koei	2004-01-22^{JP}	Yes	Yes	Yes
Naval Ops: Warship Gunner •Kurogane no Houkou 2: Warship Gunner^{JP}	Microcabin	Koei	2003-03-04^{JP}	Yes	Yes	Yes
Naxat Soft Reachmania Vol. 1: CR Galaxy Angel	Naxat Soft	Naxat Soft	2008-11-27^{JP}	Yes		
NBA 06	San Diego Studio	Sony Computer Entertainment	2005-11-01^{NA}			Yes
NBA 07	A.C.R.O.N.Y.M. Games	Sony Computer Entertainment	2006-09-25^{NA}			Yes
NBA 08	A.C.R.O.N.Y.M. Games	Sony Computer Entertainment	2007-09-26^{NA}		Yes ^{AU}	Yes
NBA 09: The Inside	A.C.R.O.N.Y.M. Games	Sony Computer Entertainment	2008-10-07^{NA}			Yes
NBA 2K10	Visual Concepts	2K Sports	2009-10-06^{NA}		Yes	Yes
NBA 2K11	Visual Concepts	2K Sports	2010-10-05^{NA}		Yes	Yes
NBA 2K12	Visual Concepts	2K Sports	2011-10-04^{NA}		Yes	Yes
NBA 2K2 •Sega Sports NBA 2K2^{JP}	Visual Concepts	Sega	2002-01-12^{NA}	Yes		Yes
NBA 2K3	Visual Concepts	Sega	2002-10-08^{NA}	Yes	Yes	Yes
NBA 2K6	Visual Concepts	2K Sports	2005-09-26^{NA}		Yes	Yes
NBA 2K7	Visual Concepts	2K Sports	2006-09-25^{NA}		Yes	Yes
NBA 2K8	Visual Concepts	2K Sports	2007-10-02^{NA}		Yes	Yes
NBA 2K9	Visual Concepts	2K Sports^{NA, PAL}, Spike^{JP}	2008-10-07^{NA}	Yes	Yes	Yes
NBA Ballers	Midway Games	Midway Games	2004-04-05^{NA}		Yes	Yes
NBA Ballers: Phenom	Midway Games	Midway Games	2006-04-05^{NA}			Yes
NBA Hoopz	Eurocom	Midway Games	2001-02-26^{NA}		Yes	Yes
NBA Jam	Acclaim Entertainment	Acclaim Entertainment	2003-09-23^{NA}		Yes	Yes
NBA Live 06	EA Canada	EA Sports	2005-09-26^{NA}	Yes	Yes	Yes
NBA Live 07	EA Canada	EA Sports	2006-09-25^{NA}	Yes	Yes	Yes
NBA Live 08	HB Studios	EA Sports	2007-10-01^{NA}	Yes	Yes	Yes
NBA Live 09	HB Studios	EA Sports	2008-10-07^{NA}	Yes	Yes	Yes
NBA Live 2001	EA Canada	EA Sports	2001-01-22^{NA}	Yes	Yes	Yes
NBA Live 2002	EA Canada	EA Sports	2001-10-29^{NA}	Yes	Yes	Yes
NBA Live 2003	EA Canada	EA Sports	2002-10-08^{NA}	Yes	Yes	Yes
NBA Live 2004	EA Canada	EA Sports	2003-10-14^{NA}	Yes	Yes	Yes
NBA Live 2005	EA Canada	EA Sports	2004-09-28^{NA}	Yes	Yes	Yes
NBA Shootout 2001	989 Sports	Sony Computer Entertainment	2001-02-19^{NA}			Yes
NBA Shootout 2003	989 Sports	Sony Computer Entertainment	2002-09-25^{NA}			Yes
NBA Shootout 2004	989 Sports	Sony Computer Entertainment	2003-10-29^{NA}			Yes
NBA Starting Five	Konami	Konami	2002-10-27^{NA}	Yes		Yes
NBA Starting Five 2005	Konami	Konami	2004-11-11^{JP}	Yes		
NBA Street	NuFX	EA Sports BIG	2001-06-18^{NA}	Yes	Yes	Yes
NBA Street V3	EA Canada	EA Sports BIG	2005-02-08^{NA}	Yes	Yes	Yes
NBA Street Vol. 2	EA Canada	EA Sports BIG	2003-04-28^{NA}	Yes	Yes	Yes
NCAA Basketball 09	EA Canada	Electronic Arts	2008-11-17^{NA}			Yes
NCAA College Basketball 2K3	Kush Games	Sega	2002-12-02^{NA}			Yes
NCAA College Football 2K3	Avalanche Software	Sega	2002-08-07^{NA}			Yes
NCAA Final Four 2001	989 Sports	Sony Computer Entertainment	2000-12-18^{NA}			Yes
NCAA Final Four 2002	989 Sports	Sony Computer Entertainment	2001-11-12^{NA}			Yes
NCAA Final Four 2003	989 Sports	Sony Computer Entertainment	2002-11-27^{NA}			Yes
NCAA Final Four 2004	989 Sports	Sony Computer Entertainment	2003-11-11^{NA}			Yes
NCAA Football 06	EA Tiburon	Electronic Arts	2005-07-11^{NA}			Yes
NCAA Football 07	EA Tiburon	Electronic Arts	2006-07-18^{NA}			Yes
NCAA Football 08	EA Tiburon	Electronic Arts	2007-07-17^{NA}			Yes
NCAA Football 09	EA Tiburon	Electronic Arts	2008-07-15^{NA}			Yes
NCAA Football 10	EA Tiburon	Electronic Arts	2009-07-14^{NA}			Yes
NCAA Football 11	EA Tiburon	Electronic Arts	2010-07-13^{NA}			Yes
NCAA Football 2002	EA Tiburon	EA Sports	2001-07-23^{NA}			Yes
NCAA Football 2003	EA Tiburon	EA Sports	2002-07-20^{NA}			Yes
NCAA Football 2004	EA Tiburon	EA Sports	2003-07-16^{NA}			Yes
NCAA Football 2005	EA Tiburon	Electronic Arts	2004-07-15^{NA}			Yes
NCAA Gamebreaker 2001	989 Sports	Sony Computer Entertainment	2000-12-18^{NA}			Yes
NCAA Gamebreaker 2003	989 Sports	Sony Computer Entertainment	2002-08-14^{NA}			Yes
NCAA Gamebreaker 2004	989 Sports	Sony Computer Entertainment	2003-08-27^{NA}			Yes
NCAA March Madness 06	EA Canada	EA Sports	2005-10-11^{NA}			Yes
NCAA March Madness 07	EA Canada	EA Sports	2007-01-17^{NA}			Yes
NCAA March Madness 08	EA Canada	EA Sports	2007-12-11^{NA}			Yes
NCAA March Madness 2002	NuFX	EA Sports	2002-01-07^{NA}			Yes
NCAA March Madness 2003	NuFX	EA Sports	2002-11-21^{NA}			Yes
NCAA March Madness 2004	NuFX	EA Sports	2003-11-17^{NA}			Yes
NCAA March Madness 2005	EA Canada	EA Sports	2004-11-17^{NA}			Yes
Need for Speed: Carbon •Need for Speed: Carbon Collector's Edition (different version)	EA Canada	Electronic Arts	2006-10-31^{NA}	Yes ^{JP, KO}	Yes	Yes
Need For Speed: Hot Pursuit 2	EA Black Box	EA Games	2002-10-02^{NA}	Yes ^{AS, KO}	Yes	Yes
Need for Speed: Most Wanted •Need for Speed: Most Wanted Black Edition (different version)	EA Canada	Electronic Arts	2005-11-15^{NA}	Yes ^{JP, KO}	Yes	Yes
Need for Speed: ProStreet	EA Black Box	Electronic Arts	2007-11-13^{NA}	Yes	Yes	Yes
Need for Speed: Undercover	Exient Entertainment	Electronic Arts	2008-11-17^{NA}	Yes	Yes	Yes
Need for Speed: Underground •Need for Speed: Underground J^{JP} (different version)	EA Black Box	Electronic Arts	2003-11-17^{NA}	Yes	Yes	Yes
Need for Speed: Underground 2 •Need for Speed: Underground 2: Sha_Do^{JP} (different version)	EA Black Box	Electronic Arts	2004-11-15^{NA}	Yes	Yes	Yes
Negima!? 3-Jikanme ~Koi to Mahou to Sekaiju Densetsu~	Konami	Konami	2006-11-16^{JP}	Yes		
Negima!? Dream Tactic Yumemiru Otome Princess	Konami	Konami	2007-04-26^{JP}	Yes		
The Neko-Mura no Ninnin Pagu Daikan no Akugyou Sanmai •Simple 2000 Series Vol. 116: The Neko-Mura no Ninnin – Pagu Daikan no Akugyou Sanmai^{JP}	Vingt-et-un Systems	D3 Publisher	2007-04-12^{JP}	Yes		
Neo Angelique	Koei	Koei	2006-03-04^{JP}	Yes		
Neo Angelique Full Voice (Note: update for Neo Angelique.)	Koei	Koei	2008-03-27^{JP}	Yes		
Neo Atlas III	Artdink	Artdink	2000-12-14^{JP}	Yes		
Neo Contra	Konami	Konami	2004-10-19^{NA}	Yes ^{JP, KO}	Yes	Yes
Neo Geo Battle Coliseum	SNK Playmore	SNK Playmore^{AU, JP, NA}, Ignition Entertainment^{EU}	2005-12-22^{JP}	Yes	Yes	Yes
Neopets: The Darkest Faerie	Idol Minds	Sony Computer Entertainment	2005-11-16^{NA}			Yes
Neppachi Gold: CR Monster Mansion	Daikoku Denki	Daikoku Denki	2002-08-22^{JP}	Yes		
Net de Bomberman	Hudson Soft	Hudson Soft	2004-02-19^{JP}	Yes		
Netsu Chu! Pro Yakyū 2002	Namco	Namco	2002-04-18^{JP}	Yes		
Netsu Chu! Pro Yakyū 2003	Namco	Namco	2003-04-03^{JP}	Yes		
Netsu Chu! Pro Yakyū 2003: Aki no Night Matsuri (Note: update for Netsu Chu! Pro Yakyū 2003.)	Namco	Namco	2003-10-23^{JP}	Yes		
Netsu Chu! Pro Yakyū 2004	Namco	Namco	2004-03-25^{JP}	Yes		
Nettai Teikiatsu Shoujo	NIne'sFox	NIne'sFox	2007-10-25^{JP}	Yes		
Never7: The End of Infinity	KID	KID	2003-06-26^{JP}	Yes		
Neverland Kenkyūfu	Neverland	Idea Factory	2006-10-12^{JP}	Yes		
New Jinsei Game	Atlus	Takara	2004-12-02^{JP}	Yes		
New Roommania: Porori Seishun	Sega	Sega	2003-03-20^{JP}	Yes		
New York Race	Kalisto Entertainment	Wanadoo Edition	2001-11-23^{EU}		Yes	
Next Generation Tennis •Roland Garros French Open 2002^{FR}	Wanadoo Edition	Wanadoo Edition	2002-05-28^{FR}		Yes	
Next Generation Tennis 2003 •Roland Garros 2003 French Open^{FR}	Wanadoo Edition	Wanadoo Edition	2003-05-21^{FR}		Yes	
NFL 2K2 •Sega Sports NFL 2K2^{JP}	Visual Concepts	Sega	2001-11-19^{NA}	Yes		Yes
NFL 2K3	Visual Concepts	Sega	2002-08-12^{NA}	Yes	Yes	Yes
NFL Blitz 20-02	Midway Games	Midway Games	2002-02-06^{NA}			Yes
NFL Blitz 20-03	Midway Games	Midway Games	2002-08-12^{NA}			Yes
NFL Blitz Pro	Midway Games	Midway Games	2003-10-28^{NA}			Yes
NFL GameDay 2001	989 Studios	Sony Computer Entertainment	2000-11-13^{NA}			Yes
NFL GameDay 2002	989 Studios	Sony Computer Entertainment	2001-12-03^{NA}			Yes
NFL GameDay 2003	989 Studios	Sony Computer Entertainment	2002-08-12^{NA}			Yes
NFL GameDay 2004	989 Studios	Sony Computer Entertainment	2003-08-27^{NA}			Yes
NFL Head Coach	EA Tiburon	EA Sports	2006-06-20^{NA}			Yes
NFL QB Club 2002	Acclaim Studios Austin	Acclaim Entertainment	2001-09-05^{NA}		Yes	Yes
NFL Street	EA Tiburon	EA Sports	2004-01-13^{NA}		Yes	Yes
NFL Street 2	EA Tiburon	EA Sports	2004-12-22^{NA}		Yes	Yes
NFL Street 3	EA Tiburon	EA Sports	2006-11-14^{NA}		Yes	Yes
NHL 06	EA Canada	EA Sports	2005-09-06^{NA}	Yes	Yes	Yes
NHL 07	EA Montreal	EA Sports	2006-09-12^{NA}		Yes	Yes
NHL 08	HB Studios	EA Sports	2007-09-11^{NA}		Yes	Yes
NHL 09	HB Studios	EA Sports	2008-11-04^{NA}		Yes	Yes
NHL 2001	EA Canada	EA Sports	2000-10-25^{NA}		Yes	Yes
NHL 2002	EA Canada	EA Sports	2001-09-24^{NA}	Yes	Yes	Yes
NHL 2003	EA Canada	EA Sports	2002-09-30^{NA}	Yes ^{KO}	Yes	Yes
NHL 2004	EA Canada	EA Sports	2003-09-22^{NA}		Yes	Yes
NHL 2005	EA Canada	EA Sports	2004-09-20^{NA}		Yes	Yes
NHL 2K10	Take-Two Interactive	2K Sports	2009-09-15^{NA}			Yes
NHL 2K3	Treyarch	Sega	2002-11-10^{NA}		Yes	Yes
NHL 2K6	Kush Games	2K Sports	2005-09-07^{NA}		Yes	Yes
NHL 2K7	Kush Games	2K Sports	2006-10-02^{NA}		Yes	Yes
NHL 2K8	Kush Games	2K Sports	2007-09-10^{NA}		Yes	Yes
NHL 2K9	Take-Two Interactive	2K Sports^{EU, NA}, Spike^{JP}	2008-09-08^{NA}	Yes	Yes	Yes
NHL FaceOff 2001	989 Sports	Sony Computer Entertainment	2001-02-05^{NA}			Yes
NHL FaceOff 2003	989 Sports	Sony Computer Entertainment	2002-11-05^{NA}			Yes
NHL Hitz 20-02	Black Box Games	Midway Games	2001-09-24^{NA}		Yes	Yes
NHL Hitz 20-03	Black Box Games	Midway Games	2002-09-16^{NA}		Yes	Yes
NHL Hitz Pro	Next Level Games	Midway Games	2003-09-25^{NA}		Yes	Yes
NHRA Championship Drag Racing	Lucky Chicken	ValuSoft	2005-09-14^{NA}			Yes
NHRA Drag Racing: Countdown to the Championship 2007	Pipeworks Studios	THQ	2007-07-24^{NA}			Yes
Ni Hao, Kai-Lan: Super Game Day	Take-Two Interactive	Take-Two Interactive	2009-10-26^{NA}			Yes
Nichibeikan Pro Yakyū: Final League	SquareSoft	SquareSoft	2002-04-25^{JP}	Yes		
Nicktoons: Attack of the Toybots	Blue Tongue Entertainment	THQ	2007-10-23^{NA}		Yes	Yes
Nicktoons: Battle for Volcano Island •SpongeBob and Friends: Battle for Volcano Island^{PAL}	Blue Tongue Entertainment	THQ	2006-10-24^{NA}		Yes	Yes
Nicktoons Movin' •SpongeBob SquarePants Movin' with Friends^{EU}	Mass Media Games	THQ	2004-10-21^{NA}	Yes ^{KO}	Yes	Yes
Nicktoons Unite! •SpongeBob SquarePants & Friends: Unite!^{EU}	Blue Tongue Entertainment	THQ	2005-10-26^{NA}		Yes	Yes
Night Wizard the Video Game: Denial of the World	5pb	5pb	2008-02-28^{JP}	Yes		
The Nightmare of Druaga: Fushigino Dungeon •The Nightmare of Druaga: Fushigi no Dungeon^{JP}	Arika	Arika^{JP}, Namco^{NA}	2004-07-29^{JP}	Yes		Yes
Nights into Dreams	Sonic Team	Sega	2008-02-21^{JP}	Yes		
Nightshade •Kunoichi^{AS, JP, KO}	Wow Entertainment	Sega	2003-12-02^{AS}	Yes ^{AS, JP, KO}	Yes	Yes
Nihon Sumo Kyokai Kounin: Nihon Oozumou Gekitou Honbashohen	Konami	Konami	2002-07-11^{JP}	Yes		
Ninja Assault	Namco	Namco	2002-09-12^{JP}	Yes	Yes	Yes
Ninjabread Man	Data Design Interactive	Metro3D	2005-10-14^{EU}		Yes	
Ninkyouden: Toseinin Ichidaiki	Genki	Genki	2006-03-02^{JP}	Yes		
Nippon Oozumou Kakutouhen	Konami	Konami	2001-11-15^{JP}	Yes		
Nishikaze no Kyoushikyouku: The Rhapsody of Zephyr	SoftMax	Marvelous Entertainment	2004-01-29^{JP}	Yes		
Nitrobike	Left Field Productions	Ubisoft	2008-10-14^{NA}		Yes	Yes
Noble Racing	Midas Interactive Entertainment	Midas Interactive Entertainment	2006-03-10^{EU}		Yes	
Nobunaga no Yabou Online	Koei	Koei	2003-06-12^{JP}	Yes		
Nobunaga no Yabou Online: Haten no Shou (Note: update for Nobunaga no Yabou Online (boxed edition).)	Koei	Koei	2006-12-13^{JP}	Yes		
Nobunaga no Yabou Online: Souha no Shou (Note: update for Nobunaga no Yabou Online (boxed edition).)	Koei	Koei	2008-03-26^{JP}	Yes		
Nobunaga no Yabou Online: Tappi no Shou (Note: update for Nobunaga no Yabou Online (boxed edition).)	Koei	Koei	2004-12-15^{JP}	Yes		
Nobunaga no Yabou: Ranseiki •Nobunaga no Yabou: Ranseiki with Power-Up Kit (different version)	Koei	Koei	2002-04-04^{JP}	Yes		
Nobunaga no Yabou: Soutenroku •Nobunaga no Yabou: Soutenroku with Power-Up Kit (different version)	Koei	Koei	2003-01-30^{JP}	Yes		
Nobunaga Senki	Global A	Global A	2004-06-03^{JP}	Yes		
Nobunaga's Ambition: Iron Triangle •Nobunaga no Yabou: Kakushin^{JP} •Nobunaga no Yabou: Kakushin with Power-Up Kit (different version)	Koei	Koei	2006-02-02^{JP}	Yes		Yes
Nobunaga's Ambition: Rise to Power •Nobunaga no Yabou: Tenka Sousei^{JP} •Nobunaga no Yabou: Tenka Sousei with Power-Up Kit (different version)	Koei	Koei	2004-04-01^{JP}	Yes		Yes
Nodame Cantabile	Banpresto	Banpresto	2007-07-19^{JP}	Yes		
Noddy and the Magic Book	Neko Entertainment	The Game Factory	2006-10-13^{EU}		Yes	
Nogizaka Haruka no Himitsu Cosplay, Hajime Mashita	ASCII Media Works	ASCII Media Works	2008-09-25^{JP}	Yes		
The Noroi no Game •Simple 2000 Series Vol. 92: The Noroi no Game^{JP}	HuneX	D3 Publisher	2005-12-08^{JP}	Yes		
North Wind: Eien no Yakusoku	Datam Polystar	Datam Polystar	2005-04-28^{JP}	Yes		
NPPL Championship Paintball 2009 •The Millenium European Paintball Series: Championship Paintball 2009^{PAL}	Sand Grain Studios	Activision	2008-11-18^{NA}		Yes	Yes
NRA Gun Club •Gun Club^{PAL}	Crave Entertainment	Crave Entertainment, 505 Games^{PAL}	2006-10-02^{NA}		Yes ^{IT}	Yes
Nuga-Cel!	Lupinus	Idea Factory	2009-07-30^{JP}	Yes		
Nurse Witch Komugi-Chan Magical te	KID	KID	2004-02-26^{JP}	Yes		
Obliterate	Phoenix Games	Phoenix Games	2006-04-21^{AU}		Yes	
ObsCure	Hydravision Entertainment	Microïds^{EU}, DreamCatcher Interactive^{NA}	2004-10-01^{EU}		Yes	Yes
Obscure: The Aftermath •Obscure II^{PAL}	Hydravision Entertainment	Playlogic Entertainment^{PAL}, Ignition Entertainment^{NA}	2007-09-07^{EU}	Yes ^{KO}	Yes	Yes
Ocean Commander	CyberPlanet Interactive	Phoenix Games	2007^{EU}		Yes	
The Ochimusha – Doemu Samurai Toujou •Simple 2000 Series Vol. 118: The Ochimusha – Doemu Samurai Toujou^{JP}	Tamsoft	D3 Publisher	2007-05-31^{JP}	Yes		
Odin Sphere	Vanillaware	Atlus^{JP, KO, NA}, Square Enix^{PAL}	2007-05-17^{JP}	Yes ^{JP, KO}	Yes	Yes
Oekaki Puzzle •SuperLite 2000 Puzzle: Oekaki Puzzle^{JP}	Success	Success	2003-09-11^{JP}	Yes		
Offroad Extreme! •Offroad Extreme! Special Edition (different version)	Phoenix Games	Phoenix Games	2007^{EU}		Yes	
Ojousama Kumikyoku: Sweet Concert	Pionesoft	Pionesoft	2007-04-26^{JP}	Yes		
Okage: Shadow King •Boku to Maou^{JP}	Zener Works, Sony Computer Entertainment	Sony Computer Entertainment	2001-03-15^{JP}	Yes		Yes
Ōkami	Clover Studio	Capcom	2006-04-20^{JP}	Yes ^{JP, KO}	Yes	Yes
Omoi no Kakera: Close to	KID	KID	2003-07-24^{JP}	Yes		
Omoide ni Kawaru-Kimi: Memories Off	KID	KID	2002-11-28^{JP}	Yes		
One Piece Grand Adventure	Ganbarion	Namco Bandai Games	2006-08-29^{NA}	Yes ^{KO}	Yes	Yes
One Piece Grand Battle! •One Piece Grand Battle! Rush^{JP}	Ganbarion	Bandai	2005-03-17^{JP}	Yes	Yes	Yes
One Piece Grand Battle! 3	Ganbarion	Bandai	2003-12-11^{JP}	Yes		
One Piece: Pirates' Carnival	h.a.n.d.	Bandai	2005-11-23^{JP}	Yes		Yes
One Piece: Round the Land •One Piece Land Land^{JP}	Artdink	Bandai	2005-11-23^{JP}	Yes	Yes	
The Onēchanbara 2 •Simple 2000 Series Vol. 90: The Onēchanbara 2^{JP}	Tamsoft	D3 Publisher	2005-12-22^{JP}	Yes		
Oni	Bungie	Rockstar Games	2001-01-29^{NA}		Yes	Yes
Onimusha 2: Samurai's Destiny •Onimusha 2^{JP, KO}	Capcom	Capcom	2002-03-07^{JP}	Yes ^{JP, KO}	Yes	Yes
Onimusha 3: Demon Siege •Onimusha 3^{EU, JP, KO}	Capcom	Capcom	2004-02-26^{JP}	Yes ^{JP, KO}	Yes	Yes
Onimusha Blade Warriors •Onimusha Buraiden^{JP}	Capcom	Capcom	2003-11-27^{JP}	Yes	Yes	Yes
Onimusha: Dawn of Dreams •Shin Onimusha: Dawn of Dreams^{JP, KO}	Capcom Production Studio 2	Capcom	2006-01-26^{JP}	Yes ^{JP, KO}	Yes	Yes
Onimusha: Warlords •Onimusha^{JP}	Capcom	Capcom	2001-01-25^{JP}	Yes	Yes	Yes
Online Pro Wrestling	Yuke's	Yuke's	2004-05-06^{JP}	Yes		
Only You	AliceSoft	GeneX	2002-10-31^{JP}	Yes		
Onmyou Taisenki: Byakko Enbu	Matrix Software	Bandai	2005-03-31^{JP}	Yes		
Onmyou Taisenki: Hasha no In	Matrix Software	Bandai	2005-06-23^{JP}	Yes		
The Onna Okappichi Torimonochou – Oharuchan Go Go Go! •Simple 2000 Series Vol. 114: The Onna Okappichi Torimonochou – Oharuchan Go Go Go!^{JP}	Tamsoft	D3 Publisher	2007-02-22^{JP}	Yes		
Ōokuki	Global A	Global A	2008-06-05^{JP}	Yes		
Open Season	Ubisoft	Ubisoft	2006-09-19^{NA}		Yes	Yes
Operation Air Assault	InterActive Vision Games	Midas Interactive Entertainment	2005-02-25^{EU}		Yes	
Operation Air Assault 2	Naps Team	Midas Interactive Entertainment	2007-06-08^{EU}		Yes	
The Operative: No One Lives Forever	Monolith Productions	Sierra Entertainment	2002-04-16^{NA}		Yes	Yes
Orange Honey: Boku wa Kimi ni Koishiteru	guyzware	Marvelous Entertainment	2007-04-26^{JP}	Yes		
Orange Pocket: Root	Hooksoft	Pionesoft	2004-04-28^{JP}	Yes		
Ore no Shita de Agake	HuneX	D3 Publisher	2007-06-21^{JP}	Yes		
Orega Kantoku Da! Gekitou Pennant Race	Enix	Enix	2000-11-22^{JP}	Yes		
Orega Kantoku Da! Volume 2	Enix	Enix	2002-03-07^{JP}	Yes		
Oretachi Game Center Zoku: Akumajou Dracula	Hamster Corporation	Hamster Corporation	2006-05-25^{JP}	Yes		
Oretachi Game Center Zoku: BurgerTime	Hamster Corporation	Hamster Corporation	2005-10-27^{JP}	Yes		
Oretachi Game Center Zoku: Contra	Hamster Corporation	Hamster Corporation	2006-05-25^{JP}	Yes		
Oretachi Game Center Zoku: Crazy Climber	Hamster Corporation	Hamster Corporation	2005-07-21^{JP}	Yes		
Oretachi Game Center Zoku: Karate Dou	Hamster Corporation	Hamster Corporation	2005-07-21^{JP}	Yes		
Oretachi Game Center Zoku: Moon Cresta	Hamster Corporation	Hamster Corporation	2005-07-21^{JP}	Yes		
Oretachi Game Center Zoku: Nekketsu Kouka Kunio-Kun	Hamster Corporation	Hamster Corporation	2006-01-26^{JP}	Yes		
Oretachi Game Center Zoku: Nekketsu Koukou Dodge Ball Bu	Hamster Corporation	Hamster Corporation	2006-03-23^{JP}	Yes		
Oretachi Game Center Zoku: Pooyan	Hamster Corporation	Hamster Corporation	2006-05-25^{JP}	Yes		
Oretachi Game Center Zoku: Quarth	Hamster Corporation	Hamster Corporation	2006-01-26^{JP}	Yes		
Oretachi Game Center Zoku: Rabio Lepus	Hamster Corporation	Hamster Corporation	2006-03-23^{JP}	Yes		
Oretachi Game Center Zoku: Scramble	Hamster Corporation	Hamster Corporation	2005-07-21^{JP}	Yes		
Oretachi Game Center Zoku: Sonic Wings	Hamster Corporation	Hamster Corporation	2005-07-21^{JP}	Yes		
Oretachi Game Center Zoku: Super Volleyball	Hamster Corporation	Hamster Corporation	2005-10-27^{JP}	Yes		
Oretachi Game Center Zoku: Terra Cresta	Hamster Corporation	Hamster Corporation	2005-10-27^{JP}	Yes		
Oretachi Game Center Zoku: Thunder Cross	Hamster Corporation	Hamster Corporation	2007-02-08^{JP}	Yes		
Oretachi Game Center Zoku: Time Pilot	Hamster Corporation	Hamster Corporation	2005-07-21^{JP}	Yes		
Oretachi Game Center Zoku: Trio the Punch	Hamster Corporation	Hamster Corporation	2007-02-08^{JP}	Yes		
Oretachi Game Center Zoku: Yie Ar Kung Fu	Hamster Corporation	Hamster Corporation	2005-10-27^{JP}	Yes		
Orphen: Scion of Sorcery •Sorcerous Stabber Orphen^{JP}	Shade	Kadokawa Games^{JP}, Activision^{EU, NA}	2000-08-03^{JP}	Yes	Yes	Yes
Oshiete! Popotan	Success	Kadokawa Games	2004-03-11^{JP}	Yes		
Osouji Sentai Clean Keeper H	Lupinus	Idea Factory	2009-10-01^{JP}	Yes		
Othello •SuperLite 2000 Table: Othello^{JP}	Success	Success	2003-07-31^{JP}	Yes		
The Otoko Tachi no Kijū Houza •Simple 2000 Series Vol. 100: The Otoko Tachi no Kijū Houza^{JP}	Opus	D3 Publisher	2006-06-29^{JP}	Yes		
Otome no Jijou	Nine'sFox	Nine'sFox	2006-09-28^{JP}	Yes		
Otome wa Boku ni Koishiteru	Alchemist	Alchemist	2005-12-29^{JP}	Yes		
Otometeki Koi Kakumei * Love Revo!!	HuneX	Interchannel	2006-01-26^{JP}	Yes		
Otona no Gal Jan 2	Jaleco	Jaleco	2005-11-23^{JP}	Yes		
Otona no Gal Jan: Kimi ni Hane Man	Pacific Century Cyber Works	Pacific Century Cyber Works	2003-12-18^{JP}	Yes		
Otostaz	Sony Computer Entertainment	Sony Computer Entertainment	2002-05-30^{JP}	Yes		
Ougon Kishi Garo	Bitstep	Bandai	2006-04-20^{JP}	Yes		
Ouka	Pionesoft	Pionesoft	2006-05-25^{JP}	Yes		
Ouran Koukou Host-Bu	Design Factory	Idea Factory	2007-04-19^{JP}	Yes		
Outlaw Golf	Hypnotix	TDK Mediactive	2003-11-21^{EU}		Yes	
Outlaw Golf 2	Hypnotix	Global Star Software	2004-11-25^{NA}		Yes	Yes
Outlaw Tennis	Hypnotix	Global Star Software	2005-07-26^{NA}		Yes	Yes
Outlaw Volleyball Remixed	Hypnotix	TDK Mediactive^{EU}, Global Star Software^{NA}	2004-04-08^{EU}		Yes	Yes
OutRun 2006: Coast 2 Coast	Sumo Digital	Sega	2006-03-31^{EU}		Yes	Yes
OutRun2 SP Special Tours (Note: update for OutRun 2006: Coast 2 Coast.)	Sumo Digital	Sega	2007-02-08^{JP}	Yes		
Over the Hedge	Edge of Reality	Activision	2006-05-09^{NA}		Yes	Yes
Over the Monochrome Rainbow featuring Shogo Hamada	Opera House	Sony Music Entertainment	2003-03-19^{NA}	Yes		
Pachinko de Yūbou! Fever Dodeka Saurus	ICS	ICS	2002-05-02^{JP}	Yes		
PachiPara 12: Ooumi to Natsu no Omoide	Irem	Irem	2005-12-15^{JP}	Yes		
PachiPara 13: Super Umi to Pachi-Pro Fūunroku	Irem	Irem	2006-10-26^{JP}	Yes		
PachiPara 14: Fū to Kumo to Super Umi in Okinawa	Irem	Irem	2007-07-26^{JP}	Yes		
Pachi-Slot Aruze Oukoku 6	Aruze	Aruze	2001-12-13^{JP}	Yes		
Pachi-Slot Aruze Oukoku 7	Aruze	Aruze	2002-08-08^{JP}	Yes		
Pachi-Slot Club Collection: IM Juggler EX – Juggler Selection	Commseed	Commseed	2007-02-22^{JP}	Yes		
Pachi-Slot Club Collection: Pachi-Slot Dayo Koumon Chama	Commseed	Commseed	2005-11-17^{JP}	Yes		
Pachi-Slot Higurashi no Naku Koro ni Matsuri	Alchemist	Alchemist	2010-04-22^{JP}	Yes		
Pachi-Slot Kanzen Kouryaku: Gigazone	Syscom	Syscom	2002-10-17^{JP}	Yes		
Pachi-Slot Kanzen Kouryoku: Onihama Bakusou Gurentai: Gekitou-Hen	Success	Success	2005-06-30^{JP}	Yes		
Pachi-Slot Kanzen Kouryoku: Slot Genjin	Success	Success	2006-11-30^{JP}	Yes		
Pachi-Slot King! Kagaku Ninja-Tai Gatchaman	Banpresto	Banpresto	2007-02-22^{JP}	Yes		
Pachi-Slot Nobunaga no Yabou: Tenka Sousei	Koei	Koei	2006-03-30^{JP}	Yes		
Pachi-Slot Toukon Denshou	Success	Success	2004-05-13^{JP}	Yes		
Pachi-Slot Winning Post	Koei	Koei	2005-07-28^{JP}	Yes		
Pachitte Chonmage Tatsujin 10: Pachinko Fuyu no Sonata	Hack Berry	Hack Berry	2007-01-25^{JP}	Yes		
Pachitte Chonmage Tatsujin 11: Pachinko Kaou: Misora Hibari	Hack Berry	Hack Berry	2007-03-21^{JP}	Yes		
Pachitte Chonmage Tatsujin 12: Pachinko Ultraman	Hack Berry	Hack Berry	2007-05-24^{JP}	Yes		
Pachitte Chonmage Tatsujin 13: Pachinko Hissatsu Shigotojin III	Hack Berry	Hack Berry	2007-11-22^{JP}	Yes		
Pachitte Chonmage Tatsujin 14: Pachinko Kamen Rider: Shocker Zenmetsu Daisakusen	Hack Berry	Hack Berry	2008-02-21^{JP}	Yes		
Pachitte Chonmage Tatsujin 15: Pachinko Fuyu no Sonata 2	Hack Berry	Hack Berry	2008-12-25^{JP}	Yes		
Pachitte Chonmage Tatsujin 16: Pachinko Hissatsu Shigotonin III	Hack Berry	Hack Berry	2010-05-27^{JP}	Yes		
Pachitte Chonmage Tatsujin 2: CR Jurassic Park	Hack Berry	Hack Berry	2003-02-06^{JP}	Yes		
Pachitte Chonmage Tatsujin 3	Hack Berry	Hack Berry	2003-04-17^{JP}	Yes		
Pachitte Chonmage Tatsujin 4	Hack Berry	Hack Berry	2003-05-29^{JP}	Yes		
Pachitte Chonmage Tatsujin 5: CR Kamen Rider	Hack Berry	Hack Berry	2004-04-15^{JP}	Yes		
Pachitte Chonmage Tatsujin 6: CR Pachinko Yellow Cab	Hack Berry	Hack Berry	2004-07-15^{JP}	Yes		
Pachitte Chonmage Tatsujin 7: CR Pachinko Dokaben	Hack Berry	Hack Berry	2004-10-07^{JP}	Yes		
Pachitte Chonmage Tatsujin 8	Hack Berry	Hack Berry	2005-08-04^{JP}	Yes		
Pachitte Chonmage Tatsujin 9: Pachinko Mitokoumon	Hack Berry	Hack Berry	2005-10-27^{JP}	Yes		
Pachitte Chonmage Tatsujin: CR Nettou Power Pro Kun	Hack Berry	Hack Berry	2001-12-20^{JP}	Yes		
Pacific Warriors II: Dogfight	InterActive Vision Games	Midas Interactive Entertainment	2004-10-01^{EU}		Yes	
Pac-Man Fever	Mass Media Games	Namco Hometek	2002-09-02^{NA}			Yes
Pac-Man World 2	Namco Hometek	Namco^{JP}, Namco Hometek^{NA}, Sony Computer Entertainment^{PAL}	2002-02-24^{NA}	Yes	Yes	Yes
Pac-Man World 3	Blitz Games	Namco Hometek^{NA}, Electronic Arts^{PAL}	2005-11-15^{NA}		Yes	Yes
Pac-Man World Rally	Smart Bomb Interactive	Namco Bandai Games^{NA}, Electronic Arts^{PAL}	2006-08-22^{NA}		Yes	Yes
Paddington Bear	Atomic Planet Entertainment	Blast! Entertainment Ltd	2007-11-22^{AU}		Yes	
Pai Chenjan	Agenda	Agenda	2001-11-22^{JP}	Yes		
Palais de Reine	Kogado Studio	Interchannel	2007-10-18^{JP}	Yes		
Pandora: Kimi no Namae o Boku wa Shiru	Otomate	Idea Factory	2010-11-18^{JP}	Yes		
Panel Quiz Attack 25	DigiCube	DigiCube	2002-08-29^{JP}	Yes		
Panic Palette	Takuyo	Takuyo	2007-05-31^{JP}	Yes		
Panzer Elite Action: Fields of Glory	ZootFly	JoWooD Productions	2006-07-14^{EU}		Yes	
Panzer Front Ausf.B	Enterbrain	Enterbrain^{JP}, 505 Game Street^{PAL}	2004-05-27^{EU}	Yes	Yes	
Paparazzi •Simple 2000 Series Vol. 53: The Camera Kozou^{JP}	HuneX	D3 Publisher^{JP}, 505 Game Street^{EU}	2004-06-24^{JP}	Yes	Yes	
Para Para Paradise	Konami	Konami	2001-03-15^{JP}	Yes		
PaRappa the Rapper 2	NanaOn-Sha	Sony Computer Entertainment	2001-08-30^{JP}	Yes	Yes	Yes
Parfait: Chocolat Second Style	Alchemist	Alchemist	2006-06-29^{JP}	Yes		
Paris-Dakar Rally	Broadsword Interactive	Acclaim Entertainment	2001-09-07^{EU}		Yes	Yes
Party Carnival •Simple 2000 Series Vol. 89: The Party Game 2^{JP}	HuneX	D3 Publisher^{JP}, Essential Games^{EU}	2005-11-10^{JP}	Yes	Yes	
Party Girls •Simple 2000 Series Vol. 63: The Suieitaikai^{JP}	Tamsoft	D3 Publisher^{JP}, 505 Game Street^{EU}	2004-09-30^{JP}	Yes	Yes	
The Party Quiz: Akko ni Omakase •Simple 2000 Series Vol. 79: The Party Quiz: Akko ni Omakase^{JP}	Tamsoft	D3 Publisher	2005-10-20^{JP}	Yes		
The Party Unou Quiz •Simple 2000 Series Vol. 66: The Party Unou Quiz^{JP}	IMJ Entertainment	D3 Publisher	2004-11-11^{JP}	Yes		
Patisserie na Nyanko	Pionesoft	Pionesoft	2004-09-22^{JP}	Yes		
PDC World Championship Darts	Mere Mortals	Oxygen Games^{EU}, Red Ant Enterprises^{AU}	2006-12-01^{EU}		Yes	
PDC World Championship Darts 2008	Oxygen Games	Oxygen Games^{PAL}, O-Games^{NA}	2008-01-25^{EU}		Yes	Yes
Perfect Ace 2: The Championships	Aqua Pacific	Oxygen Games	2005-07-15^{EU}		Yes	
Perfect Ace: Pro Tournament Tennis	Aqua Pacific	Oxygen Games	2003-07-04^{EU}		Yes	
Persona 3	Atlus	Atlus^{JP, KO, NA}, Koei^{PAL}	2006-07-13^{JP}	Yes ^{JP, KO}	Yes	Yes
Persona 3 FES (Note: expansion for Persona 3.)	Atlus	Atlus	2007-04-19^{JP}	Yes ^{JP, KO}	Yes	Yes
Persona 4	Atlus	Atlus^{JP, KO, NA}, Square Enix^{PAL}	2008-07-10^{JP}	Yes ^{JP, KO}	Yes	Yes
Petanque Pro	Mere Mortals	Bigben Interactive	2007-03-23^{EU}		Yes	
Peter Jackson's King Kong: The Official Game of the Movie	Ubisoft Montpellier	Ubisoft	2005-11-17^{EU}	Yes ^{JP, KO}	Yes	Yes
Peter Pan	Phoenix Games	Phoenix Games	2007^{EU}		Yes	
Peter Pan: The Legend of Never Land	Blue 52	Sony Computer Entertainment	2005-10-21^{EU}		Yes	
Petit Four	Design Factory	Idea Factory	2008-02-28^{JP}	Yes		
Petz: Catz 2	Yuke's	Ubisoft	2007-11-23^{NA}		Yes	Yes
Petz: Dogz 2	Yuke's	Ubisoft	2007-11-23^{NA}		Yes	Yes
Petz: Horsez 2 •Alexandra Ledermann: The Stud in the Valley^{FR} •Pippa Funnell 2: Ranch Rescue^{UK}	Ubisoft	Ubisoft	2007-10-25^{EU}		Yes	Yes
Phantasy Star Universe	Sonic Team	Sega	2006-08-31^{JP}	Yes	Yes	Yes
Phantasy Star Universe: Ambition of the Illuminus •Phantasy Star Universe: Illuminas no Yabou^{JP} (Note: stand-alone expansion for Phantasy Star Universe.)	Sonic Team	Sega	2007-09-27^{JP}	Yes	Yes	Yes
Phantom Brave •Phantom Brave: 2-shūme Hajime Mashita^{JP}	Nippon Ichi Software	Nippon Ichi Software^{JP}, NIS America^{NA}, Koei^{EU}	2004-01-22^{JP}	Yes	Yes	Yes
Phantom: Phantom of Inferno	PrincessSoft	PrincessSoft	2003-05-22^{JP}	Yes		
Phase Paradox	Sony Computer Entertainment	Sony Computer Entertainment	2001-05-24^{JP}	Yes		
Pia Carrot e Youkoso!! 3	Alpha Unit	Interchannel	2003-03-27^{JP}	Yes		
Pia Carrot e Youkoso!! G.O. Summer Fair	Cocktail Soft	Piacci	2007-12-20^{JP}	Yes		
Pia Carrot e Youkoso!! G.P. Gakuen Princess	Piacci	Piacci	2009-01-22^{JP}	Yes		
Pilot Down: Behind Enemy Lines	Kuju Entertainment	Oxygen Games	2005-09-09^{EU}		Yes	
Pilot ni Narou! 2	Beluga Computer	Victor Interactive Software	2001-03-08^{JP}	Yes		
Pimp My Ride	Eutechnyx	Activision	2006-11-21^{NA}		Yes	Yes
Pimp My Ride: Street Racing	Virtuos	Activision	2009-03-16^{NA}		Yes	Yes
Pinball •American Arcade^{JP}	Astroll	Astroll^{JP}, Play It!^{EU}	2000-09-07^{JP}	Yes	Yes	
Pinball Fun •Simple 2000 Series Vol. 26: The Pinball x 3^{JP}	HuneX	D3 Publisher^{JP}, 505 Game Street^{EU}	2003-04-24^{JP}	Yes	Yes	
Pinball Hall of Fame: The Gottlieb Collection •Gottlieb Pinball Classics^{EU}	FarSight Studios	Crave Entertainment^{NA}, Play It!^{EU}	2004-11-16^{NA}		Yes	Yes
Pinball Hall of Fame: The Williams Collection	FarSight Studios	Crave Entertainment	2008-02-26^{NA}			Yes
Pink Pong •Simple 2000 Ultimate Series Vol. 15: Love * Ping Pong!^{JP}	HuneX	D3 Publisher^{JP}, 505 Game Street^{EU}	2003-12-11^{JP}	Yes	Yes	
Pinocchio	Phoenix Games	Phoenix Games	2006-12-08^{EU}		Yes	
Pipe Mania	Razorworks Studios	Empire Interactive	2008-09-26^{EU, NA}		Yes	Yes
Pipo Saru 2001	Japan Studio	Sony Computer Entertainment	2001-07-05^{JP}	Yes		
Pirates: Legend of the Black Buccaneer	WideScreen Games	Valcon Games^{NA}, 10tacle Studios^{EU}	2006-08-15^{NA}		Yes	Yes
Pirates of the Caribbean: At World's End	Eurocom Entertainment Software	Disney Interactive Studios	2007-05-22^{NA}	Yes	Yes	Yes
Pirates of the Caribbean: The Legend of Jack Sparrow	7 Studios	Bethesda Softworks^{NA}, Ubisoft^{EU}	2006-06-28^{NA}		Yes	Yes
Pirates: The Legend of Black Kat	Westwood Studios	Electronic Arts	2002-02-17^{NA}		Yes	Yes
Pitfall: The Lost Expedition	Edge of Reality	Activision	2004-02-18^{NA}		Yes	Yes
Piyo-Tan: Oyashiki Sennyū Daisakusen!	Prototype	Prototype	2008-08-28^{JP}	Yes		
Pizzicato Polka: Suisei Genya	KID	KID	2004-06-17^{JP}	Yes		
The Plan	EKO Software	Ghostlight^{EU}, Crave Entertainment^{NA}	2006-03-31^{EU}		Yes	Yes
Plarail: Yume ga Ippai!	Tomy	Tomy	2002-01-31^{JP}	Yes		
Playboy: The Mansion	Cyberlore Studios	Arush Entertainment^{NA}, Groove Games^{NA}, Ubisoft^{PAL}	2005-01-25^{NA}		Yes	Yes
Playwize Poker & Casino	Bits Studios	505 Game Street	2006-11-24^{EU}		Yes	
Plus Plumb 2 Again	Takuyo	Takuyo	2006-05-18^{JP}	Yes		
Pochinya	Aiky	Bandai	2004-10-28^{JP}	Yes		
Poi! Hito Natsu no Keiken!?	Design Factory	Idea Factory	2008-07-17^{JP}	Yes		
Poinie's Poin	Sony Computer Entertainment	Sony Computer Entertainment	2002-09-26^{JP}	Yes		
Poker Masters	Mere Mortals	Liquid Games	2005-05-04^{EU}		Yes	
The Polar Express	Blue Tongue Entertainment	THQ	2004-11-02^{NA}		Yes	Yes
Polaroid Pete •Gekibo 2^{JP}	Irem	Irem^{JP}, Virgin Interactive^{EU}	2001-05-31^{JP}	Yes	Yes	
Police 24/7 •The Keisatsukan: Shinjuku Cop 24 Hours^{JP}	Konami	Konami	2001-11-15^{JP}	Yes	Yes	
Police Chase Down •Simple 2000 Ultimate Series Vol. 7: Saikyou! Shiro Biking – Security Police^{JP}	Tamsoft	D3 Publisher^{JP}, Agetec^{EU}	2003-04-24^{JP}	Yes	Yes	
Pool Paradise •Archer Maclean's Pool Paradise^{EU}	Awesome Developments	Ignition Entertainment	2004-04-02^{EU}		Yes	Yes
Pool Paradise: International Edition	Conspiracy Entertainment	Ignition Entertainment	2006-07-07^{EU}		Yes	
Pool Shark 2	Blade Interactive	Zoo Digital Publishing	2004-11-12^{EU}		Yes	
PopCap Hits! Vol. 1	PopCap	PopCap	2007-11-15^{NA}			Yes
PopCap Hits! Vol. 2	PopCap	PopCap	2008-07-15^{NA}			Yes
Pop'n Music 10	Konami	Konami	2004-11-18^{JP}	Yes		
Pop'n Music 11	Konami	Konami	2005-07-21^{JP}	Yes		
Pop'n Music 12 Iroha	Konami	Konami	2006-03-02^{JP}	Yes		
Pop'n Music 13 Carnival	Konami	Konami	2006-09-28^{JP}	Yes		
Pop'n Music 14 Fever!	Konami	Konami	2007-07-12^{JP}	Yes		
Pop'n Music 7	Konami	Konami	2002-11-21^{JP}	Yes		
Pop'n Music 8	Konami	Konami	2003-07-03^{JP}	Yes		
Pop'n Music 9	Konami	Konami	2004-02-19^{JP}	Yes		
Pop'n Music: Best Hits	Konami	Konami	2003-02-27^{JP}	Yes		
Pop'n Taisen Puzzle-Dama Online	Konami	Konami	2004-03-04^{JP}	Yes		
PoPoLoCrois: Hajimari no Bouken	Sony Computer Entertainment	Sony Computer Entertainment	2002-06-20^{JP}	Yes		
PoPoLoCrois: Tsuki no Okite no Bouken	Sony Computer Entertainment	Sony Computer Entertainment	2004-03-18^{JP}	Yes		
PopStar Guitar	Broadsword Interactive	XS Games	2008-10-28^{NA}			Yes
Portal Runner	3DO	3DO	2001-09-11^{NA}		Yes	Yes
Postman Pat	The Code Monkeys	Blast! Entertainment Ltd	2008-01-24^{AU}		Yes	
Power Drome •Powerdrome^{EU}	Argonaut Games	Mud Duck Productions^{NA}, Evolved Games^{EU}	2004-06-15^{NA}		Yes	Yes
Power Rangers: Dino Thunder	Pacific Coast Power & Light	THQ	2004-09-14^{NA}		Yes	Yes
Power Rangers: Super Legends – 15th Anniversary •Power Rangers: Super Legends^{PAL}	Artificial Mind and Movement	Disney Interactive Studios	2007-11-06^{NA}		Yes	Yes
Power Volleyball	Phoenix Games	Phoenix Games	2007-01-26^{EU}		Yes	
The Powerpuff Girls: Relish Rampage	VIS Entertainment	BAM! Entertainment	2002-11-24^{NA}		Yes	Yes
Powershot Pinball	Liquid Games	OG International Ltd	2006-07-07^{EU}		Yes	
Predator: Concrete Jungle	Eurocom	Vivendi Universal Games	2005-04-15^{EU}		Yes	Yes
Premier Manager 08	Zoo Digital Publishing	Zoo Digital Publishing	2007-08-17^{EU}		Yes	
Premier Manager 09	Zoo Digital Publishing	Zoo Digital Publishing	2008-08-15^{EU}		Yes	
Premier Manager 2002/2003 Season	Runecraft	Zoo Digital Publishing	2002-11-22^{EU}		Yes	
Premier Manager 2003–04	Zoo Digital Publishing	Zoo Digital Publishing	2003-12-19^{EU}		Yes	
Premier Manager 2004–2005	Zoo Digital Publishing	Zoo Digital Publishing	2004-11-05^{EU}		Yes	
Premier Manager 2005–2006	Zoo Digital Publishing	Zoo Digital Publishing	2005-08-11^{EU}		Yes	
Premier Manager 2006–2007	Zoo Digital Publishing	Zoo Digital Publishing	2006-08-18^{EU}		Yes	
Pride FC: Fighting Championships •Pride^{JP}	Anchor Inc.	THQ^{EU, NA}, Capcom^{JP}	2003-02-11^{NA}	Yes	Yes	Yes
PrideGP Grand Prix 2003	Capcom	Capcom	2003-11-13^{JP}	Yes		
Primal •Saints: Seinaru Mamono^{JP}	SCE Studio Cambridge	Sony Computer Entertainment	2003-03-25^{NA}	Yes	Yes	Yes
Primal Image vol. 1 (Note: photography game with scored challenges.)	Atlus	Atlus	2000-04-27^{JP}	Yes		
Primopuel	Bandai	Bandai	2003-11-27^{JP}	Yes		
Prince of Persia: The Sands of Time •Prince of Persia: Jikan no Suna^{JP}	Ubisoft	Ubisoft	2003-11-10^{NA}	Yes	Yes	Yes
Prince of Persia: The Two Thrones •Prince of Persia: Futatsu no Tamashii^{JP}	Ubisoft Montreal	Ubisoft	2005-12-01^{NA}	Yes	Yes	Yes
Prince of Persia: Warrior Within •Prince of Persia: Kenshi no Kokoro^{JP}	Ubisoft Montreal	Ubisoft	2004-11-30^{NA}	Yes	Yes	Yes
Prince of Tennis: Form the Strongest Team! •Tennis no Oji-Sama: Saikyou Team o Kessei Seyo!^{JP}	Konami	Konami	2004-09-16^{JP}	Yes		
Princess Concerto	Headlock	Broccoli	2007-09-20^{JP}	Yes		
Princess Holiday: Korogaru Ringotei Senya Ichiya	August	Alchemist	2004-05-27^{JP}	Yes		
Princess Lover! Eternal Love for My Lady	Comfort	Comfort	2010-01-28^{JP}	Yes		
Princess Maker	CyberFront	Gainax	2004-04-28^{JP}	Yes ^{JP, KO}		
Princess Maker 2	CyberFront	Gainax	2004-09-30^{JP}	Yes ^{JP, KO}		
Princess Maker 4	GeneX	Gainax	2005-09-01^{JP}	Yes ^{JP, KO}		
Princess Maker 5	Gainax	CyberFront	2008-02-07^{JP}	Yes		
Princess Nightmare	Karin Entertainment	Karin Entertainment	2008-04-24^{JP}	Yes		
Princess Princess	Marvelous Entertainment	Marvelous Entertainment	2006-10-26^{JP}	Yes		
Pri-Saga! Princess o Sagase!	Abel Software	Views	2007-11-22^{JP}	Yes		
Prism Ark: Awake	5pb	5pb	2008-04-24^{JP}	Yes		
Prisoner of War	Wide Games	Codemasters	2002-07-19^{EU}		Yes	
Private Nurse: Maria	Angel Smile	Datam Polystar	2003-09-25^{JP}	Yes		
Pro Biker 2	Phoenix Games	Phoenix Games	2007^{EU}		Yes	
Pro Bull Riders: Out of the Chute	D2C Games	Crave Entertainment	2008-10-28^{NA}			Yes
Pro Evolution Soccer •World Soccer Winning Eleven 5^{JP}	Konami	Konami	2001-03-15^{JP}	Yes	Yes	
Pro Evolution Soccer 2008 •World Soccer Winning Eleven 2008^{JP}	Konami	Konami	2007-10-26^{EU}	Yes	Yes	Yes
Pro Evolution Soccer 2009 •World Soccer Winning Eleven 2009^{JP}	Konami	Konami	2008-10-31^{EU}	Yes	Yes	Yes
Pro Evolution Soccer 2010 •World Soccer Winning Eleven 2010^{JP}	Konami	Konami	2009-11-06^{EU}	Yes	Yes	Yes
Pro Evolution Soccer 2011 •World Soccer Winning Eleven 2011^{AS, JP}	Konami	Konami	2010-10-29^{EU}	Yes ^{AS, JP}	Yes	Yes
Pro Evolution Soccer 2012 •World Soccer Winning Eleven 2012^{JP, KO}	Konami	Konami	2011-10-28^{EU}	Yes ^{JP, KO}	Yes	Yes
Pro Evolution Soccer 2013	Konami	Konami	2012-09-25^{NA}		Yes	Yes
Pro Evolution Soccer 2014	Konami	Konami	2013-11-08^{EU}		Yes	
Pro Evolution Soccer Management	Konami	Konami	2006-03-24^{EU}		Yes	
Pro Mahjong Kiwame Next	Athena	Athena	2000-08-31^{JP}	Yes		
Pro Race Driver •DTM Race Driver^{GER} •TOCA Race Driver^{UK} •V8 Supercars: Race Driver^{AU}	Codemasters	Codemasters	2002-08-23^{FR}		Yes	Yes
Pro Rally 2002	Ubisoft Barcelona	Ubisoft	2002-03-28^{EU}		Yes	
The Pro Yakyū: 2003 Pennant Race •Simple 2000 Series Vol. 27: The Pro Yakyū: 2003 Pennant Race^{JP}	Smilebit	Sega	2003-04-24^{JP}	Yes		
Pro Yakyū Japan 2001	Konami	Konami	2001-11-08^{JP}	Yes		
Pro Yakyū Netsu Star 2006	Namco	Namco	2006-04-06^{JP}	Yes		
Pro Yakyū Netsu Star 2007	Bandai Namco Games	Bandai Namco Games	2007-04-05^{JP}	Yes		
Pro Yakyū Simulation Dugout '03: The Turning Point	DigiCube	DigiCube	2003-06-26^{JP}	Yes		
Pro Yakyū Spirits 2	Konami	Konami	2005-04-07^{JP}	Yes		
Pro Yakyū Spirits 2004	Konami	Konami	2004-03-25^{JP}	Yes		
Pro Yakyū Spirits 2004 Climax (Note: update for Pro Yakyū Spirits 2004.)	Konami	Konami	2004-09-16^{JP}	Yes		
Pro Yakyū Spirits 2010	Konami	Konami	2010-04-01^{JP}	Yes		
Pro Yakyū Spirits 3	Konami	Konami	2006-04-06^{JP}	Yes		
Pro Yakyū Spirits 4	Konami	Konami	2007-04-01^{JP}	Yes		
Pro Yakyū Spirits 5	Konami	Konami	2008-04-01^{JP}	Yes		
Pro Yakyū Spirits 5 Kanzenban (Note: update for Pro Yakyū Spirits 5.)	Konami	Konami	2008-12-04^{JP}	Yes		
Pro Yakyū Spirits 6	Konami	Konami	2009-07-16^{JP}	Yes		
Pro Yakyū Team o Tsukurou! 2	Smilebit	Sega	2003-02-13^{JP}	Yes		
Pro Yakyū Team o Tsukurou! 2003	Smilebit	Sega	2003-11-20^{JP}	Yes		
Pro Yakyū Team o Tsukurou! 3	Smilebit	Sega	2005-07-28^{JP}	Yes		
Project Arms	Shade	Bandai	2002-03-28^{JP}	Yes		
Project Eden	Core Design Ltd.	Eidos Interactive	2001-10-22^{NA}		Yes	Yes
Project FIFA World Cup: Sorenara Kimi ga Daihyo Kantoku	Electronic Arts	Electronic Arts Victor	2002-05-30^{JP}	Yes		
Project Minerva	Flat-Out	D3 Publisher	2002-08-22^{JP}	Yes		
Project Minerva Professional •Simple 2000 Ultimate Series Vol. 23: Project Minerva Professional^{JP} (Note: update for Project Minerva.)	Flat-Out	D3 Publisher^{JP}, Midas Interactive Entertainment^{EU}	2002-08-22^{JP}	Yes	Yes	
Project: Snowblind	Crystal Dynamics	Eidos Interactive	2005-02-22^{NA}		Yes	Yes
ProStroke Golf: World Tour 2007	Gusto Games	Oxygen Games	2006-08-18^{EU}		Yes	Yes
Pryzm Chapter One: The Dark Unicorn	Digital Illusions	TDK Mediactive	2002-06-10^{NA}		Yes	Yes
Psi-Ops: The Mindgate Conspiracy •Psi-Ops: Psychic Operation^{JP}	Midway Games	Midway Games	2004-06-14^{NA}	Yes	Yes	Yes
Psychic Force Complete	Taito	Taito	2005-12-29^{JP}	Yes		
Psychonauts	Double Fine, Budcat Creations	Majesco	2005-06-22^{NA}		Yes	Yes
Psyvariar 2: Ultimate Final	Skonec	Success	2004-12-09^{JP}	Yes		
Psyvariar: Medium Unit	Skonec	Success	2003-09-11^{JP}	Yes		
Psyvariar Revision •SuperLite 2000 Shooting: Psyvariar Revision^{JP} (Note: update for Psyvariar: Medium Unit.)	Skonec	Success	2003-10-09^{JP}	Yes		
P.T.O. IV: Pacific Theater of Operations •Teitoku no Ketsudan IV^{JP}	Koei	Koei	2002-03-28^{JP}	Yes	Yes	Yes
Pump It Up Exceed	Andamiro U.S.A. Corp	Andamiro U.S.A. Corp^{KO}, Mastiff^{NA}	2004-11-30^{KO}	Yes ^{KO}		Yes
The Punisher	Volition	THQ	2005-01-17^{NA}		Yes	Yes
Pure Pure: Mimi to Shippo no Monogatari	Klein	Datam Polystar	2005-01-27^{JP}	Yes		
Pure x Cure Recovery	Alchemist	Alchemist	2007-08-23^{JP}	Yes		
Puyo Pop Fever •Puyo Puyo Fever^{JP}	Sonic Team	Sega	2004-02-04^{JP}	Yes	Yes	
Puyo Puyo! 15th Anniversary	Sonic Team	Sega	2007-03-21^{JP}	Yes		
Puyo Puyo Fever 2	Sonic Team	Sega	2005-11-24^{JP}	Yes		
Puzzle Challenge: Crosswords and More!	Supersonic Software	Crave Entertainment	2006-06-09^{NA}			Yes
Puzzle Maniacs •Simple 2000 Series Vol. 23: The Puzzle Collection 2,000-Mon^{JP}	HuneX	D3 Publisher^{JP}, 505 Game Street^{EU}	2003-03-27^{JP}	Yes	Yes	
Puzzle Party: 10 Games	Phoenix Games	Phoenix Games	2006-07-28^{EU}		Yes	
Puzzle Quest: Challenge of the Warlords	Infinite Interactive	D3 Publisher	2007-11-13^{NA}		Yes	Yes
Pyū to Fuku! Jaguar Ashita no Jump	Konami	Konami	2004-03-18^{JP}	Yes		
Q-Ball Billiards Master •Doukyu Billiard Master 2^{JP} •Pool Master^{EU}	Ornith	ASK^{JP}, Take-Two Interactive^{EU, NA}	2000-03-30^{JP}	Yes	Yes	Yes
Quake III Revolution	Bullfrog Productions	Electronic Arts^{EU, NA}, Square EA^{JP}	2001-03-26^{NA}	Yes	Yes	Yes
Quartet! The Stage of Love	PrincessSoft	PrincessSoft	2006-09-28^{JP}	Yes		
Que: Ancient Leaf no Yousei	PrincessSoft	PrincessSoft	2007-06-28^{JP}	Yes		
The Quest for Aladdin's Treasure	Broadsword Interactive	Oxygen Games	2007-09-07^{EU}		Yes	
Quest for Sleeping Beauty	Spiral House	Liquid Games	2006-02-17^{EU}		Yes	
Quiz & Variety SukuSuku Inufuku 2: Motto SukuSuku	Hamster Corporation	Hamster Corporation	2007-08-23^{JP}	Yes		
The Quiz 20,000 Mon •Simple 2000 Series Vol. 12: The Quiz 20,000 Mon^{JP}	Warashi	D3 Publisher	2002-11-07^{JP}	Yes		
R: Racing Evolution	Namco	Namco	2003-11-27^{JP}	Yes	Yes	Yes
Raceway: Drag & Stock Racing	Midas Interactive Entertainment	Midas Interactive Entertainment	2006-09-29^{EU}		Yes	
Racing Battle: C1 Grand Prix	Genki	Genki	2005-05-26^{JP}	Yes		
Radiata Stories	tri-Ace	Square Enix	2005-01-27^{JP}	Yes		Yes
Radio Helicopter •Simple 2000 Series Vol. 35: The Helicopter^{JP}	Tomcat System	D3 Publisher^{JP}, 505 Game Street^{EU}	2003-09-25^{JP}	Yes	Yes	
Radio Helicopter II •Puchi Copter 2^{JP}	Aqua Systems	Taito^{JP}, 505 Game Street^{EU}	2005-07-14^{JP}	Yes	Yes	
Radirgy Precious	MileStone Inc.	MileStone Inc.	2006-05-25^{JP}	Yes		
Raging Blades •Raging Bless: Gouma Mokushiroku^{JP}	Pacific Century Cyber Works	Pacific Century Cyber Works^{JP}, Wanadoo Edition^{EU}	2002-06-06^{JP}	Yes	Yes	
Rahxephon: Soukyū Gensoukyoku	Bandai	Bandai	2003-08-07^{JP}	Yes		
Raiden III	MOSS	Taito^{JP}, 505 Game Street^{EU}, UFO Interactive^{NA}	2005-09-22^{JP}	Yes	Yes	Yes
Raimuiro Senkitan * Jun	Kadokawa Games	Kadokawa Games	2004-03-25^{JP}	Yes		
Rakushou! Pachi-Slot Sengen	Tecmo	Tecmo	2003-10-23^{JP}	Yes		
Rakushou! Pachi-Slot Sengen 2	Tecmo	Tecmo	2004-10-28^{JP}	Yes		
Rakushou! Pachi-Slot Sengen 3	Tecmo	Tecmo	2005-06-23^{JP}	Yes		
Rakushou! Pachi-Slot Sengen 4	Tecmo	Tecmo	2006-03-23^{JP}	Yes		
Rakushou! Pachi-Slot Sengen 5: Rio Paradise	Tecmo	Tecmo	2007-04-05^{JP}	Yes		
Rakushou! Pachi-Slot Sengen 6: Rio 2 Cruising Vanadis	Tecmo	Tecmo	2009-05-14^{JP}	Yes		
Rally Championship	Warthog Games	SCi Games^{EU}, Success^{JP}	2002-05-31^{EU}	Yes	Yes	
Rally Fusion: Race of Champions	Climax Studios	Activision	2002-11-11^{NA}		Yes	Yes
Rampage: Total Destruction	Pipeworks Studios	Midway Games	2006-04-24^{NA}		Yes	Yes
Ramune: Garasu-Bin ni Uturu Umi	Neko Neko Soft	Interchannel	2005-08-25^{JP}	Yes		
RA.ONE The Game	Trine Games	Sony Computer Entertainment	2011-10-05^{IN}		Yes ^{IN}	
Rapala Pro Bass Fishing	Fun Labs	Activision	2010-09-28^{NA}			Yes
Rapala Pro Fishing	Activision	Activision^{NA}, Zoo Digital Publishing^{EU}	2004-08-31^{NA}		Yes	Yes
Rasetsu Alternative	Nippon Ichi Software	Kogado Studio	2005-10-13^{JP}	Yes		
Ratchet & Clank	Insomniac Games	Sony Computer Entertainment	2002-11-04^{NA}	Yes ^{AS, JP}	Yes	Yes
Ratchet & Clank: Going Commando •Ratchet & Clank 2^{JP} •Ratchet & Clank 2: Locked and Loaded^{PAL}	Insomniac Games	Sony Computer Entertainment	2003-11-11^{NA}	Yes ^{JP, KO}	Yes	Yes
Ratchet & Clank: Size Matters •Ratchet & Clank 5: Gekitotsu! Dodeka Ginga no Mirimiri Gundan^{JP}	High Impact Games	Sony Computer Entertainment	2008-03-11^{NA}	Yes ^{JP, KO}	Yes	Yes
Ratchet & Clank: Up Your Arsenal •Ratchet & Clank 3^{EU} •Ratchet & Clank 3 Totsugeki! Galactic Rangers^{JP} •Ratchet & Clank 3: Up Your Arsenal^{AS, AU}	Insomniac Games	Sony Computer Entertainment	2004-11-03^{NA}	Yes ^{AS, JP, KO}	Yes	Yes
Ratchet: Deadlocked •Ratchet & Clank 4th: GiriGiri Ginga no Giga Battle^{AS, JP} •Ratchet: Gladiator^{PAL}	Insomniac Games	Sony Computer Entertainment	2005-10-25^{NA}	Yes ^{AS, JP, KO}	Yes	Yes
Raw Danger! •Zettaizetsumei Toshi 2: Itetsuita Kiokutachi^{JP}	Irem	Irem^{JP}, Agetec^{EU, NA}	2006-03-30^{JP}	Yes	Yes	Yes
Rayman 2: Revolution •Rayman Revolution^{EU, JP}	Ubisoft	Ubisoft	2000-12-22^{EU}	Yes	Yes	Yes
Rayman 3: Hoodlum Havoc	Ubisoft	Ubisoft	2003-03-14^{EU}	Yes ^{KO}	Yes	Yes
Rayman Arena •Rayman M^{EU}	Ubisoft	Ubisoft	2001-11-30^{EU}		Yes	Yes
Rayman Raving Rabbids	Ubisoft	Ubisoft	2006-12-05^{NA}		Yes	Yes
RC Revenge Pro	Acclaim Studios Cheltenham	Acclaim Entertainment	2000-12-01^{PAL}	Yes	Yes	Yes
RC Sports: Copter Challenge •Flying Circus^{JP}	Syscom	Syscom^{JP}, Xicat Interactive^{EU}	2001-11-15^{JP}	Yes	Yes	
RC Toy Machines	Mere Mortals	Phoenix Games	2004-11-05^{EU}		Yes	
Ready 2 Rumble Boxing: Round 2	Midway Games	Midway Games	2000-10-23^{NA}	Yes	Yes	Yes
Real Madrid: The Game	Atomic Planet Entertainment	Virgin Play	2009-05^{EU}		Yes	
Real Pool •EX Billiards^{JP} •International Cue Club^{EU}	Astroll	Takara^{JP}, Infogrames^{NA}, Midas Interactive Entertainment^{EU}	2000-09-07^{JP}	Yes	Yes	Yes
Real Robot Regiment	Wavedge	Banpresto	2001-08-09^{JP}	Yes		
Real Rode	HuneX	Kadokawa Games	2008-12-04^{JP}	Yes		
Real Sports Pro Yakyū	Enterbrain	Enterbrain	2003-08-07^{JP}	Yes		
Real World Golf	In2Games	Valcon Games^{EU}, Mad Catz^{NA}	2005-08-26^{EU}		Yes	Yes
Real World Golf 2007	In2Games	In2Games	2006-08-25^{EU}		Yes	
Realize: Panorama Luminary	Visual Arts	Interchannel	2005-09-15^{JP}	Yes		
Realm of the Dead •Bakuen Kakusei: Neverland Senki Zero^{JP}	Neverland	Idea Factory^{JP}, Midas Interactive Entertainment^{EU}	2004-07-22^{JP}	Yes	Yes	
RealPlay Golf	In2Games	In2Games	2007-11-30^{EU}		Yes	
RealPlay Pool	In2Games	In2Games	2007-11-30^{EU}		Yes	
RealPlay Puzzlesphere	In2Games	In2Games	2007-11-30^{EU}		Yes	
RealPlay Racing	In2Games	In2Games	2007-11-30^{EU}		Yes	
Rebel Raiders: Operation Nighthawk	Kando Games	Nobilis^{EU}, XS Games^{NA}	2006-03-03^{EU}		Yes	Yes
Rebirth Moon	Idea Factory	Idea Factory	2005-11-24^{JP}	Yes		
REC * DokiDoki Seiyū Paradise	Idea Factory	Idea Factory	2006-11-30^{JP}	Yes		
Red Baron	Atomic Planet Entertainment	Davilex	2005-11-25^{EU}		Yes	
Red Dead Revolver	Rockstar San Diego	Rockstar Games^{NA}, Take-Two Interactive^{EU}, Capcom^{JP}	2004-05-03^{NA}	Yes	Yes	Yes
Red Faction	Volition	THQ	2001-05-22^{NA}		Yes	Yes
Red Faction II	Volition	THQ	2002-10-15^{NA}		Yes	Yes
Red Ninja: End of Honor •Red Ninja: End of Honour^{EU} •Red Ninja: Kekka no Mai^{JP}	Tranji Studios	Vivendi Universal Games	2005-03-03^{JP}	Yes	Yes	Yes
The Red Star	Acclaim Studios Austin	XS Games	2007-04-20^{PAL}		Yes	Yes
RedCard 20-03 •RedCard^{EU, JP}	Point of View	Midway Games	2002-04-16^{NA}	Yes	Yes	Yes
Reel Fishing III •Fish Eyes 3^{JP}	Victor Interactive	Victor Interactive^{JP}, Ubisoft^{EU}, Natsume Inc.^{NA}	2003-06-26^{JP}	Yes	Yes	Yes
Reign of Fire	Kuju Entertainment	BAM! Entertainment	2002-10-22^{NA}	Yes ^{KO}	Yes	Yes
Reijou Tantei: Office Love Jikenbo •Simple 2000 Series Vol. 123: The Office Love Jikenbou – Reijou Tantei^{JP}	Tomcat System	D3 Publisher	2007-02-22^{JP}	Yes		
Relaxuma: Ojama Shitemasu 2 Shūkan	San-X	Interchannel	2005-09-01^{JP}	Yes		
Remember 11: The Age of Infinity	KID	KID	2004-03-18^{JP}	Yes		
Remote Control Dandy SF	Konami	Konami	2005-04-14^{JP}	Yes		
The Renai Adventure 2: Jo no Ko no Tameno •Simple 2000 Series Vol. 13: The Renai Adventure 2 – Jo no Ko no Tameno^{JP}	HuneX	D3 Publisher	2002-10-24^{JP}	Yes		
The Renai Adventure: Bittersweet Fools •Simple 2000 Series Vol. 9: The Renai Adventure – Bittersweet Fools^{JP}	HuneX	D3 Publisher	2002-09-12^{JP}	Yes		
The Renai Board •Simple 2000 Series Vol. 29: The Renai Board – Seishun 18 Radio^{JP}	Billiken Soft	D3 Publisher	2003-05-29^{JP}	Yes		
The Renai Horror Adventure •Simple 2000 Series Vol. 34: The Renai Horror Adventure – Hyouryū Shoujo^{JP}	Siesta	D3 Publisher	2003-07-24^{JP}	Yes		
The Renai Simulation: Renai Kissa Watashi ni Oma Cafe •Simple 2000 Series Vol. 19: The Renai Simulation – Renai Kissa Watashi ni Oma Cafe^{JP}	Vingt-et-un Systems	D3 Publisher	2002-12-19^{JP}	Yes		
Reservoir Dogs	Volatile Games	Eidos Interactive	2006-08-25^{EU}		Yes	Yes
Resident Evil 4 •Biohazard 4^{JP}	Capcom	Capcom	2005-10-25^{NA}	Yes ^{JP, KO}	Yes	Yes
Resident Evil Code: Veronica X •Biohazard Code: Veronica Kanzenban^{JP}	Capcom	Capcom	2001-03-22^{JP}	Yes	Yes	Yes
Resident Evil: Dead Aim •Gun Survivor 4: Biohazard – Heroes Never Die^{JP}	Cavia	Capcom	2003-02-13^{JP}	Yes	Yes	Yes
Resident Evil Outbreak •Biohazard Outbreak^{JP}	Capcom	Capcom	2003-12-11^{JP}	Yes	Yes	Yes
Resident Evil Outbreak File #2 •Biohazard Outbreak File #2^{JP}	Capcom	Capcom	2004-09-09^{JP}	Yes	Yes	Yes
Resident Evil Survivor 2 Code: Veronica •Gun Survivor 2: Biohazard – Code: Veronica^{JP}	Capcom	Capcom	2001-11-08^{JP}	Yes	Yes	
Retro	Aqua Pacific	Phoenix Games	2006^{EU}		Yes	
Return to Castle Wolfenstein: Operation Resurrection	Raster Productions	Activision	2003-05-30^{NA}		Yes	Yes
Reveal Fantasia	Infinity Co., Ltd.	Victor Interactive Software	2002-03-20^{JP}	Yes		
Rez	United Game Artists	Sega^{JP, NA}, Sony Computer Entertainment^{EU}	2001-11-22^{JP}	Yes	Yes	Yes
Rhythmic Star!	Suzak Inc.	Ignition Entertainment	2006-04-07^{EU}		Yes	
Ribbit King •Kero Kero King Super DX^{JP}	Infinity Co., Ltd.	Bandai^{JP, NA}, Atari^{EU}	2003-12-18^{JP}	Yes	Yes	Yes
Richard Burns Rally	Warthog Games	SCi	2004-07-09^{EU}	Yes	Yes	
Ridge Racer V	Namco	Namco^{JP, NA}, Sony Computer Entertainment^{EU}	2000-03-04^{JP}	Yes	Yes	Yes
Riding Spirits •RS: Riding Spirits^{JP}	Spike	Spike^{JP}, BAM! Entertainment^{EU, NA}	2002-07-25^{JP}	Yes	Yes	Yes
Riding Spirits II	Spike	Spike^{JP}, Capcom^{EU}	2004-02-26^{JP}	Yes	Yes	
Riding Star •Tim Stockdale's Riding Star^{EU}	Valcon Games	SVG Distribution^{NA}, Eidos Interactive^{EU}	2008-04-29^{NA}		Yes	Yes
Rig Racer 2	Data Design Interactive	Metro3D	2005-07-12^{EU}		Yes	
Rim Runners	Fog Inc.	Fog Inc.	2005-01-27^{JP}	Yes		
Rimo-Cocoron	Sony Computer Entertainment	Sony Computer Entertainment	2001-06-28^{JP}	Yes		
Ring of Red	Konami	Konami	2000-09-21^{JP}	Yes	Yes	Yes
Ripple no Tamago: Apprentice Magician •Simple 2000 Series Vol. 74: The Oujisama to Romance – Ripple no Tamago^{JP}	HuneX	D3 Publisher	2003-06-12^{JP}	Yes		
Rise of the Kasai	BottleRocket Entertainment	Sony Computer Entertainment	2005-04-05^{NA}			Yes
Rise to Honor	Sony Computer Entertainment	Sony Computer Entertainment	2004-02-17^{NA}		Yes	Yes
Risk: Global Domination	Cyberlore Studios	Atari	2003-11-05^{NA}		Yes	Yes
River King: A Wonderful Journey •Harvest Fishing^{EU} •Kawa no Nushi Tsuri: Wonderful Journey^{JP}	Marvelous Entertainment	Marvelous Entertainment^{JP}, 505 Game Street^{EU}, Natsume Inc.^{NA}	2005-01-27^{JP}	Yes	Yes	Yes
RLH: Run Like Hell	Digital Mayhem	Interplay Entertainment^{NA}, Avalon Interactive^{EU}, Capcom^{JP}	2002-09-27^{NA}	Yes	Yes	Yes
Road Rage 3 •Touge 3^{JP}	Atlus	Atlus^{JP}, Phoenix Games^{EU}	2001-10-11^{JP}	Yes	Yes	
Road Trip •Road Trip Adventure^{PAL} •Choro Q HG 2^{JP, KO}	E-Game Inc.	Takara^{JP, KO}, Conspiracy Entertainment^{NA}, Play It!^{PAL}	2002-01-10^{JP}	Yes ^{JP, KO}	Yes	Yes
RoadKill	Terminal Reality	Midway Games	2003-10-13^{NA}		Yes	Yes
Robin Hood: Defender of the Crown	Cinemaware	Capcom	2003-09-30^{NA}		Yes	Yes
Robin Hood: The Siege 2	Mere Mortals	Phoenix Games	2006-10-06^{EU}		Yes	
Robin Hood's Quest	Broadsword Interactive	Oxygen Games	2007-02-16^{EU}		Yes	
RoboCop	Titus Software	Titus Software^{JP}, Avalon Interactive^{EU}	2003-07-03^{JP}	Yes	Yes	
Robot Alchemic Drive •Gigantic Drive^{JP}	Sandlot	Enix	2002-08-29^{JP}	Yes		Yes
The Robot Tsuku Rouze! – Gekitou! Robot Fight •Simple 2000 Series Vol. 104: The Robot Tsuku Rouze! – Gekitou! Robot Fight^{JP}	HuneX	D3 Publisher	2006-08-10^{JP}	Yes		
Robot Warlords •Velvet File^{JP}	Dazz	Dazz^{JP}, Midas Interactive Entertainment^{EU}	2000-08-10^{JP}	Yes	Yes	
Robot Wars: Arenas of Destruction	Climax Studios	Gamezlab	2002-11-01^{EU}		Yes	
Robotech: Battlecry	Vicious Cycle Software	TDK Mediactive	2002-09-25^{NA}	Yes ^{KO}	Yes	Yes
Robotech: Invasion	Vicious Cycle Software	Global Star Software	2004-10-05^{NA}		Yes	Yes
Robots	Eurocom	Vivendi Universal Games	2005-02-24^{NA}	Yes	Yes	Yes
Rock Band	Pi Studios	MTV Games	2007-12-18^{NA}		Yes	Yes
Rock Band 2	Pi Studios	MTV Games^{NA}, Electronic Arts^{EU}	2008-12-18^{NA}		Yes	Yes
Rock Band Country Track Pack (Note: stand-alone expansion for Rock Band.)	Harmonix Music Systems	MTV Games	2009-07-21^{NA}			Yes
Rock Band Metal Track Pack (Note: stand-alone expansion for Rock Band.)	Harmonix Music Systems	MTV Games	2009-09-22^{NA}			Yes
Rock Band Track Pack: Classic Rock (Note: stand-alone expansion for Rock Band.)	Harmonix Music Systems	MTV Games	2009-05-19^{NA}			Yes
Rock Band Track Pack Volume 1 •Rock Band Song Pack 1^{EU} (Note: stand-alone expansion for Rock Band.)	Harmonix Music Systems	MTV Games	2008-07-15^{NA}		Yes	Yes
Rock Band Track Pack Volume 2 •Rock Band Song Pack 2^{EU} (Note: stand-alone expansion for Rock Band.)	Harmonix Music Systems	MTV Games	2008-11-17^{NA}		Yes	Yes
Rock 'n' Roll Adventures	Data Design Interactive	Data Design Interactive	2006-01-20^{EU}		Yes	
Rocket Power: Beach Bandits	Evolution Games	THQ	2002-09-20^{NA}		Yes	Yes
Rockman: Power Battle Fighters	Capcom	Capcom	2004-08-05^{JP}	Yes		
Rock'n Megastage	Jaleco	Jaleco	2000-06-22^{JP}	Yes		
Rocky	Rage Software	Rage Software^{EU}, Ubisoft^{NA}, Success^{JP}	2002-11-15^{EU}	Yes	Yes	Yes
Rocky: Legends	Venom Games	Ubisoft	2004-09-28^{NA}		Yes	Yes
Rogue Galaxy	Level-5	Sony Computer Entertainment	2005-12-08^{JP}	Yes ^{JP, KO}	Yes	Yes
Rogue Hearts Dungeon	Compile Heart	Compile Heart	2007-04-26^{JP}	Yes		
Rogue Ops	Bits Studios	Kemco	2003-10-29^{NA}	Yes	Yes	Yes
Rogue Trooper	Rebellion Developments	Eidos Interactive	2006-04-21^{EU}		Yes	Yes
Roland Garros 2005: Powered by Smash Court Tennis	Namco	Sony Computer Entertainment	2005-05-18^{EU}		Yes	
Roller Coaster Funfare	Phoenix Games	Phoenix Games	2007-10-12^{EU}		Yes	
Rollercoaster World •Simple 2000 Series Vol. 33: The Jet Coaster – Yūenchi Otsukurou!^{JP}	Bimboosoft	D3 Publisher^{JP}, Midas Interactive Entertainment^{EU}	2003-07-24^{JP}	Yes	Yes	
Rolling	Rage Software	Rage Software	2003-10-24^{EU}		Yes	
Romance of the Three Kingdoms IX •San Goku Shi IX^{JP} •San Goku Shi IX with Power-Up Kit^{JP} (different version)	Koei	Koei	2003-12-20^{JP}	Yes		Yes
Romance of the Three Kingdoms VII •San Goku Shi VII^{JP}	Koei	Koei	2000-08-31^{JP}	Yes		Yes
Romance of the Three Kingdoms VIII •San Goku Shi VIII^{JP} •San Goku Shi VIII with Power-Up Kit^{JP} (different version)	Koei	Koei	2002-01-24^{JP}	Yes	Yes	Yes
Romance of the Three Kingdoms X •San Goku Shi X^{JP}	Koei	Koei	2005-03-10^{JP}	Yes		Yes
Romance of the Three Kingdoms XI •San Goku Shi XI^{JP} •San Goku Shi XI with Power-Up Kit^{JP} (different version)	Koei	Koei	2006-09-28^{JP}	Yes		Yes
Romancing SaGa •Romancing SaGa: Minstrel Song^{JP}	Square Enix	Square Enix	2005-04-21^{JP}	Yes		Yes
Room Zoom: Race for Impact	Blade Interactive	Jaleco	2005-03-25^{EU}		Yes	
Roommania #203	Sega	Sega	2002-07-25^{JP}	Yes		
Roommate Asami: Okusama wa Joshikousei	Datam Polystar	Datam Polystar	2002-06-20^{JP}	Yes		
The Roomshare to Iu Seikatsu •Simple 2000 Series Vol. 115: The Roomshare to Iu Seikatsu^{JP}	Datam Polystar	Datam Polystar	2007-03-29^{JP}	Yes		
Rosario to Vampire Capu 2: Koi to Yume no Rhapsodia	Compile Heart	Compile Heart	2009-07-23^{JP}	Yes		
Routes PE	Aquaplus	Aquaplus	2007-01-25^{JP}	Yes		
Rozen Maiden ~duellwalzer~	Taito	Taito	2006-04-27^{JP}	Yes		
Rozen Maiden ~gebetgarten~	Taito	Taito	2007-03-22^{JP}	Yes		
RPG Maker 3 •RPG Tsukuru^{JP}	Runtime	Enterbrain^{JP}, Agetec^{NA}	2004-12-16^{JP}	Yes		Yes
RPG Maker II •RPG Tsukuru 5^{JP}	Kūsou Kagaku	Enterbrain^{JP}, Agetec^{NA}	2002-08-08^{JP}	Yes		Yes
RPM Tuning	Babylon Software	Wanadoo Edition	2004-11-19^{EU}		Yes	
RS3: Racing Simulation Three	Ubisoft Paris	Ubisoft	2003-10-31^{EU}		Yes	
RTL Biathlon 2007	49Games	RTL	2006-12^{EU}		Yes	
RTL Biathlon 2009	49Games	RTL	2008-11-27^{EU}		Yes	
RTL Ski Jumping 2003	RTL	THQ	2003^{EU}		Yes	
RTL Ski Jumping 2004	RTL	RTL	2003-11-18^{EU}		Yes	
RTL Ski Jumping 2005	49Games	RTL	2004-12-10^{EU}		Yes	
RTL Ski Jumping 2006	49Games	RTL	2006^{EU}		Yes	
RTL Ski Jumping 2007	49Games	RTL	2006-11-17^{EU}		Yes	
RTL Winter Games 2007	49Games	RTL	2006-12-06^{EU}		Yes	
RTX Red Rock	LucasArts	LucasArts^{NA}, Activision^{EU}	2003-06-17^{NA}		Yes	Yes
R-Type Final	Irem	Irem^{JP, KO}, Eidos Interactive^{NA}, Metro3D^{EU}	2003-06-19^{KO}	Yes ^{JP, KO}	Yes	Yes
Ruff Trigger: The Vanocore Conspiracy	Playstos Entertainment	Natsume Inc.	2006-06-28^{NA}		Yes	Yes
Rugby	The Creative Assembly	Electronic Arts	2001-06-15^{EU}		Yes	Yes
The Rugby •Simple 2000 Series Vol. 15: The Rugby^{JP}	Siesta	D3 Publisher	2002-11-14^{JP}	Yes		
Rugby 06	HB Studios	Electronic Arts	2006-02-10^{EU}	Yes	Yes	Yes
Rugby 08	HB Studios	Electronic Arts	2007-07-17^{NA}	Yes	Yes	Yes
Rugby 2004	HB Studios	Electronic Arts	2003-09-16^{NA}		Yes	Yes
Rugby 2005	HB Studios	Electronic Arts	2005-03-08^{NA}		Yes	Yes
Rugby Challenge 2006	Swordfish Studios	Ubisoft	2006-02-03^{EU}		Yes	
Rugby League	Sidhe Interactive	Home Entertainment Suppliers	2003-12-09^{AU}		Yes	
Rugby League 2 World Cup Edition (Note: update for Rugby League 2.)	Sidhe Interactive	Home Entertainment Suppliers	2008-11-06^{AU}		Yes	
Rugrats: Royal Ransom	Avalanche Studios	THQ	2002-11-16^{NA}		Yes	Yes
Rule of Rose	Punchline	Sony Computer Entertainment^{JP}, Atlus^{NA}, 505 Game Street^{EU}	2006-01-19^{JP}	Yes	Yes	Yes
The Rumble Fish	Dimps	Sega	2005-03-17^{JP}	Yes		
Rumble Racing	Electronic Arts	Electronic Arts	2001-04-23^{NA}		Yes	Yes
Rumble Roses	Yuke's	Konami	2004-11-09^{NA}	Yes ^{JP, KO}	Yes	Yes
Runabout 3 Neo Age •Simple 2000 Ultimate Series Vol. 9: Bakusou! Manhattan – Runabout 3^{JP}	Climax Entertainment	Hearty Robin^{JP}, BAM! Entertainment^{EU}, D3 Publisher^{JP}	2002-05-23^{JP}	Yes	Yes	
Rune Princess	PrincessSoft	PrincessSoft	2005-11-24^{JP}	Yes		
Rune: Viking Warlord	Human Head Studios	Gathering of Developers	2001-07-30^{NA}		Yes	Yes
Rurouni Kenshin: Meiji Kenkaku Romantan - Enjou! Kyoto Rinne	Eighting	Banpresto	2006-09-14^{JP}	Yes		
Rygar: The Legendary Adventure •Argus no Senshi^{JP}	Tecmo	Tecmo^{JP, NA}, Wanadoo Edition^{EU}	2002-11-25^{NA}	Yes	Yes	Yes
Ryu-Koku	KID	KID	2006-09-21^{JP}	Yes		
Sacred Blaze	Flight-Plan	Flight-Plan	2009-02-19^{JP}	Yes		
Sagashi ni Ikouyo	Sony Computer Entertainment	Sony Computer Entertainment	2001-01-11^{JP}	Yes		
The Saiban •Simple 2000 Series Vol. 43: The Saiban^{JP}	Tomcat System	D3 Publisher	2003-12-11^{JP}	Yes		
The Saigo no Nippon Tsuwamono •Simple 2000 Series Vol. 120: The Saigo no Nippon Tsuwamono^{JP}	Tamsoft	D3 Publisher	2007-08-30^{JP}	Yes		
Saikyo Shogi Gekisashi Special	NCS	NCS	2006-08-24^{JP}	Yes		
Saikyou Ginsei Shogi 4	Magnolia	Magnolia	2004-05-27^{JP}	Yes		
Saikyou no Igo 2	Unbalance	Unbalance	2002-04-25^{JP}	Yes		
Saikyou Toudai Shogi 2003	Mycom	Mycom	2003-05-29^{JP}	Yes		
Saikyou Toudai Shogi 2004	Mycom	Mycom	2004-01-08^{JP}	Yes		
Saikyou Toudai Shogi 3	Mycom	Mycom	2001-05-31^{JP}	Yes		
Saikyou Toudai Shogi 4	Mycom	Mycom	2002-06-13^{JP}	Yes		
Saikyou Toudai Shogi 5	Mycom	Mycom	2004-08-05^{JP}	Yes		
Saikyou Toudai Shogi 6	Mycom	Mycom	2006-12-14^{JP}	Yes		
Saikyou Toudai Shogi Special	Mycom	Mycom	2002-01-31^{JP}	Yes		
Saikyou Toudai Shogi Special II	Mycom	Mycom	2005-04-14^{JP}	Yes		
Saint and Sinner	Phoenix Games	Phoenix Games	2006-01-02^{EU}		Yes	
Saint Beast: Rasen no Shou	Marvelous Entertainment	Marvelous Entertainment	2007-09-20^{JP}	Yes		
Saint Seiya: The Hades •Seinto Seiya Meiō Hādesu Jūnikyū-hen^{JP}	Dimps	Bandai	2006-09-29^{EU}	Yes	Yes	
Saint Seiya: The Sanctuary •Seinto Seiya Sankuchuari Jūnikyū-hen^{JP}	Dimps	Bandai	2005-04-07^{JP}	Yes	Yes	
Saishū Densha	Visit	Visit	2002-04-25^{JP}	Yes		
Saishū Heiki Kanojo	Konami	Konami	2003-05-29^{JP}	Yes		
Saishū Shiken Kujira: Alive	Circus	Sweets	2007-09-27^{JP}	Yes		
Saiyuki Reload	Bandai	Bandai	2004-03-18^{JP}	Yes		
Saiyuki Reload: Gunlock	Bandai	Bandai	2004-08-05^{JP}	Yes		
The Saiyuki Saruden •Simple 2000 Series Vol. 73: The Saiyuki Saruden^{JP}	Tamsoft	D3 Publisher	2005-03-17^{JP}	Yes		
Sakigake!! Kuromati Koukou	DigiCube	DigiCube	2003-02-20^{JP}	Yes		
Sakigake!! Kuromati Koukou: Kore wa Hyottoshite Game Nanoka!? Hen	Hudson Soft	Hudson Soft	2004-03-04^{JP}	Yes		
Sakigake!! Otokojuku •Simple 2000 Ultimate Series Vol. 34: Sakigake!! Otokojuku^{JP}	D3 Publisher	D3 Publisher	2005-11-10^{JP}	Yes		
Sakura Taisen 3 ~Paris wa Moeteiru ka~	Sega	Sega	2005-02-24^{JP}	Yes		
Sakura Taisen: Atsuki Chishio Ni	Sega	Sega	2003-02-27^{JP}	Yes		
Sakura Taisen Monogatari: Mysterious Paris	Sega	Sega	2004-03-18^{JP}	Yes		
Sakura Taisen V Episode 0: Kouya no Samurai Musume	Sega	Sega	2004-09-22^{JP}	Yes ^{AS, JP}		
Sakura Wars: So Long, My Love •Sakura Taisen V: Saraba Itoshiki Hito Yo^{JP}	Sega	Sega	2005-07-07^{JP}	Yes		Yes
Sakura: Yuki Gekka	Circus	PrincessSoft	2003-07-31^{JP}	Yes		
Sakurazaka Shouboutai	Racjin	Irem	2004-06-10^{JP}	Yes		
Salt Lake 2002	Attention to Detail	Eidos Interactive	2002-01-18^{EU}	Yes	Yes	Yes
Samurai 7	Design Factory	Idea Factory	2006-05-25^{JP}	Yes		
Samurai Aces •Psikyo Shooting Collection Vol. 2: Sengoku Ace + Sengoku Blade^{JP}	Psikyo	Taito^{JP}, 505 Game Street^{EU}	2004-12-02^{JP}	Yes	Yes	
Samurai Champloo: Sidetracked •Samurai Champloo^{JP, KO}	Grasshopper Manufacture	Namco Bandai Games	2006-02-23^{JP}	Yes ^{JP, KO}		Yes
Samurai Jack: The Shadow of Aku	Adrenium Games	Sega	2004-03-24^{NA}		Yes	Yes
Samurai Shodown Anthology •Samurai Spirits: Rokuban Shoubu^{JP}	SNK Playmore	SNK Playmore^{JP, NA}, Ignition Entertainment^{EU}	2008-07-24^{JP}	Yes	Yes	Yes
Samurai Shodown V •Samurai Spirits Zero^{JP}	Yuki	SNK Playmore^{JP, NA}, Ignition Entertainment^{EU}	2004-07-29^{JP}	Yes	Yes	
Samurai Spirits: Tenkaichi Kenkakuden	SNK Playmore	SNK Playmore	2006-01-26^{JP}	Yes		
Samurai Warriors •Sengoku Musou^{JP}	Omega Force	Koei^{JP, NA}, Electronic Arts^{EU}	2004-02-11^{JP}	Yes	Yes	Yes
Samurai Warriors 2 •Sengoku Musou 2^{JP}	Omega Force	Koei	2006-02-24^{JP}	Yes	Yes	Yes
Samurai Warriors 2: Empires •Sengoku Musou 2: Empires^{JP} (Note: stand-alone expansion for Samurai Warriors 2.)	Omega Force	Koei	2006-11-16^{JP}	Yes	Yes	Yes
Samurai Warriors 2: Xtreme Legends •Sengoku Musou 2: Moushouden^{JP} (Note: stand-alone expansion for Samurai Warriors 2.)	Omega Force	Koei	2007-08-23^{JP}	Yes	Yes	Yes
Samurai Warriors: Xtreme Legends •Sengoku Musou: Moushouden^{JP} (Note: stand-alone expansion for Samurai Warriors.)	Omega Force	Koei	2004-09-16^{JP}	Yes	Yes	Yes
Samurai Western •Samurai Western: Katsugeki Samurai-dou^{JP}	Acquire	Spike^{JP}, Atlus^{NA}, 505 Game Street^{EU}	2005-01-01^{JP}	Yes	Yes	Yes
Sangoku Rensenki: Otome no Heihou!	Prototype	Prototype	2011-06-16^{JP}	Yes		
Sanyo Pachinko Paradise 10	Irem	Irem	2004-05-27^{JP}	Yes		
Sanyo Pachinko Paradise 11	Irem	Irem	2005-02-24^{JP}	Yes		
Sanyo Pachinko Paradise 6	Irem	Irem	2001-06-28^{JP}	Yes		
Sanyo Pachinko Paradise 7	Irem	Irem	2002-06-27^{JP}	Yes		
Sanyo Pachinko Paradise 8	Irem	Irem	2003-03-27^{JP}	Yes		
Sanyo Pachinko Paradise 9	Irem	Irem	2003-11-06^{JP}	Yes		
Saru! Get You! Million Monkeys	Sony Computer Entertainment	Sony Computer Entertainment	2006-07-13^{JP}	Yes ^{AS, JP}		
SAS: Anti Terror Force (GSG9 Anti-Terror Force in Germany)	Atomic Planet Entertainment	Davilex	2005-11-04^{EU}		Yes	
Saturday Night Speedway •Stock Car Speedway^{EU}	Ratbag Games	Atari^{NA}, Play It!^{EU}	2004-03-11^{NA}		Yes	Yes
Savage Skies	iRock Interactive	BAM! Entertainment^{NA}, Success^{JP}, Bigben Interactive^{EU}	2002-03-31^{NA}	Yes	Yes	Yes
SBK Superbike World Championship	Milestone srl	Black Bean Games^{PAL}, Conspiracy Entertainment^{NA}	2008-06-26^{AU}		Yes	Yes
SBK-09 Superbike World Championship	Milestone srl	Black Bean Games	2009-05-29^{EU}		Yes	
Scaler	Artificial Mind and Movement	Take-Two Interactive^{EU}, Global Star Software^{NA}	2004-10-01^{EU}		Yes	Yes
Scandal	Sugar and Rockets	Sony Computer Entertainment	2000-06-29^{JP}	Yes		
Scared Rider Xechs	Red Entertainment	Red Entertainment	2010-07-01^{JP}	Yes		
Scared Rider Xechs: Stardust Lovers (Note: stand-alone expansion for Scared Rider Xechs.)	Red Entertainment	Red Entertainment	2011-06-23^{JP}	Yes		
Scarface: The World Is Yours	Radical Entertainment	Vivendi Universal Games	2006-10-08^{NA}		Yes	Yes
Scarlett: Nichijou no Kyoukaisen	Kadokawa Games	Kadokawa Games	2008-10-30^{JP}	Yes		
School Days LxH	Interchannel	Interchannel	2008-01-17^{JP}	Yes		
School Love!	Views	Views	2006-12-21^{JP}	Yes		
School Rumble	Marvelous Entertainment	Marvelous Entertainment	2005-07-21^{JP}	Yes		
School Rumble Ni-Gakki	Marvelous Entertainment	Marvelous Entertainment	2006-07-20^{JP}	Yes		
Scooby-Doo! and the Spooky Swamp	Torus Games	Warner Bros. Interactive	2010-09-14^{NA}		Yes	Yes
Scooby-Doo! First Frights	Torus Games	Warner Bros. Interactive	2009-09-22^{NA}		Yes	Yes
Scooby-Doo! Mystery Mayhem	Artificial Mind and Movement	THQ	2004-03-02^{NA}		Yes	Yes
Scooby-Doo! Night of 100 Frights	Heavy Iron Studios	THQ	2002-05-20^{NA}		Yes	Yes
Scooby-Doo! Unmasked	Artificial Mind and Movement	THQ	2005-09-12^{NA}		Yes	Yes
SCORE International Baja 1000	Left Field Productions	Activision	2008-10-28^{NA}		Yes	Yes
The Scorpion King: Rise of the Akkadian	Point of View	Universal Interactive	2002-09-11^{NA}		Yes	Yes
Scrabble 2003 •Scrabble Interactive^{EU}	Runecraft	Ubisoft	2003-11-21^{EU}		Yes	
SD Gundam Force: Showdown!	Tom Create	Bandai	2004-10-11^{NA}	Yes		Yes
SD Gundam G Generation Neo	Tom Create	Bandai	2002-11-28^{JP}	Yes		
SD Gundam G Generation Seed	Tom Create	Bandai	2004-02-19^{JP}	Yes		
SD Gundam G Generation Spirits	Tom Create	Bandai	2007-11-29^{JP}	Yes ^{JP, KO}		
SD Gundam G Generation Wars	Tom Create	Bandai	2009-08-06^{JP}	Yes		
Sea Monsters: A Prehistoric Adventure	DSI Games	Zoo Digital Publishing	2008-02-04^{NA}		Yes	Yes
Sea World: Shamu's Deep Sea Adventures	Sand Grain Studios	Activision	2005-11-01^{NA}		Yes	Yes
Seaman 2	Vivarium	Sega	2007-10-18^{JP}	Yes		
Seaman: Kanzenban (Note: update for Seaman: Kindan no Pet: Gaze Hakushi no Jikken Shima.)	Vivarium	D3 Publisher	2003-02-27^{JP}	Yes		
Seaman: Kindan no Pet: Gaze Hakushi no Jikken Shima	Vivarium	ASCII Entertainment	2001-11-15^{JP}	Yes		
Search & Destroy	Phoenix Games	Phoenix Games	2006-06^{EU}		Yes	
Second Sight	Free Radical Design	Codemasters	2004-09-03^{EU}		Yes	Yes
Secret Agent Clank	Sanzaru Games	Sony Computer Entertainment	2009-05-26^{NA}		Yes	Yes
Secret Game: Killer Queen	Regista	Yeti	2008-08-21^{JP}	Yes		
Secret of Evangelion	Gainax	CyberFront	2006-12-21^{JP}	Yes		
The Secret Saturdays: Beasts of the 5th Sun	High Voltage Software	D3 Publisher	2009-10-20^{NA}		Yes	Yes
Secret Service	Tigon Studios	Activision	2008-11-04^{NA}		Yes	Yes
Secret Weapons Over Normandy	Totally Games	LucasArts^{EU, NA}, Electronic Arts^{JP}	2003-11-18^{NA}	Yes	Yes	Yes
The Seed: WarZone	Artdink	Artdink^{JP}, Midas Interactive Entertainment^{EU}	2001-12-06^{JP}	Yes	Yes	
Seek and Destroy •Shin Combat Choro Q^{JP, KO}	Barnhouse Effect	Takara^{JP}, Conspiracy Entertainment^{NA}, Play It!^{EU}	2002-06-27^{JP}	Yes ^{JP, KO}	Yes	Yes
Sega Ages 2500 Series Vol. 1: Phantasy Star Generation: 1	Sega	Sega	2003-08-28^{JP}	Yes		
Sega Ages 2500 Series Vol. 10: After Burner II	Sega	Sega	2004-03-18^{JP}	Yes		
Sega Ages 2500 Series Vol. 11: Hokuto no Ken	Sega	Sega	2004-03-25^{JP}	Yes		
Sega Ages 2500 Series Vol. 12: Puyo Puyo Tsū Perfect Set	Sega	Sega	2004-05-24^{JP}	Yes		
Sega Ages 2500 Series Vol. 13: OutRun	Sega	Sega	2004-05-27^{JP}	Yes		
Sega Ages 2500 Series Vol. 14: Alien Syndrome	Sega	Sega	2004-07-29^{JP}	Yes		
Sega Ages 2500 Series Vol. 15: Decathlete Collection	Sega	Sega	2004-07-29^{JP}	Yes		
Sega Ages 2500 Series Vol. 16: Virtua Fighter 2	Sega	Sega	2004-10-14^{JP}	Yes		
Sega Ages 2500 Series Vol. 17: Phantasy Star Generation: 2	Sega	Sega	2005-03-24^{JP}	Yes		
Sega Ages 2500 Series Vol. 18: Dragon Force	Sega	Sega	2005-08-18^{JP}	Yes		
Sega Ages 2500 Series Vol. 19: Fighting Vipers	Sega	Sega	2005-08-28^{JP}	Yes		
Sega Ages 2500 Series Vol. 2: Monaco GP	Sega	Sega	2003-08-28^{JP}	Yes		
Sega Ages 2500 Series Vol. 20: Space Harrier Complete Collection	Sega	Sega	2005-10-27^{JP}	Yes		
Sega Ages 2500 Series Vol. 21: SDI & Quartet – Sega System 16 Collection	Sega	Sega	2005-10-27^{JP}	Yes		
Sega Ages 2500 Series Vol. 22: Advanced Daisenryaku: Deutsch Dengeki Sakusen	Sega	Sega	2006-02-23^{JP}	Yes		
Sega Ages 2500 Series Vol. 23: Sega Memorial Selection	Sega	Sega	2006-12-22^{JP}	Yes		
Sega Ages 2500 Series Vol. 24: Last Bronx: Tokyo Bangaichi	Sega	Sega	2006-12-29^{JP}	Yes		
Sega Ages 2500 Series Vol. 25: Gunstar Heroes Treasure Box	Sega	Sega	2007-02-23^{JP}	Yes		
Sega Ages 2500 Series Vol. 26: Dynamite Deka	Sega	Sega	2007-04-27^{JP}	Yes		
Sega Ages 2500 Series Vol. 27: Panzer Dragoon	Sega	Sega	2007-04-27^{JP}	Yes		
Sega Ages 2500 Series Vol. 28: Tetris Collection	Sega	Sega	2007-06-28^{JP}	Yes		
Sega Ages 2500 Series Vol. 29: Monster World	Sega	Sega	2007-08-03^{JP}	Yes		
Sega Ages 2500 Series Vol. 3: Fantasy Zone	Sega	Sega	2003-08-28^{JP}	Yes		
Sega Ages 2500 Series Vol. 30: Galaxy Force II – Special Extended Edition	Sega	Sega	2007-08-26^{JP}	Yes		
Sega Ages 2500 Series Vol. 31: Dennou Senki Virtual On	Sega	Sega	2007-10-25^{JP}	Yes		
Sega Ages 2500 Series Vol. 32: Phantasy Star Complete Collection	Sega	Sega	2008-03-27^{JP}	Yes		
Sega Ages 2500 Series Vol. 33: Fantasy Zone Complete Collection	Sega	Sega	2008-09-11^{JP}	Yes		
Sega Ages 2500 Series Vol. 4: Space Harrier	Sega	Sega	2003-09-25^{JP}	Yes		
Sega Ages 2500 Series Vol. 5: Golden Axe	Sega	Sega	2003-09-25^{JP}	Yes		
Sega Ages 2500 Series Vol. 6: Ichini no Tant-R to Bonanza Bros.	Sega	Sega	2004-01-15^{JP}	Yes		
Sega Ages 2500 Series Vol. 7: Columns	Sega	Sega	2004-01-25^{JP}	Yes		
Sega Ages 2500 Series Vol. 8: Virtua Racing -FlatOut-	Sega	Sega	2004-02-26^{JP}	Yes		
Sega Ages 2500 Series Vol. 9: Gain Ground	Sega	Sega	2004-02-26^{JP}	Yes		
Sega Bass Fishing Duel •Get Bass Battle^{JP}	Wow Entertainment	Sega^{JP, NA}, Acclaim Entertainment^{EU}	2002-09-23^{NA}	Yes	Yes	Yes
Sega Genesis Collection	Digital Eclipse	Sega	2006-11-07^{NA}		Yes	Yes
Sega Rally 2006	Sega	Sega	2006-01-12^{JP}	Yes		
Sega Soccer Slam	Black Box Games	Sega	2002-09-02^{NA}		Yes	Yes
Sega Sports Tennis •Virtua Tennis 2^{EU} •Power Smash 2^{JP}	Hitmaker	Sega	2002-07-31^{NA}	Yes	Yes	Yes
Sega Superstars	Sonic Team	Sega	2004-10-22^{EU}	Yes	Yes	Yes
Sega Superstars Tennis	Sumo Digital	Sega	2008-03-18^{NA}		Yes	Yes
Seigi no Mikata	Sony Computer Entertainment	Sony Computer Entertainment	2001-11-15^{JP}	Yes		
Seikai no Senki	Gainax	CyberFront	2005-04-21^{JP}	Yes		
The Sekai Meisaku Gekijou Quiz •Simple 2000 Series Vol. 85: The Sekai Meisaku Gekijou Quiz^{JP}	Warashi	D3 Publisher	2005-08-25^{JP}	Yes		
Sekai no Subete: Two of Us	Yeti	Yeti	2006-09-28^{JP}	Yes		
Sekai Saikyou Ginsei Igo 5	Magnolia	Magnolia	2004-06-10^{JP}	Yes		
Sekai Saikyou Ginsei Igo 6	Magnolia	Magnolia	2005-08-11^{JP}	Yes		
Sekai Saikyou Ginsei Igo Kouza	SilverStar	SilverStar	2009-11-19^{JP}	Yes		
Sekirei: Mirai Kara no Okurimono	Alchemist	Alchemist	2009-10-29^{JP}	Yes		
Sengoku Anthology	SNK Playmore	DHM Interactive	2009-09-01^{EU}		Yes	
Sengoku Basara 2	Capcom	Capcom	2006-07-27^{JP}	Yes		
Sengoku Basara 2 Eiyū Gaiden (Note: stand-alone expansion for Sengoku Basara 2.)	Capcom	Capcom	2007-11-29^{JP}	Yes		
Sengoku Basara X	Arc System Works	Capcom	2008-06-26^{JP}	Yes ^{JP, KO}		
Sengoku Hime 2 Honoo: Hyakubana, Senran Tatsukaze no Gotoku	SystemSoft Alpha	SystemSoft Alpha	2010-12-02^{JP}	Yes		
Sengoku Hime: Senran ni Mau Otometachi	Yeti	Yeti	2009-11-12^{JP}	Yes		
Sengoku Tenka Touitsu	SystemSoft Alpha	SystemSoft Alpha	2009-03-26^{JP}	Yes		
Sensible Soccer 2006	Kuju Entertainment	Codemasters	2006-06-09^{EU}		Yes	
Sentimental Prelude	Interchannel	Interchannel	2004-10-28^{JP}	Yes		
Sentou Kokka Kai: Legend	Opera House	Soliton	2007-06-21^{JP}	Yes		
Sentou Kokka Kai: New Operations	Kadokawa Games	Kadokawa Games	2005-03-31^{JP}	Yes		
Se-Pa 2001	Koei/Inis	Koei	2001-12-06^{JP}	Yes		
Separate Hearts	KID	KID	2006-02-23^{JP}	Yes		
Serious Sam: Next Encounter	Climax Solent	Global Star Software	2004-04-22^{NA}		Yes	Yes
Seven: Molmorth no Kiheitai	Namco	Namco	2000-12-21^{JP}	Yes		
Seven Samurai 20XX	Dimps	Sammy^{JP, NA, EU}, YBM Sisa^{KO}	2004-01-08^{JP}	Yes ^{JP, KO}	Yes	Yes
Shadow Hearts: Covenant •Shadow Hearts II^{JP} •Shadow Hearts II: Director's Cut^{JP} (different version)	Nautilus	Aruze^{JP}, Midway Games^{NA, PAL}	2004-02-19^{JP}	Yes	Yes	Yes
Shadow Hearts: From The New World	Nautilus	Aruze^{JP}, XSEED Games^{NA}, Ghostlight^{PAL}	2005-07-28^{JP}	Yes	Yes	Yes
Shadow Hearts (video game)	Sacnoth	Aruze^{JP}, Midway Games^{EU, NA}	2001-06-28^{JP}	Yes	Yes	Yes
Shadow Man: 2econd Coming	Acclaim Studios Teesside	Acclaim Entertainment	2002-02-28^{NA}		Yes	Yes
Shadow of Destiny	Konami	Konami	2001-02-22^{JP}	Yes	Yes	Yes
Shadow of Ganymede	Mere Mortals	Phoenix Games	2005-06-24^{EU}		Yes	
Shadow of Rome	Capcom	Capcom	2005-02-04^{EU}	Yes	Yes	Yes
Shadow of the Colossus •Wander to Kyozou^{JP, KO}	Team Ico	Sony Computer Entertainment	2005-10-18^{NA}	Yes ^{JP, KO}	Yes	Yes
The Shadow of Zorro	In Utero	Cryo Interactive	2002-02-08^{EU}		Yes	
Shadow the Hedgehog	Sonic Team	Sega	2005-11-15^{NA}	Yes ^{JP, KO}	Yes	Yes
Shadow Tower: Abyss	FromSoftware	FromSoftware	2003-10-23^{JP}	Yes		
Shakugan no Shana	Vridge	ASCII Media Works	2006-03-23^{JP}	Yes		
Shaman King: Funbari Spirits	Dimps	Bandai	2004-04-08^{JP}	Yes		
Shaman King: Power of Spirit	WinkySoft	Konami	2004-11-09^{NA}		Yes	Yes
Shanghai: Four Elements	Sunsoft	Sunsoft	2000-09-28^{JP}	Yes		
Shanghai: Sangoku Pai Tatagi	Warashi	Sunsoft	2002-12-19^{JP}	Yes		
Shark Tale	Edge of Reality	Activision^{NA, PAL}, Taito^{JP}	2004-09-27^{NA}	Yes	Yes	Yes
Shaun Palmer's Pro Snowboarder	Dearsoft	Activision 02	2001-11-13^{NA}	Yes	Yes	Yes
Shaun White Snowboarding	Ubisoft	Ubisoft	2008-11-16^{NA}		Yes	Yes
Shellshock: Nam '67	Guerrilla Games	Eidos Interactive	2004-09-03^{EU}		Yes	Yes
Shepherd's Crossing •Youkoso Hitsuji-Mura^{JP}	Success	Success^{JP}, Valcon Games^{NA}	2003-12-25^{JP}	Yes		Yes
Shibai Michi	Sony Computer Entertainment	Sony Computer Entertainment	2003-02-13^{JP}	Yes		
The Shield: The Game	Point of View	Aspyr	2007-01-09^{NA}		Yes	Yes
Shifters	3DO	3DO	2002-04-26^{EU}		Yes	Yes
Shiju Hachi	Shannon	Banpresto	2007-11-22^{JP}	Yes		
Shijyou Saikyou no Deshi Kenichi: Gekitou! Ragnarok Hachikengou	Capcom	Capcom	2007-03-15^{JP}	Yes		
Shikaku Tantei: Sora no Sekai – Thousand Dreams	Nine'sFox	Nine'sFox	2007-09-13^{JP}	Yes		
Shikigami no Shiro: Nanayozuki Gensoukyoku	Alfa System	Kids Station	2005-08-18^{JP}	Yes		
Shin Bakusou Dekotora Densetsu	Spike	Jaleco	2005-02-10^{JP}	Yes		
Shin Best Play Pro Yakyū	ParityBit	Enterbrain	2003-09-25^{JP}	Yes		
Shin Gouketsuji Ichizoku: Bonnou Kaihou	Noise Factory	Excite	2006-05-25^{JP}	Yes		
Shin Hisui no Shizuku: Hiiro no Kakera 2	Idea Factory	Idea Factory	2009-10-01^{JP}	Yes		
Shin Koihime Musou: Otome Ryouran * Sangokushi Engi	Yeti	Yeti	2011-11-10^{JP}	Yes		
Shin Master of Monsters Final EX	SystemSoft	SystemSoft	2010-08-19^{JP}	Yes		
Shin Megami Tensei: Devil Summoner 2: Raidou Kuzunoha vs. King Abaddon •Devil Summoner: Kuzunoha Raidou tai Abaddon Ou^{JP}	Atlus	Atlus	2008-10-23^{JP}	Yes		Yes
Shin Megami Tensei: Devil Summoner: Raidou Kuzunoha vs. The Soulless Army •Devil Summoner: Kuzunoha Raidou tai Chouriki Heidan^{JP}	Atlus	Atlus^{JP, NA}, Koei^{PAL}	2006-03-02^{JP}	Yes	Yes	Yes
Shin Megami Tensei: Digital Devil Saga •Digital Devil Saga: Avatar Tuner^{JP}	Atlus	Atlus^{JP, NA}, Ghostlight^{PAL}	2004-07-15^{JP}	Yes	Yes	Yes
Shin Megami Tensei: Digital Devil Saga 2 •Digital Devil Saga: Avatar Tuner 2^{JP}	Atlus	Atlus^{JP, NA}, Ghostlight^{PAL}	2005-01-27^{JP}	Yes	Yes	Yes
Shin Megami Tensei: Nocturne •Shin Megami Tensei III: Nocturne^{JP} •Shin Megami Tensei: Lucifer's Call^{EU}	Atlus	Atlus^{JP, KO.NA}, Ghostlight^{EU}	2003-02-09^{KO}	Yes ^{JP, KO}	Yes	Yes
Shine: Kotoba o Tsumuide	Vridge	Success	2002-04-25^{JP}	Yes		
Shining Force EXA	Neverland	Sega	2007-01-18^{JP}	Yes		Yes
Shining Force Neo	Neverland	Sega	2005-03-24^{JP}	Yes		Yes
Shining Tears	Nex Entertainment	Sega	2004-11-03^{JP}	Yes		Yes
Shining Wind	Nex Entertainment	Sega	2007-05-17^{JP}	Yes ^{JP, KO}		
Shinjuku no Ōkami	Y'sK	Spike	2009-02-19^{JP}	Yes		
Shinki Gensou: Spectral Souls	Idea Factory	Idea Factory	2003-10-30^{JP}	Yes		
Shinki Gensou: Spectral Souls II	Idea Factory	Idea Factory	2005-01-27^{JP}	Yes		
Shinkon Gattai Godannar!!	Natsume Co., Ltd.	Bandai	2004-06-24^{JP}	Yes		
Shinobi	Overworks	Sega^{JP, KO, NA}, Sony Computer Entertainment^{EU}	2002-11-10^{NA}	Yes ^{JP, KO}	Yes	Yes
Shinobido Takumi (Note: stand-alone expansion for Shinobido: Way of the Ninja.)	Acquire	Spike	2006-03-30^{JP}	Yes		
Shinobido: Way of the Ninja •Shinobido Imashime^{JP, KO}	Acquire	Spike^{JP, KO}, Sony Computer Entertainment ^{EU}	2005-11-10^{JP}	Yes ^{JP, KO}	Yes	
Shinseiki Evangelion 2: Evangelions	Alfa System	Bandai	2003-11-20^{JP}	Yes ^{JP, KO}		
Shinseiki Evangelion: Ayanami Ikusei Keikaku with Asuka Hokan Keikaku	Gainax	Broccoli	2003-12-11^{JP}	Yes		
Shinseiki Evangelion: Battle Orchestra	Gainax	Broccoli	2007-06-28^{JP}	Yes		
Shinseiki Evangelion: Koutetsu no Girlfriend 2nd	Gainax	Broccoli	2005-01-20^{JP}	Yes		
Shinseiki Evangelion: Koutetsu no Girlfriend Special Edition	Gainax	CyberFront	2006-03-30^{JP}	Yes		
Shinseiki Evangelion: Typing E-Keikaku	Gainax	Artdink	2001-08-02^{JP}	Yes		
Shinseiki GPX Cyber Formula: Road to the Infinity	Atelier-Sai	Sunrise Interactive	2003-12-18^{JP}	Yes		
Shinseiki GPX Cyber Formula: Road to the Infinity 2	Sunrise Interactive	Sunrise Interactive	2005-08-11^{JP}	Yes		
Shinseiki GPX Cyber Formula: Road to the Infinity 3	Sunrise Interactive	Sunrise Interactive	2006-10-26^{JP}	Yes		
Shinseiki GPX Cyber Formula: Road to the Infinity 4	Sunrise Interactive	Sunrise Interactive	2007-10-04^{JP}	Yes		
Shinseiki Yūsha Taisen	Winkysoft	Atlus	2005-02-17^{JP}	Yes		
Shinten Makai: Generation of Chaos V	Neverland	Idea Factory	2005-07-21^{JP}	Yes		
Shirachū Tankenbu	Nex Entertainment	Taito	2003-08-28^{JP}	Yes		
Shirogane no Soleil: Contract to the Future – Mirai e no Keiyaku	Russel	Russel	2008-10-23^{JP}	Yes		
Shirogane no Torikago: The Angels with Strange Wings	Starfish SD	Starfish SD	2005-10-13^{JP}	Yes		
Shogi •SuperLite 2000 Table: Shogi^{JP}	Success	Success	2003-07-31^{JP}	Yes		
The Shogi •Simple 2000 Honkaku Shikou Series Vol. 1: The Shogi^{JP}	Yuki	D3 Publisher	2002-06-27^{JP}	Yes		
Shogi 4 •Value 2000 Series: Shogi 4^{JP}	Magnolia	Magnolia	2004-07-29^{JP}	Yes		
Shogi World Champion Gekihashi 2	Mycom	Mycom	2003-01-09^{JP}	Yes		
Shogun's Blade •Simple 2000 Series Vol. 47: The Kassen Gekigahara^{JP}	Tamsoft	D3 Publisher^{JP}, 505 Game Street^{EU}	2004-04-08^{JP}	Yes	Yes	
Shooting Love: Trizeal	Triangle Service	Datam Polystar	2006-04-20^{JP}	Yes		
Short Track Racing: Trading Paint	Big Ant Studios	THQ	2009-05-11^{NA}			Yes
Shoubi no Ki ni Shoubi no Hanasaku: Das Versprechen	Interchannel	Interchannel	2006-06-15^{JP}	Yes		
Shoujo Mahou Gaku Littlewitch Romanesque	Blackjack	Success	2007-02-22^{JP}	Yes		
Shoujo Yoshitsuneden	Vridge	Success	2003-09-18^{JP}	Yes		
Shoujo Yoshitsuneden 2	Vridge	Success	2005-06-09^{JP}	Yes		
Shoukan Shoujo: Elemental Girl Calling	Vridge	Kadokawa Games	2007-12-06^{JP}	Yes		
Shounen Onmyouji: Tsubasa Yoima, Ten e Kaere	Vridge	Kadokawa Games	2007-07-19^{JP}	Yes		
Showdown: Legends of Wrestling	Acclaim Studios Austin	Acclaim Entertainment	2004-06-22^{NA}	Yes ^{KO}	Yes	Yes
Shox •Rally Shox^{JP}	Electronic Arts	Electronic Arts	2002-09-27^{EU}	Yes	Yes	Yes
Shrek 2	Luxoflux	Activision^{NA, PAL}, D3 Publisher^{JP}	2004-04-28^{NA}	Yes	Yes	Yes
Shrek: Super Party	Mass Media Inc.	TDK Mediactive	2002-11-16^{NA}		Yes	Yes
Shrek's Carnival Craze	Ivolgamus	Activision	2008-10-28^{NA}		Yes	Yes
Shuffle! On the Stage	Navel	Kadokawa Games	2005-10-20^{JP}	Yes		
Shūmatsu Shoujo Gensou Alicematic Apocalypse	Caramel Box	Russel	2008-05-29^{JP}	Yes		
Sidewinder Max	Asmik Ace Entertainment	Asmik Ace Entertainment	2000-12-07^{JP}	Yes		
Silent Hill 2 •Silent Hill 2 Greatest Hits (different version) •Silent Hill 2: Director's Cut^{EU} (different version) •Silent Hill 2: Saigo no Uta^{JP} (different version)	KCET	Konami	2001-09-24^{NA}	Yes ^{JP, KO}	Yes	Yes
Silent Hill 3	KCET	Konami	2003-05-23^{EU}	Yes ^{JP, KO}	Yes	Yes
Silent Hill 4: The Room	KCET	Konami	2004-06-17^{JP}	Yes	Yes	Yes
Silent Hill: Origins	Climax Studios	Konami	2008-03-04^{NA}	Yes ^{KO}	Yes	Yes
Silent Hill: Shattered Memories	Climax Studios	Konami	2010-01-19^{NA}	Yes ^{JP, KO}	Yes	Yes
Silent Line: Armored Core •Armored Core 3: Silent Line^{JP} (Note: stand-alone expansion for Armored Core 3.)	FromSoftware	FromSoftware^{JP}, Agetec^{EU, NA}	2003-01-23^{JP}	Yes	Yes	Yes
Silent Scope	Konami	Konami	2000-10-23^{NA}	Yes	Yes	Yes
Silent Scope 2: Dark Silhouette •Silent Scope 2: Innocent Sweeper^{JP} •Silent Scope 2: Fatal Judgement^{EU}	Konami	Konami	2001-09-18^{NA}	Yes	Yes	Yes
Silent Scope 3	Konami	Konami	2002-10-15^{NA}	Yes	Yes	Yes
Silpheed: The Lost Planet	Game Arts, Treasure	Capcom^{JP}, Working Designs^{NA}, Swing! Entertainment^{EU}	2000-09-21^{JP}	Yes	Yes	Yes
Simoun: Shoubi Sensou – Fuuin no Remersion	Marvelous Entertainment	Marvelous Entertainment	2007-06-21^{JP}	Yes		
The Zerosen •Simple 2000 Series Vol. 117: The Zerosen^{JP}	Mobile & Gamestudio	D3 Publisher	2007-05-10^{JP}	Yes		
Simple 2000 Series Vol. 82: The Kung Fu	Vingt-et-un Systems	D3 Publisher	2005-07-28	Yes		
The Simpsons Game	EA Redwood Shores	Electronic Arts	2007-10-30^{NA}		Yes	Yes
The Simpsons: Hit & Run	Radical Entertainment	Vivendi Universal Games^{NA}, Sierra Entertainment^{PAL}	2003-09-16^{NA}		Yes	Yes
The Simpsons: Road Rage	Radical Entertainment	Electronic Arts	2001-11-24^{NA}		Yes	Yes
The Simpsons Skateboarding	The Code Monkeys	Electronic Arts	2002-11-12^{NA}		Yes	Yes
The Sims •Sim People^{JP}	Edge of Reality	Electronic Arts	2003-01-14^{NA}	Yes	Yes	Yes
The Sims 2	Maxis	Electronic Arts	2005-10-24^{NA}		Yes	Yes
The Sims 2: Castaway	EA Redwood Shores	Electronic Arts	2007-10-22^{NA}		Yes	Yes
The Sims 2: Pets	Maxis	Electronic Arts	2006-10-17^{NA}	Yes ^{KO}	Yes	Yes
The Sims Bustin' Out •The Sims^{JP}	Maxis	Electronic Arts	2003-12-15^{NA}	Yes	Yes	Yes
Sinbad Adventure wa Enomoto Kanako de Dou Desu ka	Aruze	Nippon Amuse	2004-09-30^{JP}	Yes		
SingStar	London Studio	Sony Computer Entertainment	2004-05-21^{EU}		Yes	
SingStar '80s	London Studio	Sony Computer Entertainment	2007-09-18^{NA}			Yes
SingStar '80s (EU version)	London Studio	Sony Computer Entertainment	2005-11-04^{EU}		Yes	
SingStar '90s	London Studio	Sony Computer Entertainment	2007-08-03^{EU}		Yes	Yes
SingStar ABBA	London Studio	Sony Computer Entertainment	2008-11-14^{EU}		Yes	Yes
SingStar Afrikaansee Treffers	London Studio	Sony Computer Entertainment	2011-03-30^{SAR}		Yes	
SingStar Amped	London Studio	Sony Computer Entertainment	2007-09-18^{NA}		Yes	Yes
SingStar Anthems	London Studio	Sony Computer Entertainment	2006-07-27^{AU}		Yes	
SingStar Apres-Ski Party	London Studio	Sony Computer Entertainment	2007-11-06^{EU}		Yes	
SingStar Apres-Ski Party 2	London Studio	Sony Computer Entertainment	2010-12-03^{EU}		Yes	
SingStar Bollywood	London Studio	Sony Computer Entertainment	2007-10-19^{EU}		Yes	
SingStar Boy Bands vs Girl Bands	London Studio	Sony Computer Entertainment	2008-10-17^{EU}		Yes	
SingStar Chart Hits	London Studio	Sony Computer Entertainment	2010-06-30^{AU}		Yes ^{AU}	
SingStar Chartbreaker	London Studio	Sony Computer Entertainment	2009-12-04^{EU}		Yes	
SingStar Country	London Studio	Sony Computer Entertainment	2008-10-28^{NA}			Yes
SingStar Deutsch Rock-Pop	London Studio	Sony Computer Entertainment	2006-09-12^{EU}		Yes	
SingStar Deutsch Rock-Pop Vol.2	London Studio	Sony Computer Entertainment	2007-10-02^{EU}		Yes	
SingStar Die Toten Hosen	London Studio	Sony Computer Entertainment	2007-08-28^{EU}		Yes	
SingStar Fussballhits	London Studio	Sony Computer Entertainment	2010-06-11^{EU}		Yes	
SingStar Hottest Hits	London Studio	Sony Computer Entertainment	2008-09-25^{PAL}		Yes	
SingStar Italian Party	London Studio	Sony Computer Entertainment	2007-11-28^{EU}		Yes	
SingStar Italian Party 2	London Studio	Sony Computer Entertainment	2008-11^{EU}		Yes	
SingStar La Edad de Oro del Pop Espanol	London Studio	Sony Computer Entertainment	2006-11-15^{EU}		Yes	
SingStar Latino	London Studio	Sony Computer Entertainment	2009-11-19^{NA}			Yes
SingStar Latino (EU Version)	London Studio	Sony Computer Entertainment	2007-11-21^{EU}		Yes	Yes
SingStar Legends	London Studio	Sony Computer Entertainment	2006-10-27^{EU}		Yes	Yes
SingStar Made in Germany	London Studio	Sony Computer Entertainment	2009-11-06^{EU}		Yes	
SingStar Mallorca Party	London Studio	Sony Computer Entertainment	2009-07-09^{EU}		Yes	
SingStar Mecano	London Studio	Sony Computer Entertainment	2009-11-19^{EU}		Yes	
SingStar Miliki	London Studio	Sony Computer Entertainment	2009-11-02^{EU}		Yes	
SingStar: Morangos com Acucar	London Studio	Sony Computer Entertainment	2008^{EU}		Yes	
SingStar Motown	London Studio	Sony Computer Entertainment	2009-09-17^{AU}		Yes	
SingStar Norsk pa Norsk	London Studio	Sony Computer Entertainment	2007-09-13^{EU}		Yes	
SingStar Operacion Triunfo	London Studio	Sony Computer Entertainment	2008-06-18^{EU}		Yes	
SingStar Party	London Studio	Sony Computer Entertainment	2004-11-19^{EU}		Yes	
SingStar Party Hits	London Studio	Sony Computer Entertainment	2008-04-25^{EU}		Yes	
SingStar Patito Feo	London Studio	Sony Computer Entertainment	2010-12-23^{EU}		Yes	
SingStar Pop	London Studio	Sony Computer Entertainment	2005-05-13^{EU}		Yes	Yes
SingStar Pop Hits	London Studio	Sony Computer Entertainment	2007-05-02^{EU}		Yes	
SingStar Pop Hits 2	London Studio	Sony Computer Entertainment	2007-10-24^{EU}		Yes	
SingStar Pop Hits 3	London Studio	Sony Computer Entertainment	2008-06-11^{EU}		Yes	
SingStar Pop Hits 4	London Studio	Sony Computer Entertainment	2008-11-05^{EU}		Yes	
SingStar Pop Vol. 2	London Studio	Sony Computer Entertainment	2008-09-23^{NA}			Yes
SingStar Queen	London Studio	Sony Computer Entertainment	2009-03-19^{AU}		Yes	Yes
SingStar R&B	London Studio	Sony Computer Entertainment	2007-10-25^{AU}		Yes	
SingStar Rock Ballads	London Studio	Sony Computer Entertainment	2007-09-21^{EU}		Yes	
SingStar Rocks!	London Studio	Sony Computer Entertainment	2006-04-13^{EU}		Yes	Yes
SingStar Russian Hit •SingStar: Русский Хит^{RU}	London Studio	Sony Computer Entertainment	2008-12-04^{EU}		Yes	
SingStar Schlager	London Studio	Sony Computer Entertainment	2008-12-03^{EU}		Yes	
SingStar Singalong With Disney	London Studio	Sony Computer Entertainment	2008-11-06^{AU}		Yes	
SingStar Studio 100	London Studio	Sony Computer Entertainment	2009-09-29^{EU}		Yes	
SingStar Svenska Hits Schlager	London Studio	Sony Computer Entertainment	2007-09-12^{EU}		Yes	
SingStar Take That	London Studio	Sony Computer Entertainment	2009-11-05^{AU}		Yes	
SingStar: The Biggest Solo Stars •Singstar: Polskie Hity^{PL}	London Studio	Sony Computer Entertainment	2009-06-10^{EU}		Yes	
SingStar: The Wiggles	London Studio	Sony Computer Entertainment	2010-05-27^{AU}		Yes ^{AU}	
SingStar top.it	London Studio	Sony Computer Entertainment	2006-09-11^{EU}		Yes	
SingStar Turkish Party	London Studio	Sony Computer Entertainment	2008-10-31^{EU}		Yes	
SingStar Vasco	London Studio	Sony Computer Entertainment	2009-11-18^{EU}		Yes	
Siren •Forbidden Siren^{PAL}	Japan Studio	Sony Computer Entertainment	2003-11-06^{JP}	Yes ^{JP, KO}	Yes	Yes
Siren 2 •Forbidden Siren 2^{PAL}	Japan Studio	Sony Computer Entertainment	2006-02-09^{JP}	Yes ^{JP, KO}	Yes	
Sitting Ducks	Asobo Studio	LSP^{EU}, Hip Games^{NA}	2003-12-05^{EU}		Yes	Yes
Skate Attack	Zeroscale	Midas Interactive Entertainment	2007-03-09^{EU}		Yes	
Skateboard Madness Xtreme Edition	Phoenix Games	Phoenix Games	2007-04-20^{EU}		Yes	
Ski & Shoot	Crave Entertainment	Conspiracy Entertainment	2009-02-28^{NA}			Yes
Ski Alpin 2005	49Games	RTL	2004-12-16^{EU}		Yes	
Ski Jump Pair Reloaded	Kamui	Kamui	2006-03-16^{JP}	Yes		
Ski Racing 2005	Coldwood Interactive	JoWooD Entertainment	2005-03-24^{EU}		Yes	
Ski Racing 2006	Coldwood Interactive	JoWooD Entertainment	2005-12-09^{EU}		Yes	
Ski-doo Snow X Racing •SXR: Snow X Racing^{EU}	Coldwood Interactive	Valcon Games^{NA}, Virgin Play^{EU}	2007-08-02^{NA}		Yes	Yes
Skip Beat!	5pb	5pb	2009-05-28^{JP}	Yes		
Sky Odyssey •The Sky Odyssey^{JP}	Cross	Activision^{NA}, Sony Computer Entertainment^{EU, JP}	2000-11-15^{NA}	Yes	Yes	Yes
Sky Surfer	Toka	Idea Factory^{JP}, Midas Interactive Entertainment^{EU}	2000-04-20^{JP}	Yes	Yes	
SkyGunner	PixelArts	Sony Computer Entertainment^{JP}, Atlus^{NA}	2001-09-27^{JP}	Yes		Yes
Skyscraper	Atomic Planet Entertainment	Midas Interactive Entertainment	2008-10-24^{EU}		Yes	
S.L.A.I.: Steel Lancer Arena International	Genki	Konami	2005-09-21^{NA}	Yes	Yes	Yes
Slam Tennis	Infogrames	Infogrames	2002-08-02^{EU}		Yes	
Sled Storm	EA Canada	EA Sports BIG	2002-03-11^{NA}		Yes	Yes
Slot! Pro Dx: Fujiko 2	Heiwa Corporation	Nippon Telenet	2003-02-27^{JP}	Yes		
Slotter UP Core	Aristocrat Leisure	Dorart	2003-07-10^{JP}	Yes		
Slotter UP Core 10: Mach GoGoGo2	Aristocrat Leisure	Dorart	2008-04-24^{JP}	Yes		
Slotter UP Core 11: Kyoujin no Hoshi IV	Aristocrat Leisure	Dorart	2009-03-26^{JP}	Yes		
Slotter UP Core 12: PinPon	Aristocrat Leisure	Dorart	2010-12-02^{JP}	Yes		
Slotter UP Core 2	Aristocrat Leisure	Dorart	2003-07-24^{JP}	Yes		
Slotter UP Core 3	Aristocrat Leisure	Dorart	2004-06-17^{JP}	Yes		
Slotter UP Core 4: Don-chan Gekiuchi! Jissen Pachi-Slot Ore Izuma	Aristocrat Leisure	Dorart	2004-10-21^{JP}	Yes		
Slotter UP Core 5	Aristocrat Leisure	Dorart	2004-11-25^{JP}	Yes		
Slotter UP Core 6	Aristocrat Leisure	Dorart	2005-01-27^{JP}	Yes		
Slotter UP Core 7: Dekitou da! Street Fighter II	Aristocrat Leisure	Dorart	2005-06-16^{JP}	Yes		
Slotter UP Core 8: Kyojin no Hoshi III	Aristocrat Leisure	Dorart	2005-12-22^{JP}	Yes		
Slotter UP Core 9	Aristocrat Leisure	Dorart	2006-11-02^{JP}	Yes		
Slotter UP Core Alpha	Aristocrat Leisure	Dorart	2003-12-04^{JP}	Yes		
Slotter UP Mania	Pioneer	Dorart	2003-04-24^{JP}	Yes		
Slotter UP Mania 10: Pioneer Special III	Pioneer	Dorasu	2008-05-22^{JP}	Yes		
Slotter UP Mania 11: 2027 vs 2027 II	Trade	Dorasu	2009-10-15^{JP}	Yes		
Slotter UP Mania 2	Kitadenshi	Dorasu	2003-09-11^{JP}	Yes		
Slotter UP Mania 3	EMA	Dorasu	2003-12-18^{JP}	Yes		
Slotter UP Mania 4	Pioneer	Dorasu	2004-02-26^{JP}	Yes		
Slotter UP Mania 5	Aristocrat Leisure	Dorasu	2004-10-28^{JP}	Yes		
Slotter UP Mania 6	Pioneer	Dorasu	2005-05-26^{JP}	Yes		
Slotter UP Mania 7	Pioneer	Dorasu	2005-09-01^{JP}	Yes		
Slotter UP Mania 8	Kitadenshi	Dorasu	2005-09-29^{JP}	Yes		
Slotter UP Mania 9	EMA	Dorasu	2007-12-27^{JP}	Yes		
Sly 2: Band of Thieves •Kaitou Sly Cooper 2^{JP}	Sucker Punch Productions	Sony Computer Entertainment	2004-09-14^{NA}	Yes ^{JP, KO}	Yes	Yes
Sly 3: Honor Among Thieves	Sucker Punch Productions	Sony Computer Entertainment	2005-09-26^{NA}	Yes ^{KO}	Yes	Yes
Sly Cooper and the Thievius Raccoonus	Sucker Punch Productions	Sony Computer Entertainment	2002-09-23^{NA}	Yes ^{JP, KO}	Yes	Yes
Smarties: Meltdown	EM Studios	Koch Media	2006-03-17^{EU}		Yes	
Smash Cars •Buggy Grand Prix: Kattobi! Dai-Sakusen^{JP}	Creat Studios	Metro3D^{EU, NA}, Psikyo^{JP}	2003-08-13^{NA}	Yes	Yes	Yes
Smash Court Tennis Pro Tournament •Smash Court Pro Tournament^{JP}	Namco	Namco^{JP, NA}, Sony Computer Entertainment^{EU}	2002-02-07^{JP}	Yes	Yes	Yes
Smash Court Tennis Pro Tournament 2 •Smash Court Pro Tournament 2^{JP, KO}	Namco	Namco^{JP, NA}, Sony Computer Entertainment^{EU}	2004-05-28^{EU}	Yes ^{JP, KO}	Yes	Yes
Smuggler's Run •Crazy Bump's: Kattobi Car Battle^{JP}	Angel Studios	Rockstar Games^{EU, NA}, Syscom^{JP}	2000-10-25^{NA}	Yes	Yes	Yes
Smuggler's Run 2: Hostile Territory	Angel Studios	Rockstar Games	2001-10-30^{NA}		Yes	Yes
The Sniper 2 •Simple 2000 Series Vol. 16 – The Sniper 2: Akuma no Juudan^{JP}	Best Media	D3 Publisher^{JP}, Midas Interactive Entertainment^{EU}	2002-11-28^{JP}	Yes	Yes	
Sniper Assault	Phoenix Games	Phoenix Games	2007-04-20^{EU}		Yes	
Sniper Elite	Rebellion Developments	MC2 France^{EU}, Namco^{NA}	2005-09-30^{EU}		Yes	Yes
SNK Arcade Classics Vol. 1	SNK Playmore	SNK Playmore^{KO, NA}, Ignition Entertainment^{PAL}	2008-05-05^{NA}	Yes ^{KO}	Yes	Yes
SNK Slot Panic Kyuuji	SNK Playmore	SNK Playmore	2006-12-21^{JP}	Yes		
SnoCross 2: Featuring Blair Morgan	Sensory Sweep Studios	Oxygen Games^{PAL}, Crave Entertainment^{NA}	2006-04-19^{AU}		Yes	Yes
Snoopy vs. the Red Baron	Smart Bomb Interactive	Namco Bandai Games	2006-10-24^{NA}			Yes
Snow	HuneX	Interchannel	2004-02-26^{JP}	Yes		
The Snow Queen Quest	Broadsword Interactive	Oxygen Games	2007-02-16^{JP}		Yes	
Snow Rider	Phoenix Games	Phoenix Games	2006-10-06^{EU}		Yes	
Snow White and the 7 Clever Boys	Phoenix Games	Phoenix Games	2006-12-15^{EU}		Yes	
Snowboard Heaven	Capcom	Capcom	2000-11-16^{JP}	Yes		
Snowboard Racer 2 •Simple 2000 Series Vol. 6: The Snowboard^{JP}	Atelier Double	D3 Publisher^{JP}, Midas Interactive Entertainment^{EU}	2002-07-25^{JP}	Yes	Yes	
Soccer America: International Cup •Greatest Striker^{JP} •International League Soccer^{EU}	Taito	Taito^{JP}, Eon Digital Entertainment^{EU}, Hot-B^{NA}	2000-12-02^{JP}	Yes	Yes	Yes
Soccer Kantoku Saihai Simulation: Formation Final	Konami	Konami	2003-09-18^{JP}	Yes		
Soccer Life!	Cavia	Banpresto^{JP}, 505 Game Street^{EU}	2004-02-26^{JP}	Yes	Yes	
Soccer Life 2	Cavia	Banpresto^{JP}, 505 Game Street^{EU}	2005-06-09^{JP}	Yes	Yes	
Soccer Mania •Football Mania^{EU}	Silicon Dreams Studio	Lego Mania^{NA}, Electronic Arts^{EU}	2002-06-17^{NA}		Yes	Yes
Soccer Tsuku 2002: J.League Pro Soccer Club o Tsukurou!	Smilebit	Sega	2002-03-07^{JP}	Yes		
SOCOM 3 U.S. Navy SEALs	Zipper Interactive	Sony Computer Entertainment	2005-10-11^{NA}	Yes	Yes	Yes
SOCOM II U.S. Navy SEALs	Zipper Interactive	Sony Computer Entertainment	2003-11-04^{NA}	Yes	Yes	Yes
SOCOM U.S. Navy SEALs	Zipper Interactive	Sony Computer Entertainment	2002-08-27^{NA}	Yes	Yes	Yes
SOCOM U.S. Navy SEALs: Combined Assault	Zipper Interactive	Sony Computer Entertainment	2006-11-07^{NA}		Yes	Yes
Sokudoku Master	Magnolia	Magnolia	2006-10-19^{JP}	Yes		
Sol Divide	Psikyo	505 Game Street	2006-03^{EU}		Yes	
Soldier of Fortune: Gold Edition	Pipedream Interactive	Majesco	2001-11-11^{NA}		Yes	Yes
Son of The Lion King	Phoenix Games	Phoenix Games	2006^{EU}		Yes	
Sonic Gems Collection • Sonic Gems Collection^{JP} (different version)	Sonic Team	Sega	2005-08-11^{JP}	Yes	Yes	
Sonic Heroes	Sonic Team	Sega	2003-12-04^{JP}	Yes	Yes	Yes
Sonic Mega Collection Plus	Sonic Team	Sega	2004-11-02^{NA}	Yes	Yes	Yes
Sonic Riders	Sonic Team	Sega	2006-02-21^{NA}	Yes ^{JP, KO}	Yes	Yes
Sonic Riders: Zero Gravity	Sonic Team	Sega	2008-01-08^{NA}		Yes	Yes
Sonic Unleashed	Sonic Team	Sega	2008-11-18^{NA}		Yes	Yes
The Sopranos: Road to Respect	7 Studios	THQ	2006-11-07^{NA}		Yes	Yes
Sorairo no Fuukin Remix	PrincessSoft	PrincessSoft	2005-07-07^{JP}	Yes		
Sorayume	Takuyo	Takuyo	2008-06-19^{JP}	Yes		
Sōsei no Akuarion	Sting	Bandai	2005-06-30^{JP}	Yes		
Soshite Bokura wa... And He Said	Interchannel	Interchannel	2005-06-30^{JP}	Yes		
Soshite Kono Sora ni Kirameku Kimi no Uta	Datam Polystar	Datam Polystar	2006-05-25^{JP}	Yes		
Soshite Kono Sora ni Kirameku Kimi no Uta XXX	Datam Polystar	Datam Polystar	2007-02-22^{JP}	Yes		
Sotsugyou 2nd Generation	GeneX	GeneX	2006-03-09^{JP}	Yes		
Soukoku no Kusabi: Hiiro no Kakera 3	Idea Factory	Idea Factory	2008-08-07^{JP}	Yes		
Soukou Kihei Votoms	Yuke's	Bandai Namco Games	2007-11-15^{JP}	Yes		
Soul Eater: Battle Resonance	BEC	Bandai Namco Games	2009-01-29^{JP}	Yes		
Soul Link Extension	Examu	Interchannel	2006-06-29^{JP}	Yes		
Soul Nomad & the World Eaters •Soul Cradle: Sekai o Kurau Mono^{JP}	Nippon Ichi Software	Nippon Ichi Software^{JP, NA}, Koei^{PAL}	2007-02-15^{JP}	Yes	Yes	Yes
Soul Reaver 2	Crystal Dynamics	Eidos Interactive	2001-10-31^{NA}	Yes	Yes	Yes
Soulcalibur II	Namco	Namco	2003-03-27^{JP}	Yes ^{JP, KO}	Yes	Yes
Soulcalibur III	Namco	Namco	2005-10-25^{NA}	Yes ^{JP, KO}	Yes	Yes
Soutenryuu: The Arcade	Taito	DigiCube	2003-03-27^{JP}	Yes		
Space Channel 5	UGA	Sega^{JP}, Sony Computer Entertainment^{EU}	2002-03-15^{EU}	Yes	Yes	
Space Channel 5: Part 2	UGA	Sega^{JP}, Sony Computer Entertainment^{EU}	2002-02-14^{JP}	Yes	Yes	
Space Chimps	Red Tribe	Brash Entertainment	2008-07-15^{NA}		Yes	Yes
Space Fishermen	Land Ho!	Sony Computer Entertainment	2002-10-24^{JP}	Yes		
Space Invaders Anniversary	Taito	Taito^{JP}, Empire Interactive^{EU}	2003-07-31^{JP}	Yes	Yes	
Space Invaders: Invasion Day •Space Raiders^{JP} •Simple 2000 Series Vol. 52: The Chikyuu Shinryokugun: Space Raiders^{JP}	Taito	Taito^{JP}, Sammy Europe^{EU}, D3 Publisher^{JP}	2002-12-19^{JP}	Yes	Yes	
Space Race	Infogrames Melbourne House	Infogrames	2002-02-08^{EU}		Yes	Yes
Space Rebellion	Phoenix Games	Phoenix Games	2006-12-08^{EU}		Yes	
Space Venus Starring Morning Musume (Note: includes a rhythm mini-game based on TVDJ.)	Sony Music Entertainment	Sony Music Entertainment	2001-01-11^{JP}	Yes		
Space War Attack •Simple 2000 Series Vol. 78: The Uchuu Daisensou^{JP}	Bit Town	D3 Publisher, 505 Game Street	2005-05-26^{JP}	Yes		
Spartan: Total Warrior	The Creative Assembly	Sega	2005-10-07^{EU}	Yes	Yes	Yes
Spawn: Armageddon	Point of View	Namco^{JP, NA}, Electronic Arts^{EU}	2003-11-21^{NA}	Yes	Yes	Yes
Special Forces •Simple 2000 Series Vol. 108: The Nippon Tokushubutai^{JP}	Vingt-et-un Systems	D3 Publisher^{JP}, Essential Games^{EU}	2006-09-14^{JP}	Yes	Yes	
Spectral Force Chronicle	Neverland	Idea Factory	2005-04-28^{JP}	Yes		
Spectral Force: Radical Elements	Neverland	Idea Factory	2004-09-16^{JP}	Yes		
Spectral Gene	Neverland	Idea Factory	2007-12-13^{JP}	Yes		
Spectral Souls	Neverland	Idea Factory	2003-10-30^{JP}	Yes		
Spectral vs Generation	Idea Factory	Idea Factory^{JP}, Midas Interactive Entertainment^{PAL}	2006-04-20^{JP}	Yes	Yes	
Speed Challenge: Jacques Villeneuve's Racing Vision	Ubisoft Bucharest	Ubisoft	2002-11-22^{PAL}		Yes	
Speed Kings	Climax Studios	Acclaim Entertainment	2003-05-28^{NA}		Yes	Yes
Speed Machines III	Phoenix Games	Phoenix Games	2006^{EU}		Yes	
Speed Racer	Sidhe Interactive	Warner Bros. Interactive	2008-09-16^{NA}		Yes	Yes
Speedboat GP	Phoenix Games	Phoenix Games	2006^{EU}		Yes	
Sphinx and the Cursed Mummy	Eurocom	THQ	2003-11-10^{NA}	Yes ^{KO}	Yes	Yes
Spider-Man	Treyarch	Activision^{EU, NA}, Capcom^{JP}	2002-04-16^{NA}	Yes	Yes	Yes
Spider-Man 2	Treyarch	Activision^{EU, NA}, Taito^{JP}	2004-06-28^{NA}	Yes	Yes	Yes
Spider-Man 3	Vicarious Visions	Activision	2007-05-04^{NA}	Yes ^{JP, KO}	Yes	Yes
Spider-Man: Friend or Foe	Next Level Games	Activision	2007-10-02^{NA}		Yes	Yes
Spider-Man: Web of Shadows – Amazing Allies Edition	Amaze Entertainment	Activision	2008-10-21^{NA}		Yes	Yes
The Spiderwick Chronicles	Stormfront Studios	Sierra Entertainment	2008-02-05^{NA}		Yes	Yes
SpinDrive Ping Pong •Fukuhara Ai no Takkyu Icchokusen^{JP}	Success	Success, Empire Interactive	2004-06-24^{JP}	Yes	Yes	
Splashdown	Rainbow Studios	Infogrames	2001-11-05^{NA}	Yes	Yes	Yes
Splashdown – Rides Gone Wild	Rainbow Studios	THQ	2003-08-05^{NA}		Yes	Yes
Splatter Master •Simple 2000 Series Vol. 64: The Splatter Action^{JP}	Vingt-et-un Systems	D3 Publisher^{JP}, 505 Game Street^{EU}	2004-10-14^{JP}	Yes	Yes	
SpongeBob SquarePants: Battle for Bikini Bottom	Heavy Iron Studios	THQ	2003-10-31^{NA}		Yes	Yes
SpongeBob SquarePants: Creature from the Krusty Krab •SpongeBob^{JP}	Blitz Games	THQ	2006-10-16^{NA}	Yes	Yes	Yes
SpongeBob SquarePants Featuring Nicktoons: Globs of Doom	Incinerator Studios	THQ	2008-10-20^{NA}		Yes	Yes
SpongeBob SquarePants: Lights, Camera, Pants!	THQ Studio Australia	THQ	2005-10-21^{NA}	Yes ^{KO}	Yes	Yes
The SpongeBob SquarePants Movie	Heavy Iron Studios	THQ	2004-10-27^{NA}		Yes	Yes
SpongeBob SquarePants: Revenge of the Flying Dutchman	Big Sky Software	THQ	2002-11-21^{NA}		Yes	Yes
SpongeBob's Atlantis SquarePantis	Blitz Games	THQ	2007-10-23^{NA}		Yes	Yes
Springdale: Riding Adventures	Hidden Entertainment	PAN Vision	2010-03-26^{EU}		Yes	
Sprint Car Challenge	Liquid Games	Liquid Games	2005-08-16^{EU}		Yes	
Sprint Cars 2: Showdown at Eldora	Big Ant Studios	THQ	2008-03-11^{NA}			Yes
Sprint Cars: Road to Knoxville	Big Ant Studios	THQ	2006-07-26^{NA}		Yes	Yes
Spy Fiction	Access Games	Sammy	2003-12-25^{JP}	Yes	Yes	Yes
Spy Hunter	Paradigm Entertainment	Midway Games	2001-09-24^{NA}	Yes	Yes	Yes
Spy Hunter 2	Angel Studios	Midway Games	2003-11-24^{NA}		Yes	Yes
Spy Hunter: Nowhere to Run	Terminal Reality	Midway Games	2006-09-05^{NA}		Yes	Yes
Spy vs. Spy	Vicious Cycle Software	Global Star Software	2005-04-29^{EU}		Yes	
Spyro: A Hero's Tail	Eurocom	Vivendi Universal Games^{NA}, Sierra Entertainment^{PAL}	2004-11-09^{NA}		Yes	Yes
Spyro: Enter the Dragonfly	Check Six Games	Universal Interactive	2002-11-05^{NA}		Yes	Yes
SSX •X-treme Racing SSX^{JP}	EA Canada	EA Sports BIG	2000-10-26^{NA}	Yes	Yes	Yes
SSX 3	EA Canada	EA Sports BIG	2003-10-20^{NA}	Yes	Yes	Yes
SSX on Tour	EA Canada	EA Sports BIG	2005-10-11^{NA}	Yes	Yes	Yes
SSX Tricky (Note: update for SSX.)	EA Canada	EA Sports BIG	2001-11-05^{NA}	Yes	Yes	Yes
Stacked with Daniel Negreanu •Stacked^{PAL}	5000 ft Inc.	Myelin Media	2006-05-31^{NA}		Yes	Yes
Standard Daisenryaku: Dengekisen	SystemSoft Alpha	Sammy	2004-11-11^{JP}	Yes		
Standard Daisenryaku: Shiwareta Shouri	SystemSoft Alpha	Sammy	2005-06-02^{JP}	Yes		
Star Ocean: Till the End of Time •Star Ocean 3: Till the End of Time^{JP}	tri-Ace	Square Enix^{JP, NA}, Ubisoft^{PAL}	2003-02-27^{JP}	Yes	Yes	Yes
Star Soldier	Hudson Soft	Hudson Soft	2003-11-27^{JP}	Yes		
Star Trek: Conquest	4J Studios	Bethesda Softworks^{NA}, Koch Media^{EU}	2007-11-20^{NA}		Yes	Yes
Star Trek: Encounters	4J Studios	Bethesda Softworks^{NA}, Ubisoft^{EU}	2006-10-04^{NA}		Yes	Yes
Star Trek: Shattered Universe	Starsphere Interactive	TDK Mediactive^{NA}, Global Star Software^{EU}	2004-01-13^{NA}		Yes	Yes
Star Trek: Voyager – Elite Force	PipeDream Interactive	Majesco^{NA}, Codemasters^{EU}	2001-12-06^{NA}		Yes	Yes
Star Wars: Battlefront	Pandemic Studios	LucasArts^{EU, NA}, Electronic Arts^{JP}	2004-09-20^{NA}	Yes	Yes	Yes
Star Wars: Battlefront II	Pandemic Studios	LucasArts^{EU, NA}, Electronic Arts^{JP}	2005-10-31^{EU}	Yes	Yes	Yes
Star Wars: Bounty Hunter •Star Wars: Jango Fett^{JP}	LucasArts	LucasArts^{EU, NA}, Electronic Arts^{JP}	2002-11-19^{NA}	Yes	Yes	Yes
Star Wars Episode III: Revenge of the Sith •Star Wars Episode III: Sith no Fukushuu^{JP}	The Collective	LucasArts^{EU, NA}, Electronic Arts^{JP}	2005-05-04^{NA}	Yes	Yes	Yes
Star Wars: Jedi Starfighter	LucasArts	LucasArts^{NA/EU}, Electronic Arts^{JP}	2002-03-10^{NA}	Yes	Yes	Yes
Star Wars Racer Revenge	Rainbow Studios	LucasArts	2002-02-11^{NA}		Yes	Yes
Star Wars: Starfighter	LucasArts	LucasArts^{NA/EU}, Electronic Arts^{JP}	2001-02-19^{NA}	Yes	Yes	Yes
Star Wars: Super Bombad Racing	Lucas Learning	LucasArts	2001-04-23^{NA}		Yes	Yes
Star Wars: The Clone Wars	Pandemic Studios	LucasArts	2002-12-10^{NA}		Yes	Yes
Star Wars: The Clone Wars – Republic Heroes	Krome Studios	LucasArts	2009-10-06^{NA}			Yes
Star Wars: The Force Unleashed	Krome Studios	LucasArts^{NA, PAL}, Activision^{JP}	2008-09-16^{NA}	Yes	Yes	Yes
Starsky & Hutch	Mind's Eye Productions	Empire Interactive^{EU}, Gotham Games^{NA}	2003-06-20^{EU}	Yes ^{KO}	Yes	Yes
StarTRain: Your Past Makes Your Future	PrincessSoft	PrincessSoft	2007-11-29^{JP}	Yes		
State of Emergency	VIS Entertainment	Rockstar Games	2002-02-12^{NA}		Yes	Yes
State of Emergency 2 •State of Emergency Revenge^{JP}	DC Studios	SouthPeak Games^{EU, NA}, Spike^{JP}	2006-02-14^{NA}	Yes	Yes	Yes
Steady x Study	Idea Factory	Idea Factory	2004-03-25^{JP}	Yes		
Stealth Force 2	Midas Interactive Entertainment	Midas Interactive Entertainment	2008-10-24^{EU}		Yes	
Stealth Force: The War on Terror	Atomic Planet Entertainment	Midas Interactive Entertainment	2005-06-10^{EU}		Yes	
Steam Express	Phoenix Games	Phoenix Games	2007-12-01^{EU}		Yes	
Steambot Chronicles •Poncotsu Roman Daikatsugeki Bumpy Trot^{AS, JP, KO}	Irem	Irem^{AS, JP, KO}, Atlus^{NA}, 505 Game Street^{PAL}	2005-06-30^{JP}	Yes ^{AS, JP, KO}	Yes	Yes
Steamboy	SIMS	Bandai	2005-06-09^{JP}	Yes		
Steel Dragon EX •Simple 2000 Series Vol. 37: The Shooting: Double Shienryu^{JP}	Warashi	D3 Publisher^{JP}, Midas Interactive Entertainment^{EU}	2003-10-23^{JP}	Yes	Yes	
Stella Deus: The Gate of Eternity •Stella Deus^{JP}	Pinegrow	Atlus^{JP, NA}, 505 Game Street^{EU}	2004-10-28^{JP}	Yes	Yes	Yes
Stepping Selection	Jaleco	Jaleco	2000-03-04^{JP}	Yes		
Stock Car Crash	Brain in a Jar	Midas Interactive Entertainment	2006-04-28^{EU}		Yes	
Stolen	Blue 52	Hip Games	2005-04-01^{EU}		Yes	Yes
Strawberry Panic! Girls' School in Fullbloom	MediaWorks	MediaWorks	2006-08-24^{JP}	Yes		
Strawberry Shortcake: The Sweet Dreams Game	EKO Software	The Game Factory	2006-10-20^{EU}		Yes	Yes
Street Boyz •Simple 2000 Ultimate Series Vol. 21: Kenka Joutou! Yankee Banchou^{JP}	Tamsoft	D3 Publisher^{JP}, 505 Game Street^{EU}	2004-11-11^{JP}	Yes	Yes	
Street Cricket Champions	Trine Games	Sony Computer Entertainment	2010-10-01^{IN}		Yes ^{IN}	
Street Cricket Champions 2	Trine Games	Sony Computer Entertainment	2012-09-29^{IN}		Yes ^{IN}	
Street Dance	Oxygen Games	Oxygen Games	2006-10-20^{EU}		Yes	
Street Fighter Alpha Anthology •Street Fighter Zero: Fighters Generation^{JP}	Capcom	Capcom	2006-05-25^{JP}	Yes	Yes	Yes
Street Fighter EX3	Arika	Capcom	2000-03-04^{JP}	Yes	Yes	Yes
Street Fighter III: 3rd Strike – Fight for the Future	Capcom	Capcom	2004-07-19^{JP}	Yes		
Street Golfer •Simple 2000 Ultimate Series Vol. 12: Street Golfer^{JP}	Polygon Magic	D3 Publisher^{JP}, 505 Game Street^{EU}	2002-06-27^{JP}	Yes	Yes	
Street Hoops	Black Ops Entertainment	Activision	2002-08-12^{NA}		Yes	Yes
Street Mahjong Trans-Asakami 2	Sunsoft	Sunsoft	2000-06-15^{JP}	Yes		
Street Racing Syndicate	Eutechnyx	Namco^{NA}, Codemasters^{EU}	2004-08-31^{NA}		Yes	Yes
Street Warrior	Phoenix Games	Phoenix Games	2007-01-12^{EU}		Yes	
Stretch Panic •Freak Out^{EU} •Hippa Linda^{JP}	Treasure	Swing! Entertainment^{EU}, Conspiracy Entertainment^{NA}, Kadokawa Games^{JP}	2001-07-27^{EU}	Yes	Yes	Yes
Strike Force Bowling	LAB Rats Games	Crave Entertainment^{NA}, Play It!^{EU}	2004-05-10^{NA}		Yes	Yes
Strike Witches: Anata to Dekiru Koto – A Little Peaceful Days	Russel	Russel	2010-05-27^{JP}	Yes		
Stuart Little 3: Big Photo Adventure	Magenta Software	Sony Computer Entertainment^{EU}, Sega^{NA}	2005-10-14^{EU}	Yes ^{KO}	Yes	Yes
Stunt GP	Team17	Titus Software	2001-11-13^{NA}	Yes	Yes	Yes
Stuntman	Reflections Interactive	Infogrames	2002-06-25^{NA}	Yes	Yes	Yes
Stuntman: Ignition	Paradigm Entertainment	THQ	2007-08-28^{NA}	Yes	Yes	Yes
Stylish Mahjong Usagi •Simple 2000 Ultimate Series Vol. 22: Stylish Mahjong Usagi^{JP}	Warashi	D3 Publisher	2004-12-09^{JP}	Yes		
Sub Rebellion •U: Underwater Unit^{JP}	Racjin	Irem^{JP}, Metro3D^{EU, NA}	2002-05-02^{JP}	Yes	Yes	Yes
Sudoku •SuperLite 2000 Puzzle: Sudoku^{JP}	Success	Success	2003-12-04^{JP}	Yes		
The Suffering	Surreal Software	Midway Games	2004-03-09^{NA}		Yes	Yes
The Suffering: Ties That Bind	Surreal Software	Midway Games	2005-09-26^{NA}		Yes	Yes
Sugar + Spice! Anoko no Suteki na Nanimokamo	Alchemist	Alchemist	2008-09-25^{JP}	Yes		
Sugar Sugar Rune: Koimo Osharemo Pick-Up	Bandai	Bandai	2005-12-15^{JP}	Yes		
Suggoi! Arcana Heart 2	Examu	AQ Interactive	2009-04-09^{JP}	Yes		
Suigetsu Mayoi-Gokoro	KID	KID	2004-10-28^{JP}	Yes		
Suika A.S+ Eternal Name	Circus	Sweets	2007-08-30^{JP}	Yes		
Suikoden III •Gensō Suikoden III^{JP}	Konami	Konami	2002-07-11^{JP}	Yes		Yes
Suikoden IV •Gensō Suikoden IV^{JP}	Konami	Konami	2004-08-19^{JP}	Yes	Yes	Yes
Suikoden Tactics •Rhapsodia^{JP}	Konami	Konami	2005-09-22^{JP}	Yes	Yes	Yes
Suikoden V •Gensō Suikoden V^{JP}	Konami	Konami	2006-02-23^{JP}	Yes	Yes	Yes
The Suiri •Simple 2000 Series Vol. 67: The Suiri ~Soshite Daremo Inakunatta^{JP}	Tomcat System	D3 Publisher	2004-11-11^{JP}	Yes		
The Suiri: Aratanaru 20 no Jikenbo •Simple 2000 Series Vol. 17: The Suiri – Aratanaru 20 no Jikenbo^{JP}	Tomcat System	D3 Publisher	2002-12-19^{JP}	Yes		
Sui-Sui-Sweet	Tactics	Starfish SD	2003-12-25^{JP}	Yes		
Suki Namono wa Suki Dakarashou Ganai!! First Limit & Target Nights: Sukisyo Episode #1 & #2	Interchannel	Interchannel	2004-03-25^{JP}	Yes		
Suki Namono wa Suki Dakarashou Ganai!! Rain: Sukisyo Episode #3	Interchannel	Interchannel	2004-10-21^{JP}	Yes		
Sukusuku Inufuku	Video System	Hamster Corporation	2004-08-05^{JP}	Yes		
The Sum of All Fears	Red Storm Entertainment	Ubisoft	2002-05-31^{EU}		Yes	
Summer Athletics	49Games	Conspiracy Entertainment^{NA}, DTP Entertainment^{EU}	2008-07-29^{NA}		Yes	Yes
Summer Heat Beach Volleyball	Acclaim Studios Cheltenham	Acclaim Entertainment	2003-07-01^{NA}	Yes ^{KO}	Yes	Yes
Summon Night 3	Flight-Plan	Banpresto	2003-08-07^{JP}	Yes		
Summon Night 4	Flight-Plan	Banpresto	2006-11-30^{JP}	Yes		
Summon Night EX-Thesis: Yoake no Tsubasa	Flight-Plan	Banpresto	2005-08-04^{JP}	Yes		
Summon Night Gran-These: Horobi no Tsurugi to Yakusoku no Kishi	Flight-Plan	Banpresto	2010-03-11^{JP}	Yes		
Summoner	Volition	THQ	2000-10-24^{NA}		Yes	Yes
Summoner 2	Volition	THQ	2002-09-23^{NA}		Yes	Yes
Sumomo mo Momo mo: Chijou Saikyou no Yome	Marvelous Entertainment	Marvelous Entertainment	2007-06-21^{JP}	Yes		
Sunny Garcia Surfing	Krome Studios	Ubisoft	2001-10-22^{NA}		Yes	Yes
Sunrise Eiyuutan 2	Atelier-Sai	Sunrise Interactive	2001-12-20^{JP}	Yes		
Sunrise Eiyuutan 3	Sunrise Interactive	Sunrise Interactive	2006-06-01^{JP}	Yes		
Sunrise Eiyuutan R	Atelier-Sai	Sunrise Interactive	2000-11-22^{JP}	Yes		
Sunrise World War	Atelier-Sai	Bandai	2003-09-25^{JP}	Yes		
Sunsoft Collection	SNK Playmore	SNK Playmore	2008-06-26^{JP}	Yes		
Super Bust-A-Move •Super Puzzle Bobble^{JP}	Taito	Taito^{JP}, Acclaim Entertainment^{EU, NA}	2000-09-28^{JP}	Yes	Yes	Yes
Super Bust-A-Move 2 •Super Puzzle Bobble 2^{JP}	Taito	Taito^{JP}, Ubisoft^{EU, NA}	2002-09-19^{JP}	Yes	Yes	Yes
Super Dragon Ball Z	Crafts & Meister	Banpresto^{JP}, Atari^{NA, PAL}	2006-06-29^{JP}	Yes	Yes	Yes
Super Farm	Asobo Studio	Ignition Entertainment	2003-10-17^{EU}		Yes	
Super Fruit Fall	SLAM Productions	System 3	2006-09-01^{EU}		Yes	
Super Galdelic Hour	Enix	Enix	2001-03-29^{JP}	Yes		
Super Micchan	Jaleco	Jaleco	2001-04-26^{JP}	Yes		
Super Monkey Ball Adventure	Traveller's Tales	Sega	2006-06-30^{EU}		Yes	Yes
Super Monkey Ball Deluxe	Sega	Sega	2005-03-15^{NA}	Yes ^{JP, KO}	Yes	Yes
Super PickUps	Milestone srl	XS Games	2007-09-25^{NA}		Yes	Yes
Super Robot Wars Alpha Premium Edition	Bandai	Banpresto	2005-07-28^{JP}	Yes		
Super Robot Wars Impact	Banpresto	Banpresto	2002-03-28^{JP}	Yes		
Super Robot Wars MX	Banpresto	Banpresto	2004-05-27^{JP}	Yes		
Super Robot Wars Original Generation Gaiden	Banpresto	Banpresto	2007-12-24^{AS}	Yes ^{AS, JP, KO}		
Super Robot Wars Original Generations	Banpresto	Banpresto	2007-06-26^{AS}	Yes ^{AS, JP, KO}		
Super Robot Wars: Scramble Commander	Banpresto	Banpresto	2003-11-06^{JP}	Yes		
Super Robot Wars: Scramble Commander the 2nd	Banpresto	Banpresto	2007-11-01^{JP}	Yes		
Super Robot Wars Z	Banpresto	Banpresto	2008-09-25^{JP}	Yes ^{AS, JP}		
Super Robot Wars Z Special Disc (Note: stand-alone expansion for Super Robot Wars Z.)	Banpresto	Bandai Namco Games	2009-03-05^{JP}	Yes		
Super Rugby League 2 •NRL Rugby League 2^{AU}	Sidhe Interactive	Tru Blu Entertainment	2005-12-08^{AU}		Yes	
Super Shanghai 2005	Starfish SD	Starfish SD	2004-11-25^{JP}	Yes		
Super Trucks Racing •Super Trucks^{EU, JP}	Jester Interactive	Jester Interactive^{EU}, XS Games^{NA}, Success^{JP}	2002-06-28^{EU}	Yes	Yes	Yes
Superbike GP	Phoenix Games	Phoenix Games	2006^{EU}		Yes	
Super-Bikes Riding Challenge	Milestone srl	Black Bean Games	2006-09-15^{EU}		Yes	
Supercar Street Challenge	Exakt Entertainment	Activision	2001-10-22^{NA}	Yes	Yes	Yes
Superman Returns	EA Tiburon	Electronic Arts	2006-11-20^{NA}	Yes ^{KO}	Yes	Yes
Superman: Shadow of Apokolips	Infogrames Sheffield	Infogrames	2002-09-25^{NA}		Yes	Yes
Surfing Air Show with RatBoy	Now Production	Now Production	2002-07-18^{JP}	Yes		
Surfing H3O •Surfroid: Densetsu no Surfer^{JP}	Opus	ASCII Corporation^{JP}, Rockstar Games^{EU, NA}	2000-08-10^{JP}	Yes	Yes	Yes
Surf's Up	Ubisoft Montreal	Ubisoft	2007-05-30^{NA}		Yes	Yes
Surveillance Kanshisha	Sony Computer Entertainment	Sony Computer Entertainment	2002-04-25^{JP}	Yes		
The Survival Game •Simple 2000 Series Vol. 56: The Survival Game^{JP}	Best Media	D3 Publisher	2004-07-22^{JP}	Yes		
The Survival Game 2 •Simple 2000 Series Vol. 119: The Survival Game 2^{JP}	Best Media	D3 Publisher	2007-08-09^{JP}	Yes		
Suzuki Super-Bikes II: Riding Challenge	Milestone srl	Valcon Games	2006-11-07^{NA}			Yes
Suzuki TT Superbikes •TT Superbikes Real Road Racing^{EU} •TT SuperBikes^{JP}	Jester Interactive	Jester Interactive^{EU}, Valcon Games^{NA}, Taito^{JP}	2005-04-29^{EU}	Yes	Yes	Yes
Suzuki TT Superbikes: Real Road Racing Championship •TT Superbikes Real Road Racing Championship^{EU}	Jester Interactive	Jester Interactive^{EU}, Valcon Games^{NA}	2008-04-07^{EU}		Yes	Yes
Suzumiya Haruhi no Tomadoi	Banpresto	Banpresto	2008-01-31^{JP}	Yes		
Suzunone Seven: Rebirth Knot	Alchemist	Alchemist	2010-05-27^{JP}	Yes		
SVC Chaos: SNK vs. Capcom	SNK Playmore	SNK Playmore^{JP}, Ignition Entertainment^{EU}	2003-12-25^{JP}	Yes	Yes	
Sven-Göran Eriksson's World Challenge •WM Nationalspieler^{DE} •Marcel Desailly Pro Football^{FR}	Anco Software	3DO	2002-05-24^{EU}		Yes	
Sven-Goran Eriksson's World Cup Manager	Anco Software	3DO	2002-06-28^{EU}		Yes	
Swashbucklers: Blue vs. Grey	Akella	Atari	2007-11-20^{NA}			Yes
SWAT: Global Strike Team	Argonaut Games	Sierra Entertainment	2003-10-29^{NA}		Yes	Yes
SWAT: Siege	Phoenix Games	Phoenix Games	2006-11-24^{EU}		Yes	
Sweet Legacy	Frontwing	Pacific Century Cyber Works	2002-12-26^{JP}	Yes		
Sweet Season	Takuyo	Takuyo	2005-03-31^{JP}	Yes		
SweetHoneyComing	Kadokawa Games	Kadokawa Games	2009-09-03^{JP}	Yes		
Swing Away Golf •Golf Paradise^{JP}	T&E Soft	T&E Soft^{JP}, Electronic Arts^{EU, NA}	2000-03-23^{JP}	Yes	Yes	Yes
Switch	Sega	Sega	2002-08-29^{JP}	Yes		
The Sword of Etheria •Oz^{JP} •Chains of Power^{KO}	Konami	Konami	2005-06-30^{JP}	Yes ^{JP, KO}	Yes	
Sword of the Samurai •Kengo 2^{JP}	Genki	Genki^{JP}, Ubisoft^{EU}	2002-06-27^{JP}	Yes	Yes	
Swords of Destiny •Tian Xing: Swords of Destiny^{JP}	Artoon	Marvelous Entertainment	2005-02-17^{JP}	Yes	Yes	
SX Superstar	Climax Studios	Acclaim Entertainment	2003-07-04^{EU}		Yes	
Syberia	Microids	Microids	2003-03-28^{EU}		Yes	
Syberia II	Microids	Ubisoft	2004-11-26^{EU}		Yes	
S.Y.K Renshouden (Note: stand-alone expansion for S.Y.K Shinsetsu Saiyūki.)	Otomate	Idea Factory	2010-03-11^{JP}	Yes		
S.Y.K Shinsetsu Saiyūki	Idea Factory	Idea Factory	2009-08-13^{JP}	Yes		
Syphon Filter: Dark Mirror	Bend Studio	Sony Computer Entertainment	2007-09-18^{NA}		Yes	Yes
Syphon Filter: Logan's Shadow	Bend Studio	Sony Computer Entertainment	2010-06-02^{NA}			Yes
Syphon Filter: The Omega Strain	Bend Studio	Sony Computer Entertainment	2004-05-04^{NA}	Yes ^{KO}	Yes	Yes
The Table Game •Simple 2000 Series Vol. 1: The Table Game^{JP}	Yuki	D3 Publisher	2001-05-31^{JP}	Yes		
Taiheiyou no Arashi: Senkan Yamato, Akatsuki ni Shutsugekisu	SystemSoft	SystemSoft	2008-01-31^{JP}	Yes		
Taiko: Drum Master •Taiko no Tatsujin: Taiko Drum Master^{AS, JP}	Namco	Namco	2004-10-26^{NA}	Yes ^{AS, JP}		Yes
Taiko no Tatsujin: Appare Sandaime	Namco	Namco	2003-10-28^{AS}	Yes ^{AS, JP}		
Taiko no Tatsujin: Atsumare! Matsuri Da!! Yondaime	Namco	Namco	2004-07-22^{JP}	Yes		
Taiko no Tatsujin: Doka! to Oomori Nanadaime	Namco	Namco	2006-12-05^{AS}	Yes ^{AS, JP}		
Taiko no Tatsujin: Doki! Shinkyoku Darake no Haru Matsuri	Namco	Namco	2003-03-27^{JP}	Yes		
Taiko no Tatsujin: Go! Go! Godaime	Namco	Namco	2004-12-07^{AS}	Yes ^{AS, JP}		
Taiko no Tatsujin: Tatakon de Dodon ga Don	Namco	Namco	2002-10-24^{JP}	Yes		
Taiko no Tatsujin: Tobikkiri! Anime Special	Namco	Namco	2005-08-02^{AS}	Yes ^{AS, JP}		
Taiko no Tatsujin: Wai Wai Happy Rokudaime	Namco	Namco	2005-12-06^{AS}	Yes ^{AS, JP}		
Taiko no Tatsujin: Waku Waku Anime Matsuri	Namco	Namco	2003-12-18^{JP}	Yes		
Taikou Risshiden IV	Koei	Koei	2001-11-29^{JP}	Yes		
Taikou Risshiden V	Koei	Koei	2004-08-26^{JP}	Yes		
Taikyoku Mahjong: Net de Ron!	Arika	Arika	2001-12-20^{JP}	Yes		
The Tairyou Jigoku •Simple 2000 Series Vol. 113: The Tairyou Jigoku^{JP}	Arika	Arika	2007-02-22^{JP}	Yes		
Taisen! Bakutama Poi Poi •Simple 2000 Ultimate Series Vol. 17: Taisen! Bakudan Poi Poi^{JP}	Psikyo	D3 Publisher	2004-02-26^{JP}	Yes		
Taisen Hot Gimmick: Axes-Jong	Psikyo	X-Nauts	2005-04-28^{JP}	Yes		
Taisen Hot Gimmick: Cosplay-jong	Psikyo	X-Nauts	2004-04-29^{JP}	Yes		
Taisen(1) Shogi	Mycom	Mycom	2004-03-25^{JP}	Yes		
Taisen(2) Igo	Mycom	Mycom	2004-03-25^{JP}	Yes		
Taisen(3) Mahjong	Mycom	Mycom	2004-03-25^{JP}	Yes		
Taisen(4) Soldier	Mycom	Mycom	2004-03-25^{JP}	Yes		
Taishou Mononoke Ibunroku	Gust Co. Ltd.	Gust Co. Ltd.	2003-02-27^{JP}	Yes		
Taito Legends	Empire Interactive	Empire Interactive^{EU}, Sega^{NA}, Taito^{KO}	2005-10-14^{EU}	Yes ^{KO}	Yes	Yes
Taito Legends 2	Empire Interactive	Empire Interactive^{PAL}, Destineer^{NA}	2006-03-30^{PAL}		Yes	Yes
Taito Memories Gekan	Taito	Taito	2005-08-25^{JP}	Yes		
Taito Memories II Gekan	Taito	Taito	2007-03-29^{JP}	Yes		
Taito Memories II Joukan	Taito	Taito	2005-07-28^{JP}	Yes		
Taito Memories Joukan	Taito	Taito	2007-01-25^{JP}	Yes		
Tak 2: The Staff of Dreams	Avalanche Software	THQ	2004-10-11^{NA}	Yes ^{KO}	Yes	Yes
Tak and the Guardians of Gross	Blitz Games	THQ	2008-10-13^{NA}		Yes	Yes
Tak and the Power of Juju	Avalanche Software	THQ	2003-10-15^{NA}	Yes ^{KO}	Yes	Yes
Tak: The Great Juju Challenge	Avalanche Software	THQ	2005-09-19^{NA}		Yes	Yes
Takahashi Naoko no Marathon Shiyouyo!	Taito	Taito	2003-11-13^{JP}	Yes		
The Tale of Despereaux	Brash Entertainment	Brash Entertainment	2008-12-02^{NA}			Yes
Tales of Destiny •Tales of Destiny: Director's Cut (different version)	Namco Tales Studio	Namco	2006-11-30^{JP}	Yes ^{JP, KO}		
Tales of Destiny 2	Telenet Japan, Wolfteam	Namco^{JP}, Sony Computer Entertainment^{KO}	2002-11-28^{JP}	Yes ^{JP, KO}		
Tales of Fandom Vol. 2	Namco Tales Studio	Bandai Namco Games	2007-06-28^{JP}	Yes		
Tales of Legendia	Namco Tales Studio	Namco^{AS, JP, NA}, Sony Computer Entertainment^{KO}	2005-08-25^{JP}	Yes ^{JP, KO}		Yes
Tales of Rebirth	Namco Tales Studio	Namco	2004-12-16^{JP}	Yes		
Tales of Symphonia	Namco Tales Studio	Namco	2004-09-22^{JP}	Yes ^{AS, JP}		
Tales of the Abyss	Namco Tales Studio	Namco	2005-12-15^{JP}	Yes ^{AS, JP}		Yes
Tam Tam Paradise	Global A	Global A	2001-08-09^{JP}	Yes		
Tamayura	Yeti	Yeti	2006-06-29^{JP}	Yes		
Tank Elite •Simple 2000 Series Vol. 32: The Sensha^{JP}	Vingt-et-un Systems	D3 Publisher^{JP}, Agetec^{EU}	2003-06-26^{JP}	Yes	Yes	
Tantei Gakuen Q	Konami	Konami	2003-12-18^{JP}	Yes		
Tantei Jinguuji Saburou: Innocent Black	WorkJam	WorkJam	2002-10-24^{JP}	Yes ^{JP, KO}		
Tantei Jinguuji Saburou: Kind of Blue	WorkJam	WorkJam	2004-04-22^{JP}	Yes ^{JP, KO}		
The Taxi 2 •Simple 2000 Series Vol. 109: The Taxi 2^{JP}	Tamsoft	D3 Publisher	2006-10-12^{JP}	Yes		
Taxi 3	Ubi Soft Montreal	Ubi Soft	2003-02-23^{EU}		Yes	
Taxi Rider •Simple 2000 Series Vol. 48: The Taxi: Utenshu wa Kimi da^{JP}	Tamsoft	D3 Publisher^{JP}, 505 Game Street^{EU}	2004-04-08^{JP}	Yes	Yes	
Taz Wanted	Blitz Games	Infogrames	2002-09-17^{NA}		Yes	Yes
TBS All-Star Kansha Matsuri 2003-Aki Chou Gouka! Quiz Ketteiban	Hudson Soft	Hudson Soft	2003-09-25^{JP}	Yes		
TearRing Saga Series: Berwick Saga	Enterbrain	Enterbrain	2005-05-26^{JP}	Yes		
Technicbeat	Arika	Arika, Mastiff	2002-11-07^{JP}	Yes		Yes
Technictix	Arika	Arika	2001-01-25^{JP}	Yes		
Tecmo Hit Parade	Tecmo	Tecmo	2004-11-25^{JP}	Yes		
Teen Titans	Artificial Mind and Movement	THQ	2006-05-24^{NA}		Yes	Yes
Teenage Mutant Ninja Turtles	Konami	Konami	2003-10-21^{NA}		Yes	Yes
Teenage Mutant Ninja Turtles 2: Battle Nexus	Konami	Konami	2004-10-19^{NA}		Yes	Yes
Teenage Mutant Ninja Turtles 3: Mutant Nightmare	Konami	Konami	2005-11-01^{NA}		Yes	Yes
Teenage Mutant Ninja Turtles: Mutant Melee	Konami	Konami	2005-10-14^{EU}		Yes	
Teenage Mutant Ninja Turtles: Smash-Up	Game Arts	Ubisoft	2009-09-22^{NA}		Yes	Yes
Teikoku Sensenki	Interchannel	Interchannel	2004-11-25^{JP}	Yes		
Teitoku no Ketsudan IV with Power-Up Kit (Note: update for P.T.O. IV: Pacific Theater of Operations.)	Koei	Koei	2004-02-26^{JP}	Yes		
Tekken 4	Namco	Namco^{JP, NA}, Sony Computer Entertainment^{EU}	2002-03-28^{JP}	Yes	Yes	Yes
Tekken 5	Namco	Namco	2005-02-24^{NA}	Yes	Yes	Yes
Tekken Tag Tournament	Namco	Namco^{JP, NA}, Sony Computer Entertainment^{EU}	2000-03-30^{JP}	Yes	Yes	Yes
Telly Addicts	Ubisoft	Ubisoft	2007-11-23^{EU}		Yes	
Tenchu: Fatal Shadows •Tenchu Kurenai^{AS, JP, KO}	K2 LLC	FromSoftware^{AS, JP, KO}, Sega^{EU, NA}	2004-07-22^{JP}	Yes ^{AS, JP, KO}	Yes	Yes
Tenchu: Wrath of Heaven •Tenchu San^{JP} •Tenchu 3: Wrath of Heaven^{KO}	K2 LLC	FromSoftware^{JP, KO}, Activision^{EU, NA}	2003-03-03^{NA}	Yes ^{JP, KO}	Yes	Yes
Tengai •Tengai Premium Package^{KO}	Psikyo	Taito	2005-07-29^{KO}	Yes ^{KO}	Yes	
Tengai Makyō II: Manji Maru	Hudson Soft	Hudson Soft	2003-10-02^{JP}	Yes		
Tengai Makyō III: Namida	Hudson Soft	Hudson Soft	2005-04-14^{JP}	Yes		
Tenka-bito	Shade	Sega	2006-03-02^{JP}	Yes		
Tenkuu Danzai Skelter Heaven	Design Factory	Idea Factory	2004-11-25^{JP}	Yes		
Tennis Court Smash •Simple 2000 Series Vol. 8: The Tennis^{JP}	HuneX	D3 Publisher^{JP}, Agetec^{EU}	2002-09-12^{JP}	Yes	Yes	
Tennis Masters Series 2003	Microids	Microids	2003-07-25^{EU}		Yes	
Tennis no Oji-Sama: Card Hunter	WinkySoft	Konami	2007-02-22^{JP}	Yes		
Tennis no Oji-Sama: DokiDoki Survival – Sanroku no Mystic	WinkySoft	Konami	2006-12-21^{JP}	Yes		
Tennis no Oji-Sama: DokiDoki Survival – Umibe no Secret	WinkySoft	Konami	2007-01-25^{JP}	Yes		
Tennis no Oji-Sama: Gakuensai no Oji-Sama	WinkySoft	Konami	2005-12-22^{JP}	Yes		
Tennis no Oji-Sama: Kiss of Prince Flame	WinkySoft	Konami	2003-10-30^{JP}	Yes		
Tennis no Oji-Sama: Kiss of Prince Ice	WinkySoft	Konami	2003-10-30^{JP}	Yes		
Tennis no Oji-Sama: Love of Prince Bitter	WinkySoft	Konami	2004-02-12^{JP}	Yes		
Tennis no Oji-Sama: Love of Prince Sweet	WinkySoft	Konami	2004-02-12^{JP}	Yes		
Tennis no Oji-Sama: Rush & Dream!	Konami	Konami	2004-12-09^{JP}	Yes		
Tennis no Oji-Sama: Saikyou Team o Kessei Seyo!	Konami	Konami	2004-09-16^{JP}	Yes		
Tennis no Oji-Sama: Smash Hit!	Konami	Konami	2003-07-24^{JP}	Yes		
Tennis no Oji-Sama: Smash Hit! 2	Konami	Konami	2003-12-18^{JP}	Yes		
Tennis no Oji-Sama: Sweat & Tears 2	Konami	Konami	2003-09-25^{JP}	Yes		
Tenohirao, Taiyouni: Eikyuu no Kizuna	PrincessSoft	PrincessSoft	2004-03-25^{JP}	Yes		
Tensai Bit-Kun: Gramon Battle	Tose	Taito	2003-09-18^{JP}	Yes		
Tensei Hakkenshi Fuumaroku	Vridge	Success	2006-06-08^{JP}	Yes		
Tenshi no Present - Marl Ōkoku Monogatari	Nippon Ichi Software	Nippon Ichi Software	2000-12-21^{JP}	Yes		
Tenshou Gakuen Gekkouroku	Asmik Ace	Asmik Ace	2006-11-22^{JP}	Yes		
Tenshou Gakuen Gensouroku	Asmik Ace	Asmik Ace	2004-05-27^{JP}	Yes		
Tentama: 1st Sunnyside	KID	KID	2003-10-30^{JP}	Yes		
Tentama 2: Wins	KID	KID	2004-02-26^{JP}	Yes		
Terminator 3: Rise of the Machines	Black Ops Entertainment	Atari	2003-11-11^{NA}	Yes	Yes	Yes
Terminator 3: The Redemption	Paradigm Entertainment	Atari	2004-09-02^{NA}	Yes	Yes	Yes
Terminator: Dawn of Fate	Paradigm Entertainment	Infogrames	2002-09-16^{NA}		Yes	Yes
Test Drive •TD Overdrive: The Brotherhood of Speed^{EU}	Pitbull Syndicate	Atari	2002-05-28^{NA}		Yes	Yes
Test Drive: Eve of Destruction •Driven to Destruction^{EU}	Monster Games	Atari	2004-09-07^{NA}		Yes	Yes
Test Drive Off-Road: Wide Open •Off-Road Wide Open^{EU}	Angel Studios	Infogrames	2001-08-24^{NA}		Yes	Yes
Test Drive Unlimited	Melbourne House	Atari	2007-03-16^{PAL}		Yes	Yes
Tetris: Kiwame Michi •SuperLite 2000 Puzzle: Tetris: Kiwame Michi^{EU}	Blue Planet Software	THQ	2003-12-18^{JP}	Yes		
Tetris Worlds	Blue Planet Software	THQ	2002-03-20^{NA}		Yes	Yes
Tetsu 1: Densha de Battle!	Vingt-et-un Systems	Syscom	2001-07-05^{JP}	Yes		
Tetsujin 28-go	Sandlot	Bandai	2004-07-01^{JP}	Yes		
Theme Park Roller Coaster •Theme Park World^{EU} •Theme Park 2001^{JP}	Bullfrog Productions	Electronic Arts	2000-12-04^{NA}	Yes	Yes	Yes
They Came from the Skies	Midas Interactive Entertainment	Midas Interactive Entertainment	2007-08-24^{EU}		Yes	
The Thing •Yuusei Kara no Buutai X: Episode II^{JP}	Computer Artworks	Black Label Games^{EU, NA}, Konami^{JP}	2002-08-20^{NA}	Yes	Yes	Yes
Thomas & Friends: A Day at the Races	Blast! Entertainment Ltd	Blast! Entertainment Ltd	2007-08-24^{EU}		Yes	
Thread Colors: Sayonara no Mukougawa	HuneX	D3 Publisher	2002-11-14^{JP}	Yes		
Thrillville	Frontier Developments	LucasArts^{NA}, Atari^{PAL}	2006-11-21^{NA}		Yes	Yes
Thrillville: Off the Rails	Frontier Developments	LucasArts	2007-10-09^{NA}	Yes ^{KO}	Yes	Yes
Thunder Force VI	Sega	Sega	2008-10-30^{JP}	Yes		
Thunderbirds	Pukka Games	Blast! Entertainment Ltd	2007-07-06^{EU}		Yes	
Thunderstrike: Operation Phoenix •Thunderhawk: Operation Phoenix^{EU}	Core Design	Eidos Interactive	2001-10-12^{EU}	Yes	Yes	Yes
Tiger Woods PGA Tour 06	EA Redwood Shores	EA Sports	2005-09-20^{NA}	Yes	Yes	Yes
Tiger Woods PGA Tour 07	EA Redwood Shores	EA Sports	2006-09-21^{PAL}	Yes	Yes	Yes
Tiger Woods PGA Tour 08	EA Tiburon	EA Sports	2007-08-28^{NA}		Yes	Yes
Tiger Woods PGA Tour 09	EA Tiburon	EA Sports	2008-08-26^{NA}		Yes	Yes
Tiger Woods PGA Tour 10	EA Tiburon	EA Sports	2009-06-08^{NA}		Yes	Yes
Tiger Woods PGA Tour 2001	EA Redwood Shores	EA Sports	2001-02-26^{NA}	Yes	Yes	Yes
Tiger Woods PGA Tour 2002	EA Redwood Shores	EA Sports	2002-02-24^{NA}	Yes	Yes	Yes
Tiger Woods PGA Tour 2003	EA Redwood Shores	EA Sports	2002-10-27^{NA}		Yes	Yes
Tiger Woods PGA Tour 2004	EA Redwood Shores	EA Sports	2003-09-22^{NA}	Yes ^{KO}	Yes	Yes
Tiger Woods PGA Tour 2005	EA Redwood Shores	EA Sports	2004-09-20^{NA}		Yes	Yes
Tim Burton's The Nightmare Before Christmas: Oogie's Revenge •Tim Burton's The Nightmare Before Christmas: Boogy no Gyakushuu^{JP}	Capcom	Capcom^{JP}, Buena Vista Games^{EU, NA}	2004-10-21^{JP}	Yes	Yes	Yes
Time Crisis 3	Nextech	Namco^{JP, NA}, Sony Computer Entertainment^{EU}	2003-10-21^{NA}	Yes	Yes	Yes
Time Crisis: Crisis Zone •Crisis Zone^{PAL}	Namco	Namco^{KO, NA}, Sony Computer Entertainment^{PAL}	2004-09-17^{PAL}	Yes ^{KO}	Yes	Yes
Time Crisis II	Namco	Namco^{JP, NA}, Sony Computer Entertainment^{EU}	2001-10-01^{NA}	Yes	Yes	Yes
TimeSplitters	Free Radical Design	Eidos Interactive	2000-10-26^{NA}		Yes	Yes
TimeSplitters 2 •TimeSplitter: Jikuu no Shinryakusha^{JP}	Free Radical Design	Eidos Interactive	2002-10-08^{NA}	Yes ^{JP, KO}	Yes	Yes
TimeSplitters: Future Perfect	Free Radical Design	EA Games	2005-03-21^{NA}		Yes	Yes
Tir Na Nog: Yuukyuu no Jin	SystemSoft	SystemSoft	2009-04-29^{JP}	Yes		
Titeuf: Mega Compet	Eden Studios	Atari	2004-09-24^{EU}		Yes	
TMNT	Ubisoft Montreal	Ubisoft	2007-03-20^{NA}		Yes	Yes
TNA Impact!	Midway Games	Midway Games	2008-09-09^{NA}		Yes	Yes
To Heart 2	Leaf	Aquaplus	2004-12-28^{JP}	Yes		
TOCA Race Driver 2 •DTM Race Driver 2^{GER} •V8 Supercars Australia 2^{AU}	Codemasters	Codemasters^{NA, PAL}, Interchannel^{JP}	2004-10-05^{NA}	Yes	Yes	Yes
TOCA Race Driver 3 •DTM Race Driver 3^{GER} •V8 Supercars 3^{AU}	Codemasters	Codemasters^{NA, PAL}, Interchannel^{JP}	2006-02-22^{NA}	Yes	Yes	Yes
Togainu no Chi: True Blood	Kadokawa Games	Kadokawa Games	2008-05-29^{JP}	Yes		
Tokimeki Memorial 2: Music Video Clips: Circus de Ai Imashou	Konami	Konami	2002-04-18^{JP}	Yes		
Tokimeki Memorial 3	Konami	Konami	2001-12-20^{JP}	Yes		
Tokimeki Memorial Girl's Side	Konami	Konami	2002-06-20^{JP}	Yes		
Tokimeki Memorial Girl's Side: 2nd Kiss	Konami	Konami	2006-08-03^{JP}	Yes		
Tokobot Plus: Mysteries of the Karakuri •Korobot Adventure^{JP}	Tecmo	Tecmo^{JP, NA}, Take-Two Interactive^{PAL}	2006-10-24^{NA}	Yes	Yes	Yes
The Tokudane •Simple 2000 Series Vol. 75: The Tokudane^{JP}	Tomcat System	D3 Publisher	2005-03-31^{JP}	Yes		
The Tokusatsu Henshin Hero^{JP}	Daft	D3 Publisher^{JP}	2004-09-02^{JP}	Yes		
Tokyo Bus Annai •SuperLite 2000: Tokyo Bus Annai^{JP}	Fortyfive	Success	2001-05-10^{JP}	Yes		
Tokyo Bus Annai 2 •SuperLite 2000: Tokyo Bus Annai 2^{JP}	Success	Success	2005-09-08^{JP}	Yes		
Tokyo Majin Gakuen: Kaihoujyou Kefurokou	Marvelous Entertainment	Marvelous Entertainment	2004-08-12^{JP}	Yes		
Tokyo Road Race •Battle Gear 2^{JP}	Taito	Taito^{JP}, Midas Interactive Entertainment^{EU}	2001-03-22^{JP}	Yes	Yes	
Tokyo Xtreme Racer: 3 •Shutokou Battle 01^{JP}	Genki	Genki^{JP}, Crave Entertainment^{NA}	2003-07-24^{JP}	Yes		Yes
Tokyo Xtreme Racer: Drift •Kaido Battle: Nikko, Haruna, Rokko, Hakone^{JP}	Genki	Genki^{JP}, Crave Entertainment^{NA}	2003-02-27^{JP}	Yes		Yes
Tokyo Xtreme Racer: Drift 2 •Kaido Racer 2^{PAL} •Kaido: Touge no Densetsu^{JP}	Genki	Genki^{JP}, Konami^{PAL}, Crave Entertainment^{NA}	2005-07-28^{JP}	Yes	Yes	Yes
Tokyo Xtreme Racer: Zero •Shutokou Battle 0^{JP} •Tokyo Xtreme Racer^{EU}	Genki	Genki^{JP}, Crave Entertainment^{EU, NA}	2001-03-15^{JP}	Yes	Yes	Yes
Tom and Jerry in War of Whiskers •Tom & Jerry: Hige Hige Daisensou^{JP}	VIS Entertainment	NewKidCo^{NA}, Ubisoft^{EU}, Success^{JP}	2002-10-22^{NA}	Yes	Yes	Yes
Tom Clancy's Ghost Recon	Red Storm Entertainment	Ubisoft	2002-12-01^{NA}	Yes	Yes	Yes
Tom Clancy's Ghost Recon 2	Red Storm Entertainment	Ubisoft	2004-11-26^{EU}	Yes	Yes	Yes
Tom Clancy's Ghost Recon Advanced Warfighter	Ubisoft Paris	Ubisoft	2006-03-28^{NA}	Yes	Yes	Yes
Tom Clancy's Ghost Recon: Jungle Storm (Note: stand-alone expansion for Tom Clancy's Ghost Recon.)	Red Storm Entertainment	Ubisoft	2004-03-12^{EU}	Yes	Yes	Yes
Tom Clancy's Rainbow Six 3	Ubisoft Shanghai	Ubisoft	2004-03-24^{NA}	Yes	Yes	Yes
Tom Clancy's Rainbow Six: Lockdown	Red Storm Entertainment	Ubisoft	2005-09-06^{NA}		Yes	Yes
Tom Clancy's Splinter Cell	Ubisoft Shanghai	Ubisoft	2003-03-28^{EU}	Yes ^{JP, KO}	Yes	Yes
Tom Clancy's Splinter Cell: Chaos Theory	Ubisoft Montreal	Ubisoft	2005-03-28^{NA}	Yes	Yes	Yes
Tom Clancy's Splinter Cell: Double Agent •Tom Clancy's Splinter Cell Nijuu Spy^{JP}	Ubisoft Montreal	Ubisoft	2006-10-24^{NA}	Yes	Yes	Yes
Tom Clancy's Splinter Cell: Pandora Tomorrow	Ubisoft Shanghai	Ubisoft	2004-06-11^{EU}	Yes	Yes	Yes
Tomak: Save the Earth •Tomak: Save the Earth – Complete Edition^{KO} (different version)	Seed9 Entertainment	Sunsoft	2002-12-19^{JP}	Yes		
Tomb Raider: Anniversary	Crystal Dynamics	Eidos Interactive	2007-06-01^{EU}	Yes	Yes	Yes
Tomb Raider: Legend	Crystal Dynamics	Eidos Interactive^{NA, PAL}, Spike^{JP}	2006-04-07^{EU}	Yes	Yes	Yes
Tomb Raider: The Angel of Darkness •Tomb Raider: Utsukushiki Toubousha^{JP}	Core Design	Eidos Interactive	2003-06-20^{NA}	Yes ^{JP, KO}	Yes	Yes
Tomb Raider: Underworld	Buzz Monkey Software	Eidos Interactive^{NA, PAL}, Spike^{JP}	2009-01-23^{EU}	Yes	Yes	Yes
Tomoyo After: It's a Wonderful Life – CS Edition	Key	Prototype	2007-01-25^{JP}	Yes		
Tony Hawk's American Wasteland	Neversoft	Activision	2005-10-18^{NA}		Yes	Yes
Tony Hawk's Downhill Jam	SuperVillain Studios	Activision	2007-05-08^{NA}		Yes	Yes
Tony Hawk's Pro Skater 3	Neversoft	Activision	2001-10-28^{NA}	Yes	Yes	Yes
Tony Hawk's Pro Skater 4	Neversoft	Activision	2002-10-23^{NA}	Yes	Yes	Yes
Tony Hawk's Project 8	Shaba Games	Activision	2006-11-07^{NA}		Yes	Yes
Tony Hawk's Proving Ground	Page 44 Studios	Activision	2007-10-15^{NA}		Yes	Yes
Tony Hawk's Underground	Neversoft	Activision	2003-10-27^{NA}		Yes	Yes
Tony Hawk's Underground 2	Neversoft	Activision	2004-10-04^{NA}		Yes	Yes
Top Angler •Real Bass Fishing: Top Angler^{JP}	SIMS	SIMS^{JP}, Xicat Interactive^{NA}, THQ^{EU}	2002-03-07^{JP}	Yes	Yes	Yes
Top Gear: Dare Devil	Papaya Studio	Kemco	2000-12-11^{NA}	Yes	Yes	Yes
Top Gun	Atomic Planet Entertainment	Blast! Entertainment	2007-10-05^{EU}		Yes	
Top Gun: Combat Zones •Top Gun: Ace of the Sky^{JP}	Titus Software	Titus Software	2001-10-21^{NA}	Yes	Yes	Yes
Top o Nerae! GunBuster	Shade	Bandai	2005-02-03^{JP}	Yes		
Top Spin	PAM Development	2K Sports	2005-09-26^{NA}		Yes	Yes
Top Trumps Adventures: Dogs and Dinosaurs	Ironstone Partners	Ubisoft	2007-10-12^{EU}		Yes	
Top Trumps Adventures: Horror and Predators	Ironstone Partners	Ubisoft	2007-10-12^{EU}		Yes	
Top Trumps: Doctor Who	Rockpool Games	Eidos Interactive	2008-05-16^{EU}		Yes	
Topai! Dramatic Mahjong •Simple 2000 Ultimate Series Vol. 14: Topai! Dramatic Mahjong^{JP}	Agenda	D3 Publisher	2003-12-11^{JP}	Yes		
Torakapuu! Dash!!	Pulltop	Well Made	2003-07-17^{JP}	Yes		
Tori no Hoshi: Aerial Planet	Nippon Ichi Software	Nippon Ichi Software	2008-02-28^{JP}	Yes		
Torikago no Mukougawa	Takuyo	Takuyo	2006-07-27^{JP}	Yes		
Torino 2006	49Games	2K Sports	2006-01-24^{NA}		Yes	Yes
Toro to Kyuujitsu	Sony Computer Entertainment	Sony Computer Entertainment	2001-11-29^{JP}	Yes		
Torrente 3: The Protector	Virtual Toys	Virgin Play	2006-02-01^{EU}		Yes	
Total Club Manager 2004 •Football Manager 2004^{EU} •LFP Manager 2004^{FR}	Budcat Creations	Electronic Arts	2003-12-12^{EU}		Yes	
Total Club Manager 2005 •Football Manager 2005^{EU} •LFP Manager 2005^{FR}	Budcat Creations	Electronic Arts	2004-10-29^{EU}		Yes	
Total Immersion Racing	Razorworks	Empire Interactive	2002-11-01^{EU}		Yes	Yes
Total Overdose: A Gunslinger's Tale in Mexico •Total Overdose^{EU}	Deadline Games	Eidos Interactive	2005-09-16^{EU}		Yes	Yes
Totally Spies! Totally Party	Mad Monkey	Ubisoft^{PAL}, Valcon Games^{NA}	2007-10-18^{AU}		Yes	Yes
The Toubou Prisoner •Simple 2000 Series Vol. 110: The Toubou Prisoner^{JP}	Tamsoft	D3 Publisher	2006-10-12^{JP}	Yes		
Toudai Shogi: Jouseki Dojo Kanketsuhen	Mycom	Mycom	2004-09-09^{JP}	Yes		
Toudai Shogi: Shikenbisha Dojo	Mycom	Mycom	2000-12-07^{JP}	Yes		
Tough: Dark Fight	Konami	Konami	2005-12-01^{JP}	Yes		
Touka Gettan: Koufuu no Ryouou	Root	Kadokawa Games	2009-10-01^{JP}	Yes		
Toukon Inoki Michi: Puzzle de Daa!	Matrix Software	Pacific Century Cyber Works	2002-12-19^{JP}	Yes		
Tourist Trophy	Polyphony Digital	Sony Computer Entertainment	2006-02-02^{JP}	Yes	Yes	Yes
The Tousou Highway 2: Road Warrior 2050 •Simple 2000 Series Vol. 112: The Tousou Highway 2: Road Warrior 2050^{JP}	Tamsoft	D3 Publisher	2006-12-28^{JP}	Yes		
Towa no Sakura	Vingt-et-un Systems	Idea Factory	2007-09-27^{JP}	Yes		
Toy Golf Extreme	Zoo Digital Publishing	Zoo Digital Publishing	2008-03-14^{EU}		Yes	
The Toys Room	Phoenix Games	Phoenix Games	2006^{EU}		Yes	
Train Kit for A-Ressha de Ikou 2001 (Note: expansion for A-Ressha de Ikou 2001.)	Artdink	Artdink	2001-07-26^{JP}	Yes		
Train Simulator + Densha de Go! Tokyo Kyuukouhen	Ongakukan	Ongakukan	2003-12-18^{JP}	Yes		
Train Simulator: Keisei – Toei – Keikyu	Ongakukan	Ongakukan	2005-08-25^{JP}	Yes		
Train Simulator: Kyuushuu Shinkansen	Ongakukan	Ongakukan	2005-09-28^{JP}	Yes		
Train Simulator Midousuji-Sen	Ongakukan	Ongakukan	2003-10-22^{JP}	Yes		
Transformers	Winkysoft	Takara	2003-10-30^{JP}	Yes		
Transformers	Melbourne House	Atari	2004-05-07^{EU}		Yes	Yes
Transformers: Revenge of the Fallen	Krome Studios	Activision	2009-06-23^{NA}	Yes ^{KO}	Yes	Yes
Transformers: The Game	Traveller's Tales	Activision	2007-06-26^{NA}	Yes ^{JP, KO}	Yes	Yes
Transworld Skateboarder	Phoenix Games	Phoenix Games	2007-01-26^{EU}		Yes	
Transworld Surf	Rockstar San Diego	Infogrames	2002-04-30^{NA}		Yes	Yes
Trapt •Kagero 2: Dark Illusion^{JP}	Tecmo	Tecmo^{JP, NA}, Take-Two Interactive^{EU}	2005-06-30^{JP}	Yes	Yes	Yes
Triangle Again	KiKi Co., Ltd.	MIG Entertainment	2003-01-09^{JP}	Yes		
Triangle Again 2	KiKi Co., Ltd.	MIG Entertainment	2003-06-26^{JP}	Yes		
Tribes: Aerial Assault	Inevitable Entertainment	Sierra Entertainment	2002-09-23^{NA}			Yes
Trigger Man	Point of View	Crave Entertainment^{NA}, Play It!^{EU}	2004-10-05^{NA}		Yes	Yes
Triggerheart Exelica Enhanced	Alchemist	Alchemist	2009-03-26^{JP}	Yes		
Triple Play 2002	Pandemic Studios	Electronic Arts	2002-03-11^{NA}	Yes		Yes
Triple Play Baseball	EA Sports	EA Sports	2001-03-12^{NA}			Yes
Trivial Pursuit	EA Bright Light	Electronic Arts	2009-03-10^{NA}		Yes	Yes
Trivial Pursuit: Unhinged •Trivial Pursuit: Unlimited^{EU}	Artech Studios	Atari	2004-03-24^{NA}		Yes	Yes
Trouble Fortune Company * Happy Cure	Primavera	Primavera	2007-01-25^{JP}	Yes		
Truck Kyousokyoku	Namco, Metro	Metro	2000-12-14^{JP}	Yes		
Truck Racer	Brain in a Jar	Nordic Games	2009-06-25^{EU}		Yes	
Truck Racing 2	Brain in a Jar	Midas Interactive Entertainment	2005-10-28^{EU}		Yes	
True Crime: New York City	Luxoflux	Activision^{EU, NA}, Spike^{JP}	2005-11-15^{NA}	Yes	Yes	Yes
True Crime: Streets of LA	Luxoflux	Activision^{EU, NA}, Capcom^{JP}	2003-11-03^{NA}	Yes	Yes	Yes
True Fortune	Enterbrain	Enterbrain	2008-09-25^{JP}	Yes		
True Love Story 3	Enterbrain	Enterbrain	2001-04-05^{JP}	Yes		
True Love Story: Summer Days, and Yet...	Enterbrain	Enterbrain	2003-07-24^{JP}	Yes		
True Tears	La'cryma	Sweets	2008-08-07^{JP}	Yes		
Tsugunai: Atonement •Tsugunai^{JP}	Cattle Call	Sony Computer Entertainment^{JP}, Atlus^{NA}	2001-02-22^{JP}	Yes		Yes
Tsuki no Hikari: Shizumeru Kane no Satsujin	Open Sesame	Victor Interactive Software	2002-05-23^{JP}	Yes		
Tsuki wa Higashi ni Hi wa Nishi ni: Operation Sanctuary	August	Alchemist	2004-10-07^{JP}	Yes		
Tsuki wa Kirisaku	Idea Factory	Idea Factory	2005-02-24^{JP}	Yes		
Tsuyo Kiss 2 Gakki: Swift Love	Revolution	Revolution	2009-07-30^{JP}	Yes		
Tsuyo Kiss: Mighty Heart	PrincessSoft	PrincessSoft	2006-05-25^{JP}	Yes		
TT Superbikes Legends	Jester Interactive	Jester Interactive	2008-11-28^{EU}		Yes	
Turbo Trucks	Phoenix Games	Phoenix Games	2006^{EU}		Yes	
Turok: Evolution	Acclaim Studios Austin	Acclaim Entertainment	2002-08-28^{NA}		Yes	Yes
TVDJ (Note: rhythm game based on editing video clips.)	Sony Computer Entertainment	Sony Computer Entertainment	2000-06-29^{JP}	Yes		
Twenty 2 Party •Simple 2000 Series Vol. 18: The Party Sugoroku^{JP}	Japan Art Media	D3 Publisher^{JP}, 505 Game Street^{EU}	2002-12-19^{JP}	Yes	Yes	
Twin Caliber	Rage Software	Rage Software	2002-11-01^{EU}	Yes ^{KO}	Yes	
Twinkle Star Sprites: La Petite Princesse	SNK Playmore	SNK Playmore	2005-07-28^{JP}	Yes		
Twisted Metal: Black	Incognito Entertainment	Sony Computer Entertainment	2001-06-18^{NA}		Yes	Yes
Twisted Metal: Black Online	Incognito Entertainment	Sony Computer Entertainment	2002-08-27^{NA}		Yes	Yes
Twisted Metal: Head-On – Extra Twisted Edition	Eat Sleep Play	Sony Computer Entertainment	2008-02-05^{NA}			Yes
Ty the Tasmanian Tiger	Krome Studios	Electronic Arts	2002-10-09^{NA}		Yes	Yes
Ty the Tasmanian Tiger 2: Bush Rescue	Krome Studios	Electronic Arts	2004-10-12^{NA}		Yes	Yes
Ty the Tasmanian Tiger 3: Night of the Quinkan	Krome Studios	Activision	2005-10-12^{NA}		Yes ^{AU}	Yes
Typing Kengo: Musashi no Ken	Racjin	Sunsoft	2002-01-17^{JP}	Yes		
The Typing of the Dead: Zombie Panic	Sega	Sega	2004-12-22^{JP}	Yes		
Typing Renai Hakusho: Boys Be...	Racjin	Sunsoft	2002-03-14^{JP}	Yes		
Uchu-jintte Naani?	Taito	Taito	2001-09-27^{JP}	Yes		
Uchuu Keiji Tamashii: The Space Sheriff Spirits	Digifloyd	Bandai	2006-05-25^{JP}	Yes		
Uchuu no Stellvia	Digifloyd	Bandai	2004-01-22^{JP}	Yes		
Uchuu Senkan Yamato: Ankoku Seidan Teikoku no Gyakushuu	Bandai	Bandai	2005-01-27^{JP}	Yes		
Uchuu Senkan Yamato: Iscandar he no Tsuioku	Bandai	Bandai	2004-10-06^{JP}	Yes		
Uchuu Senkan Yamato: Nijuu Ginga no Houkai	Bandai	Bandai	2005-04-07^{JP}	Yes		
The Uchuujin to Hanashi Sou! •Simple 2000 Series Vol. 59: The Uchuujin to Hanashi Sou!^{JP}	Taito	D3 Publisher	2004-08-26^{JP}	Yes		
UEFA Challenge	Infogrames	Infogrames	2001-06-29^{EU}		Yes	
UEFA Champions League 2004–2005	EA Canada	EA Sports	2005-02-04^{EU}		Yes	
UEFA Champions League 2006–2007	EA Canada	EA Sports	2007-03-20^{NA}	Yes ^{KO}	Yes	Yes
UEFA Champions League Season 2001/2002	Silicon Dreams	Take-Two Interactive	2002-02-01^{EU}		Yes	
UEFA Euro 2004	EA Canada	EA Sports	2004-05-04^{NA}	Yes ^{KO}	Yes	Yes
UEFA Euro 2008: Austria-Switzerland	EA Canada	EA Sports	2008-04-17^{PAL}		Yes	Yes
Ueki no Housoku: Taosu ze Robert Juudan!!	Bandai	Bandai	2006-01-26^{JP}	Yes		
UFC: Sudden Impact'' •UFC 2004^{JP}	Opus	Global Star Software^{NA}, Marvelous Entertainment^{JP}	2004-04-21^{NA}	Yes	Yes	Yes
UFC: Throwdown	Crave Entertainment	Crave Entertainment^{KO, NA}, Capcom^{JP}, Ubisoft^{EU}	2002-06-03^{NA}	Yes ^{JP, KO}	Yes	Yes
Ultimate Beach Soccer	Pam Development	DreamCatcher Interactive^{NA}, Wanadoo Edition^{EU}	2003-08-29^{EU}		Yes	
Ultimate Board Game Collection	Jack of All Games	Valcon Games^{NA}, Empire Interactive^{EU}	2006-07-11^{NA}		Yes	Yes
Ultimate Casino •Simple 2000 Honkaku Shikou Series Vol. 6: The Card^{JP}	Amedio	D3 Publisher^{JP}, 505 Game Street^{EU}	2003-11-06^{JP}	Yes	Yes	
Ultimate Mind Games •Simple 2000 Series Vol. 10: The Table Game Sekaihen^{JP}	Yuki	D3 Publisher^{JP}, Midas Interactive Entertainment^{EU}	2002-09-12^{JP}	Yes	Yes	
The Ultimate Music Quiz	Oxygen Games	Liquid Games	2005-10-14^{EU}		Yes	
Ultimate Pro Pinball	Atomic Planet Entertainment	Xplosiv^{EU}, Taito^{JP}	2005-07-22^{EU}	Yes	Yes	
Ultimate Spider-Man	Treyarch	Activision^{NA, PAL}, Taito^{JP}	2005-09-22^{NA}	Yes	Yes	Yes
The Ultimate Sport Quiz	Oxygen Games	Liquid Games	2005^{EU}		Yes	
The Ultimate Trivia Quiz	Oxygen Games	Liquid Games	2006-02-24^{EU}		Yes	
The Ultimate TV & Film Quiz	Oxygen Games	Liquid Games	2005^{EU}		Yes	
The Ultimate World Cup Quiz	Oxygen Games	Liquid Games	2006-05-12^{EU}		Yes	
Ultraman	KAZe	Bandai	2004-05-20^{JP}	Yes		
Ultraman Fighting Evolution 2	Banpresto	Banpresto	2002-10-31^{JP}	Yes		
Ultraman Fighting Evolution 3	Banpresto	Banpresto	2004-12-02^{JP}	Yes		
Ultraman Fighting Evolution Rebirth	Banpresto	Banpresto	2005-10-27^{JP}	Yes		
Ultraman Nexus	Bandai	Bandai	2005-05-26^{JP}	Yes		
Umisho	5pb	5gk	2007-11-22^{JP}	Yes		
U-Move Super Sports	Konami	Konami	2004-07-15^{JP}	Yes		
Under the Moon: Crescent	Sugar Beans	Dimple Entertainment	2009-06-25^{JP}	Yes		
Under the Skin •Meiwaku Seijin: Panic Maker^{JP}	Capcom	Capcom	2004-08-05^{JP}	Yes	Yes	Yes
Underworld: The Eternal War	Lucky Chicken Games	Play it!	2004-01-09^{EU}		Yes	
Unison: Rebels of Rhythm & Dance	Tecmo	Tecmo	2000-11-30^{JP}	Yes		Yes
Unlimited SaGa	SquareSoft	SquareSoft^{JP}, Square Enix^{NA}, Atari^{EU}	2002-12-19^{JP}	Yes	Yes	Yes
Uno •SuperLite 2000 Table: Uno^{JP}	Success	Success	2004-03-11^{JP}	Yes		
The Unou Drill •Simple 2000 Series Vol. 93: The Unou Drill^{JP}	Luxe	Success	2006-03-09^{JP}	Yes		
Unreal Tournament	Epic Games, Digital Extremes	Infogrames	2000-10-26^{NA}		Yes	Yes
Up	Asobo Studio	THQ	2009-05-26^{NA}		Yes	Yes
Uragiri wa Boku no Namae o Shitteiru	Kadokawa Games	Kadokawa Games	2010-10-28^{JP}	Yes		
Urawaza Ikasa Mahjong Machi •Simple 2000 Ultimate Series Vol. 4: Urawaza Ikasa Mahjong Machi^{JP}	Agenda	D3 Publisher	2002-10-24^{JP}	Yes		
Urban Chaos: Riot Response	Rocksteady Studios	Eidos Interactive^{EU, NA}, Spike^{JP}	2006-05-19^{EU}	Yes	Yes	Yes
Urban Constructor	Phoenix Games	Phoenix Games	2005-09-30^{EU}		Yes	
Urban Extreme	Data Design Interactive	Metro3D	2006-06-23^{EU}		Yes	
Urban Freestyle Soccer	Silicon Dreams	Acclaim Entertainment	2004-02-13^{EU}		Yes	
Urban Reign	Namco	Namco	2005-09-13^{NA}	Yes ^{JP, KO}	Yes	Yes
The Urbz: Sims in the City	Maxis	Electronic Arts	2004-11-09^{NA}	Yes	Yes	Yes
Ururun Quest: Koiyuuki •Simple 2000 Ultimate Series Vol. 33: Ururun Quest: Koiyuuki^{JP}	Vingt-et-un Systems	D3 Publisher	2005-07-28^{JP}	Yes		
US Open 2002	Strategy First	Taito	2003-02-06^{JP}	Yes		
USA Racer	Davilex Games	Davilex Games	2002-06-14^{EU}		Yes	
Usagi: Yasei no Topai	DigiCube	DigiCube	2002-06-27^{JP}	Yes		
Usagi: Yasei no Topai – The Arcade	DigiCube	DigiCube	2003-03-27^{JP}	Yes		
Usagi: Yasei no Topai – Yamashiro Mahjong-Hen	Sammy	Sammy	2003-11-27^{JP}	Yes		
Usagi: Yasei no Topai The Arcade – Yamashiro Mahjong-Hen	Warashi	Taito	2004-09-16^{JP}	Yes		
Utau * Tumbling Dice	Ecole	Reindeer	2004-08-26^{JP}	Yes		
Utawarerumono: Chiriyukusha e no Komoriuta	Sting Entertainment	Aquaplus	2006-10-26^{JP}	Yes		
Valkyrie Profile 2: Silmeria	tri-Ace	Square Enix	2006-06-22^{JP, KO}	Yes ^{JP, KO}	Yes	Yes
Vampire: Darkstalkers Collection	Capcom	Capcom	2005-05-19^{JP}	Yes		
Vampire Night	Wow Entertainment	Namco^{JP, NA}, Sony Computer Entertainment^{EU}	2001-11-14^{NA}	Yes	Yes	Yes
Vampire Panic	Alfa System	Sammy	2004-06-24^{JP}	Yes		
Van Helsing	Saffire	Vivendi Universal Games	2004-05-06^{NA}	Yes	Yes	Yes
Vegas Casino 2	Phoenix Games	Phoenix Games	2005-03-25^{EU}		Yes	
Velvet File Plus (Note: update for Robot Warlords.)	SETA Corporation	SETA Corporation	2001-03-29^{JP}	Yes		
Venus & Braves: Majo to Megami to Horobi no Yogen	Namco	Namco	2003-02-13^{JP}	Yes		
Vexx	Acclaim Studios Austin	Acclaim Entertainment	2003-02-11^{NA}	Yes ^{KO}	Yes	Yes
Vib-Ripple	NanaOn-Sha	Sony Computer Entertainment	2004-05-27^{JP}	Yes		
Victorious Boxers 2 •Hajime no Ippo All Stars^{JP}	Grandprix Inc.	ESP Software^{JP}, Empire Interactive^{EU, NA}	2004-12-28^{JP}	Yes	Yes	Yes
Victorious Boxers: Ippo's Road to Glory •Hajime no Ippo: Victorious Boxers^{JP}	New Corporation	ESP Software^{JP}, Empire Interactive^{EU, NA}	2000-12-14^{JP}	Yes	Yes	Yes
Victory Wings: Zero Pilot Series	Opera House	Sammy	2004-12-09^{JP}	Yes		
Video Poker & Blackjack	System 3	Play It!	2004-11-26^{EU}		Yes	
Vietcong Purple Haze	Coyote Games	Gathering of Developers	2004-09-15^{NA}		Yes	Yes
Vietnam: The Tet Offensive	Atomic Planet Entertainment	Oxygen Games	2005-03-25^{EU}		Yes	
Viewtiful Joe •Viewtiful Joe: Arata naru Kibou^{JP}	Clover Studio	Capcom	2004-08-24^{NA}	Yes ^{JP, KO}	Yes	Yes
Viewtiful Joe 2 •Viewtiful Joe 2: Black Film no Nazo^{JP}	Clover Studio	Capcom	2004-12-07^{NA}	Yes	Yes	Yes
Viorate no Atelier: Gramnad no Renkinjutsushi 2	Gust	Gust	2003-06-26^{JP}	Yes		
V.I.P.	Ubisoft	Ubisoft	2002-08-30^{EU}		Yes	
Virtua Cop: Elite Edition •Virtua Cop Re-Birth^{JP}	Sega-AM2	Sega^{JP}, Acclaim Entertainment^{EU}	2002-08-15^{JP}	Yes	Yes	
Virtua Fighter: 10th Anniversary	Sega-AM2	Enterbrain	2003-11-28^{JP}	Yes		
Virtua Fighter 4	Sega-AM2	Sega^{JP, NA}, Sony Computer Entertainment^{EU}	2002-01-31^{JP}	Yes	Yes	Yes
Virtua Fighter 4: Evolution (Note: update for Virtua Fighter 4.)	Sega-AM2	Sega	2003-03-13^{JP}	Yes ^{JP, KO}	Yes	Yes
Virtua Pro Football •World Football Climax^{JP}	Sega	Sega	2006-06-01^{JP}	Yes	Yes	
Virtua Quest •Virtua Fighter Cyber Generation: Judgment Six No Yabou^{JP}	Sega-AM2	Sega	2004-08-26^{JP}	Yes		Yes
Vitamin X	HuneX	D3 Publisher	2007-03-29^{JP}	Yes		
Vitamin Z	HuneX	D3 Publisher	2009-03-26^{JP}	Yes		
VM Japan	Falcom	Asmik Ace	2005-02-03^{JP}	Yes		
Volleyball Challenge •Simple 2000 Series Vol. 41: The Volleyball^{JP}	D3 Publisher	D3 Publisher^{JP}, 505 Game Street^{EU}	2003-11-20^{JP}		Yes	
Volleyball Xciting •Waku Waku Volley 2^{JP}	Success	Success^{JP}, Agetec^{EU}	2003-01-30^{JP}	Yes	Yes	
V-Rally 3	Eden Studios	Infogrames	2002-06-21^{EU}	Yes	Yes	Yes
W Wish	PrincessSoft	PrincessSoft	2004-09-30^{JP}	Yes		
Wacky Races: Mad Motors	Blast! Entertainment	Blast! Entertainment	2007-06-21^{PAL}		Yes	
Wacky Races: Starring Dastardly and Muttley	Infogrames	Infogrames	2001-06-29^{EU}		Yes	
Wacky Zoo GP	Phoenix Games	Phoenix Games	2007^{EU}		Yes	
Waga Ryū o Miyo: Pride of the Dragon Peace	Sony Computer Entertainment	Sony Computer Entertainment	2004-10-28^{JP}	Yes		
Wakeboarding Unleashed Featuring Shaun Murray	Shaba Games	Activision	2003-06-10^{NA}		Yes	Yes
Wallace & Gromit in Project Zoo	Frontier Developments	BAM! Entertainment	2003-10-03^{EU}		Yes	Yes
Wallace & Gromit: The Curse of the Were-Rabbit •Wallace to Gromit: Yasaibatake de Dai-Pinch!^{JP}	Frontier Developments	Konami	2005-09-29^{NA}	Yes	Yes	Yes
WALL-E	Asobo Studio	THQ	2008-06-24^{NA}		Yes	Yes
Walt Disney's The Jungle Book: Rhythm N'Groove •Walt Disney's The Jungle Book: Groove Party^{EU}	Ubisoft Shanghai	Buena Vista Games	2003-02-04^{NA}		Yes	Yes
Wand of Fortune	Idea Factory	Idea Factory	2009-06-25^{JP}	Yes		
Wand of Fortune: Mirai e no Prologue (Note: stand-alone expansion for Wand of Fortune.)	Idea Factory	Idea Factory	2010-02-25^{JP}	Yes		
Wandaba Style: Totsugeki! Mix Nama Juice •Simple 2000 Ultimate Series Vol. 11: Wandaba Style – Totsugeki! Mix Ki Juice^{JP}	HuneX	D3 Publisher	2003-08-28^{JP}	Yes		
Wangan Midnight	Genki	Genki	2002-03-28^{JP}	Yes		
War of the Monsters •Kaijuu Daigekisen: War of the Monsters^{JP}	Incognito Entertainment	Sony Computer Entertainment^{EU, NA}, Capcom^{JP}	2003-01-14^{NA}	Yes	Yes	Yes
WarChess	XS Games	XS Games	2005-01-01^{EU}		Yes	
Warhammer 40,000: Fire Warrior	Kuju Entertainment	THQ	2003-09-26^{EU}		Yes	Yes
WarJetz •World Destruction League: WarJetz^{EU}	3DO	3DO	2001-06-27^{NA}		Yes	Yes
The Warriors	Rockstar Toronto	Rockstar Games	2005-10-17^{NA}		Yes	Yes
Warriors of Might and Magic	3DO	3DO^{EU, NA}, Success^{JP}	2001-03-17^{NA}	Yes	Yes	Yes
Warriors Orochi •Musou Orochi^{JP, KO}	Omega Force	Koei	2007-03-21^{JP}	Yes ^{JP, KO}	Yes	Yes
Warriors Orochi 2 •Musou Orochi: Maou Sairin^{JP}	Omega Force	Koei	2008-04-03^{JP}	Yes	Yes	Yes
Warship Gunner 2 •Warship Gunner 2: Koutetsu no Houkou^{JP}	Micro Cabin	Koei	2006-02-23^{JP}	Yes		Yes
The Waterhorse: Legend of the Deep	Atomic Planet Entertainment	Blast! Entertainment	2008-03-14^{EU}		Yes	
Wave Rally	Opus	Eidos Interactive	2001-11-26^{NA}	Yes	Yes	Yes
Way of the Samurai •Samurai^{JP, KO}	Acquire	Spike^{JP, KO}, BAM! Entertainment^{NA}, Eidos Interactive^{EU}	2002-02-07^{JP}	Yes ^{JP, KO}	Yes	Yes
Way of the Samurai 2 •Samurai Dou 2: Way of the Samurai 2^{JP}	Acquire	Spike^{JP, KO}, Capcom^{EU, NA}	2003-10-09^{JP}	Yes	Yes	Yes
We Love Katamari •Minna Daisuki Katamari Damacy^{JP}	Namco	Namco^{JP, NA}, Sony Computer Entertainment^{KO}, Electronic Arts^{EU}	2005-07-07^{JP}	Yes ^{JP, KO}	Yes	Yes
The Weakest Link	Traveller's Tales	Activision	2001-11-02^{EU}		Yes	
WeAre*	KID	KID	2006-07-27^{JP}	Yes		
Welcome to Universal Studios Japan	Konami	Konami	2003-09-18^{JP}	Yes		
Wheel of Fortune	Artech Studios	Atari	2003-11-11^{NA}			Yes
Whiplash	Crystal Dynamics	Eidos Interactive	2003-11-18^{NA}		Yes	Yes
Whirl Tour	Papaya Studio	Crave Entertainment^{NA}, Vivendi Universal Games^{EU}	2002-11-25^{NA}		Yes	Yes
White Breath: Kizuna	KID	KID	2006-11-22^{JP}	Yes		
White Clarity: And, the Tears Became You	PrincessSoft	PrincessSoft	2005-12-29^{JP}	Yes		
White Princess the Second	KID	KID	2005-08-25^{JP}	Yes		
White Van Racer	Phoenix Games	Phoenix Games	2007-02-09^{EU}		Yes	
Whiteout	Vicarious Visions	Konami	2002-11-24^{NA}		Yes	Yes
Who Wants to Be a Millionaire 2nd Edition	Climax Solent	Eidos Interactive	2001-12-07^{EU}		Yes	
Who Wants To Be A Millionaire: Party Edition	Climax Solent	Eidos Interactive	2006-11-24^{EU}		Yes	
Wild Arms 3 •Wild Arms Advanced 3rd^{JP}	Media Vision	Sony Computer Entertainment^{JP, NA}, Ubisoft^{EU}	2002-03-14^{JP}	Yes	Yes	Yes
Wild Arms 4 •Wild Arms: The 4th Detonator^{JP}	Media Vision	Sony Computer Entertainment^{JP}, Xseed Games^{NA}, 505 Game Street^{EU}	2005-03-24^{JP}	Yes	Yes	Yes
Wild Arms 5 •Wild Arms: The Vth Vanguard^{JP}	Media Vision	Sony Computer Entertainment^{JP}, Xseed Games^{NA}, 505 Game Street^{EU}	2006-12-14^{JP}	Yes	Yes	Yes
Wild Arms Alter Code: F	Media Vision	Sony Computer Entertainment^{JP}, Agetec^{NA}	2003-11-27^{JP}	Yes		Yes
Wild Water Adrenaline featuring Salomon •River Ride Adventure featuring Salomon^{JP}	Indie Games	Nobilis^{EU}, Red Entertainment^{JP}	2006-03-03^{EU}	Yes	Yes	
Wild Wild Racing	Rage Software	Interplay Entertainment^{EU, NA}, Imagineer^{JP}	2000-09-14^{JP}	Yes	Yes	Yes
Will O' Wisp	Idea Factory	Idea Factory	2007-09-06^{JP}	Yes		
Will O' Wisp: Easter no Kiseki (Note: stand-alone expansion for Will O' Wisp.)	Idea Factory	Idea Factory	2008-10-09^{JP}	Yes		
WinBack 2: Project Poseidon •Operation WinBack 2: Project Poseidon^{JP}	Cavia	Koei	2006-04-25^{NA}	Yes ^{JP, KO}	Yes	Yes
WinBack: Covert Operations •Winback^{JP} •Operation WinBack^{EU}	Omega Force	Koei^{JP, NA}, Midas Interactive Entertainment^{EU}	2000-12-21^{JP}	Yes	Yes	Yes
Wind: A Breath of Heart	HuneX	Alchemist	2003-12-18^{JP}	Yes		
Winning Eleven: Pro Evolution Soccer 2007 •World Soccer Winning Eleven 10^{JP, KO} •Pro Evolution Soccer 6^{PAL}	Konami	Konami	2006-04-27^{JP}	Yes ^{JP, KO}	Yes	Yes
Winning Eleven Tactics: European Club Soccer	Konami	Konami	2004-12-09^{JP}	Yes		
Winning Post 4 Maximum	Koei	Koei	2000-09-28^{JP}	Yes		
Winning Post 4 Maximum 2001 (Note: update for Winning Post 4 Maximum.)	Koei	Koei	2001-03-22^{JP}	Yes		
Winning Post 5	Koei	Koei	2001-12-22^{JP}	Yes		
Winning Post 5 Maximum 2002 (Note: update for Winning Post 5.)	Koei	Koei	2002-09-19^{JP}	Yes		
Winning Post 5 Maximum 2003 (Note: update for Winning Post 5.)	Koei	Koei	2003-05-29^{JP}	Yes		
Winning Post 6	Koei	Koei	2003-08-28^{JP}	Yes		
Winning Post 6: 2005 Nendoban (Note: update for Winning Post 6.)	Koei	Koei	2005-02-24^{JP}	Yes		
Winning Post 6 Maximum 2004 (Note: update for Winning Post 6.)	Koei	Koei	2004-05-20^{JP}	Yes		
Winning Post 7	Koei	Koei	2005-08-25^{JP}	Yes		
Winning Post 7 Maximum 2006 (Note: update for Winning Post 7.)	Koei	Koei	2006-03-16^{JP}	Yes		
Winning Post 7 Maximum 2007 (Note: update for Winning Post 7.)	Koei	Koei	2007-03-29^{JP}	Yes		
Winning Post 7 Maximum 2008 (Note: update for Winning Post 7.)	Koei	Koei	2008-03-13^{JP}	Yes		
Winning Post Kouryaku Box	Koei	Koei	2004-06-24^{JP}	Yes		
Winning Post World	Koei	Koei	2009-04-02^{JP}	Yes		
Winning Post World 2010 (Note: update for Winning Post World.)	Koei	Koei	2010-04-02^{JP}	Yes		
Winter Sports	Oxygen Games	Oxygen Games	2006-02-09^{EU}		Yes	
Winter Sports 2: The Next Challenge • RTL Winter Sports 2009 The Next Challenge	49 Games	Conspiracy Entertainment^{NA}, RTL^{EU}	2008-11-18^{NA}		Yes	Yes
Winter Sports 2008: The Ultimate Challenge	49 Games	Conspiracy Entertainment^{NA}, RTL^{EU}	2007-11-30^{NA}		Yes	Yes
Winx Club	Konami	Konami	2006-03-17^{EU}		Yes	
Wipeout Fusion	Studio Liverpool	Sony Computer Entertainment^{EU}, BAM! Entertainment^{NA}	2002-02-08^{EU}		Yes	Yes
Wipeout Pulse	Studio Liverpool	Sony Computer Entertainment	2009-06-19^{EU}		Yes	
Without Warning	Circle Studio	Capcom	2005-10-28^{EU}		Yes	Yes
Wizardry Empire III: Haoh no Keifu	Starfish SD	Starfish SD	2003-12-25^{JP}	Yes		
Wizardry Gaiden: Sentou no Kangoku	Taito	Taito	2006-08-03^{JP}	Yes		
Wizardry Summoner	Taito	Taito	2005-04-21^{JP}	Yes		
Wizardry: Tale of the Forsaken Land •Busin: Wizardry Alternative^{JP}	Racjin	Atlus^{JP, NA}, Ubisoft^{EU}	2001-11-15^{JP}	Yes	Yes	Yes
Wizardry Xth 2: Unlimited Students – Mugen no Gakuto	MichaelSoft	MichaelSoft	2006-03-23^{JP}	Yes		
Wizardry Xth: Academy of Frontier – Zensen no Gakufu	MichaelSoft	MichaelSoft	2005-02-24^{JP}	Yes		
Women's Volleyball Championship •FIVB Volleyball World Cup: Venus Evolution^{JP}	Spike	Spike^{JP}, Agetec Inc.^{NA}	2007-10-25^{JP}	Yes		Yes
Wonder Zone (Note: includes a rhythm mini-game alongside music-video content.)	Sony Music Entertainment	Sony Music Entertainment	2002-10-10^{JP}	Yes		
Woody Woodpecker: Escape from Buzz Buzzard Park	EKO Software	Cryo Interactive^{EU}, Dreamcatcher Interactive^{NA}	2001-12-07^{EU}	Yes ^{KO}	Yes	Yes
wordimagesoundplay Tomato (Note: includes interactive mini-games.)	Sony Music Entertainment	Sony Music Entertainment	2004-03-10^{JP}	Yes		
World Championship Cards	Point of View	Crave Entertainment	2008-04-08^{NA}			Yes
World Championship Paintball	Coresoft	THQ	2008-01-07^{NA}			Yes
World Championship Poker	Coresoft	Crave Entertainment^{NA}, Play It!^{EU}	2004-11-18^{NA}		Yes	Yes
World Championship Poker 2: Featuring Howard Lederer	Point of View	Crave Entertainment^{NA}, Oxygen Games^{EU}	2005-11-08^{NA}		Yes	Yes
World Championship Poker: Featuring Howard Lederer – All In	Point of View	Crave Entertainment^{NA}, Oxygen Games^{EU}	2006-08-29^{NA}		Yes	Yes
World Championship Pool 2004	Blade Interactive	Jaleco Entertainment	2004-04-27^{NA}		Yes	Yes
World Championship Rugby	Swordfish Studios	Acclaim Entertainment	2004-04^{EU}		Yes	
World Championship Snooker 2002	Blade Interactive	Codemasters	2001-09-28^{EU}		Yes	
World Championship Snooker 2003	Blade Interactive	Codemasters	2003-06-27^{EU}		Yes	
World Championship Snooker 2004	Blade Interactive	Codemasters	2004-06-25^{EU}		Yes	
World Destruction League: Thunder Tanks	3DO	3DO	2000-12-20^{NA}		Yes	Yes
World Fantasista	SquareSoft	SquareSoft	2002-06-06^{JP}	Yes		
World Fighting •Simple 2000 Series Vol. 42: The Ishu Kakutou Waza^{JP}	HuneX	D3 Publisher^{JP}, 505 Game Street^{EU}	2003-12-18^{JP}	Yes	Yes	
World Heroes Anthology •World Heroes Gorgeous^{JP}	SNK Playmore	SNK Playmore^{JP, NA}, Ignition Entertainment^{PAL}	2007-10-18^{JP}	Yes	Yes	Yes
World of Outlaws: Sprint Cars 2002	Ratbag Games	Infogrames^{NA}, Ignition Entertainment^{EU}	2002-03-26^{NA}		Yes	Yes
World Poker Tour	Coresoft	2K Sports	2005-10-18^{NA}		Yes	Yes
World Racing	Synetic	Synetic	2003-09-19^{EU}		Yes	
World Racing 2	Evolved Games	Synetic	2005-09-29^{EU}		Yes	
World Rally Championship •WRC: World Rally Championship – Sekai Rally Senshuken^{JP}	Evolution Studios	Sony Computer Entertainment^{EU}, Spike^{JP}, BAM! Entertainment^{NA}	2001-11-30^{EU}	Yes	Yes	Yes
World Series Baseball 2K3	Blue Shift	Sega	2003-03-17^{NA}			Yes
World Series of Poker	Left Field Productions	Activision	2005-08-31^{NA}		Yes	Yes
World Series of Poker 2008: Battle for the Bracelets	Left Field Productions	Activision	2007-09-25^{NA}		Yes	Yes
World Series of Poker: Tournament of Champions	Left Field Productions	Activision	2006-09-21^{NA}		Yes	Yes
World Snooker Championship 2005	Blade Interactive	Sega	2005-04-15^{EU}		Yes	
World Snooker Championship 2007	Blade Interactive	Sega	2007-01-12^{EU}		Yes	
World Soccer Winning Eleven 2010: Aoki Samurai no Chousen (Note: update for Pro Evolution Soccer 2010.)	Konami	Konami	2010-05-20^{JP}	Yes		
World Soccer Winning Eleven 5 Final Evolution (Note: update for Pro Evolution Soccer.)	Konami	Konami	2001-12-13^{JP}	Yes		
World Soccer Winning Eleven 6 Final Evolution (Note: update for World Soccer Winning Eleven 6 International.)	Konami	Konami	2002-12-12^{JP}	Yes		
World Soccer Winning Eleven 6 International •World Soccer Winning Eleven 6^{JP} •Pro Evolution Soccer 2^{EU}	Konami	Konami	2002-04-25^{JP}	Yes	Yes	Yes
World Soccer Winning Eleven 7	Konami	Konami	2003-08-07^{JP}	Yes		
World Soccer Winning Eleven 7 International •Pro Evolution Soccer 3^{EU} (Note: update for World Soccer Winning Eleven 7.)	Konami	Konami	2003-10-17^{EU}	Yes	Yes	Yes
World Soccer Winning Eleven 8 International •World Soccer Winning Eleven 8^{JP} •Pro Evolution Soccer 4^{EU}	Konami	Konami	2004-08-05^{JP}	Yes	Yes	Yes
World Soccer Winning Eleven 8: Liveware Evolution (Note: update for World Soccer Winning Eleven 8 International.)	Konami	Konami	2005-03-24^{JP}	Yes		
World Soccer Winning Eleven 9 •Pro Evolution Soccer 5^{JP}	Konami	Konami	2005-08-04^{JP}	Yes ^{JP, KO}	Yes	Yes
World Super Police •Kousoku Kidoutai: World Super Police^{JP}	Suzak Inc.	Jaleco Entertainment, Midas Interactive Entertainment	2005-11-03^{JP}	Yes	Yes	
World Tank Museum For Game Toubu Sensen	Success	Success	2005-12-01^{JP}	Yes		
World Tour Soccer 2002 •This Is Football 2002^{EU} •This Is Soccer 2002^{AU}	London Studio	Sony Computer Entertainment	2001-09-28^{PAL}		Yes	Yes
World Tour Soccer 2003 •This Is Football 2003^{EU} •This Is Soccer 2003^{AU} •This is Football: Soccer Sekai Senki 2003^{JP}	London Studio	Sony Computer Entertainment	2002-10-04^{PAL}	Yes	Yes	Yes
World Tour Soccer 2005 •This Is Football 2004^{EU}	London Studio	Sony Computer Entertainment	2004-03-26^{EU}		Yes	Yes
World Tour Soccer 2006 •This Is Football 2005^{EU}	London Studio	Sony Computer Entertainment	2004-10-01^{NA}		Yes	Yes
World War Zero: Iron Storm	Rebellion Developments	Ubisoft	2004-08-06^{EU}		Yes	
Worms 3D	Team17	Sega^{EU}, Acclaim Entertainment^{NA}	2003-10-31^{EU}		Yes	Yes
Worms 4: Mayhem	Team17	Codemasters	2005-07-29^{EU}		Yes	
Worms Blast	Team17	Ubisoft	2002-03-28^{EU}		Yes	
Worms Forts: Under Siege	Team17	Sega	2004-11-19^{EU}		Yes	Yes
Wrath Unleashed	The Collective	LucasArts	2004-02-10^{NA}		Yes	Yes
WRC 3	Evolution Studios	Sony Computer Entertainment^{EU}, Spike^{JP}	2003-11-21^{EU}	Yes	Yes	
WRC 4: FIA World Rally Championship	Evolution Studios	Sony Computer Entertainment^{EU}, Spike^{JP}	2004-10-22^{EU}	Yes	Yes	
WRC II Extreme	Evolution Studios	Sony Computer Entertainment^{EU}, Spike^{JP}	2002-11-29^{EU}	Yes	Yes	
WRC: Rally Evolved	Evolution Studios	Sony Computer Entertainment	2005-10-28^{EU}		Yes	
Wreckless: The Yakuza Missions	Bunkasha	Activision	2002-11-13^{NA}		Yes	Yes
Wrestle Angels: Survivor	Success	Success	2006-08-24^{JP}	Yes		
Wrestle Angels: Survivor 2	Success	Tryfirst	2008-11-06^{JP}	Yes		
Wrestle Kingdom	Yuke's	Yuke's	2006-07-20^{JP}	Yes		
Wrestle Kingdom 2: Pro Wrestling Sekai Taisen	Yuke's	Yuke's	2007-05-10^{JP}	Yes		
WSC REAL 08: World Snooker Championship	Blade Interactive	Koch Media	2008-07-04^{EU}	Yes		
WTA Tour Tennis	Konami	Konami	2001-09-27^{JP}	Yes	Yes	Yes
WWC: World Wrestling Championship	Phoenix Games	Phoenix Games	2006^{EU}		Yes	
WWE All Stars	Subdued Software	THQ	2011-03-29^{NA}		Yes	Yes
WWE Crush Hour	Pacific Coast Power & Light	THQ	2003-03-17^{NA}		Yes	Yes
WWE SmackDown! Here Comes The Pain •Exciting Pro Wrestling 5^{JP}	Yuke's	THQ^{EU, NA}, Yuke's^{JP}	2003-10-27^{NA}	Yes	Yes	Yes
WWE SmackDown! Shut Your Mouth •Exciting Pro Wrestling 4^{JP}	Yuke's	THQ^{EU, NA}, Yuke's^{JP}	2002-10-31^{NA}	Yes	Yes	Yes
WWE SmackDown! vs. RAW •Exciting Pro Wrestling 6: SmackDown! vs. Raw^{JP}	Yuke's	THQ^{EU, NA}, Yuke's^{JP}	2004-11-02^{NA}	Yes	Yes	Yes
WWE SmackDown! vs. RAW 2006 •Exciting Pro Wrestling 7: SmackDown! vs. Raw 2006^{JP}	Yuke's	THQ^{EU, NA}, Yuke's^{JP}	2005-11-11^{EU}	Yes ^{JP, KO}	Yes	Yes
WWE SmackDown vs. Raw 2007	Yuke's	THQ	2006-11-10^{EU}	Yes	Yes	Yes
WWE SmackDown vs. Raw 2008	Yuke's	THQ	2007-11-09^{EU}	Yes ^{JP, KO}	Yes	Yes
WWE Smackdown vs. Raw 2009	Yuke's	THQ	2008-11-06^{AU}	Yes ^{KO}	Yes	Yes
WWE SmackDown vs. Raw 2010	Yuke's	THQ	2009-10-20^{NA}	Yes ^{KO}	Yes	Yes
WWE SmackDown vs. Raw 2011	Yuke's	THQ	2010-10-26^{NA}		Yes	Yes
WWF SmackDown! Just Bring It •Exciting Pro Wrestling 3^{JP}	Yuke's	THQ^{EU, NA}, Yuke's^{JP}	2001-11-16^{EU}	Yes	Yes	Yes
WWI: Aces of the Sky	NAPS team	Midas Interactive Entertainment	2006-09-01^{EU}		Yes	
WWII: Battle Over Europe	Midas Interactive Entertainment	Midas Interactive Entertainment	2007-10-19^{EU}		Yes	
WWII: Battle Over The Pacific	Midas Interactive Entertainment	Midas Interactive Entertainment	2006-09-29^{EU}		Yes	
WWII: Soldier	Midas Interactive Entertainment	Midas Interactive Entertainment	2005-11-11^{EU}		Yes	
WWII: Tank Battles	Midas Interactive Entertainment	Midas Interactive Entertainment	2006-04-28^{EU}		Yes	
X2: Wolverine's Revenge	GenePool Software	Activision	2003-04-14^{NA}		Yes	Yes
Xena Warrior Princess	Blast! Entertainment	Blast! Entertainment	2006-12-15^{EU}		Yes	
Xenosaga Episode I: Der Wille zur Macht •Xenosaga Episode I: Chikara e no Ishi^{JP} (different version) •Xenosaga Episode I Reloaded: Chikara e no Ishi^{JP}	Monolith Soft	Namco	2002-02-28^{JP}	Yes		Yes
Xenosaga Episode II: Jenseits von Gut und Böse	Monolith Soft	Namco	2004-06-21^{AS}	Yes ^{AS, JP}	Yes	Yes
Xenosaga Episode III: Also sprach Zarathustra •Xenosaga Episode III: Zarathustra wa Kaku Katariki^{JP}	Monolith Soft	Namco Bandai Games	2006-07-04^{AS}	Yes ^{AS, JP}		Yes
Xenosaga Freaks (Note: includes adventure and word-puzzle mini-games.)	Monolith Soft	Namco	2004-04-28^{JP}	Yes ^{AS, JP}		
The X-Factor: Sing	Lago	Black Bean Games	2005-10-21^{EU}		Yes	
The X-Files: Resist or Serve	Black Ops Entertainment	Vivendi Universal Games	2004-03-16^{NA}		Yes	Yes
XG3: Extreme G Racing	Acclaim Studios Cheltenham	Acclaim Entertainment	2001-08-21^{NA}	Yes	Yes	Yes
XGRA: Extreme-G Racing Association	Acclaim Studios Cheltenham	Acclaim Entertainment	2003-09-11^{NA}		Yes	Yes
Xiaolin Showdown	BottleRocket Entertainment	Konami	2006-11-14^{NA}		Yes	Yes
XII Stag	Dreams	Taito^{JP}, 505 Game Street^{EU}	2003-03-20^{JP}	Yes ^{JP, KO}	Yes	
XIII	Ubisoft Paris	Ubisoft^{EU, NA}, Marvelous Entertainment^{JP}	2003-11-18^{NA}	Yes	Yes	Yes
X-Men Legends	Raven Software	Activision	2004-09-21^{NA}		Yes	Yes
X-Men Legends II: Rise of Apocalypse	Raven Software	Activision	2005-09-20^{NA}		Yes	Yes
X-Men: Next Dimension	Paradox Development	Activision	2002-10-15^{NA}		Yes	Yes
X-Men Origins: Wolverine	Amaze Entertainment	Activision	2009-04-29^{AU}		Yes	Yes
X-Men: The Official Game	Z-Axis	Activision	2006-05-16^{NA}		Yes	Yes
X-Squad •X Fire^{JP}	Electronic Arts Square	Electronic Arts	2000-08-03^{JP}	Yes	Yes	Yes
X-treme Express •Tetsu 1: Densha de Battle! World Grand Prix^{JP}	Syscom	Syscom^{JP}, Midas Interactive Entertainment^{EU}	2002-02-21^{JP}	Yes	Yes	
X-treme Quads	Phoenix Games	Phoenix Games	2005-03-04^{EU}		Yes	
Xtreme Speed	Phoenix Games	Phoenix Games	2004-10-08^{EU}		Yes	
xxxHolic: Watanuki no Izayoi Souwa	Tenky	Marvelous Entertainment	2007-08-09^{JP}	Yes		
Xyanide: Resurrection •Xyanide^{JP}	Playlogic Entertainment	Playlogic Entertainment^{EU}, Ertain^{JP}	2007-07-31^{EU}	Yes	Yes	
Yakiniku Bugyou Bonfire!	Media Entertainment	Media Entertainment	2003-08-14^{JP}	Yes		
Yakuza •Ryuu ga Gotoku^{JP, KO}	Sega	Sega	2005-12-08^{JP}	Yes ^{JP, KO}	Yes	Yes
Yakuza 2 •Ryuu ga Gotoku 2^{JP, KO}	Sega	Sega	2006-12-07^{JP}	Yes ^{JP, KO}	Yes	Yes
Yakuza Fury •Simple 2000 Series Vol. 72: The Ninkyou^{JP}	Vingt-et-un Systems	D3 Publisher^{JP}, 505 Game Street^{EU}	2005-02-17^{JP}	Yes	Yes	
Yamaha Supercross	Coyote Console	DSI Games^{JP}, Zoo Digital Publishing^{EU}	2009-04-03^{EU}		Yes	
The Yamanote Sen: Train Simulator Real	Ongakukan	Sony Computer Entertainment	2001-10-04^{JP}	Yes		
Yamasa Digi World 2: LCD Edition	Yamasa	Yamasa	2002-01-24^{JP}	Yes		
Yamasa Digi World 3	Yamasa	Yamasa	2002-07-25^{JP}	Yes		
Yamasa Digi World 4	Yamasa	Yamasa	2003-02-20^{JP}	Yes		
Yamasa Digi World: Collaboration SP Pachi-Slot Ridge Racer	Bandai Namco Games	Bandai Namco Games	2008-06-05^{JP}	Yes		
Yamasa Digi World SP	Yamasa	Yamasa	2002-09-26^{JP}	Yes		
Yamasa Digi World SP: Giant Pulsar	Yamasa	Yamasa	2006-09-07^{JP}	Yes		
Yamasa Digi World SP: Moe yo! Kung Fu Lady	Yamasa	Yamasa	2006-04-27^{JP}	Yes		
Yamasa Digi World SP: Neo Magic Pulsar XX	Yamasa	Yamasa	2003-11-06^{JP}	Yes		
Yamasa Digi World SP: Umi Ichiban R	Yamasa	Yamasa	2003-05-01^{JP}	Yes		
Yamiyo ni Sasayaku: Meitantei Kyouichirou Sagara	Idea Factory	Idea Factory	2006-02-09^{JP}	Yes		
Yanya Caballista: City Skater •Yanya Caballista featuring Gawoo^{JP}	Cave	Koei	2001-07-05^{JP}	Yes		Yes
Yatohime Zankikou	NIne'sFox	NIne'sFox	2007-07-26^{JP}	Yes		
YetiSports Arctic Adventures	Pirate Games	JoWooD Productions	2005-07-22^{EU}		Yes	
Yoake Mae Yori Ruriiro na: Brighter than Dawning Blue	Aria	Aria	2006-12-07^{JP}	Yes		
Yoake no Mariko	Sony Computer Entertainment	Sony Computer Entertainment	2001-12-06^{JP}	Yes		
Yoake no Mariko 2nd Act	Sony Computer Entertainment	Sony Computer Entertainment	2002-01-24^{JP}	Yes		
Yo-Jin-Bo: Unmei no Freude	TwoFive	TwoFive	2006-10-26^{JP}	Yes		
Yomigaeri: Refrain	Tomcat System	D3 Publisher	2004-03-25^{JP}	Yes		
Yoshinoya	Success	Success	2004-05-27^{JP}	Yes		
Yoshitsune Eiyūden Shura: The Story of Hero Yoshitsune Shura	FromSoftware	FromSoftware	2005-10-27^{JP}	Yes		
Yoshitsune Eiyūden: The Story of Hero Yoshitsune	FromSoftware	FromSoftware	2005-01-13^{JP}	Yes		
Yoshitsune-ki	DreamFactory	Banpresto	2005-12-01^{JP}	Yes		
Yotsunoha: A Journey of Sincerity	Gadget Soft	Gadget Soft	2008-08-28^{JP}	Yes		
Youki Hime Den	Idea Factory	Idea Factory	2007-08-30^{JP}	Yes		
Your Memories Off: Girl's Style	5pb	5pb	2008-01-31^{JP}	Yes		
Ys I And II Eternal Story	DigiCube	Nihon Falcom	2003-08-07^{JP}	Yes		
Ys III: Wanderers from Ys	Nihon Falcom	Taito	2005-03-24^{JP}	Yes		
Ys IV: Mask of the Sun	Nihon Falcom	Taito	2005-05-26^{JP}	Yes		
Ys: The Ark of Napishtim	Nihon Falcom	Konami	2005-02-22^{NA}	Yes	Yes	Yes
Ys V: Lost Kefin, Kingdom of Sand	Nihon Falcom	Taito	2006-03-30^{JP}	Yes		
Yu Yu Hakusho: Dark Tournament	Digital Fiction	Atari	2004-09-21^{NA}		Yes	Yes
Yu Yu Hakusho Forever	Konami	Konami	2005-05-19^{JP}	Yes		
Yu-Gi-Oh! Capsule Monster Coliseum	Konami	Konami	2004-07-29^{JP}	Yes	Yes	Yes
Yu-Gi-Oh! GX: The Beginning of Destiny •Yu-Gi-Oh! GX: Tag Force Evolution^{PAL} •Yu-Gi-Oh Duel Monsters GX: Tag Force Evolution^{JP}	Konami	Konami	2007-12-06^{JP}	Yes	Yes	Yes
Yu-Gi-Oh! The Duelists of the Roses •Yu-Gi-Oh! Shin Duel Monsters II^{JP}	Konami	Konami	2001-09-06^{JP}	Yes	Yes	Yes
Yuki Gatari: Renewal Edition	Takuyo	Takuyo	2005-07-28^{JP}	Yes		
Yumemi Hakusho: Second Dream	PrincessSoft	PrincessSoft	2008-10-30^{JP}	Yes		
Yumemishi	PrincessSoft	PrincessSoft	2006-12-28^{JP}	Yes		
Yumeria	Namco	Namco	2003-04-24^{JP}	Yes		
The Yuujou Adventure: Hotaru Soul •Simple 2000 Series Vol. 38: The Yuujou Adventure: Hotaru Soul^{JP}	HuneX	D3 Publisher	2003-10-30^{JP}	Yes		
Zapper: One Wicked Cricket	Blitz Games	Infogrames	2002-11-03^{NA}		Yes	Yes
Zatch Bell! Mamodo Battles •Konjiki no Gash Bell!! Yuujou Tag Battle 2^{JP}	Eighting	Bandai	2005-03-24^{JP}	Yes		Yes
Zatch Bell! Mamodo Fury •Konjiki no Gash Bell!! Gekitou! Saikyou no Mamonotachi^{JP}	Mechanic Arms	Namco Bandai Games	2004-12-02^{JP}	Yes		Yes
Zathura	High Voltage Software	2K Games	2005-11-02^{NA}		Yes	Yes
Zero no Tsukaima: Maigo no Period to Ikusen no Symphony	Marvelous Entertainment	Marvelous Entertainment	2008-11-06^{JP}	Yes		
Zero no Tsukaima: Muma ga Tsumugu Yokaze no Nocturne	Marvelous Entertainment	Marvelous Entertainment	2007-11-29^{JP}	Yes		
Zero no Tsukaima: Shou-akuma to Harukaze no Concerto	Marvelous Entertainment	Marvelous Entertainment	2007-02-15^{JP}	Yes		
Zero Pilot: Kosora no Kiseki	Opera House	Sammy	2003-12-11^{JP}	Yes		
Zero Pilot: Zero	Opera House	Sammy	2006-07-27^{JP}	Yes		
Zero Shikikan Josentoki Ni	Marionette	Taito	2006-02-23^{JP}	Yes		
Zero4 Champ Series: Drift Champ	Hudson Soft	Hudson Soft	2002-11-21^{JP}	Yes		
Zill O'll Infinite	Koei	Koei	2005-06-23^{JP}	Yes		
Zipang	Artdink	Bandai	2005-05-26^{JP}	Yes		
Zoids Infinity Fuzors	Tomy	Tomy	2005-02-17^{JP}	Yes		
Zoids Struggle	Tomy	Tomy	2004-11-18^{JP}	Yes		
Zoids Tactics	Tomy	Tomy	2005-08-11^{JP}	Yes		
Zoku Segare Ijiri	Enix	Enix	2002-06-27^{JP}	Yes		
Zombie Attack •Simple 2000 Series Vol. 65: The Kyonshi Panic^{JP}	Tamsoft	D3 Publisher^{JP}, 505 Game Street^{EU}	2004-10-14^{JP}	Yes	Yes	
Zombie Hunters •Simple 2000 Series Vol. 80: The Oneechanpuruu^{JP} (Note: update for Zombie Zone.)	Tamsoft	D3 Publisher^{JP}, Essential Games^{EU}	2005-06-23^{JP}	Yes	Yes	
Zombie Hunters 2 •Simple 2000 Series Vol. 101: The Oneechanpon: The Oneechan 2 Special Edition^{JP} (Note: update for Simple 2000 Series Vol. 90: The OneeChanbara 2.)	Tamsoft	D3 Publisher^{JP}, Essential Games^{EU}	2006-06-29^{JP}	Yes	Yes	
Zombie Virus •Simple 2000 Series Vol. 95: The Zombie vs. Kyuukyuusha^{JP}	Vingt-et-un Systems	D3 Publisher^{JP}, Essential Games^{EU}	2006-02-09^{JP}	Yes	Yes	
Zombie Zone •Simple 2000 Series Vol. 61: The Oneechanbara^{JP}	Tamsoft	D3 Publisher^{JP}, 505 Game Street^{EU}	2004-08-26^{JP}	Yes	Yes	
Zone of the Enders •Z.O.E.: Zone of the Enders^{JP}	Konami	Konami	2001-03-01^{JP}	Yes	Yes	Yes
Zone of the Enders: The 2nd Runner •Anubis: Zone of the Enders^{JP} •Anubis: Zone of the Enders Special Edition^{JP} (different version) •Zone of the Enders: The 2nd Runner Special Edition^{EU} (different version)	Konami	Konami	2003-02-13^{JP}	Yes ^{JP, KO}	Yes	Yes
Zoo Puzzle •SuperLite 2000: Zooo^{JP}	Success	Success^{JP}, 505 Game Street^{EU}	2004-02-12^{JP}	Yes	Yes	
ZooCube	PuzzleKings	Midas Interactive Entertainment	2006-07-21^{PAL}		Yes	
Zwei: The Arges Adventure	Nihon Falcom	Taito	2004-08-26^{JP}	Yes		

== Applications ==
Title	Developer	Publisher	First released	JP	EU^{/ PAL}	NA
Linux for PlayStation 2	Sony Computer Entertainment	Sony Computer Entertainment	2002	Yes	Yes	Yes
Loop Sequencer: Music Generator	Success	Success	2005-03-31^{JP}	Yes		
Magix Music Maker	Magix	Magix	2001-12-07^{JP}		Yes	Yes
Magix Music Maker: Rockstar	Magix	Magix	2009-08-07^{EU}		Yes	
Medical and Engineering Joint Entrance Quiz	Candela Software	Sony Computer Entertainment	2009-06-03^{IN}		Yes ^{IN}	
Moderngroove: Ministry of Sound Edition	Ubisoft	Ubisoft	2001-07-13^{EU}		Yes	
Motion Gravure Series: Kitagawa Tomomi	Sony Music Entertainment	Sony Music Entertainment	2003-04-24^{JP}	Yes		
Motion Gravure Series: Megumi	Sony Music Entertainment	Sony Music Entertainment	2003-04-24^{JP}	Yes		
Motion Gravure Series: Mori Hiroko	Sony Music Entertainment	Sony Music Entertainment	2003-04-24^{JP}	Yes		
Motion Gravure Series: Nemoto Harumi	Sony Music Entertainment	Sony Music Entertainment	2003-04-24^{JP}	Yes		
MTV Music Generator 2	Jester Interactive	Codemasters	2001-05-19^{NA}		Yes	Yes
MTV Music Generator 3: This Is The Remix	Mix Max	Codemasters	2004-06-18^{EU}		Yes	Yes
Nihongo Daijiten	Kodansha	Artdink	2001-12-06^{JP}	Yes		
Planetarian: Chiisana Hoshi no Yume	Key	Prototype	2006-08-24^{JP}	Yes		
Primal Image for Printer	Atlus	Atlus	2000-12-07^{JP}	Yes		
Pro Atlas for TV: Kinki	Artdink	Artdink	2001-12-27^{JP}	Yes		
Pro Atlas for TV: Shutoken	Artdink	Artdink	2001-12-27^{JP}	Yes		
Pro Atlas for TV: Toukai	Artdink	Artdink	2001-12-27^{JP}	Yes		
Pro Atlas for TV: Zengokuban	Artdink	Artdink	2001-12-27^{JP}	Yes		
Shinkyoku Sōkai Polyphonica	Ocelot	Prototype	2007-04-26^{JP}	Yes		
Shinkyoku Sōkai Polyphonica: 3&4 Hanashi Kanketsuhen	Ocelot	Prototype	2007-12-27^{JP}	Yes		
Shinkyoku Sōkai Polyphonica: After School	Prototype	Prototype	2010-11-11^{JP}	Yes		
Shinkyoku Sōkai Polyphonica: The Black ~Episode 1&2 CS Edition~	Ocelot	Prototype	2009-01-15^{JP}	Yes		
The Touyou Sandai Uranjustsu •Simple 2000 Series Vol. 40: The Touyou Sandai Uranjustsu^{JP}	Game Stage	D3 Publisher	2003-11-06^{JP}	Yes		
Virtual View: Megumi Eyes Play	Pony Canyon	Pony Canyon	2003-07-17^{JP}	Yes		
Virtual View: Nemoto Harumi Eizou Play	Pony Canyon	Pony Canyon	2003-07-17^{JP}	Yes		
Virtual View: R.C.T. Eyes Play	Pony Canyon	Pony Canyon	2003-07-17^{JP}	Yes		
Visual Mix Ayumi Hamasaki Dome Tour 2001	Avex	Avex	2001-12-13^{JP}	Yes		
World Quiz 2009	Milestone Interactive	Sony Computer Entertainment	2009-08-03^{IN}		Yes ^{IN}	
Yourself!Fitness	Respondesign	Respondesign	2005-04-11^{NA}			Yes

== Bundles ==
Title	Developer	Publisher	First released	JP	EU^{/ PAL}	NA
The Lord of the Rings Collectie •Compilation of The Lord of the Rings The Two Towers, The Return of the King and The Third Age	EA Redwood Shores	Electronic Arts	2006-05-15^{PAL}		Yes	
Medal of Honor Collection •Compilation of Medal of Honor: European Assault, Medal of Honor: Frontline and Medal of Honor: Rising Sun	Electronic Arts	Electronic Arts	2007-03-06^{NA}			Yes
Metal Gear 20th Anniversary: Metal Gear Solid Collection •Compilation of Metal Gear Solid, Metal Gear Solid 2: Substance, Metal Gear Solid 3: Subsistence, Metal Gear Solid: Portable Ops and The Document of Metal Gear Solid 2	Konami	Konami	2007-07-26^{JP}	Yes		
Metal Gear Solid: The Essential Collection •Compilation of Metal Gear Solid, Metal Gear Solid 2: Substance and Metal Gear Solid 3: Subsistence	Konami	Konami	2008-03-18^{NA}			Yes
Metal Slug 4 And 5	BrezzaSoft	SNK Playmore	2005-05-25^{NA}	Yes ^{KO}		Yes
Mortal Kombat: Kollection •Compilation of Mortal Kombat: Armageddon, Mortal Kombat: Deception and Mortal Kombat: Shaolin Monks	Midway Games	Midway Games	2008-09-29^{NA}			Yes
Moujūtsukai to Oujisama Twin Pack •Compilation of Moujūtsukai to Oujisama and Moujūtsukai to Oujisama: Snow Bride	Design Factory	Idea Factory	2011-02-24^{JP}	Yes		
My Merry May With Be •Compilation of My Merry May and My Merry Maybe	KID	KID	2005-06-30^{JP}	Yes		
Namco Classic Fighter Collection •Compilation of SoulCalibur II, Tekken 4 and Tekken Tag Tournament	Namco Bandai Games	Namco Bandai Games	2008-09-19^{NA}			Yes
Naruto Ultimate Collection •Compilation of Naruto: Ultimate Ninja, Naruto: Ultimate Ninja 2 and Naruto: Uzumaki Chronicles	Namco Bandai Games	Namco Bandai Games	2008-09-17^{NA}			Yes
Need for Speed: Collector's Series •Compilation of Need for Speed Underground, Need for Speed Underground 2 and Need for Speed: Most Wanted	EA Canada	Electronic Arts	2006-11-14^{NA}			Yes
NeoGeo Online Collection Complete Box Gekkan •Compilation of Bakumatsu Rouman: Gekka no Kenshi 1-2, Fu'un Super Combo, The King of Fighters '98 Ultimate Match, The King of Fighters Collection: The Orochi Saga, The King of Fighters NESTS Collection and World Heroes Anthology	SNK Playmore	SNK Playmore	2009-12-23^{JP}	Yes		
NeoGeo Online Collection Complete Box Joukan •Compilation of Art of Fighting Anthology, Fatal Fury: Battle Archives Volume 1, Fatal Fury: Battle Archives Volume 2, Garou: Mark of the Wolves, Samurai Shodown Anthology and Sunsoft Collection	SNK Playmore	SNK Playmore	2009-12-23^{JP}	Yes		
Neoromance Box: Angelique Selection •Compilation of Angelique Etoile and Neo Angelique	Koei	Koei	2006-08-10^{JP}	Yes		
Neoromance Box: Triple Selection •Compilation of Angelique Trois: Aizouhen, Harukanaru Toki no Naka de 2 and La Corda d'Oro	Koei	Koei	2006-08-10^{JP}	Yes		
Onimusha: Essentials •Compilation of Onimusha 2: Samurai's Destiny, Onimusha 3: Demon Siege and Onimusha: Warlords	Capcom	Capcom	2008-11-13^{NA}			Yes
Pac-Man Power Pack •Compilation of Pac-Man World 2, Pac-Man World 3 and Pac-Man World Rally	Namco Bandai Games	Namco Bandai Games	2008-09-17^{NA}			Yes
Prince of Persia Trilogy •Compilation of Prince of Persia: The Sands of Time, Prince of Persia: The Two Thrones and Prince of Persia: Warrior Within	Ubisoft	Ubisoft	2006-10-27^{EU}		Yes	
Psikyo Shooting Collection Vol. 3: Sol Divide & Dragon Blaze	Psikyo	Taito	2005-03-31^{JP}	Yes		
Psyvariar: Complete Edition •Compilation of Psyvariar Revision and Psyvariar: Medium Unit	Skonec	Success^{JP, KO}, Empire Interactive^{EU}	2002-03-28^{JP}	Yes ^{JP, KO}	Yes	
The Puzzle Collection 2000 •Simple 2000 2-in-1 Series Vol. 3: The Puzzle Collection 2,000-Mon & The Touyou Sandai Uranjustsu^{JP}	HuneX, Game Stage	D3 Publisher	2005-06-02^{JP}	Yes		
Ratchet & Clank Triple Pack •Compilation of Racthet and Clank, Ratchet & Clank: Going Commando and Ratchet & Clank: Up Your Arsenal	Insomniac Games	Sony Computer Entertainment	2009-03-20^{EU}		Yes	
Rayman: 10th Anniversary •Compilation of Rayman 2: Revolution, Rayman 3: Hoodlum Havoc and Rayman Arena	Ubisoft	Ubisoft	2005-09-05^{EU}		Yes	
Resident Evil: The Essentials •Compilation of Resident Evil 4, Resident Evil Code: Veronica X and Resident Evil Outbreak	Capcom	Capcom	2007-09-11^{NA}			Yes
Sega Classics Collection	Sega	Sega	2005-03-22^{NA}		Yes	Yes
Sega Rally 2006 & Sega Rally Championship 1995	Sega	Sega	2006-01-09^{JP}	Yes		
Sengoku Musou Kouryaku Box •Compilation of Samurai Warriors and Taikou Risshiden IV	Koei	Koei	2004-06-24^{JP}	Yes		
Shin Megami Tensei: Devil Summoner 2 Raidou Kuzunoha vs. King Abaddon Plus •Compilation of Shin Megami Tensei: Devil Summoner 2 & Nocturne Maniax Edition	Atlus	Atlus	2008-10-23^{JP}	Yes		
Shin Sangoku Musou 2 Mushouden + Shin Sangoku Musou 2 •Compilation of Dynasty Warriors 3 and Dynasty Warriors 3: Xtreme Legends	Omega Force	Koei	2003-02-06^{JP}	Yes		
Shin Sangoku Musou Kouryaku Box •Compilation of Dynasty Warriors 3 and Dynasty Warriors 3: Xtreme Legends	Omega Force	Koei	2004-06-24^{JP}	Yes		
Shinkyoku Sōkai Polyphonica: 0-4 Wa Full Pack	Ocelot	Prototype	2008-04-10^{JP}	Yes		
The Shooting & The Helicopter •Simple 2000 Series 2-in-1 Vol. 5: The Shooting Double Shienryu & The Helicopter^{JP}	Tomcat System, Warashi	D3 Publisher	2005-08-04^{JP}	Yes		
The Silent Hill Collection •Compilation of Silent Hill 2, Silent Hill 3 and Silent Hill 4: The Room	Konami	Konami	2006-04-21^{EU}		Yes	
Silent Hill Complete Set •Compilation of Silent Hill, Silent Hill 2: Director's Cut, Silent Hill 3 and Silent Hill 4: The Room	Konami	Konami	2006-07-07^{JP}	Yes		
Space Channel 5: Special Edition •Compilation of Space Channel 5 and Space Channel 5: Part 2	UGA	Agetec	2003-11-18^{NA}			Yes
SpongeBob: Happy Squared Pack •Compilation of SpongeBob SquarePants: Battle for Bikini Bottom and The SpongeBob SquarePants Movie	Heavy Iron Studios	THQ	2009-03-03^{NA}			Yes
Street Fighter Anniversary Collection	Capcom	Capcom	2004-07-22^{KO}	Yes ^{KO}		Yes
Super Puzzle Bobble DX •Simple 2000 Series Vol. 62: The Super Puzzle Bobble DX^{JP} •Compilation of Super Bust-A-Move and Super Bust-A-Move 2	Taito	D3 Publisher	2004-09-22^{JP}	Yes		
S.Y.K Twin Pack •Compilation of S.Y.K Renshouden and S.Y.K Shinsetsu Saiyūki	Idea Factory	Idea Factory	2010-03-11^{JP}	Yes		
Taito Legends Gold Edition •Compilation of Taito Legends 1 and 2	Empire Interactive	Empire Interactive	2006^{PAL}		Yes	
The Tennis & The Snowboard •Simple 2000 Series 2-in-1 Vol. 1: The Tennis & The Snowboard^{JP}	Atelier Double, HuneX	D3 Publisher	2005-06-02^{JP}	Yes		
Tom Clancy's Splinter Cell Trilogy •Compilation of Tom Clancy's Splinter Cell, Tom Clancy's Splinter Cell Pandora Tomorrow and Tom Clancy's Splinter Cell: Chaos Theory	Ubisoft	Ubisoft	2009-03-30^{EU}		Yes	
Wand of Fortune Twin Pack •Compilation of Wand of Fortune and Wand of Fortune: Mirai e no Prologue	Idea Factory	Idea Factory	2010-02-25^{JP}	Yes		
Will O' Wisp: Twin Pack •Compilation of Will O' Wisp and Will O' Wisp: Easter no Kiseki	Idea Factory	Idea Factory	2008-10-09^{JP}	Yes		
WWE SmackDown vs. Raw: Superstar Series •Compilation of WWE SmackDown! vs. Raw, WWE SmackDown! vs. Raw 2006 and WWE SmackDown vs. Raw 2007	Yuke's	THQ	2008-03-04^{NA}			Yes

== See also ==
- List of PlayStation 2 games (A–K)
- List of PlayStation games (A–L)
- List of PlayStation games (M–Z)
- List of PlayStation 2 online games
- List of best-selling PlayStation 2 video games
- List of PlayStation 2 Classics for PlayStation 3
- List of PlayStation 2 games for PlayStation 4
