= Shadow of the Beast =

Shadow of the Beast may refer to:

- Shadow of the Beast (1989 video game), developed by Reflections Interactive
  - Shadow of the Beast II, released in 1990
  - Shadow of the Beast III, released in 1992
- Shadow of the Beast (2016 video game), developed by Heavy Spectrum Entertainment Labs
