= Tim Wright (Welsh musician) =

Welsh video game music composer

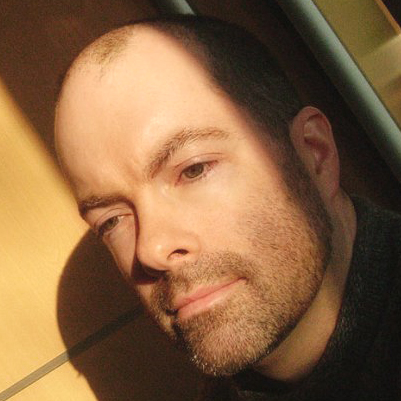
- Wright, 2008

Background information
- Also known as: CoLD SToRAGE
- Genres: Electronica; big beat; contemporary classical music; ambient music; video game music
- Occupations: Composer; programmer; creative director; managing director
- Years active: 1989–present
- Website: coldstorage.org.uk

Tim Wright, known professionally as CoLD SToRAGE (stylised as CoLD SToRAGE), is a Welsh video game music composer best known for his work on Wipeout 2097. His compositions for the game drew on 1990s UK big beat and electronic music trends, influenced by artists such as The Chemical Brothers. This style helped define Wipeout 2097's futuristic racing soundtrack and contributed to the popularisation of electronic music in video games. Wright has also contributed to the soundtracks of Shadow of the Beast II, Agony, Lemmings, and Colony Wars.

Wright’s career began in the early 1990s, with his first commercial works created using the Amiga computer and featured in computer games published by Psygnosis. He left Sony in 1997 to form Jester Interactive, developing music creation software for home consoles, such as Music and Music 2000 for the PlayStation and MTV, and Music Generator and Music 3000 for the PlayStation 2, before leaving with his brothers to form Checkmate Solutions Limited.

At Checkmate, Wright developed several musical sequencing products for Empire Interactive plc. under the eJay brand. He subsequently left to form his own company, Tantrumedia Limited, where he composes music, designs music sequencing software and oversees the production of websites and other multimedia projects.

== Career ==
Wright worked as a computer programmer for Littlewoods/Index the Catalogue Shop in the late 1980s, writing compositions for computer-based demos. His composition "Puggs in Space" brought him to the attention of Ian Hetherington, managing director of Psygnosis, who hired him to create music for a number of Psygnosis's Amiga and Atari ST games, some of which won awards. He eventually left Littlewoods to work full-time at Psygnosis, as senior sound artist on projects such as Lemmings, Wipeout, Wipeout 2097 and Colony Wars.

Leaving Psygnosis in 1997, Wright was involved in the formation of Jester Interactive, with the intention of bringing music creation and mixing to Sony's original PlayStation console. The resulting MUSICtm and MTV Music Generator series received industry awards, and several editions of the MUSICtm Software were released.

Eventually Wright left with his brother Lee to form Checkmate Solutions, in order to design a new range of eJay music sequencing software.

In 2003, Wright formed his own multimedia company, Tantrumedia Ltd., involved in web space provision, website creation, software production, design, and music released under the named CoLD SToRAGE; the name "Cold Storage" came from his office studio in Wavertree Technology Park during his time at Psygnosis, which was a poorly insulated small room with tin sheets.

In 2005, he released the CoLD_SToRAGE double album Melt, and also designed a new version of the dance/hip hop eJay music software for Empire Interactive, and made a return to Wipeout, this time for the Sony PSP with Wipeout Pure.

In 2006, Wright created music for games on the Nintendo DS, PSP and PC.

In 2008, Wright released his Android Child and Cold Storage HD albums.

In 2009, Wright wrote music for more games on the DS, Wii and PlayStation 3, including Gravity Crash. He also released his fourth studio album, Project Moonbounce 2009, which features sounds created by bouncing radio signals off the moon, to mark World Moonbounce or Earth Moon Earth (EME) day.

The soundtrack album to Gravity Crash was released in 2010 as Gravity Crash Anthems, Wright's fifth studio album. This was followed soon after by his sixth studio album, Tik Tak.

Wright's track "Tangerine" was given away as a free limited edition download as part of the 2010 Cold Storage Easter Promotion. It was unavailable to the public until it was released on Bandcamp in spring 2015.

Early in his career, Wright was the victim of plagiarism. Keyboardist Stian Aarstad copied the title track of the Amiga game "Agony" when he was recording an album with Norwegian band Dimmu Borgir; Aarstad also stole from other artists for this album. Wright was not compensated for this plagiarism.

== Awards and accolades ==
- Golden Joystick Awards 1995 : "Best Game Music - WipEout on Sony PlayStation"
- Golden Joystick Awards 1997 : "Best Sounding Game - WipEout 2097 on Sony PlayStation"
- Official PlayStation Magazine Awards 1999 : "MUSICtm - Most Innovative Game"
- Sony Computer Entertainment America Awards 2000 : "MTV Music Generator - Most Innovative Game"
- BAFTA Nomination 2000: "Interface Design : MUSIC 2000 by Jester Interactive"
- Remix64 ROTY Awards 2015: "Best Newcomer (C64 or AMIGA) CoLD SToRAGE"
- Gained BAFTA Membership in June 2023

== Video games ==
- Awesome (Amiga, 1990)
- Carthage (Amiga, 1990)
- Tentacle (Eldritch the Cat, Amiga, 1990)
- The Killing Game Show / Fatal Rewind [FMV Intro] (Amiga, 1990)
- Lemmings (Amiga, 1990)
- Shadow of the Beast 2 (Amiga, 1990)
- Armour-Geddon (Amiga, 1990)
- Powermonger (Amiga, 1990)
- Leander / Galahad (Amiga, 1991)
- Amnios (Amiga, 1991)
- Lost Soul (Atari ST, 1991)
- Agony (Amiga, 1992)
- Aquaventura (Amiga, 1992)
- Shadow of the Beast 3 (Amiga, 1992)
- Lemmings & Oh No! More Lemmings (Amiga, PC, Macintosh, PlayStation, 1992)
- Holiday Lemmings (Amiga, DOS, Macintosh, 1992)
- Puggsy (Amiga, 1993)
- Last Action Hero (Mega-CD, 1993)
- Combat Air Patrol (PC, 1993)
- Phoenix Rising (Mega-CD, 1993)
- Sensible Soccer (Mega-CD, 1993)
- Mary Shelley's Frankenstein (Mega-CD, 1994)
- Bram Stoker's Dracula (Mega-CD, 1994)
- Microcosm (Amiga CD32, 1994)
- No Escape (Mega-CD, 1994)
- Mickey Mania (Mega-CD, 1994)
- Magician's Castle (Amiga, 1994 - Unreleased)
- Championship Soccer 94 (MegaCD, 1994)
- Wipeout (PlayStation, Sega Saturn, PC, 1995)
- Flink (Amiga CD32, Sega Mega Drive, Sega Mega-CD, 1995)
- Wipeout 2097 (Amiga, PlayStation, Sega Saturn, PC, 1996)
- Krazy Ivan (PlayStation, Sega Saturn, PC, 1996)
- Formula One (PlayStation, PC, 1996)
- Adidas PowerSport Soccer (PlayStation, 1996)
- Lemmings for Windows 95 & Lemmings Paintball (PC, 1996)
- Necromantics (formerly Magician's Castle on AMIGA) (PC, 1996)
- Adidas PowerSport Soccer International 97 (PlayStation, 1997)
- Chomper (Psion 3, Psion 5, Psion Revo, 1997)
- Thunder Truck Rally (PlayStation, PC, 1997)
- Codename: Tenka (PlayStation, 1997)
- Colony Wars (PlayStation, 1997)
- Brainless (PlayStation, 1998)
- WipEout64 (N64, 1998)
- Music (PlayStation, 1998)
- Tellurian Defence (PC, 1999)
- Music 2000 / MTV Music Generator (PlayStation, PC, 1999)
- MTV Music Generator 2 (PS2, 2001)
- Supertruck Racing (PS2, 2002)
- Pocket Music (Game Boy Color, Game Boy Advance, 2002)
- Music 2002 Slinky Club Edition (PC, 2002)
- Music 3000 / Funkmaster Flex's Digital Hitz Factory (PS2, 2003)
- Jet Set Willy (J2ME, 2004)
- Wipeout Pure (PlayStation Portable, 2005)
- Ring Factory (PC, 2005)
- Dance eJay 7 (PC, 2005)
- HipHop eJay 6 (PC, 2005)
- Techno eJay 5 (PC, 2006)
- R&B eJay 1 (PC, 2007)
- eJay Virtual Music Studio (PC, 2007)
- Sudoku (NDS, 2007)
- TT Superbike Legends (PS2, 2008)
- eJay eQuality (PC, 2008)
- Spellbound Party (Wii, 2009)
- Spellbound (NDS, 2009)
- Gravity Crash (PS3/PSP, 2009)
- Sonic & Sega All-Stars Racing (Xbox 360/PS3/Wii/DS/PC/Mobile, 2010)
- Skillz (Xbox/PC, 2010)
- Sodium 2 (PS3, 2011)
- Psychroma (iOS, 2011)
- Extreme Bingo (Facebook, 2012)
- Adventure Dungeon (iOS, 2012)
- Travel Bug (PS Vita, 2012)
- Boxbeats (PS3, 2012)
- Table Top Racing (iOS, 2013)
- PlayStation 4 System Music (PS4, 2013)
- Write Your Own Music (Xbox 360, 2013)
- Slipstream GX (PC, 2013)
- Table Top Racing (Android/PSVita, 2014)
- Gravity Crash (PS Vita, 2014)
- Dynablaster Revenge (PC, 2014)
- Gravity Crash Ultra (PS4/PS Vita, 2014)
- Formula Fusion / Pacer (PC/PS4/Xbox One, 2017)

== Film scores and soundtracks ==
- Traveller: RED (Merkelbach Films, 2006)
