= PDC World Darts Championship =

Annual darts tournament

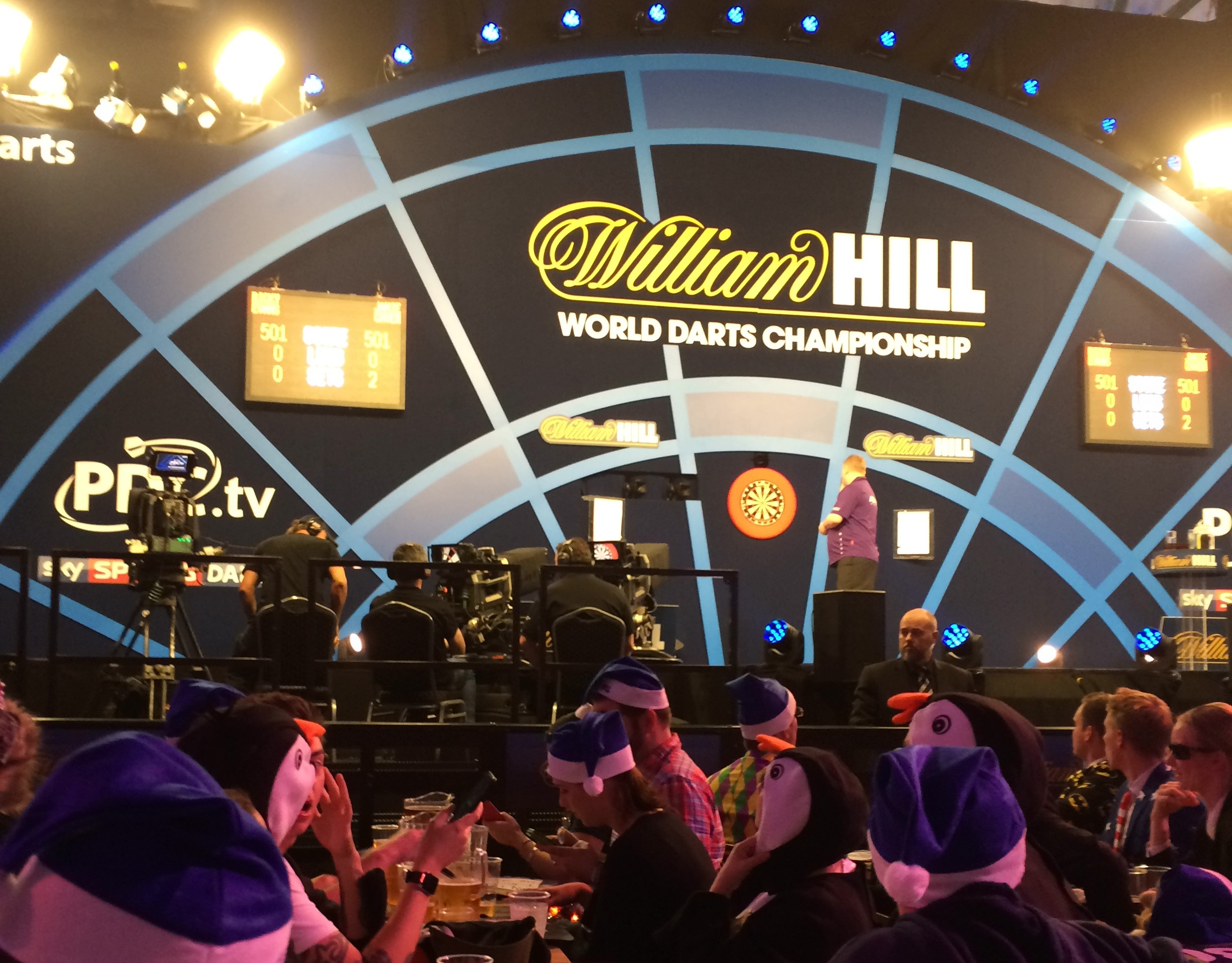
- The stage at the 2016 edition
- Founded: 1994
- First season: 1994
- Organizing body: Professional Darts Corporation
- Country: England
- Venues: Circus Tavern (1994–2007); Alexandra Palace (since 2008)
- Most recent champion: Luke Littler (2026)
- Broadcaster: Sky Sports (1993–)
- Tournament format: Sets
- 2026 PDC World Darts Championship

The PDC World Darts Championship, officially known as the Paddy Power World Darts Championship for sponsorship reasons, is a world championship competition held annually in the sport of darts. The championship begins in December and ends in January and has been held at Alexandra Palace in London since 2008. Organised by the Professional Darts Corporation (PDC), it is the most prestigious of their tournaments, with the winner receiving the Sid Waddell Trophy, named in honour of the darts commentator Sid Waddell. Along with the Premier League Darts and World Matchplay, it is part of the Triple Crown.

The PDC championship began in 1994 as the WDC World Darts Championship as one of the consequences of the split in darts, which saw the World Darts Council break away from the BDO. As a result of the settlement between the BDO and the WDC in 1997, the WDC became the PDC, and players were then free to choose which world championship to enter (but not both in the same year), as long as they met certain eligibility criteria. Both organisations continued to organize their own world championship until the 2020 editions, after which the BDO folded.

There have been thirteen different winners since the tournament's inception. With 14 wins from 25 appearances, Phil Taylor dominated the competition until last winning it in 2013. Other players to win more than once are John Part (2003 & 2008), Adrian Lewis (2011 & 2012), Gary Anderson (2015 & 2016), Michael van Gerwen (2014, 2017 & 2019), Peter Wright (2020 & 2022) and Luke Littler (2025 & 2026). The one-time winners are the inaugural champion Dennis Priestley (1994), Raymond van Barneveld (2007), Rob Cross (2018), Gerwyn Price (2021), Michael Smith (2023) and Luke Humphries (2024).

== History ==
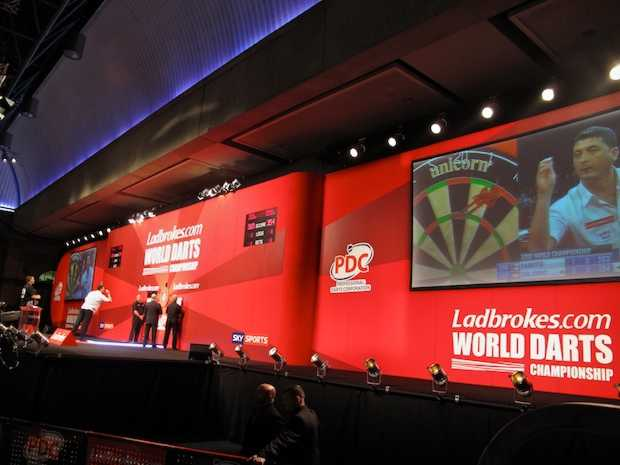
A match between Mensur Suljović and Kevin Painter at the 2010 championship

In 1992, some high-profile players, including all previous winners of the BDO World Darts Championship still active in the game, formed the WDC, and in 1994, held their first World Championship. Dennis Priestley won the inaugural competition.

The players who broke away were taking a significant gamble – the tournament was broadcast on satellite television rather than terrestrial, and from 1994 to 2001, the prize fund for the players in the WDC/PDC World Championship was lower than the prize fund in the BDO version, although the 1997 PDC World Champion received £45,000 compared to that year's BDO World Champion receiving £38,000. In 2002, the PDC prize fund overtook that of the BDO for the first time, and the PDC event now boasts the largest prize fund of any darts competition. In 2010, the prize fund reached £1 million for the first time, with the champion collecting £200,000.

The 2014 and 2015 PDC world champions collected £250,000 for their wins. For the next three years, the winner's share increased by £50,000 each year culminating in a 2018 prize fund of £1.8 million. The prize fund for the tournament was £2.5 million with £500,000 to the winner from 2019. The 2025/26 World Championship will see the field expand to 128 players with the prize fund increasing to £5 million with a record £1 million to the champion.

In the 2001 PDC World Darts Championship Gayl King became the first woman to play in the PDC World Darts Championship. Since then Anastasia Dobromyslova, Deta Hedman, Lisa Ashton, Fallon Sherrock, Mikuru Suzuki, Beau Greaves and Noa-Lynn van Leuven have all played in the PDC World Darts Championship. In the 2020 PDC World Darts Championship Sherrock became the first woman to defeat a man in the PDC World Darts Championship, when she defeated Ted Evetts. In the next round she also defeated Mensur Suljovic before losing to Chris Dobey. Sherrock remains the only woman to defeat a man in the PDC World Darts Championship.

== Venue ==
The tournament has been held at Alexandra Palace in London since 2008, having previously been held at the Circus Tavern in Purfleet, Essex, from 1994 to 2007. Currently, the play takes place inside the venue's West Hall, which has a capacity of 3,200. From the edition of 2027, the play will take place at the Great Hall, which expands the capacity to 5,000.

== List of finals ==
Year	Champion (average in final)	Score	Runner-up (average in final)	Prize money		
Year	Champion (average in final)	Score	Runner-up (average in final)	Total	Champion	Runner-up
1994	Dennis Priestley (94.38)	6–1	Phil Taylor (85.62)	£64,000	£16,000	£8,000
1995	Phil Taylor (94.11)	6–2	Rod Harrington (87.15)	£55,000	£12,000	£6,000
1996	Phil Taylor (98.52)	6–4	Dennis Priestley (101.48)	£62,500	£14,000	£7,000
1997	Phil Taylor (100.92)	6–3	Dennis Priestley (96.78)	£99,500	£45,000	£10,000
1998	Phil Taylor (103.98)	6–0	Dennis Priestley (90.75)	£72,500	£20,000	£10,000
1999	Phil Taylor (97.11)	6–2	Peter Manley (93.63)	£104,000	£30,000	£16,000
2000	Phil Taylor (94.42)	7–3	Dennis Priestley (91.80)	£111,000	£31,000	£16,400
2001	Phil Taylor (107.46)	7–0	John Part (92.58)	£125,000	£33,000	£18,000
2002	Phil Taylor (98.47)	7–0	Peter Manley (91.35)	£205,000	£50,000	£25,000
2003	John Part (96.87)	7–6	Phil Taylor (99.98)	£237,000	£50,000	£25,000
2004	Phil Taylor (96.03)	7–6	Kevin Painter (90.48)	£257,000	£50,000	£25,000
2005	Phil Taylor (96.14)	7–4	Mark Dudbridge (90.66)	£300,000	£60,000	£30,000
2006	Phil Taylor (106.74)	7–0	Peter Manley (91.72)	£500,000	£100,000	£50,000
2007	Raymond van Barneveld (100.93)	7–6	Phil Taylor (100.86)	£500,000	£100,000	£50,000
2008	John Part (92.86)	7–2	Kirk Shepherd (85.10)	£589,000	£100,000	£50,000
2009	Phil Taylor (110.94)	7–1	Raymond van Barneveld (101.18)	£724,000	£125,000	£60,000
2010	Phil Taylor (104.38)	7–3	Simon Whitlock (100.51)	£1,000,000	£200,000	£100,000
2011	Adrian Lewis (99.40)	7–5	Gary Anderson (99.41)	£1,000,000	£200,000	£100,000
2012	Adrian Lewis (93.06)	7–3	Andy Hamilton (90.83)	£1,000,000	£200,000	£100,000
2013	Phil Taylor (103.04)	7–4	Michael van Gerwen (100.66)	£1,000,000	£200,000	£100,000
2014	Michael van Gerwen (100.10)	7–4	Peter Wright (95.71)	£1,050,000	£250,000	£100,000
2015	Gary Anderson (97.68)	7–6	Phil Taylor (100.69)	£1,250,000	£250,000	£120,000
2016	Gary Anderson (99.26)	7–5	Adrian Lewis (100.23)	£1,500,000	£300,000	£150,000
2017	Michael van Gerwen (108.06)	7–3	Gary Anderson (104.93)	£1,650,000	£350,000	£160,000
2018	Rob Cross (107.67)	7–2	Phil Taylor (102.26)	£1,800,000	£400,000	£170,000
2019	Michael van Gerwen (102.21)	7–3	Michael Smith (95.29)	£2,500,000	£500,000	£200,000
2020	Peter Wright (102.79)	7–3	Michael van Gerwen (102.88)	£2,500,000	£500,000	£200,000
2021	Gerwyn Price (100.08)	7–3	Gary Anderson (94.25)	£2,500,000	£500,000	£200,000
2022	Peter Wright (98.34)	7–5	Michael Smith (99.22)	£2,500,000	£500,000	£200,000
2023	Michael Smith (100.71)	7–4	Michael van Gerwen (99.58)	£2,500,000	£500,000	£200,000
2024	Luke Humphries (103.67)	7–4	Luke Littler (101.13)	£2,500,000	£500,000	£200,000
2025	Luke Littler (102.73)	7–3	Michael van Gerwen (100.69)	£2,500,000	£500,000	£200,000
2026	Luke Littler (106.02)	7–1	Gian van Veen (99.94)	£5,000,000	£1,000,000	£400,000

== Records and statistics ==
As of 3 January 2026.

=== Total finalist appearances ===
Rank	Player	Winner	Runner-up	Finals	Apps
1	Phil Taylor	14	5	19	25
2	**Michael van Gerwen**	3	4	7	18
3	**Gary Anderson**	2	3	5	16
4	John Part	2	1	3	18
4	Adrian Lewis	2	1	3	18
4	**Peter Wright**	2	1	3	16
4	**Luke Littler**	2	1	3	3
8	Dennis Priestley	1	4	5	19
9	**Michael Smith**	1	2	3	14
10	**Raymond van Barneveld**	1	1	2	18
11	**Luke Humphries**	1	0	1	8
11	**Rob Cross**	1	0	1	8
11	**Gerwyn Price**	1	0	1	11
14	Peter Manley	0	3	3	13
15	Rod Harrington	0	1	1	10
15	Kevin Painter	0	1	1	17
15	Mark Dudbridge	0	1	1	10
15	Kirk Shepherd	0	1	1	4
15	**Simon Whitlock**	0	1	1	15
15	Andy Hamilton	0	1	1	13
15	**Gian van Veen**	0	1	1	3

- Active players are shown in **bold**
- Only players who reached the final are included
- In the event of identical records, players are sorted by date first achieved

=== Champions by country ===
Country	Players	Total	First title	Last title
England	7	22	1994	2026
Netherlands	2	4	2007	2019
Scotland	2	4	2015	2022
Canada	1	2	2003	2008
Wales	1	1	2021	2021

=== Nine-dart finishes ===
Sixteen nine-dart finishes have been thrown at the World Championship. The first one was in 2009.
Two have been made in world finals: firstly by Adrian Lewis in 2011 and then Michael Smith in 2023.

Number	Player	Year (+ Round)	Method	Opponent	Result
1.	Raymond van Barneveld	2009, Quarter-Final	3 x T20; 3 x T20; T20, T19, D12	Jelle Klaasen	Won
2.	Raymond van Barneveld	2010, 2nd Round	3 x T20; 3 x T20; T20, T19, D12	Brendan Dolan	Won
3.	Adrian Lewis	2011, Final	3 x T20; 3 x T20; T20, T19, D12	Gary Anderson	Won
4.	Dean Winstanley	2013, 2nd Round	3 x T20; 3 x T20; T20, T19, D12	Vincent van der Voort	Lost
5.	Michael van Gerwen	2013, Semi-Final	3 x T20; 2 x T20, T19; 2 x T20, D12	James Wade	Won
6.	Terry Jenkins	2014, 1st Round	3 x T20; 3 x T20; T20, T19, D12	Per Laursen	Lost
7.	Kyle Anderson	2014, 1st Round	3 x T20; 3 x T20; T20, T19, D12	Ian White	Lost
8.	Adrian Lewis	2015, 3rd Round	3 x T20; 3 x T20; T20, T19, D12	Raymond van Barneveld	Lost
9.	Gary Anderson	2016, Semi-Final	3 x T20; 3 x T20; T20, T19, D12	Jelle Klaasen	Won
10.	James Wade	2021, 3rd Round	3 x T20; 3 x T20; T20, T19, D12	Stephen Bunting	Lost
11.	William Borland	2022, 1st Round	3 x T20; 2 x T20, T19; 2 x T20, D12	Bradley Brooks	Won
12.	Darius Labanauskas	2022, 1st Round	T20, 2 x T19; 3 x T20; T20, T17, D18	Mike De Decker	Lost
13.	Gerwyn Price	2022, Quarter-Final	3 x T20; 3 x T20; T19, T20, D12	Michael Smith	Lost
14.	Michael Smith	2023, Final	3 x T20; 3 x T20; T20, T19, D12	Michael van Gerwen	Won
15.	Christian Kist	2025, 1st Round	3 x T20; 3 x T20; T20, T19, D12	Madars Razma	Lost
16.	Damon Heta	2025, 3rd Round	3 x T20; 3 x T20; T20, T19, D12	Luke Woodhouse	Lost

=== Averages ===
Since the breakaway of the PDC players, there has been much debate about the relative merits of the players within each organisation. The debate often focuses on the three-dart averages of players in matches.

In 2010 Phil Taylor became the first player to average over 100 in all six rounds of the tournament. He repeated this feat (though lost the final) in 2015 and Michael van Gerwen achieved it in 2017 and 2019.

Ten highest PDC World Championship one-match averages
Average	Player	Year (+Round)	Opponent	Result
114.05	Michael van Gerwen	2017, Semi-Final	Raymond van Barneveld	6–2
111.21	Phil Taylor	2002, 2nd Round	Shayne Burgess	6–1
110.94	Phil Taylor	2009, Final	Raymond van Barneveld	7–1
109.34	Raymond van Barneveld	2017, Semi-Final	Michael van Gerwen	2–6
109.23	Michael van Gerwen	2016, 2nd Round	Darren Webster	4–0
109.00	Phil Taylor	2007, 2nd Round	Mick McGowan	4–1
108.98	Michael van Gerwen	2021, 2nd Round	Ryan Murray	3–1
108.80	Phil Taylor	2009, Quarter-Final	Co Stompé	5–0
108.74	Luke Humphries	2024, Semi-Final	Scott Williams	6–0
108.65	Michael van Gerwen	2018, 2nd Round	James Wilson	4–0

Five highest losing averages
Average	Player	Year (+Round)	Opponent	Result
109.34	Raymond van Barneveld	2017, Semi-Final	Michael van Gerwen	2–6
106.09	Jeffrey de Zwaan	2019, 2nd Round	Rob Cross	1–3
106.07	Cristo Reyes	2017, 2nd Round	Michael van Gerwen	2–4
105.78	Michael van Gerwen	2016, 3rd Round	Raymond van Barneveld	3–4
104.93	Gary Anderson	2017, Final	Michael van Gerwen	3–7

Players with 5 or more 100+ match average (updated 3 January 2026)
Player	Total	Highest Av.	Year (+Round)
Phil Taylor	56	111.21	2002, 2nd Round
Michael van Gerwen	42	114.05	2017, Semi-Final
Gary Anderson	26	108.39	2011, 3rd Round
Luke Littler	16	107.09	2026, 3rd Round
Peter Wright	16	105.86	2020, Quarter-Final
Adrian Lewis	15	106.51	2010, 1st Round
Raymond van Barneveld	13	109.34	2017, Semi-Final
Michael Smith	13	106.32	2022, 2nd Round
Rob Cross	7	107.67	2018, Final
Dave Chisnall	7	107.34	2021, Quarter-Final
Stephen Bunting	7	107.28	2024, 2nd Round
Simon Whitlock	7	105.37	2010, Quarter-Final
Luke Humphries	6	108.74	2026, Quarter-Final
Dimitri Van den Bergh	6	105.61	2021, 2nd Round
Gerwyn Price	5	104.20	2020, 3rd Round
Chris Dobey	5	103.09	2024, 2nd Round

Ten highest tournament averages (min 3 matches)
Average	Player	Year	Round (+ result)	Reference
106.37	Michael van Gerwen	2017	Final (won)	
104.68	Michael van Gerwen	2016	3rd Round	
104.63	Phil Taylor	2010	Final (won)	
104.19	Adrian Lewis	2010	Quarter-Final	
104.08	Phil Taylor	2009	Final (won)	
104.05	Michael van Gerwen	2018	Semi-Final	
103.98	Luke Littler	2026	Final (won)	
103.64	Michael van Gerwen	2021	Quarter-Final	
103.45	Gary Anderson	2017	Final (loss)	
103.38	Michael van Gerwen	2019	Final (won)	

Note: Tournament averages above were calculated by summing the match averages of a player by the number of matches. This does not take into account the length of the matches. The true three dart average is defined by three times the "total points scored" divided by the "number of darts used". The real 2017 tournament average for Michael van Gerwen was 107.06.

=== Records ===
Most titles: 14, Phil Taylor. Taylor's two BDO titles take his total to 16, a record across both organisations.
Most finals: 19, Phil Taylor, 1994–2007, 2009–2010, 2013, 2015 and 2018. Taylor's two BDO finals take his total to 21, a record across both organisations.
Most match wins: 110, Phil Taylor, 1994–2018. Taylor has only lost 11 matches at the tournament and reached every final from 1994 until 2007, before being beaten in the quarter-finals by Wayne Mardle in 2008.
Longest unbeaten run: 44 matches, Phil Taylor, 1995–2003, between his defeats in the 1994 and 2003 finals.
Most 180s in a tournament (total): 1,127 (2026).
Most 180s in a tournament (individual): 83, Michael Smith (2022)
Most 180s in a match: 24, Peter Wright (2022 semi-final) and Michael Smith (2022 final)
Most 180s in a match (both players): 42, Gary Anderson (22) and Michael van Gerwen (20) (2017 final)
Longest streak of 100+ averages: 19 matches, Michael van Gerwen, 2016–2019
Highest Average for one set: 140.91, Luke Littler, 2nd round 2025 championship.
Most appearances: 25, Phil Taylor.
Youngest player: Mitchell Clegg, 16 years and 37 days in 2007. Clegg had qualified as a 15-year-old. He was younger than Michael van Gerwen, who set the BDO World Championship youngest player record a few weeks later.
Youngest finalist: Luke Littler, 16 years and 347 days in the 2024 final. Littler was 4 years and 106 days younger than Kirk Shepherd, who reached the final in 2008.
Record TV audience UK: 3.71 million (2024 final)
Record TV audience outside UK: 3.10 million peak viewership and 2.19 million average viewership (2025 Final). The record was set during the German broadcast (Sport1) of the 2025 final between Michael van Gerwen and Luke Littler.
Won both World Championships: Four players. Dennis Priestley was the first player to win both versions of the World Championship, winning the 1991 BDO Championship and the 1994 PDC Championship. Phil Taylor, John Part and Raymond van Barneveld have since matched the feat.
Overseas World Champions: Three players. John Part was the first player from outside the UK to win the PDC World Championship with his 2003 title, followed by Raymond van Barneveld in 2007 and Michael van Gerwen in 2014. Part was also the first overseas player to win the BDO title, doing so in 1994.
Youngest World Champion: Luke Littler was 17 years 11 months and 13 days when he won his first world title in 2025.
Oldest World Champion: Phil Taylor was 52 years and 5 months old when he won his last world title in 2013.
Oldest Player to win a match: Paul Lim was 71 years and 323 days when he won a match in 2026 event.
Youngest Player to win a match: Luke Littler was 16 years and 333 days when he won a match in 2024 event.

== Media ==
=== Domestic broadcaster ===
The PDC World Championship has been broadcast live and in its entirety by Sky Sports in the UK since its inception. Since 2009 the tournament has been presented in High Definition (HD). Their coverage is currently presented from a studio overlooking the interior of the Alexandra Palace venue.

The current presenting team is as follows:

Presenters:

- Emma Paton: (2020–present)
- Anna Woolhouse: (2022–present)
- Michael Bridge: (2023–present)

Commentators:

- Stuart Pyke: (2003–present)
- Rod Studd: (2009–present)
- Dan Dawson: (2022–present)
- Abi Davies: (2024–present)

Co-commentators/pundits:

- Wayne Mardle: (2010–2024; 2025–present)
- John Part: (2013–present)
- Mark Webster: (2018–present)
- Laura Turner: (2019–present)
- Glen Durrant: (2023–present)

Former presenters and commentators have been:

- Dave Lanning: (1993–2010; 2013)
- John Gwynne: (1993–2013; 2016)
- Sid Waddell: (1994–2012)
- Jeff Stelling: (1993–2002; 2005)
- David Bobin: (1994; 2002–2003)
- Helen Chamberlain: (2003–2009)
- Jonathan Green: (2000)
- Laure James (2014–2016)
- Eric Bristow: (1993–2016)
- Dave Clark: (2001–2020)
- Colin Lloyd: (2020)
- Rod Harrington: (2005–2020)
- Nigel Pearson (2006–2022)
- David Croft: (2013–2021)
- Laura Woods: (2018–2022)
- Devon Petersen: (2019–2022)
- Adam Smith: (2020–2022)
- Corrine Hammond: (2022–2023)

=== Overseas broadcasters ===
Dutch broadcaster SBS6, having covered the BDO World Darts Championship for many years, also covered the event until RTL7 took over broadcasting. TV3 Sport (Denmark), Fox Sports (Australia), TSN (Canada), SuperSport (South Africa), Sky Sport (New Zealand), StarHub (Singapore), Ten Sports (India), CCTV (China), Showtime (Middle East), Ukraine TV, Canal+ (Poland), NOVA Sport (Czech Republic and Slovakia), Sport1 (Germany, Hungary), Meersat (Malaysia), 7TV (Russia), Measat (Indonesia), J Sports (Japan), DAZN (Italy), ESPN (USA), GOL TV (Spain) Eurosport (Romania), Viaplay (Iceland) and VTM4 (Belgium) now also broadcast the event.

=== Viewing figures ===
Television viewing figures for the final are as follows:

Year	Broadcaster		
Year	Sky UK	Germany SPORT1	Netherlands
2026	2,500,000 peak		
2025			
2024	3.68 million peak	2.86 million peak	
2023		2,360,000	
2022	1,490,000	1,650,000	
2021	1,000,000	1,550,000	
2020	1,006,553	1,590,000	1,200,000 (RTL 7)
2019	658,300	1,490,000	1,540,000 (RTL 7)
2018	1,400,000	2,150,000	864,000 (RTL 7)
2017	607,000	1,480,000	2,170,000 (RTL 7)
2016	908,000	950,000	869,000 (RTL 7)
2015	1.5 million peak	1,360,000	908,000 (RTL 7)
2014	668,000	560,000	2,054,000 (RTL 7)
2013	1,270,000	810,000	1,748,000 (RTL 7)
2012	728,000		762,000 (RTL 7)
2011	920,000		435,000 (SBS6)
2010	888,000	730,000	854,000 (SBS6)
2009	809,000	490,000	1,441,000 (SBS6)
2008	731,000	340,000	211,000 (compilation SBS6)
2007	1,028,000		1,339,000 (SBS6)
2006	761,000		
2005	530,000		
2004	820,000		
2003	610,000		
2002	Unavailable		
2001	420,000		
2000	240,000		
1999	200,000		

=== Webcasting ===
The PDC world championship events are now broadcast on video.pdc.tv which shows the events live, highlights and also classic matches. This website is a subscription only viewing and is limited to certain territorial restrictions.

=== Video games ===
The PDC have worked with various video game developers since 2006 to create a number of darts-themed titles based on the World Darts Championship tournament.

Their first game PDC World Championship Darts was developed by Mere Mortals for the PlayStation 2 and PC. The second game in the series was PDC World Championship Darts 2008 developed by Mere Mortals for the PlayStation 2, PC, PlayStation Portable, Wii and Xbox 360. A year later Rebellion Developments took over development of the series, releasing PDC World Championship Darts 2009 for the Wii and Nintendo DS.

The most recent PDC World Darts Championship console game to be released was PDC World Championship Darts Pro Tour a darts video game for the PlayStation 3, Wii and Xbox 360. This game is the most comprehensive of the series featuring ten professional players and five official PDC tournaments including the PDC World Grand Prix, Las Vegas Desert Classic, PDC UK Open and the Holland Open.

In 2021 the PDC collaborated with Blueprint Gaming to develop PDC World Darts Championship, an officially licensed slots game available to play on mobile devices and PC, the game was released in February 2021.

== Sponsor ==
The tournament has been sponsored by bookmaker Paddy Power since 2024. Previous sponsors have been:

- Skol (1994)
- Proton Cars (1995)
- Vernon's Pools (1996)
- Red Band (1997)
- Skol (1998–2002)
- Ladbrokes (2003–2014)
- William Hill (2015–2022)
- Cazoo (2023)
- Paddy Power (2024–)

== Trophy ==
Following popular darts commentator Sid Waddell's death on 11 August 2012, the decision was made to rename the champion's trophy to the Sid Waddell trophy from the 2013 tournament onwards.
