= Shadow of the Beast (1989 video game) =

Platform game

- Cover art by Roger Dean
- Developer: Reflections
- Publisher: Psygnosis
- Producers: Martin Edmondson; Paul Howarth
- Designers: Martin Edmondson; Paul Howarth
- Programmer: Paul Howarth
- Artist: Martin Edmondson
- Composer: David Whittaker
- Platforms: Amiga, Atari ST, Amstrad CPC, Commodore 64, ZX Spectrum, Mega Drive, FM Towns, Atari Lynx, Master System, PC Engine CD
- Release: 1989 (Amiga); 1990-1992 (ports)
- Genre: Platform
- Mode: Single-player

Shadow of the Beast is a platform game developed by Reflections and published in 1989 by Psygnosis for the Amiga. It was ported to several other systems. The game was known for its graphics, with many colours on screen and up to twelve levels of parallax scrolling backdrops, and for its atmospheric score composed by David Whittaker that used high-quality instrument samples.

It was followed by two sequels, Shadow of the Beast II in 1990 and Shadow of the Beast III in 1992. The series was acquired by Sony Interactive Entertainment through Psygnosis, with Heavy Spectrum Entertainment Labs developing a remake, which was released for the PlayStation 4 in May 2016.

== Gameplay ==
The core gameplay of Shadow of the Beast is that of a basic action side-scroller. The player guides Aarbron through the world, fighting monsters of varying frequency with a small variety of attacks, which is slowly improved over the course of the game. Aarbron starts the game by punching enemies, eventually using attacks like fireballs and even a laser gun, each with their own set of basic pros and cons. The gameplay alternates between traversing vast expanses of mostly flat terrain accompanied by a wide range of scenery, and fighting groups of hostile monsters, similar to a beat-em-up game. At spaced-out, fixed points in the world, the player will encounter a boss, which must be defeated to proceed further.

== Plot ==
A man named Aarbron is kidnapped as a child and corrupted through magic into a monstrous warrior-servant for the evil beast lord Maletoth. The creature's memory of his human life returns when he watches a man being executed, whom he later recognizes as his father. This prompts Aarbron to seek revenge on Maletoth. A long arduous journey ensues, with Aarbron forced to battle his way through both hostile terrain and Maletoth's forces. He eventually confronts one of Maletoth's minions, a gargantuan creature whose only visible body parts are its hand and foot. Defeating the creature, Aarbron is freed from his curse, the eponymous "Shadow of the Beast", and returned to a more humanoid form.

== Development ==
Shadow of the Beast was designed by Martin Edmondson and Paul Howarth of Reflections over the course of nine months, and it was their second 16-bit game after their previous game, Ballistix. Edmondson and Howarth described it as their "most ambitious project to date", and stated that they wanted the game to push both the Amiga and Atari ST to their technical limits. To achieve this, the Amiga version was written first, so that they would take advantage of all of the computer's advanced hardware capabilities. The developers made use of the hardware sprites and scrolling rather than using the blitter, which they felt that the blitter "does not run quite as fast as some people would believe." To get the speed they wanted, the developers employed difficult techniques such as the sprite multiplexing. The game uses up to twelve levels of parallax scrolling, and up to a maximum of 128 colours on screen.

The game was also designed to be as difficult as possible; Edmondson remarked that he liked difficult games at the time and he "used to get frustrated if the game was too easy." The game's cover art was designed by British artist Roger Dean, who has also done cover artwork for other Psygnosis-published games. The music for Shadow of the Beast was composed by David Whittaker. Whittaker wrote six main pieces of music, with each piece containing its own sub-theme, to "fit the changing scenes in the game." The instruments were made using the Korg M1 synthesiser and then sampled at 20 kHz. Ruben Monteiro's arrangement of the game's music was released in 1999, on an Amiga music compilation album Immortal.

In an interview with The One regarding Shadow of the Beast III's development, the team behind Beast III noted the original Shadow of the Beast's selling point was its graphics, and Edmondson stated that "It was definitely a case of being in the right place at the right time. Apart from how many colours and layers of parallax and monsters we could squeeze on screen, no thought went into it whatsoever", and furthermore called Shadow of the Beast a "graphics showcase". In regards to Beast I's parallax scrolling, Edmondson expressed "In Beast I, we chose the most obvious and the easiest way of doing it, but the problem with that was you couldn't have monsters running over the foreground at the same time. They had to be very spaced out and nowhere near interesting parts of the map." Beast III reused no assets from the first two games, with Edmondson stating in regards to Beast I that "the original code for Beast I was so bad. It was the first thing we really did seriously and when you look back on it, it's very slow and inefficient and could have been done 10 times better."

Shadow of the Beast was released in 1989 by Psygnosis. It was initially retailed for £35, and was bundled with a T-shirt. It has been ported to various other platforms since its original release. It was ported to the Atari ST by Eldritch the Cat. It was ported to the ZX Spectrum and the Amstrad CPC by Gremlin Graphics, to the TurboGrafx-16's Super CD-ROM² System and the Commodore 64 by DMA Design, to the Mega Drive by WJS Design, to the Atari Lynx by Digital Developments, to the Master System by TecMagik, and to the FM Towns by Tim Ansell of Creative Assembly. An Atari 8-bit version was in development in 1990 to be published by Harlequin, but it was never finished due to collapse of the company. A port for the Super Nintendo Entertainment System titled Super Shadow of the Beast was shown at the 1992 Summer Consumer Electronics Show, and it was planned to be released by Information Global Service, however it never materialized. The Mega Drive and Super CD-ROM² versions of Shadow of the Beast were released in Japan by Victor Musical Industries on 27 March 1992. The FM Towns and Super CD-ROM² versions feature a soundtrack arranged by Chris Howlett and Ian Henderson of DC Productions.

== Reception ==
Reception

Review scores
| Publication | Score |
|---|---|
| Electronic Gaming Monthly | 7/10, 8/10, 7/10, 7/10 (Lynx) |
| Famitsu | 20/40 (Mega Drive); 18/40 (PC Engine) |
| GameFan | 168/200 (PC Engine) |
| Dragon | 5/5 (Amiga) |
| Sega Pro | 90/100 (Master System) |

Award
| Publication | Award |
|---|---|
| Crash | Crash Smash |

Shadow of the Beast and Shadow of the Beast II were reviewed in 1991 in Dragon where both games got 5 out of 5 stars. Sega Pro praised the Master System version for its graphics and sound, but criticised the "awkward" controls method.

In a retrospective article for Digital Spy, Mark Langshaw remarked that Shadow of the Beast "will always be remembered as one of many jewels in the crown of Studio Liverpool." Langshaw however said that the Mega Drive version was considered inferior to other versions, and because of its poor conversion rate, the game ran faster than intended on the North American Genesis console and "went from unforgiving to near impossible." Travis Fahs of IGN considered the FM Towns port a superior version of the game.

In 1996, Computer Gaming World declared Shadow of the Beast the 76th-best computer game ever released.

== Remake ==
A re-imagined version of Shadow of the Beast was revealed at Gamescom 2013, developed by Heavy Spectrum Entertainment Labs and released by Sony Interactive Entertainment for the PlayStation 4 in May 2016. The original Amiga version is included along with the remake.

== References in other games ==
Graphics from Shadow of the Beast and Shadow of the Beast II were featured in two special levels in the original Lemmings game (Amiga, Mega Drive, PC, Super NES, and Atari ST versions), called "A Beast of a Level" and "A Beast II of a Level". These references were supported by cameo versions of the title music from each version, in this case both pieces were arranged by Tim Wright.
