= Super truck =

Super truck may refer to:

- Hyundai Super Truck
- Stadium Super Trucks
- Super Trucks Racing, a video game, also released in Europe as Super Trucks
- Trophy truck or supertruck, a vehicle used in high-speed off-road racing
- GMC Hummer EV, "world's first all-electric supertruck"
- SuperUtes Series, Australian pickup truck racing competition
- NASCAR SuperTruck Series
- High performance pickup trucks
