= Valcon Games =

Defunct American video game developer

- Type: Private
- Industry: Video games
- Predecessor: Kemco USA
- Founded: March 1, 2005; 21 years ago
- Founder: Colin Gordon; Glenn Halseth
- Defunct: 2011
- Headquarters: Bellevue, Washington, United States

Valcon Games is a small publisher based in Redmond, Washington. The company was founded by Colin Gordon and Glenn Halseth, formerly of Kemco, in 2005 and primarily focuses on localizing and publishing games that have been overlooked in the North American market. They have not released any new games since 2011 and their web site now simply redirects to Google. It is possible the company is no longer operating.

== History ==
The company begins operations on March 1, 2005, by former members of Kemco's American team, including Colin Gordon and Glenn Halseth. The company's intention was to sell games for budget prices.

On May 15, 2005, Valcon Games decided to acquire exclusive North American publishing rights for the critically acclaimed European PlayStation 2 title TT Superbikes from Jester Interactive. On May 27, 2005, Valcon Games acquires exclusive North American publishing rights for the classic platform game James Pond 2: Codename RoboCod from Gameware Ltd.

Later in 2005, the company announced the title Bode Miller Alpine Skiing, set for a 2006 release on the PlayStation 2, which was a success for the company.

On June 6, 2006, Valcon Games announces an original IP, Ultimate Board Game Collection. The game is a massive hit, becoming the best-selling title from the company. In 2007, the company teamed up with Empire Interactive to secure the European game publishing and distribution rights to the title Ultimate Board Game Collection.

In 2009, the company made a bigger deal in racing entertainment when the company released Ski-Doo Snowmobile Challenge. The company also made attention to releasing History's Greatest Empires: Rome, which was released for the Nintendo DS in 2009. Also in 2009, the company released another title Easy Piano, for the Nintendo DS, set for release in 2010. The company ended up shuttering its doors in 2011 due to poor sales of the company's titles in an oversaturated market.

== Games Released ==
Game Title	Year Released	System
Adventures of Shuggy	2010	Xbox 360 (XBLA)
Alfa Romeo Racing Italiano	2006	PlayStation 2
Bode Miller Alpine Skiing	2006	PlayStation 2
Chime	2010	Xbox 360 (Xbox Live Arcade)
Corvette Evolution GT	2006	Nintendo DS, PlayStation 2
Crazy Frog Racer 2	2007	PlayStation 2
Dai Senryaku VII: Exceed	2007	PlayStation 2
Darkest of Days	2009	Xbox 360
Easy Piano	2010	Nintendo DS
Greed Corp	2010	Xbox 360 (XBLA)
Hannspree Ten Kate Honda: SBK-07 Superbike World Championship	2008	PlayStation 2, PlayStation Portable
History's Great Empires: Rome	2009	Nintendo DS
Horse Life Adventures	2010	Nintendo DS, Wii
James Pond: Codename Robocod	2005	Game Boy Advance
Master Jin Jin's IQ Challenge	2007	Nintendo DS
Mountain Bike Adrenaline	2007	PlayStation 2
Ocean Commander	2009	Wii
Offshore Tycoon	2009	Wii
Pirates: Legend of the Black Buccaneer	2006	PlayStation 2
Polar Panic	2010	PlayStation 3 (PSN), Xbox 360 (XBLA)
Raiden Fighters Aces	2009	Xbox 360
Real World Golf	2005	PlayStation 2
Riding Star	2008	PlayStation 2
Shepherd's Crossing	2008	PlayStation 2
Ski-doo Snow X Racing	2007	PlayStation 2
Ski-Doo: Snowmobile Challenge	2009	PlayStation 3, Wii, Xbox 360
Suzuki Super-Bikes II: Riding Challenge	2009	PlayStation 2
Suzuki TT Superbikes	2005	PlayStation 2
Suzuki TT Superbikes Real Road Racing Championship	2009	PlayStation 2
Totally Spies! Totally Party	2009	Wii, PlayStation 2
Ultimate Board Game Collection	2006	PlayStation 2, PlayStation Portable, Wii
