= Real World Golf =

2005 video game

- Developer: In2Games
- Publishers: EU: Valcon Games; NA: Mad Catz; NA: Valcon Games
- Platforms: Windows, PlayStation 2, Xbox
- Release: EU: August 26, 2005 (PS2); EU: November 11, 2005 (PC); NA: April 11, 2006; AU: 2006 (PC, PS2)
- Genre: Sports
- Modes: Single-player, multiplayer

Real World Golf is a video game developed by In2Games. It was published by GameTrak in Europe in 2005 and by Mad Catz and Valcon Games in the U.S. in 2006.

== Reception ==
The game received "mixed or average" reviews according to the review aggregator website Metacritic. Stuart Miles of The Times gave the PlayStation 2 version five stars. Paul Katz of Entertainment Weekly gave the game a B, saying that "while the Gametrak is a techno marvel, it's the video game portion that still needs work." Jason Hill of The Sydney Morning Herald gave the PC and PlayStation 2 versions three out of five, saying that "any golfer will be able to pick up and play in seconds, and the sensation of playing real golf is astonishing. Pity the software simulation is so drab".

Reception

Aggregate score
Aggregator	Score		
Aggregator	PC	PS2	Xbox
Metacritic	N/A	73/100	74/100

Review scores
Publication	Score		
Publication	PC	PS2	Xbox
Edge	N/A	5/10	N/A
Game Informer	N/A	7/10	N/A
GameSpot	N/A	6/10	6/10
IGN	N/A	7.9/10	7.9/10
Official U.S. PlayStation Magazine	N/A	3.5/5	N/A
Official Xbox Magazine (US)	N/A	N/A	8.5/10
PC Gamer (US)	80%	N/A	N/A
TeamXbox	N/A	N/A	7.5/10
VideoGamer.com	N/A	6/10	N/A
Entertainment Weekly	N/A	B	B
The Times	N/A	5/5	N/A
