= PDC World Championship Darts 2009 =

2009 video game

- Wii box art
- Developer(s): Rebellion Developments
- Publisher(s): EU: Oxygen
- Platform(s): Nintendo DS, Wii
- Release: PAL: May 29, 2009; NA: June 16, 2009 (DS)
- Genre(s): Sports
- Mode(s): Single-player, multiplayer

PDC World Championship Darts 2009 is a sports video game, published by Oxygen and developed and designed by Rebellion Developments. It was released exclusively on Nintendo platforms for the Nintendo DS and Wii on May 29, 2009. The game features eighteen professionals from the Professional Darts Corporation. The game includes a Create-A-Player mode, allowing players to create a female dart player to use in both Career Mode and Exhibition Mode. There is also a practice mode. It is a direct sequel to the previous year's game, PDC World Championship Darts 2008. While the game was primarily aimed at PAL regions, the DS version was released in North America as one of four versions of the localization for Darts 2008 on June 16, 2009.

Among the game's roster are four top world dart players at the time: Phil Taylor, Raymond van Barneveld, Wayne Mardle and James Wade.

A sequel, PDC World Championship Darts Pro Tour, was released in 2010.
