= Music 3000 =

2003 rhythm simulation video game

- Cover art of North American version
- Developer: Jester Interactive
- Publishers: EU: Jester Interactive; NA: XS Games
- Platform: PlayStation 2
- Release: EU: 30 May 2003; NA: 28 July 2004
- Genre: Digital audio workstation

Music 3000 (known in North America as Funkmaster Flex's Digital Hitz Factory) is a music sequencer program and music video game developed and published by Jester Interactive exclusively for PlayStation 2. In North America, it was published by XS Games. The game is a sequel to Music 2000 from 1999. It is the second rhythm game to feature Funkmaster Flex in the title after MTV Music Generator 2.

== Reception ==
Reception

Aggregate score
Aggregator	Score
Metacritic	71/100

Review scores
Publication	Score
Consoles +	88%
Game Informer	6.75/10
IGN	7/10
Jeuxvideo.com	14/20
Official U.S. PlayStation Magazine	4/5
PlayStation: The Official Magazine	7/10

The game received "average" reviews according to the review aggregation website Metacritic. Official U.S. PlayStation Magazine called it "One of the most comprehensive entries in the music-creation genre." IGN said of the game, "The Voice 2 Music feature is enough to merit that purchase by itself." PSM said, "With patience, DHF can deliver with massive funkmaster flexibility." However, Game Informer said that Jester Interactive had "screwed up the once-intuitive interface, replacing it with this monstrosity, which makes everything dependent on using the right analog stick and the clumsy R3 button."
