= Dark Wind =

Dark Wind, Dark Winds, or variants may refer to:

- The Dark Wind, 1982 crime novel by Tony Hillerman
  - The Dark Wind (1991 film), adaptation of the Hillerman novel, directed by Errol Morris
  - Dark Winds, American television series (2022-present) based on Hillerman's works
- Dark Wind, a first-person fighting video game developed for the Gametrak game control system
- Darkwind: War on Wheels, a racing and vehicle combat massively multiplayer online game
- Darkwinds, a Swedish death metal band led by David Parland
- Lord Dark Wind, fictional character in the Marvel Comics universe
