= SBK-07: Superbike World Championship =

2007 video game

- European edition cover
- Developer: Milestone
- Publishers: Black Bean Games (EU); Valcon Games (NA)
- Platforms: PlayStation 2 PlayStation Portable
- Release: PlayStation 2: EU: 18 May 2007; NA: 29 October 2007; AU: 28 June 2007; PlayStation Portable: AU: 28 June 2007; EU: 29 June 2007; NA: 18 March 2008
- Genre: Racing
- Modes: Single-player, multiplayer

SBK-07: Superbike World Championship, also known as Hannspree Ten Kate Honda SBK: Superbike World Championship in North America, is the official Superbike World Championship video game and offers the official races, sessions, teams and riders of the real 2007 Superbike World Championship season. The game allows the player to race in 5 game modes: Quick Race, Time Attack, Race weekend, Championship and Challenges in a variety of difficulties and weather conditions.

The developer and the publisher say that the game aims to capture the attention of core gamers but also appeal to the casual gamers. SBK-07 can be rendered more arcade or simulation by enabling or disabling a series of realism options. Milestone had also developed MotoGP '07.

== Reception ==
SBK-07 holds averages of 70% for the PS2 version and 62% for the PSP version on aggregate website GameRankings. IGN said the PS2 version of the game is mostly the same as Milestones' MotoGP '07 but is a better game. The controls in the PSP version were said to be worse than in the PS2 version.

== See also ==
- MotoGP '07, the concurrent installment of the Moto GP series developed by Milestone for the PlayStation 2
