= Ultimate Board Game Collection =

- Developer: Mere Mortals
- Publisher: Valcon Games
- Platforms: Wii; PlayStation 2 PlayStation 3
- Release: July 5, 2006

Ultimate Board Game Collection is a 2006 video game collection of classic board and tabletop games.

== Games ==
- 3D Tic-Tac-Toe
- Anagrams
- Backgammon
- Checkers
- Chess
- Chinese Checkers
- Concentration
- Dice
- Dominoes
- Enigma
- Go
- Jigsaws
- Mahjong Solitaire
- Mancala
- Naval Battle
- Parcheesi
- Quatro
- Reversi
- Snakes & Ladders
- Word Cubes

== Reception ==
Reception

Review scores
Publication	Score
Eurogamer	5/10
GamesRadar	2/5
IGN	3/10
Jeuxvideo.com	9/20
USA Today	5/10

IGN gave the collection a score of 3 out of 10' stating:"Instead of a compilation of good times, Ultimate Board Game Collection is a horrifying pile of examples of why some developers should spend their time focusing on gameplay instead of showing off their environments. With just a couple of games worth recommending here this is simply not worth your time or money"

The collection sold 200,000 units.
