= Mere Mortals =

UK video game developer

Mere Mortals Ltd
- Company type: Private
- Industry: Video games
- Genre: Video games
- Founded: 1999
- Founder: David Jeffries; Graeme Love
- Headquarters: Newcastle upon Tyne, North East England
- Parent: Independent

Established in 1999, Mere Mortals was a British video game developer based in Newcastle upon Tyne. It announced its withdrawal from games in 2010 and confirmed that decision the next year, intending to work with internet, television and film.

In addition to its games, Mere Mortals contributed to three films by Danny Boyle: Sunshine, 28 Weeks Later and Slumdog Millionaire.

== Games ==
Selected games
Title	Platform(s)	Year	Notes
Aquattack!	PlayStation 3, PSP	2010	
Petanque Master	Wii	2010	Sequel to Petanque Pro. Compatible with the Wii MotionPlus.
Pocket Pack: Words & Numbers	DS	2010	
Pocket Pack: Strategy Games	DS	2010	
Vacation Sports	Wii	2009	
Encleverment Experiment	Xbox 360	2009	
World Sports Party	Wii	2009	
Ski-Doo: Snowmobile Challenge	Wii	2009	
PDC World Championship Darts 2008	PlayStation 2, Wii, PC, PSP, Xbox 360	2008	
Vegas Casino II	PlayStation 2	2007	
Winter Sports	PlayStation 2	2007	
Fruit Fall	PlayStation 2	2007	
Pétanque Pro	Microsoft Windows, PlayStation 2, Wii	2007	
Ultimate Board Game Collection	Wii, PlayStation 2	July 2006	
¡Qué pasa Neng! El videojuego	PlayStation 2	2006	Published by Phoenix Games B.V. & Atari
PDC World Championship Darts	PlayStation 2	December 1, 2006	
X-Treme Quads	PlayStation 2	2006	
Turbo Trucks	PlayStation 2	2006	
The Ultimate World Cup Quiz	PlayStation 2	2006	
Superbike GP	PlayStation 2	2006	
Speed Machines III	PlayStation 2	2006	
Snow Rider	PlayStation 2	2006	
Search & Destroy	PlayStation 2	2006	
Obliterate	PlayStation 2	2006	
Maniac Mole	PlayStation 2	2006	
London Cab Challenge	PlayStation 2	July 28, 2006	Published by Phoenix Games B.V.
Guerrilla Strike	PlayStation 2	2006	
Extreme Sprint 3010	PlayStation 2	2006	Published by Phoenix Games B.V.
Dynamite 100	PlayStation 2	2006	
Drag Racer USA	PlayStation 2	2006	
Downhill Slalom	PlayStation 2	2006	
D-Unit Drift Racing	PlayStation 2	2006	
Combat Ace	PlayStation 2	2006	Published by Phoenix Games B.V.
Air Raid 3	PlayStation 2	2006	
Arcade USA	PlayStation 2, PC	2006	
21 Card Games	PlayStation 2	2006	
Poker Masters	PlayStation 2, PC	2005	
Shadow of Ganymede	PlayStation 2	2005	
Family Board Games	PlayStation 2	2005	
Doomsday Racers	PlayStation 2	2005	
Big Mutha Truckers 2: Truck Me Harder!	PC	2005	
Xtreme Speed	PlayStation 2	2004	
RC Toy Machines	PlayStation 2	2004	
Junior Board Games	PlayStation 2	2004	
Arcade Action: 30 Games	PlayStation 2	2004	
SRS	PC	2004	
All Star Action	PlayStation	2003	
Big Mutha Truckers	PC	2003	
Sports Superbike 2	PlayStation	2002	
Speed Machines	PlayStation	2002	
Monte Carlo Games Compendium	PlayStation	2002	
Backgammon	PlayStation	1999	
