= PDC World Championship Darts =

2006 video game

- PlayStation 2 cover for PDC World Championship Darts, with all 10 professionals shown
- Developer: Mere Mortals
- Publishers: EU: Oxygen Interactive; AU: Red Ant Enterprises
- Platforms: PlayStation 2, PC
- Release: PlayStation 2: EU: 1 December 2006; AU: 1 February 2007; Microsoft Windows: EU: 1 December 2006; AU: 8 February 2007
- Genre: Sports
- Modes: Single-player, multiplayer

PDC World Championship Darts is a sports video game published by Oxygen Interactive and developed and designed by Mere Mortals. It was released for the PlayStation 2 and PC. The game features ten professionals from the Professional Darts Corporation, and five tournaments from the PDC circuit. A sequel, PDC World Championship Darts 2008, was produced the following year.

== Gameplay ==
The game attempts to recreate playing real darts through the functions of the controller and the rules set within the game. A variety of modes are available for play.

=== Rules ===
See also Playing darts and Scoring for full rules

The game almost exactly follows the rules of the classic 501 darts game. Two professionals (one or two controlled by the player) throw darts onto the dartboard to decrease their score to 0, but they must end with a double. The only exception is the World Grand Prix where players must also start with a double. The dartboard's numbers are positioned just as they are in real darts.

Each player throws three darts at a time before the next player's turn. In standard rules, whoever reaches 0 first has won the leg. Varying amounts of legs comprise sets, a certain amount of which must be gained to win the match.

=== Controls ===
After aiming where they want to throw with the right analog stick, the player uses the left analog stick on the DualShock 2 controller or keyboard to pull back their dart and increase the power behind the throw. In 'Amateur' mode the power can be seen with a red bar that fills a power meter; in 'Professional' mode this aid is not present and the power can be seen via the movement of the character's arm. Once the desired amount of power is reached, pushing forward on the analog stick will throw the dart. Any deviation to the left or right while throwing the dart will also affect the dart's flight.

=== Modes ===
There are numerous modes of play within the game. Aside from a simple Exhibition between one or two players, a single player can also create their own character and begin a career to become the world's best dart player. Another mode allows any of the tournaments in career mode to be played individually.

==== Party Games ====
There are 10 party games available to play for two to four players. Instead of using the usual control style where the player manually aims and adjusts their power, all of these games must be played in one of three control mechanisms that generally involve the player confirming where they want to throw at just the right time as the aiming cursor moves around the board. This is to suit the sort of games that party mode contains:

- Standard rules – Players utilise the different control mechanism to reach zero from scores of 301, 501, or 701. They must check out on a double
- Black and White – Player 1 aims for white numbers, Player 2 for black. Players take turns to throw 3 darts at their target number, scoring 1, 2, and 3 points respectively for singles, doubles, and trebles
- Cricket – See article for rules
- Fives – Players throw three darts aiming for a score divisible by 5. If they do they get a fifth of the score in points. Whoever scores 50 points first is the winner
- Killer – Each player has a 'life number'. Every time a player hits their life number they gain a life; when a player obtains three lives they become the Killer. The Killer can use their darts to aim for the opposing player's life number, thereby killing them
- Knockout – Players begin the game with three lives. They take turns to throw three darts at the board, aiming to achieve a higher score than the previous player. If the player fails in this, they lose a life; the game is lost if all lives are lost
- Odd Man In – Players throw three darts at the board aiming for an odd score higher than 10. As soon as they fail to do this they are out of the game
- Round the Clock – Players hit each numbered section in turn, from 1 to 20. The first to reach 20 is the winner. Variations include reverse Round the Clock and hitting the doubles and trebles of each number
- Shanghai – The players throw three darts at a board aiming to hit the single, double, and treble of the same number with those three darts. The winner is the first player to successfully do so
- Twenty One – Players take turns to throw three darts aiming for 10 and 11. A single on either number scores 1 point, a double 2 points, and a treble 3 points. They are only awarded points when at least one dart each hits both the 10 and 11. First player to reach 21 points is the winner

== Professionals ==
Ten professionals are included in the game (listed along with their achievements at the time of production):

A screenshot featuring Peter Manley throwing against Wayne Mardle

- Phil Taylor – 'The Power' – Thirteen-time World Champion and arguably the greatest player of all time
- Raymond van Barneveld – 'The Man/Barney' – Five-time World Champion, including 2007, the year the game coincided with. One of Holland's greatest darts players.
- John Part – 'Darth Maple' – Three-time World Champion (1994, 2003, 2008) and Canada's greatest darts player
- Dennis Priestley – 'The Menace' – Two-time World Champion (1991, 1994).The first ever winner of a PDC World Championship (1994)
- Colin Lloyd – 'Jaws' – World Matchplay Champion (2005) and World Grand Prix (2004) champion
- Peter Manley – 'One Dart' – Las Vegas Desert Classic champion (2003) and three-time World Championship finalist (1999, 2002, 2006)
- Alan Warriner-Little – 'The Iceman' – World Grand Prix champion (2001)
- Mark Dudbridge – 'Flash' – World Championship finalist (2005)
- Wayne Mardle – 'Hawaii 501' – World Championship semi-finalist (2004, 2005, 2006)
- Adrian Lewis – 'Jackpot' – World Matchplay semi-finalist and Taylor's protégé

== Tournaments ==
Five official PDC tournaments are included in the game. They can be played individually or chronologically as in Career mode, and tournament progress can be saved between rounds. All tournaments are standard 501 double-out games except where noted.

- PDC World Darts Championship – The most prestigious tournament. Six rounds of set play as the first player to win 3 legs wins a set
- PDC World Grand Prix – Players are required to hit a double to begin as well as to end the leg. Five rounds of set play with 3 legs to win a set
- Las Vegas Desert Classic – Five rounds, the first round being first to 11 legs while the remaining four are set play format with 5 legs required to win a set
- PDC UK Open – Eight rounds of 301 games. The tournament is matchplay format ranging from first to 5 legs to first to 17 legs in the final
- Holland Open – Five rounds played in matchplay format ranging from first to 3 legs in the opening round to first to 15 legs in the final
