= Pocket Music =

2002 video game

- Game Boy Color cover art
- Developer: Jester Interactive
- Publisher: Rage Games
- Platforms: Game Boy Advance, Game Boy Color
- Release: EU: 26 April 2002
- Genre: Music

Pocket Music is a 2002 video game developed by Jester Interactive and published by Rage Games for the Game Boy Color and Game Boy Advance. The game is a handheld adaptation of the Music series of games released by the developer, and allows players to create tracks of music from pre-recorded samples using a grid-based interface.

== Gameplay ==
A screenshot of gameplay in the Game Boy Advance version of Pocket Music, displaying the user interface used to create tracks.

Pocket Music is a music game that resembles a basic music tracker, allowing players to compose tracks of music to a maximum of five and a half minutes. Tracks are composed using pre-recorded samples, with 600 on the Game Boy Advance version and 150 for the Game Boy Color. Samples are categorised into six categories by genre, including drum and bass, techno and breakbeat. Players compose tracks by placing the samples upon a grid with a maximum of six channels playing at once. The Riff Editor allows players to use the samples to change the order of notes in a sample and add effects. The Game Boy Color version allows players to trade songs across devices using the Game Link Cable. Pocket Music has a number of pre-programmed tracks saved to showcase the capabilities of the game, including a version of "My Name Is" by Eminem. The game also features six different skins to customise the appearance of the user interface.

== Development and release ==
Rage Games showcased Pocket Music at E3 in May 2001, and was previewed by major publications including IGN and Edge. The game was originally intended for release in Q4 2001. The game is not to be confused with Pocket Music, a working title for an unreleased rhythm game showcased by Nintendo at the Tokyo Game Show in March and April 2001. The Game Boy Color version does not work when played on a Game Boy Advance, one of the few games to do so, along with Chee-Chai Alien.

The source code for the Game Boy Color version of Pocket Music was leaked on 23 February 2022, including an unreleased build for localisation of the game in North America.

== Reception ==
Reception

Review scores
Publication	Score	
Publication	GBA	GBC
AllGame		3/5
Nintendo Official Magazine	80%	
Advance	83%	
Game Boy Xtreme	72%	64%
Nintendo GameCube Magazine UK	5/5	
Total Game Boy	88%	89%

Pocket Music received positive critical reception, with many reviewers praising the novelty innovation involved with porting music creation software to the Game Boy. Nintendo GameCube Magazine praised the game as "a sprawling, ingeniously designed songwriting package" and a "jaw-dropping achievement". Nintendo Official Magazine found the game to be accessible yet complex, praising the game's "choice and flexibility of sound", and noting "the grid system and menus work a treat, making what could have been a nightmare into a pleasure to use". Dave Perrett of Advance praised the game as "the first time that anything like it has been available for the Game Boy Advance, stating that it was a "fun little music maker".

However, some positive reviewers found fault with the game's audio quality and limitations of the audio design features. Nintendo Official Magazine stated the sound quality was a "major let down" as it was "too low and it gets worse if you're listening in noisy conditions". Dave Perrett of Advance stated "There are serious limitations to what you can achieve with this game. Your tunes can only be five and a half minutes long, and you can only have six different sounds playing at the same time." Jamie Wilks of Game Boy Xtreme also noted that "you can only utilise the supplied samples" with few other music-making features, assessing that "Pocket Music's simplicity and limitations mean that a proper musician will show little interest".

Many critics compared the features of the Game Boy Advance and Game Boy Color version. Jem Roberts of Total Game Boy preferred the Game Boy Color version, stating "utterly insanely, despite the fact the Game Boy Color version... obviously has far lower sound and visual quality, it is the only version that allows you to trade your songs via the link cable! Why this crucial option never made it to the far better Advance version is a mystery, and it's a major drawback." Ian Osborne of Game Boy Xtreme gave a higher score to the Game Boy Color version, despite "the differences in audio quality", "because, given the extreme differences in power between the two handhelds, it's the Color version that squeezes the most from its host", observing that the "Color's sound capabilities are stretched to the max".
