= MinDStorm =

2006 video game

- Developer: ASK
- Publishers: JP: ASK; NA: Valcon Games; PAL: 505 Games
- Platform: Nintendo DS
- Release: JP: September 1, 2006; EU: May 18, 2007; AU: August 16, 2007; NA: October 8, 2007
- Genre: Educational
- Mode: Single-player

MinDStorm, known in Japan as Akiyama Jin Kyouju Kanshuu: Zennou JinJin (秋山仁教授監修 全脳JINJIN), is an educational video game published and developed by ASK for the Nintendo DS video game console. It was first released in Japan on September 1, 2006, and was released on May 4, 2007, in Europe. MinDStorm was released under the name Master Jin Jin's IQ Challenge in North America and was released on October 8, 2007.

== Gameplay ==
The player is given four major options:

- Difficulty mode, which gives a sequence of training games according to difficulty.
- Single training game to play.
- Unlock several (non-interactive) games.
- See the player's current level in many different areas.

By gaining in-game levels, the player gains access to more (non-interactive) games, complete with their solution, to be unlocked later on.
