= MTV Music Generator 3 =

2004 video game

MTV Music Generator 3: This Is the Remix
- North American PlayStation 2 cover art featuring on the left side of the cover from top, middle left, middle right, to bottom, Sean Paul, Big Boi and Andre 3000 of OutKast, and Fabolous.
- Developer: Mixmax
- Release: EU: June 18, 2004; NA: June 22, 2004
- Platform: PlayStation 2, Xbox
- Type: Digital audio workstation

MTV Music Generator 3: This Is the Remix, known in Europe as simply MTV Music Generator 3, is a music sequencer program developed by Mixmax and published by Codemasters for PlayStation 2 and Xbox in 2004. It is the sequel of MTV Music Generator 2, published by the same company.

== Soundtrack ==
MTV Music Generator 3: This Is the Remix features a soundtrack consisting of 10 songs.

Song	Artist	Year
"Flawless"	The Ones	1999
"From tha Chuuuch to da Palace"	Snoop Dogg	2003
"Get Busy"	Sean Paul	2003
"Hear Me"	Mike Koglin	2004
"Ill Type Sound"	Krafty Kuts	2001
"Katja"	Carl Cox	2004
"LK"	DJ Marky	2002
"Revolution"	Arthur Smith	2001
"The Way You Move"	Outkast	2003
"This Is My Party"	Fabolous	2003

== Reception ==
Reception

Aggregate score
Aggregator	Score	
Aggregator	PS2	Xbox
Metacritic	79/100	79/100

Review scores
Publication	Score	
Publication	PS2	Xbox
Game Informer	8/10	8/10
GamePro	4.5/5	4.5/5
GameSpy	3/5	3/5
GamesTM	7/10	7/10
GameZone	N/A	8.6/10
IGN	8.8/10	8.8/10
Official U.S. PlayStation Magazine	3.5/5	N/A
Official Xbox Magazine (US)	N/A	8/10
PlayStation: The Official Magazine	8/10	N/A
TeamXbox	N/A	9/10
The Times	4/5	4/5

MTV Music Generator 3 received "generally favorable reviews" on both platforms according to the review aggregation website Metacritic.
