= MotoGP '07 (PS2) =

2007 video game

- UK cover
- Developer: Milestone
- Publisher: Capcom
- Platform: PlayStation 2
- Release: EU: October 1, 2007; NA: October 23, 2007; AU: October 24, 2007; JP: November 1, 2007
- Genre: Racing
- Modes: Single-player, multiplayer

MotoGP '07 is the fifth game of the MotoGP game series for the PlayStation 2 and the first published by Capcom.

== Features ==
The game features all the official riders, tracks, teams and bikes of the 2007 MotoGP season, including the Ilmor Ilmor SRT. The game allows the player to race in 5 game modes: Quick Race, Time Attack, Championship, Challenges and Multiplayer in a variety of difficulties and weather conditions.

According to the publisher the game offers challenging weather effects, accurate physics models based on real data and sound effects recorded from real MotoGP bikes.

== Xbox 360 and PC version ==
In 2007 Capcom purchased the "PlayStation format rights" for MotoGP previously owned by Namco through 2012. The Xbox 360 and PC format rights belong to THQ. Though the PS2 and the Xbox 360/PC games have the same title and are based on the 2007 MotoGP season the games are not related.

In 2013, Milestone returned to making the MotoGP game in their own right, a pattern which continues to this day.

== Reception ==
Reception

Aggregate score
Aggregator	Score
Metacritic	62/100

Review scores
Publication	Score
Famitsu	29/40
GamesMaster	76%
GameSpot	6.5/10
GameSpy	3/5
GameZone	6.5/10
IGN	5.5/10
PlayStation Official Magazine – UK	(OPS2) 8/10; 5/10
PlayStation: The Official Magazine	3.5/5
PSM3	70%
X-Play	3/5

The game received "mixed" reviews according to the review aggregation website Metacritic. In Japan, Famitsu gave it a score of three sevens and one eight for a total of 29 out of 40.

== See also ==
- SBK-07: Superbike World Championship, the contemporary installment of the Superbike World Championship series developed by Milestone for Sony platforms
