= Manx TT Super Bike =

1995 video game

- European Saturn box art
- Developers: Sega AM3; Sega-AM4 (Note: Saturn version developed by Tantalus Interactive; Windows version developed by Psygnosis.)
- Publisher: Sega (Note: Released for the Saturn under the Sega Sports banner.)
- Directors: Jun Uriu; Shinichi Fujii
- Producer: Tetsuya Mizuguchi
- Designers: Takahiro Kajimoto; Kyoushi Ieizumi; Takeo Iwase; Satoru Okano; Masaru Takano; Nachiyo Kamogawa; Shinichi Fujii
- Programmers: Takeshi Goden; Toshikazu Goi; Kazumasa Kondo
- Platforms: Arcade, Sega Saturn, Windows
- Release: November 1995: Arcade; JP: November 1995; NA: 19 December 1995; EU: January 1996 Saturn; JP: 14 March 1997; EU: 20 March 1997; NA: 29 July 1997 Windows; JP: 25 January 1997; NA: August 1997; EU: 5 December 1997
- Genre: Racing
- Modes: Single player, multiplayer
- Arcade system: Sega Model 2

Manx TT Super Bike is a 1995 arcade racing game developed jointly by Sega AM3 and Sega-AM4. It is a motorcycle racing game built for the Sega Model 2 arcade board. Up to 8 players can race in this game if enough arcade cabinets are linked together, following on from Daytona USA. It was later ported to the Sega Saturn by Tantalus Interactive and to Windows by Perfect Entertainment.

The game's setting is the Isle of Man TT - the world-famous and demanding motorcycle racing event held on the Isle of Man. There are two courses to race on: the Laxey Coast course for novices and the more difficult TT ("Tourist Trophy") Course for veteran players. While the TT Course is based on the actual course on the Isle of Man, the Laxey Coast is a fictional course designed by the game developers, though its scenery is drawn from the Isle of Man.

The arcade game was known at the time for its impressive graphics and innovative cabinet. Many arcade motorcycle games incorporated a bike-like machine that tilted so the player could maneuver the on-screen bike through the physical "bike" (pioneered by another Sega game, Hang-On); to do this, the player would need to push their feet against the floor. The Manx TT machine, however, was sensitive enough to tilt just from the rider shifting their weight, allowing the player to keep their feet on the machine and use their body weight to control the on-screen bike, making the game feel more realistic. The game was a hit in arcades across the world.

Sega's decision to entrust the Saturn port of Manx TT Super Bike to an external developer, particularly one with no experience in porting arcade games, was controversial. However, upon release the game proved to be a major critical success for the Saturn. Motor Raid, a futuristic Sega Model 2 motorcycle racing game, was released as an arcade conversion kit for the Manx TT Super Bike arcade cabinet in 1997.

== Development ==
Producer Tetsuya Mizuguchi recounted the impetus behind the game:

After Sega Rally, I wanted to make a game with a big graphic impact that used the player's body. Looking through a magazine, I saw an article about the Isle of Man and I found the island very beautiful - perfect for a nice racing game. Moreover, in Japan there are groups of bikers who love riding bikes on the open road. I wanted to make a bike game mixing these two elements.

The in-game motorcycles resemble the team Honda/Castrol Honda RVF750 RC45. In making the game, AM3 consulted the motorcycle racing team Castrol/Honda Racing Corporation, who helped them on a number of points, including studies on where sound comes from on a motorcycle and how it travels to the ear of the rider. The team determined that they needed four sound outputs to recreate this experience realistically. Because the Model 2 arcade board has only two sound outputs, they used a Model 1 sound board for the additional two sound outputs.

Because it takes more polygons to render a motorcycle than to render a car with a similar level of detail, AM3's wish for the game to support up to eight players presented processing difficulties. They opted to limit the bikes to a relatively small number of polygons so that the game could support eight players without suffering slowdown.

The game was first demonstrated at the 1995 Japanese Amusement Machine Manufacturers' Association show; the game was described as only 20% complete at this time, with just one course playable.

Gaming fans and journalists assumed that the Saturn version of the game would be developed by the same internal Sega CS team which handled the Saturn conversion of Sega Rally Championship, but the team was busy with Daytona USA: Championship Circuit Edition, which Sega considered a more important release. Sega instead assigned the port to third party developer Tantalus Interactive, though several personnel from Sega of Japan assisted Tantalus towards the end of development. The assignment came to Tantalus in an indirect manner; Sega initially gave the job of both Saturn and Windows ports to Psygnosis, which contracted them out to Perfect Entertainment and Tantalus.

In a February 1997 interview with Sega Saturn Magazine, arcade developer Shinichi Fujii discussed the challenges of adapting Manx TT Super Bike for the Saturn. He explained that the original arcade game had been designed around the physical experience of riding a motorcycle, which could not be fully reproduced using conventional home-console controls. Fujii praised the work undertaken on the Saturn conversion, expressing satisfaction with the finished adaptation.

== Release ==
The Saturn version includes an Arcade Mode recreating the original game and a separate Saturn Mode featuring additional content. The latter expands the original Laxey Coast and TT Course tracks with reverse-mirrored variations, bringing the total to four courses, and offers eight selectable motorcycles with differing handling characteristics. Additional modes include Practice, Time Trial and Challenge, in which players progress through the courses in sequence. The conversion also supports two-player races using a horizontally split screen, unlike the linked-cabinet multiplayer of the arcade version. The Saturn and PC releases have the game soundtrack as standard Red Book audio which can be listened to in any CD player.

=== Saturn to PC conversion ===
The PC conversion, based on the Saturn game, offered enhancements to the visuals and gameplay modes.

- Full bike shadows instead of the mesh effect shadow in the Saturn version.
- Perspective correction to remove polygon warping.
- Increased draw distance.
- Higher resolution than the arcade version.
- 3dFx compatibility for filtered textures.
- 8 player multiplayer, like the arcade game.
- Newer voices.

== Reception ==
Contemporary reviews

Review scores
Publication	Score	
Publication	Arcade	Saturn
Consoles +		90%
Computer and Video Games	5/5	
Electronic Gaming Monthly		13.5/20
GameSpot		6.3/10
Hyper		70%
Next Generation	5/5	4/5
Saturn Power		92%
Sega Saturn Magazine		91%

Retrospective reception

Aggregate score
Aggregator	Score	
Aggregator	Arcade	Saturn
GameRankings		64.1% (5 reviews)

Review score
Publication	Score	
Publication	Arcade	Saturn
AllGame	4/5	3.5/5

=== Arcade ===
Following a strong audience reaction at the Amusement Trades Exhibition International (ATEI) show in January 1996, the game's UK distributor sold out of Manx TT Super Bike cabinets, despite costing £15,000 or $23,000 (equivalent to $47,000 in 2025) per deluxe cabinet. In Japan, Game Machine listed Manx TT Super Bike on their 15 February 1996 issue as being the second most-successful dedicated arcade game of the month. In March 1996, it was the second top-grossing dedicated arcade game in Japan (below Namco's Alpine Racer) and the overall top-grossing dedicated arcade game in Australia. In North America, the game was also a hit in arcades.

A reviewer for Next Generation hailed the game as "one of the fastest and most dazzling bike coin-ops in the arcades ... the next evolutionary step in bike racing sims." He said the ability to control the bike without placing one's feet on the ground makes it far more immersive and realistic than any previous cycle racing game, and additionally applauded the effective simulation of speed, high frame rate, "solid" learning curve, persistent and intelligent AI opponents, and the way the bike reacts to being hit or jostled by other racers.

=== Sega Saturn ===
Despite the controversy over Sega entrusting the Saturn conversion to an outside developer, upon its release critics agreed that it was an exemplary conversion of the arcade game. Dean Mortock, for example, admitted in Saturn Power: "... I was certainly sceptical as to the reasoning behind letting another team do the conversion. But, after playing the game inside out, I can honestly say that I believe that this is the finest conversion of Manx TT onto the Saturn possible." The game's smooth control was highly praised, with most critics commenting that all three controller options (standard joypad, analog controller, and steering wheel) work well, with the analog controller allowing the most exceptional precision of the three.

The most common criticism made of the game was that the additional content of the Saturn version was insufficient to give it the longevity expected of a home console game. GameSpot in particular concluded that while the game "is one of the best conversions the Saturn has seen and is also truly fun to play", Saturn owners should pass on it in favor of something with higher value-for-money. A Next Generation critic, however, argued that "what Manx TT is missing in depth is made up for in its ability to deliver a thrilling racing experience with an incredibly smooth frame rate, top-notch rider animation (a detail that doesn't mean much until you've seen it), and some of the best control dynamics ever offered in a racing game". Kraig Kujawa of Electronic Gaming Monthly called it "the perfect racing game to rent", while his co-reviewer Dean Hager argued that though the content is limited, "surprisingly, [it] will keep you busy for a while." Rich Leadbetter of Sega Saturn Magazine judged that "although lastability could have been improved, Manx TT is a tough, enjoyable experience which does a great job of bringing the arcade game to Saturn.". In February 1998, Sega Saturn Magazine ranked Manx TT Super Bike 38th in its list of the 50 best Saturn games.

In the United Kingdom, the Sega Saturn release was the third best-selling game across all formats in April 1997.

== See also ==
- Suzuki TT Superbikes
