= Music (video game) =

1998 video game

- Developer(s): Jester Interactive
- Publisher(s): Codemasters
- Platform(s): PlayStation
- Release: EU: November 1998
- Genre(s): Music sequencer
- Mode(s): Single-player

Music is a 1998 music sequencer video game developed by Jester Interactive and published by Codemasters for the PlayStation. It was initially released only in Europe. A sequel, Music 2000, was released in 1999.

== Gameplay ==
Music is a song creation tool. The main screen has 16 channels, where premade sounds called "riffs" can be layered together. There are different riffs, including basslines, drumbeats, samples, vocals, sound effects, and instruments. There are also tools for music video creation.

== Development ==
Music was developed by Jester Interactive, based in Flintshire, Wales. It was founded by Tim Wright, who left Psygnosis to develop the game. Music had a small development team and nine months of development time which lead to extensive crunch time. After seeing a working demo, Codemasters cancelled their own similar product and published Music instead.

== Reception ==
Reception

Review scores
Publication	Score
Consoles +	92%
Computer and Video Games	4/5
MeriStation	8.2/10
Video Games	85%

Computer and Video Games said that it's easy to use and possible to create very impressive songs but disliked the quality of the vocal samples. Meristation liked the riffs section but wished there was more music genres in the game than just dance. Video Games said that sound quality is good but criticised that you can't include your own samples. Consoles + called it "a very, very interesting product".

Music and Music 2000 have sold combined over a million copies.
