= TT Superbikes Real Road Racing =

2005 video game

- North American cover art
- Developer: Jester Interactive
- Publishers: EU: Jester Interactive; NA: Valcon Games
- Platform: PlayStation 2
- Release: EU: 29 April 2005; NA: 4 August 2005
- Genres: Racing, simulation
- Modes: Single-player, multiplayer

TT Superbikes Real Road Racing (known in North America as Suzuki TT Superbikes Real Road Racing) is a 2005 motorcycle simulation racing video game developed by Jester Interactive exclusively for the PlayStation 2 gaming console. The game was self–published by Jester in Europe, with Valcon Games and Taito handling publishing in North America and Japan, respectively. In North America, the game is licensed under Suzuki, an automobile manufacturer.

The title features over 50 licensed vehicles and is entirely based around the famed Isle of Man TT race, a 60.72 km annual competition held within the Isle of Man. It is the second game based on the race, following the 1995 release of Manx TT Super Bike, though this game was only based on the Manx TT event, which is a small section of the course.

The game was available on the PlayStation 3 via the North American PlayStation Store. Suzuki TT Superbikes has since received two sequels.

== Gameplay ==
There are two game modes within TT Superbikes Real Road Racing: Arcade and Challenge. Arcade is the primary game mode, housing standard races, times trials and "Mad Sunday", an event in which the track is also occupied by civilian drivers, who the player can use to their advantage; successfully maneuvering around this traffic awards a speed boost. Boosts across all Arcade races can be earned by performing wheelies, passing another racer and crossing a checkpoint, among other methods. Most tracks do not feature the entire race, instead breaking up the course into separate events. In Challenge mode, the player is tasked with completing various trials, with successful attempts unlocking races, bikes and further challenges. These can be accomplished at a variety of speed difficulties, ranging from 125cc to 1000cc. There is a two-player option available, allowing for split-screen local multiplayer.

Customization options are available for both the driver and the bike. The player may select the helmet and type of leather the driver wears, while also changing the colour. More options are unlocked upon finishing races in a podium position. Conversely, many options are available for personalizing the motorcycles. The colour, wheel type, wheel colour, exhaust and bike itself may all be changed, with additional options being unlocked via completion of Challenge mode trials. Further bike setup options may be adjusted too, such as the pressure of the tires and fuel load. Changing these alters the performance of the bike, which allows the players to customize their vehicle to fit their play style.

== Development ==
TT Superbikes Real Road Racing was first teased on 29 August 2002 at the European Computer Trade Show. At the event, Jester announced its intentions to create a game based on the Isle of Man race. The game itself was only in the planning stages, but Jester confirmed they were working on incorporating a split screen option, multiple bike types and changing weather patterns in an attempt to reflect the real course. Jester also said they intended to include the entire 37.73 mile course and its features of mountain, country and city terrain, the first time a video game would do this (the previous Isle of Man game, Manx TT Super Bike, was only based on the Manx TT part of the race). The game's platform was not specified but it was promised to be a multi-system release.

The game was formally announced on 3 November 2003, under the name Isle of Man TT Superbikes, and was originally scheduled for a first quarter 2004 release within Europe. Initial features accompanying the announcement included details on the Mad Sunday and multiplayer modes. A few months later, on February 20, the game was delayed, with a new expected release date of June 2004. Additional gameplay features were announced alongside the delay, including the promise of up to ten racers at once and a frame rate of 60 frames per second, as well as gameplay options for the tutorial and split-screen. Intentions to heavily advertise the game on Men & Motors, a men's television channel in Britain, were also publicized.

The Isle of Man government assisted in the development of the game, providing the team with data about the course. The developers also traveled to the Isle of Man to capture data themselves, in an attempt to authentically recreate the island.

After three years of development, the game was eventually released in Europe on 29 April 2005 as TT Superbikes Real Road Racing, with a North American version adding Suzuki being released a few months later. The game launched the following year in Japan with an MSRP of ¥5800. The game was re-released on the North American PlayStation Store for $9.99 in September 2012, though it was only playable on the PlayStation 3.

== Reception ==
Reception

Aggregate score
Aggregator	Score
Metacritic	71/100

Review scores
Publication	Score
GameSpot	6.9/10
GamesRadar+	4/5
IGN	6.1/10
PlayStation: The Official Magazine	7.5/10

TT Superbikes Real Road Racing received mixed to positive reception upon release. The game holds a score of 71 on Metacritic based on reviews from seven critics. Critics typically praised the physics and realism, but were concerned with the long loading times and lack of track variety.

Reviewing for IGN, Ed Lewis scored the game a 6.1/10. Lewis praised the in game physics and AI of the opponent, and ultimately called the game itself a "decent racing game", but faulted the game for not being original enough. He also criticized a lack of content, recommending more tracks and saying that the game needed more "personality". Lewis recommended players wait for the then-upcoming MotoGP 4, a similar motorcycle racing game that was to release a few months later.

Gord Goble of GameSpot praised the physics, sense of speed, sounds and realism, although criticized the "claustrophobic" two lane raceway and presence of only one track, though he would partially justify this by pointing out the longevity of the course. He would go on to award the game a score of 6.9/10, equating to "fair".

PlayStation Magazine gave the game a 7.5/10. In their review, the publication praised the physics but called the graphics average and load times "excruciatingly long".

GamesRadar's short review positively compared the levels of realism to Sony's Gran Turismo series, but bashed the title for not being accessible to players not accustomed to motorbike racing games. Despite negative opinions, they highly recommended the game to players familiar with the genre, saying "TT certainly isn't for everyone...but biking aficionados will go wild with joy that they finally have a racer worthy of their beloved sport". They gave the game a score of four stars out of five.

== Legacy ==
TT Superbikes Real Road Racing has received two sequels, with both of them also being exclusive to the PlayStation 2. TT Superbikes Real Road Racing Championship was the first, coming out on 7 March 2008 in Europe. A North American version again adding the "Suzuki" brand was released the following year on 5 March. This game was also released on the PlayStation Store, being published on 4 September 2012. This was again exclusive to the North American Store, and was only playable on the PlayStation 3.

The third and final game in the series, titled TT Superbikes Legends, was released a few months after Championship, coming out in Europe on 28 November 2008. Unlike the other two games, this version was not released for other regions.
