= PDC World Championship Darts Pro Tour =

2010 video game

PDC World Championship Darts: Pro Tour
- Xbox 360 cover art, featuring (from left to right): Simon Whitlock, Raymond Van Barneveld, Phil Taylor, James Wade and Gary Anderson.
- Developers: Redoubt; Rebellion Developments
- Publisher: O-Games
- Platforms: PlayStation 3, Wii, Xbox 360
- Release: EU: 26 November 2010
- Genres: Sports, simulation
- Modes: Single-player, multiplayer

PDC World Championship Darts: Pro Tour is a darts simulation video game based on events held by the Professional Darts Corporation (PDC). It was developed by Rebellion Developments in collaboration with British developer Redoubt, Ltd. and published by O-Games on 26 November 2010 in Europe for PlayStation 3, Wii and Xbox 360.

O-Games introduced downloadable content that was (and still is) available on the PS3 and Xbox 360 (some of which is exclusive to the PS3) for the game, which offered two extra players and a new tournament. The only pack was released on the games release which included dart players Wayne Mardle and Peter Manley and the Las Vegas Desert Classic tournament.

Upon release, the game was met with a mixed-to-positive reception.

== Gameplay ==
As well as full compatibility with the standard DualShock 3 controller, the PS3 version integrates full PlayStation Move compatibility, however, the Xbox 360 version does not incorporate additional Kinect functionality.

The game includes commentary from Sid Waddell and John Gwynne, top-level match referees Bruce Spendley and Russ Bray, and master of ceremonies John McDonald.

=== Featured professionals ===
- (England) Phil Taylor
- (Netherlands) Raymond van Barneveld
- (England) James Wade
- (England) Mervyn King
- (England) Terry Jenkins
- (England) Ronnie Baxter
- (England) Adrian Lewis
- (England) Colin Lloyd
- (England) Andy Hamilton
- (England) Colin Osborne
- (England) Dennis Priestley
- (Scotland) Robert Thornton
- (Australia) Simon Whitlock
- (England) Kevin Painter
- (Scotland) Gary Anderson
- (Netherlands) Jelle Klaasen
- (England) Wayne Mardle (downloadable pack)
- (England) Peter Manley (downloadable pack)

=== PDC tournaments ===
Six PDC tournaments are included in the game, with an extra tournament as downloadable content.

- UK Open
- World Matchplay
- European Championship
- World Grand Prix
- Grand Slam of Darts
- PDC World Darts Championship
- Las Vegas Desert Classic (Note: Wayne Mardle, Peter Manley and the Las Vegas Desert Classic must be downloaded in order to play them.)

== Reception ==
Reception

Aggregate score
Aggregator	Score		
Aggregator	PS3	Wii	Xbox 360
GameRankings	57%		40%

Review scores
Publication	Score		
Publication	PS3	Wii	Xbox 360
GameSpot		7.5/10	
Push Square	6/10		
