= Shadow of the Beast (2016 video game) =

Platform game

- Developers: Heavy Spectrum Entertainment Labs; XDev
- Publisher: Sony Interactive Entertainment
- Composer: Ian Livingstone
- Series: Shadow of the Beast
- Engine: Unreal Engine 4
- Platform: PlayStation 4
- Release: 17 May 2016
- Genres: Platform, action-adventure, hack and slash
- Mode: Single-player

Shadow of the Beast is a 2016 platform video game developed by British studio Heavy Spectrum Entertainment Labs and published by Sony Interactive Entertainment for the PlayStation 4. It is a remake and re-imagining of Psygnosis and Reflections' 1989 game of the same name.

== Gameplay ==
Gameplay of Shadow of the Beast combines platform and action elements, with the introduction of combos. Players have to defeat enemies. This can be achieved by counter-attacking to strike them down; shield-wielding foes must be ducked behind in order to defeat them. It features a traditional health bar, combos through quick time events, traps, and puzzles. The game features the parallax scrolling from the original title, using some 3D elements.

The original Shadow of the Beast is included in the remake as an unlockable extra. An "infinite lives" mode was added to make the original game easier to play.

== Plot ==
The game follows the story of its original predecessor. Players control Aarbron, a seventh born to a seventh child, who was born so strong that Maletoth, a reaper of spirits, saw in him the potential to hold a great power. Maletoth kidnaps Aarbron. While Aarbron's mother leads the search of her son, perishing in the process, Maletoth brings Aarbron to the Gate of Souls, where he ordered the Council of Mages to corrupt Aarbron through magic. Aarbron becomes a monstrous warrior-servant manipulated by Maletoth for his quest to conquer the world.

Later, Maletoth learns of another strong child, so he commissions the mage Zelek to kidnap this child by using Aarbron. In the meanwhile, Aarbron's father had turned to the Seekers, a group of people dedicated to stopping Maletoth. The Seekers discover Maletoth's plan to kidnap this second child to replace Aarbron. The Seekers find the child before Zelek in the attempt of keeping her safe from Maletoth. However, Zelek learns of this plan and uses Aarbron to slaughter everyone involved in protecting the child, including Aarbron's father.

Killing his father awakens Aarbron. He pursues Zelek, who had found refuge in the lands of the Dryads and given the child to the Queen of the land. The Queen sends the child to Maletoth, while unsuccessfully trying to kill Aarbron. The child is delivered to Maletoth, while Aarbron learns of Maletoth' machinations from a dying Zelek.

Aarbron goes to Hydrath's castle to defeat Hidrath and enter the portal the leads to Maletoth. The Sentinel, another of Maletoth's creation that seek revenge, sees in Aarbron the power to finally take on Maletoth and helps him in this endeavor. The Sentinel brings Aarbron to the Graveyard of the Fallen so that he could channel the soul trapped there and gain power. Empowered by these souls, Aarbron defeats Maletoth, taking his power for his own.

== Development ==
Shadow of the Beast was announced by Sony Interactive Entertainment for the PlayStation 4 during Gamescom. The first trailer was revealed, together with the announcement of Heavy Spectrum Entertainment Labs being the developer of the game. The first gameplay footage during E3 2015. The game was released on 17 May 2016.

The game uses the Unreal Engine 4 as its underlying engine technology, and Audiokinetic Wwise for audio.

== Reception ==
Reception

Aggregate score
Aggregator	Score
Metacritic	64/100

Review scores
Publication	Score
Edge	5/10
Famitsu	30/40
GameRevolution	3/10
GameSpot	5/10
Hardcore Gamer	3.5/5
IGN	7.6/10
PlayStation Official Magazine – UK	5/10
Polygon	3/10
Push Square	7/10
Retro Gamer	5/10
USgamer	4/5
Digital Spy	3/5
Slant Magazine	4/5

Shadow of the Beast received "mixed" reviews according to the review aggregation website Metacritic. IGN said: "Bloody, elegant combat and an otherworldly vibe make Shadow of the Beast a successful reboot of the Amiga classic." GameSpot, however, said, "For a remake, it's not a good sign that the best part about the modern Shadow of the Beast is revisiting the game that inspired it." In Japan, where the game was ported for release on May 19, 2016, Famitsu gave it a score of one eight, two sevens, and one eight for a total of 30 out of 40.

Writing for Metro, David Jenkins gave the game eight out of ten and described it as taking the inspiration from the art and concept of the somewhat flawed original and marrying this with influences from modern action games, such as Castlevania: Lords of Shadow and Heavenly Sword, to create something greater than its own legacy. Jed Pressgrove of Slant Magazine gave it four stars out of five, saying that the game "surpasses its predecessor by articulating a horrific but heroic myth underneath the clothes of a traditional platformer and beat-'em-up." However, Sam Loveridge of Digital Spy gave it three stars out of five, saying, "Shadow of the Beast might not be exactly what true fans were expecting, especially with a few strange gameplay and narrative choices, but there's still something here for everyone. It's short, but it's only £11.99 and there's plenty of replayability here - not to mention it's two games for the price of one."
