= Super Trucks =

2002 video game

- Developer(s): Jester Interactive
- Publisher(s): EU: Jester Interactive; NA: XS Games
- Designer(s): Andy Cowe
- Platform(s): PlayStation 2
- Release: EU: 28 June 2002; NA: 29 October 2003
- Genre(s): Racing
- Mode(s): Single-player, multiplayer

Super Trucks (known in North America as Super Trucks Racing) is a racing video game developed and published by Jester Interactive exclusively for PlayStation 2. All drivers and sponsor information are based on the 2001 season of the Super Trucks racing series.

According to the European box art, the game compares itself to TOCA on steroids, but the North American box art is considered to be a simplified version of the box art seen in Europe. All visual effects and reviews are absent in the North American release and the ESRB rating is shown instead of the ELSPA rating. The theme song used at the opening title is "Bug" and is sung in a heavy metal-style by the band Feeder. Most of the other songs in the game are considered to be techno music done to the tune of the souped up engines at more than 122.0 miles per hour (196.3 km/h). This makes the trucks slightly faster than their real-life counterparts who are restricted to a maximum speed limit of 100.0 miles per hour (160.9 km/h) for safety reasons.

== Gameplay ==
While the player's truck has unlimited gasoline, the player must maintain the temperature of the truck's brakes by cooling them with water. An option in the menu can be toggled so this task can either be done manually or automatically by the game. Since there is a limited amount of water available to cool the brakes, even automatic brake cooling does not guarantee that the brakes will remain cool in longer races or practice sessions.

These specialized trucks are eighteen wheelers that are modified for racing on road courses; a large majority of these courses are located in Europe (including the Circuit Paul Armagnac in Nogaro, France). Formula One-like physics and turning dominate the tracks. Darlington Raceway (referred to in-game as "Darlington Autodrome" for no apparent reason) is considered to be one of the few North American courses in the game, but it uses right as well as left turns like a road course instead of the standard oval used for NASCAR racing. All the real-world drivers included in the game are European in origin. Although the pit lane can be seen while driving through the start/finish line, the entrance to the pit lane is blocked and pit stops are not permitted in any mode of the game.

All manufacturers which competed in the 2001 European Truck Racing Championship are represented, apart from Mercedes-Benz, whose drivers appear in the game as part of an unlicensed "Moto LKW" racing team. This is due to Mercedes-Benz's then-ongoing relationship with game developer Synetic GmbH, who produced Mercedes-Benz Truck Racing in 2000, and would later produce Mercedes-Benz World Racing in 2003.

== Gameplay modes ==
| Mode name | Description |
|---|---|
| Championship | The player guides a chosen driver to progressively harder championships. Five major championships with different rules are used. Harder championships are unlocked with championship victories in the easier tournaments. |
| Single Race | This mode consists of racing against either a friend or the computer for bragging rights on a course. Tracks for racing in the single race mode must be unlocked by winning its respective race on the championship mode. Otherwise, the player is stuck with three race tracks. |
| Arcade Mode | The arcade mode comes with special arcade timing similar to old-school racing games like Pole Position. |
| Time Trial Mode | Time in this mode is recorded for up to 100 hours (roughly equivalent to 4.2 days) and an unlimited number of laps. |
| Last Man Standing | Ten drivers must race against each other until there is only one driver remaining, but this must be unlocked before the option can be selected. |

== Reception ==
Reception

Aggregate score
| Aggregator | Score |
|---|---|
| Metacritic | 66/100 |

Review scores
| Publication | Score |
|---|---|
| Consoles + | 75% |
| Edge | 3/10 |
| Famitsu | 25/40 |
| Game Informer | 6.75/10 |
| GamesMaster | 56% |
| GameSpot | 7.1/10 |
| GameZone | 7.8/10 |
| IGN | 6.4/10 |
| Jeuxvideo.com | 14/20 |
| Official U.S. PlayStation Magazine | 1.5/5 stars |

The game received "average" reviews according to the review aggregation website Metacritic. In Japan, where the game was ported and published by Success on 18 December 2003, Famitsu gave it a score of three sixes and one seven for a total of 25 out of 40.
