= Ski-Doo: Snowmobile Challenge =

2009 video game

- NTSC region cover art
- Developer: ColdWood Interactive
- Publisher: Valcon Games
- Platforms: PlayStation 3, Wii, Xbox 360
- Release: Wii: NA: October 13, 2009; PS3: NA: March 10, 2009; Xbox 360: NA: March 24, 2010
- Genre: Sports
- Modes: Single-player; Multiplayer

Ski-Doo: Snowmobile Challenge is a snowmobiling video game developed by Swedish studio ColdWood Interactive and published by Valcon Games for PlayStation 3, Xbox 360, and Wii.

== Reception ==
The game received moderate reviews. It got 6.4 out of 10 from IGN and 4.5 out of 10 from Official Xbox Magazine.
