= Jester Interactive =

Welsh video game development company

- Industry: Video games
- Founded: 1997; 29 years ago
- Headquarters: Flintshire, Wales
- Website: www.jesterinteractive.com

Jester Interactive is a video game developer based in Flintshire, Wales in the United Kingdom. It was founded in 1997 as a trading arm of Morgan Computing Limited. It would later trade under the name Jester Interactive Limited, and after going into administration in 2003, it would re-emerge as Jester Interactive Publishing Limited.

== History ==
Jester Interactive Limited was formed as part of a Database Software company based in North Wales, through funding from Morgan Computing Limited. The key staff who initiated this venture were Lee Wright, Tim Wright and Gavin Morgan, managing director of Morgan Computing Limited.

Jester Interactive initially consisted of a small team of five people working in offices based at Liverpool's Port of Liverpool Building where they began development on the company's first title NoiseToys. NoiseToys was later renamed as Music Station, then shortened to Music with the strapline Music Creation for the PlayStation Generation. This line of software also featured a DJ character known as 'Scratchy' which usually appeared on all Jester's Music products.

After about 9 months, Jester launched its first title, Music, through Codemasters to critical acclaim. As the winners of the Official PlayStation Magazine award for the Most Innovative Game 1999 and Sony Computer Entertainment America's award for Most Innovative Game 2000, Jester also twice reached final nomination for the highly acclaimed BAFTA awards in the category of the user interface. Jester went on to develop several racing games involving Super Trucks and the Isle of Man TT races.

In 2000, Jester won the Achievement Wales 2000 Business of the Year Award from the Daily Post / Wales 2000 initiative.

In 2001, it was ranked No. 4 in the Fast Growth 50 company list.

Jester's most recent titles include TT Superbikes Real Road Racing and TT Superbikes Legends. As of 2008, they were working on new titles in multiple of their key franchises, including the Music Generator series.

== Games developed ==
| Year | Game | Platform(s) |
|---|---|---|
| 1998 | Music | PlayStation |
| 1999 | Music 2000 / MTV Music Generator | PlayStation, Microsoft Windows |
| 2001 | MTV Music Generator 2 | PlayStation 2 |
| 2002 | Pocket Music | Game Boy Color, Game Boy Advance |
| 2002 | Super Trucks | PlayStation 2 |
| 2002 | Manic Miner | Game Boy Advance |
| 2003 | Music 3000 | PlayStation 2 |
| 2005 | TT Superbikes Real Road Racing | PlayStation 2 |
| 2005 | Dance:UK XL Lite | PlayStation 2 |
| 2008 | TT Superbikes Real Road Racing Championship | PlayStation 2 |
| 2008 | TT Superbikes Legends | PlayStation 2 |
