= Table Top Racing =

2013 video game

- Developer: Playrise Digital
- Publisher: Playrise Digital
- Platforms: Microsoft Windows, iOS, Android, PlayStation 4, PlayStation Vita, Xbox One
- Release: iOS; January 31, 2013; Android; January 23, 2014; PlayStation Vita; August 5, 2014; PlayStation 4, Xbox One; May 3, 2016; Microsoft Windows; May 26, 2016
- Genre: Racing
- Modes: Single-player, multiplayer

Table Top Racing is racing video game developed and published by British studio Playrise Digital. The game was originally developed for iOS on January 31, 2013, and later released for Android devices on January 23, 2014. A PlayStation Vita version was released on August 5, 2014.

== Gameplay ==
Gameplay in Table Top Racing showing the control scheme and HUD

Table Top Racing uses settings and environments similar to the Micro Machines series, with its basic gameplay similar to the Mario Kart series. Much like Micro Machines, the player controls a miniature toy car, with tracks comprising various elements of a larger structure, such as a kitchen table, a garage workbench, a Japanese restaurant, and a picnic table. Much like Mario Kart, cars have simple, arcade-like controls.

The player has two options as to how to control the cars; "Tilt" features accelerometer steering (tilting the physical device to the left to turn left and to the right to turn right) and "Simple" features touch to steer (where the play touches the left side of the touchscreen to turn left, and the right side to turn right). Both modes use auto-accelerate and auto-brake. Within most races, the player can collect items which can then be used during the race, such as "speed boosts" or "projectile attacks".

Generally, the goal of each race is to compete against multiple other cars, with the aim of finishing first. However, there are also several other modes of play; such as catching up to another car who is given a head start, elimination-style races where the last car at the end of each lap is eliminated, time trials, and drifting. The start of the race can be crucial in short races. Pressing the throttle at the correct time during the countdown (on the beep of the 1) can get you a boost start. At the end of each race, the player is given a zero to three star rating based on how well they performed, with better scores awarded with higher amounts of in-game currency, which can subsequently be used to upgrade and customize the player's vehicle, or buy new vehicles. The game also features in-app purchases, allowing the player to use real money to purchase in-game currency.Switch]].

== Development ==
The game's development staff consisted of members who had previously worked on and co-created the Wipeout series.

The game was originally for the iOS platform on January 31, 2013, and almost a year later released on Android devices on January 23, 2014. At Gamescom 2013, it was announced that a version for the PlayStation Vita is in development and will be released sometime in 2014 as well.

== Table Top Racing: World Tour ==
Table Top Racing: World Tour
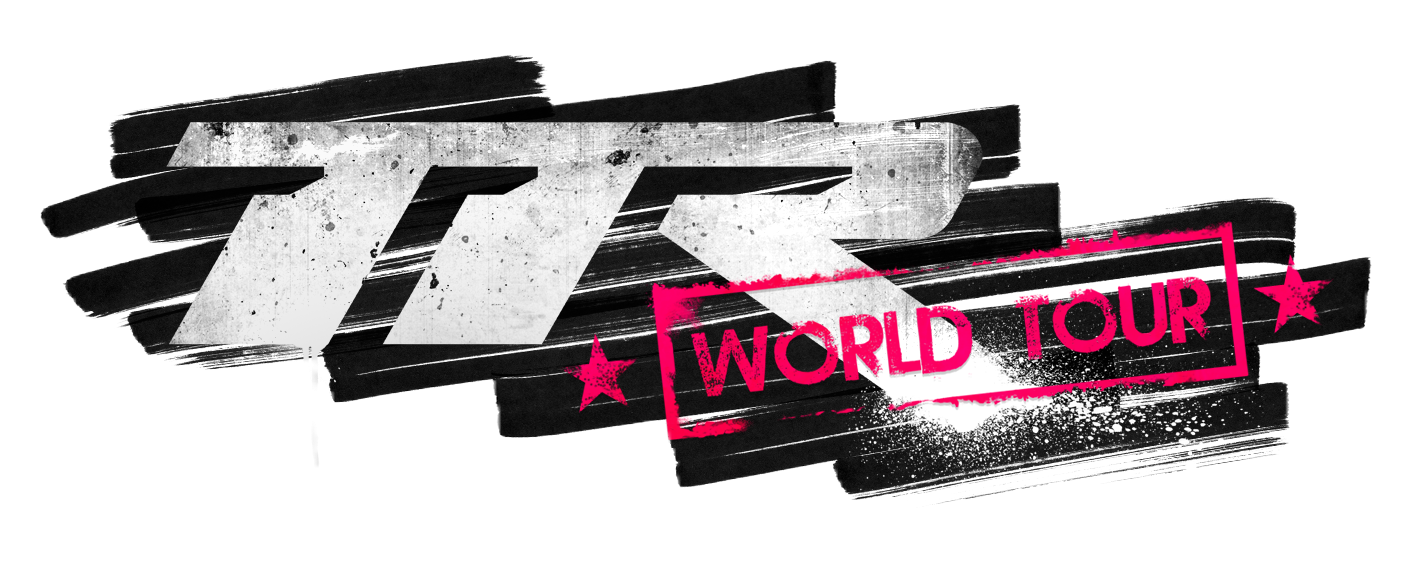
- Developer: Playrise Digital
- Publisher: Playrise Digital
- Platforms: Android, iOS, PlayStation 4, Xbox One, Microsoft Windows
- Release: May 2016
- Genre: Racing
- Modes: Single-Player, online muitiplayer

A second game in the series, Table Top Racing: World Tour was released in May 2016 for PC, PlayStation 4, Xbox One and mobile platforms.

== Reception ==
Reception

Aggregate scores
Aggregator	Score
GameRankings	70.62%
Metacritic	72/100

Review scores
Publication	Score
Computer and Video Games	6/10
AppSpy	5/5
Gamezebo	3.5/5
MacLife	2/5
Modojo	4/5
Pocket Gamer	7/10
Slide to Play	4/4
The Sunday Times	4/5
TouchArcade	3.5/5
AndroidShock	3.5/5

The game was generally well-received, with a score of 72 out of 100 on Metacritic, based on seventeen reviews, and 70.62% on GameRankings, based on thirteen reviews.

Slide to Play's Jason D'Aprile praised the game, calling it "one of the most polished and entertaining arcade racers in the App Store. With its great variety and mix of single and multiplayer game modes, it's an incredibly well-rounded release that's recommendable for casual and hardcore driving fans." AppSpy's Andrew Nesvadba also praised the presentation and graphics, stating "where Table Top lacks in conceptual innovation, it makes up for in the sheer level of polishing that has gone in to the execution. Handling for each vehicle is silky smooth; the stage designs pop out at you and load up almost instantly; and upgrading never feels like a chore." Touchgen's Merijn De Boer scored the game 4 out of 5, stating "Table Top Racing presents some of the juiciest steaks I have ever seen in video games, a finger lickin' good distraction. Bad table manners are advised." Chris Buffa of Modojo felt the game had "imaginative tracks," and argued that "Playrise did a wonderful job bringing familiar locations to life, such as a children's toy room, an instrument-covered workbench and BBQ." Also reviewing the game for GameTrailers, Buffa stated "We have to hand it to the developers, who dreamed up some intriguing locations [...] It's a welcome change from the real world courses that usually make up simulation-heavy racing games."

Pocket Gamer's Harry Slater gave the game a "Bronze Award", stating, it "isn't perfect, and some might find that it lacks a little depth, but this is a polished and instantly playable arcade racer with enough tracks and challenges to keep anyone with even a passing interest in vrooming little cars around a table entertained for a while." Gamezebo's Joe Jasko praised the game's "fun household environments. Beautiful graphics. Tons of replay value over multiple game modes." However, he was unimpressed with the controls, which he felt were somewhat awkward, arguing that the sensors on the touchscreen for item activation and steering are too close together. Campbell Bird of 148Apps argued that "Table Top Racing is a high quality package that delivers a satisfying and varied combat racing experience." TouchArcade's Eric Ford argued that "Table Top's environments and overall visual flair are pretty top notch. Unfortunately, a relatively generic gameplay outing and its emphasis on auto-acceleration controls keep the game from reaching loftier heights." On the other hand, Pocket Lint's Mike Lowe argued "The game's controls are wonderfully simple. There's no accelerator, instead your vehicle just goes and goes all by itself, much like a wind-up toy. All you need to do is tap the left or right turn buttons to the corresponding side of the screen, which means eyes can be fixed on to the action without fingers getting all in the way. None of this tilt-to-turn faff, although that is also an option within the menus if it's your personal preference."

Some critics were less impressed by the game. Kotaku's Evan Narcisse was far more negative, stating that "the gameplay doesn't feel like racing. It feels more like a bunch of clowns stumbling all over each other. Table Top Racing is a clumsy but good-looking effort at trying to recreate the appeal of Mario Kart on an iDevice." MacLife's Matt Clark was also critical, scoring the game 2 out of 5, referring to it as "mundane" and "vanilla", and criticizing it for lack of originality, and a difficulty in finding players for online play. Andy Hartup of Computer and Video Games praised the multiplayer gameplay, but criticized the game's lack customization and weaponry options. A common complaint amongst reviewers was that the game didn't feel as fast as it should.

The game received a positive reception in mainstream press; The Sunday Times scored it 4 out of 5. Table Top Racing also featured in The Guardian's "App Blog" as one of the best Apps of the Week.

=== Awards ===
The game has received multiple awards. It was awarded "iOS or Android Game of the Week" by Pocket Gamer, "App of the Day" by Pocket Lint, "Game of the Month" by Slide To Play, and "Game of the Month" by What Mobile. It was nominated for "Best Game" at the 2013 TIGA Awards, and for "Best Use Of Gaming" at the 2013 Big Chip Awards. Playrise Digital was nominated for Best Publisher at the 2013 Mobile Entertainment Awards, and The Appsters Awards, and won the "Best Startup" category at the 2013 TIGA Awards. It also featured in AndroidShock's "Best of January 2014" as one of the best games of the month.
