= PDC World Championship Darts 2008 =

2008 video game

- PlayStation 2 box art
- Developer(s): Mere Mortals
- Publisher(s): EU: Oxygen Games; AU: Red Ant Enterprises
- Platform(s): PlayStation 2, PC, PlayStation Portable, Wii, Xbox 360
- Release: PlayStation 2: EU: 25 January 2008; AU: 21 February 2008; NA: 16 June 2009; Windows: PAL: 25 January 2008; Wii: PAL: 8 February 2008; NA: 16 June 2009; PlayStation Portable: PAL: 13 June 2008; NA: 16 June 2009; Xbox 360: PAL: 26 Sep 2008
- Genre(s): Sports
- Mode(s): Single-player, multiplayer

PDC World Championship Darts 2008 is a sports video game, published by Oxygen Interactive and developed and designed by Mere Mortals. It was released for the PlayStation 2, PlayStation 3 PC, Wii, Xbox 360, and the PlayStation Portable. The game features sixteen professionals from the Professional Darts Corporation, and seven tournaments from the PDC circuit. It is a direct sequel to the previous year's PDC World Championship Darts.

The game was localized for and released in North America on June 16, 2009, on the Wii, PlayStation 2 and PlayStation Portable with the year 2008 dropped from its title. A Nintendo DS version was planned, but cancelled, although the DS version of the Nintendo-exclusive sequel, PDC World Championship Darts 2009, was released as a port of the abovementioned North American localization at the same time it was released.

== Gameplay ==
Much like its predecessor, the game attempts to recreate playing real darts through the functions of the controller and rules set within the game. A variety of new and returning modes are also available for play.

=== Rules ===
See also Playing darts and Scoring for full rules

The game almost exactly follows the rules of the classic 501 darts game. Two professionals (one or two controlled by the player) throw darts onto the dartboard to decrease their score to 0, but they must end with a double. The only exception is the World Grand Prix where players must also start with a double. The dartboard's numbers are positioned just as they are in real darts.

Each player throws three darts before the next player's turn. In standard rules, whoever reaches 0 first has won the leg. Varying amounts of legs comprise sets, a certain amount of which must be gained to win the match. An alternative format is matchplay, where certain amounts of legs must be gained to win the match.

=== Controls ===
Throwing darts is implemented as a three-step procedure across all platforms. The first step is for the player to decide the general area of where they want to throw, determined using a set of keyboard keys, the Wii Remote pointer or an analog stick, depending on platform and control option. The second step is to determine how strongly the dart is to be thrown towards the chosen aiming area. The throwing power oscillates automatically on the Wii version as long as a "lock-on" button is held, while other platforms determine it manually based on how far the other analog stick is pulled or how long a key is held down. In 'Amateur' mode the power can be seen with a blue that fills a power meter; in 'Professional' mode this aid is not present and the power can be seen via the movement of the character's arm. A new difficulty added is 'Master' mode where extra precision is required.

Once the desired amount of power is reached, the player then completes the throwing procedure in a third and final step by actually making the throwing motion. The Wii version implements this with an actual thrusting motion of the Wii Remote and the PC version assigns this move to another key to press. Other platforms implement the throwing action by quickly flicking the right analog stick forward just after it was pulled backward. Any deviation to the left or right while throwing the dart will also affect the dart's flight. The game also takes into account real-life darts physics, such as under- or over-stacking of darts, flights falling out, and bounce-outs. The former can be used to tactical advantage. These were not present in the first game.

The Wii version also utilizes an alternate control scheme that uses the Nunchuk's analog stick to adjust power and throw the dart, like most other platforms.

=== Modes ===
There are numerous modes of play within the game. Aside from a simple Exhibition between one or two players, a single player can also create a custom character and begin a career to become the world's best dart player. Another mode allows any of the tournaments in career mode to be played individually. Or, the player can create a custom tournament with their own preferred format and play that individually or with others. Party Games mode is also available, allowing players to play games such as Around The Clock and Killer in an environment without a crowd.

== Professionals ==
Sixteen professionals were included in the game. This was six more than in the previous game, with them joining the original ten. The in-game players are below (listed along with their main career achievements):

A screenshot featuring Andy Hamilton throwing against Ronnie Baxter

- Phil Taylor – 'The Power' – Sixteen-time World Champion and the greatest darts player of all time
- Raymond van Barneveld – 'The Man / Barney' – Five-time World Champion, including 2007, the year the game coincided with. The greatest darts player in the Netherlands
- John Part – 'Darth Maple' – Three-time World Champion (1994, 2003, 2008) and Canada's greatest darts player
- Dennis Priestley – 'The Menace' – Two-time World Champion (1991, 1994)
- Colin Lloyd – 'Jaws' – World Matchplay champion (2005) and World Grand Prix (2004) champion
- Peter Manley – 'One Dart' – Las Vegas Desert Classic champion (2003) and three-time World Championship finalist (1999, 2002, 2006)
- Alan Warriner-Little – 'The Iceman' – BDO World Championship finalist (1993) World Grand Prix champion (2001)
- Mark Dudbridge – 'Flash' – World Matchplay runner up (2004) and World Championship finalist (2005)
- Wayne Mardle – 'Hawaii 501' – World Championship semi-finalist (2004, 2005, 2006)
- Adrian Lewis – 'Jackpot' – Two time back to back World Champion (2011 and 2012) and Taylor's protégé
- Roland Scholten – 'The Flying Dutchman / Tripod' – UK Open champion (2004)
- Terry Jenkins – 'The Bull' – Five-time runner-up in various televised competitions over 2006 and 2007
- Kevin Painter – 'The Artist' – World Championship runner-up (2004) and two-time semi-finalist (2003, 2008)
- Ronnie Baxter – 'The Rocket' – Two-time BDO World Championship runner-up (1999, 2000), World Matchplay and Desert Classic runner-up
- Andy Hamilton – 'The Hammer' – Grand Slam of Darts runner-up (2007)
- Andy Jenkins – 'Rocky' – World Championship semi-finalist (2007)

== Special features ==
PDC Pro animations (throw styles and walk ons) have been motion-captured and are fully integrated. All new graphic enhancements – player improvements and real-world sets and tournament locations, based on the locations from the PDC calendar. Enhanced audio including calling, commentary, convincing dynamic crowd sounds, and darts atmospherics. Enhanced A.I – player A.I. is calculated using real life averages from major tournaments and also based on actual playing characteristics i.e. stamina, belief, pressure, complacency and accuracy. Improved and in-depth career mode, realistically reflecting a player's progress through the PDC calendar, featuring 7 of the major PDC tournaments each season. All new character editor, supplying a greater range of options to customise players' pros. Elements include male and female character models, skin tone, eye colour, nationality, name, hairstyle, hair colour, eyewear, shirt style and colour, throwing angle, level of difficulty and preferred checkout. Also includes options for dart barrel weights and flight designs.
