= Music 2000 =

1999 video game

- European cover art
- Developer: Jester Interactive
- Release: PlayStation: EU: November 26, 1999; NA: December 15, 1999; Windows; May 2000
- Platform: PlayStation, Windows
- Type: Digital audio workstation

Music 2000 (known in North America as MTV Music Generator) is a music sequencer program and music video game developed by Jester Interactive and published by Codemasters for the PlayStation and Windows in 1999. It is a sequel to Music from 1998. A sequel, MTV Music Generator 2, was released in 2001.

== Gameplay ==
The main screen has 24 channels (opposed to previous game's 16), where premade sounds called "riffs" can be layered together. New in the sequel, multiple channels can be combined into one riff. Samples from previous game were kept and more samples were added. The multiplayer mode is turn-based where up to four players manage beats, rhythms, or melodies to form one complete song.

== Reception ==
Reception

Aggregate score
Aggregator	Score
GameRankings	85%

Review scores
Publication	Score
Computer and Video Games	5/5 (PS1)
GamePro	5.0/5 (PS1); 4.0/5 (PC)
GameSpot	7.0/10 (PS1)
IGN	9.0/10 (PS1)
Jeuxvideo.com	16/20 (PS1)
MeriStation	9.2/10 (PC)

GameSpot reviewed the PS1 version: "If you're a serious musician and tool around on your PC, you're probably going to be frustrated or bored, as the RAM is obviously limited and the library is nothing you haven't seen or used before." IGN said: "The video library is massive, and the utilitarian feel and ease of composition is nearly flawless. For the most part the sound effects and beats are great to use and easy to paste into the music score, or to alter." GamePro called the PS1 version "amazing" and the PC version "a must-have for music fans everywhere"

Vice wrote in a 2015 retrospective: "As a 'game' it was torturous; fiddly, unresponsive, demanding and difficult. As a tool it was invaluable."

Music and Music 2000 have sold combined over a million copies.

== Legacy ==
Artists including Skepta, Jme, Dizzee Rascal, Hudson Mohawke, Bob Vylan, Kode9, and Terror Danjah produced music on Music 2000 prior to their music careers.
