= Gametrak =

Brand of 3-dimensional game control systems

Gametrak is a brand of 3-dimensional game control systems based on position tracking, designed for home video game platforms such as video game consoles and personal computers. The first Gametrak was invented in 2000 by Elliott Myers, who developed and guided the Gamester video game peripheral range for Leda Media Products and later Radica Games. Myers founded gaming company In2Games around Gametrak in November 2000.

The main hardware for the original Gametrak is the base unit, a weighted device positioned on the floor in front of the display. The base unit communicates with the console or PC by Universal Serial Bus. and also features an attached foot-pedal input.

== Technology ==
The Gametrak uses a patented mechanical system for tracking position of physical elements in three-dimensional space in real time. The base unit features two identical mechanisms, each of which can determine the three-dimensional coordinates of an associated element relative to the mechanism. Each mechanism contains a retracting cable reel and a small tubular guide arm from which the cable passes out. The guide arm is articulated in a ball joint such that the arm and ball follow the angle at which the cable extends from the mechanism. At the end of the cable is a fastener for connecting to the tracked element.

The distance of the tracked element from the mechanism is determined through components which measure the rotation of the spool drum for the retracting cable reel, and calculating how far the cable is extended. Through the ball joint and guide arm, the mechanism functions in a similar fashion as a gamepad analog stick to determine the angular direction from the mechanism to the track element. From the distance and angle data, a three-dimensional position for the element is resolved. The predetermined spacing and orientation of the mechanisms on the base unit allows the coordinate data gathered by the two mechanisms to be converted into positions in a unified space. According to In2Games, the mechanisms can determine position "to an accuracy of 1 millimetre anywhere within a 3m cube around the unit, with no processor overhead or time delay."

By tracking two positions, it is possible to independently track two different objects, or the position and orientation of a single object, such as a sword or baseball bat. The Gametrak includes special fingerless gloves, each with a fastener along the outside edge for attaching a tether cable, allowing the system to track both of a user's hands.

Haptic functionality was planned to be incorporated into future revisions of the original Gametrak, in which supplementary retraction forces on the tension cables would be dynamically increased or decreased to simulate various effects.

== History ==
According to Myers, he arrived at the basic concept for the Gametrak while playing with a retractable washing line in a hotel bathroom. While pulling the cord out, Myers thought of combining it with a joystick mechanism to create a 3D control device. After testing the concept, the developers worked on an implementation to make the device affordable, accurate, and reliable enough for a mass market. Myers stated that "the whole process took about 3 years to get right."

In January 2003, Atomic Planet Entertainment was confirmed as a licensed developer for the Gametrak, developing the launch title for the peripheral, a first-person fighting game originally entitled Dark Wind. In the game, players move their hands to punch, block, dodge and wield magic against the on-screen opponent.

In August 2004, a few months before launch, the Gametrak was showcased at the 2004 Games Convention, where it won a "Best of GC" award for "Most Innovative Product". Along with the renamed Dark Wind, at the convention In2Games publicly debuted Real World Golf, a golf simulator game being developed by Aqua Pacific with design consultant Jon Hare, and set for release in 2005.

Gametrak was released for PlayStation 2 on October 22, 2004 in Europe, bundled with Dark Wind. The game received mixed reviews but went on to sell around 60,000 copies. On August 26, 2005, In2Games simultaneously released PlayStation 2 versions of Real World Golf and Gametrak Version 2 in Europe. Gametrak Version 2 is functionally identical to the previous version, but features various design refinements.

Real World Golf debuted at #19 in the weekly Chart-Track rankings for PlayStation 2 software titles in the United Kingdom, after only two days of sales; rising to #6 the next week; and peaking at #3 the following week. Remaining in the top 20 for another 6 weeks, the game was considered a major success by the company. In November 2005 In2Games announced that it had secured additional funding and support, and was planning to expand Gametrak to new regions and platforms. The company also revealed plans for more Gametrak games; including self-published bowling, basketball, first-person shooter, and party game titles; and a baseball game called Slugger! from Gametrak's distributor Mad Catz. Slugger was advertised on Real World Golfs Xbox packaging.

PC versions of the Gametrak and Real World Golf were released in Europe on November 23, 2005. On April 11, 2006, Gametrak was released for both PlayStation 2 and Xbox in the United States, bundled with enhanced versions of Real World Golf.

On August 25, 2006, In2Games released Real World Golf 2007 in Europe for PlayStation 2 and PC, by which time over 300,000 Gametrak units had been sold.

With the creation of its RealPlay and Gametrak Freedom products, In2Games is no longer developing for the original Gametrak system.

== Gametrak Freedom ==
On October 20, 2006, a next-generation wire-free Gametrak system, using a patent-pending ultrasonic tracking technology, was revealed at a press event in London under the name "Gametrak Fusion".

The system was to utilize a compactible USB-connected base unit and various wireless RF controller units. The standard controller unit was to be a wand which featured interchangeable clip-on heads for applications such as tennis and golf. Custom controller units such as a bowling ball controller were also featured. A concept design was shown for a two-piece wireless motion-sensing gamepad controller that can quickly be split apart or snapped together.

In2Games positioned the control system as a competitive cross-platform alternative to the Wii Remote, targeting it for the PlayStation 3 and Xbox 360 platforms. Originally planned to be released in summer/fall 2007, it was then linked to the game Squeeballs Party, announced at GDC 2009 by PDP and developed by Eiconic Games.

The Gametrak Freedom never went into commercial production past the prototype stage and an application for patent was withdrawn in 2012.

== Related products ==
=== RealPlay ===
On August 17, 2007, In2Games announced RealPlay, a range of family-friendly video games for the PlayStation 2 with wireless motion-sensing controller units similar to those originally shown for then-named Gametrak Fusion, but without the ultrasonic tracking technology. The RealPlay controllers feature accelerometers with a full-scale sensing range of 5 g. The first four RealPlay titles (RealPlay Racing, RealPlay Pool, RealPlay Golf, RealPlay Puzzlesphere) were released in the United Kingdom on November 30, 2007 at a retail price of £34.99 each (approx. US$72, c.2007), with the release of two additional titles (RealPlay Bowling, RealPlay Tennis) in 2008. The company also released the titles outside of the UK.

== Notes ==
a: The Xbox version connects through the Xbox controller port, which uses standard USB signaling, but features proprietary ports.
b: In2Games renamed the title from Black Wind to Dark Wind in late April 2004, to avoid negative publicity after the phrase "black wind of death" was used in a statement published in mid-March from the Abu Hafs al-Masri Brigades to describe a potential strike against America.
