= MTV Music Generator 2 =

2001 video game

- North American PlayStation 2 cover art featuring Funkmaster Flex.
- Developer: Jester Interactive
- Release: EU: 25 May 2001; NA: 7 June 2001
- Platform: PlayStation 2
- Type: Digital audio workstation

MTV Music Generator 2 is a music sequencer program and music video game developed by Jester Interactive and published by Codemasters for PlayStation 2 in 2001. Alongside its music sequencer mode, its multiplayer jam mode makes a return from its predecessor. A sequel, MTV Music Generator 3, was released in 2004.

== Reception ==
Reception

Aggregate score
Aggregator	Score
Metacritic	77/100

Review scores
Publication	Score
AllGame	3.5/5
Electronic Gaming Monthly	6/10 (Note: In Electronic Gaming Monthly's review of the game, two critics gave it each a score of 7.5/10, and another gave it 3/10.)
Game Informer	8.5/10
GamePro	4/5
GameSpot	7/10
GameSpy	68%
GameZone	8/10
IGN	8/10
Official U.S. PlayStation Magazine	3/5
X-Play	4/5

The game received "generally favourable reviews" according to the review aggregation website Metacritic. Matt Hlegeson of Game Informer said, "Hardcore gamers might turn up their noses at a game that offers absolutely no action, but I encourage everyone to take a chance on this extremely unique title. If you have any interest in music whatsoever, I guarantee you'll be hooked." GamePro said that the game "doesn't move the series forward far enough from its PlayStation roots, but if you've got a melodic itch to scratch, it's still worth renting to make your own boogie-down productions." Glenn Rubenstein of Extended Play said, "If you're looking to dabble in creating your own loop-based songs, MTV Music Generator 2 is an excellent introduction to the world of composing music digitally. While not as full-featured as some PC-based programs, it is amazing, because it allows you to do so much on a console system at the average cost of a videogame. And who knows? With a little proficiency and creativity, it is entirely possible that someone could use this title to create music that launches a career." Douglass C. Perry of IGN said, "You must really, truly, dearly want to make music -- and be good at reading pages of instructions and have lots of patience -- to buy this game." GameZone said, "If you are a big music fan, and are willing to spend countless hours customizing your music, you should definitely check this game out. Otherwise, a rental will probably do."

However, Jay Semerad of AllGame said, "Eventually, the greatest downfall of MTV Music Generator 2 lies in its replay value. After a while, the primary songs lose their freshness and a user might feel trapped in a world of fixed samples." Greg Kasavin of GameSpot said of the game, "It's not suitable for everyone, and it will require considerable time and effort on your part in order to produce satisfying results. This same time and effort could just as well be spent learning the actual tools of the trade." Andrei Alupului of PlanetPS2 said, "You're better off getting some PC sound software if you'd really like it, but if you do decide to check out MG2, make sure you bring your patience. You're going to need it." Official U.S. PlayStation Magazine called it "A diversion, not a usable tool."
