= Sprite multiplexing =

Computer Graphic Technique

Sprite multiplexing is a computer graphics technique where additional sprites (moving images) can be drawn on the screen, beyond the nominal maximum. It is largely historical, applicable principally to older hardware, where limited resources (such as CPU speed and memory) meant only a relatively small number of sprites were supported. On the other hand, it is also true that without multiplexing, the sprite circuitry would be idle much of the time, and limited resources were wasted.

== Description ==
The sprite multiplexing technique is based on the idea that while the hardware may only support a finite number of sprites, it is sometimes possible to re-use the same sprite "slots" more than once per frame or scan line. The program will first use the hardware to draw one or more sprite(s), as normal. Before the next frame (or next scanline) needs to be drawn, the software reprograms the hardware to display additional sprites, in other positions.

For example, the Nintendo Entertainment System explicitly supports hardware sprite multiplexing, where it has 64 hardware sprites, but is only capable of rendering 8 of them per scanline. On the older Atari 2600, sprite multiplexing was not intentionally designed in, but programmers discovered they could reset the TIA graphics chip to draw additional sprites on the same scanline.

The sprite multiplexing technique relies on the program being able to identify what part of the video screen is being drawn at the moment, or being triggered by the video hardware to run a subroutine at the crucial moment. The programmer must carefully consider the layout of the screen. If the video graphics hardware is not reprogrammed in time for the extra sprites to be displayed, they will not appear, or will be drawn incorrectly.

Modern video graphics hardware typically does not use hardware sprites, since modern computer systems do not have the kind of limitations that sprite hardware is designed to circumvent.

== Implementations ==
Systems that allow the programmer to employ the sprite multiplexing technique include:

- Atari 2600
- Atari 8-bit computers
- Amiga
- Commodore 64
- MSX
- Nintendo Entertainment System
- Super Nintendo Entertainment System
- Master System
- Sega Genesis/Mega Drive
