= Shadow of the Beast II =

1990 video game

- Cover art by Roger Dean
- Developer: Reflections
- Publisher: Psygnosis
- Designers: Paul Howarth; Martin Edmondson
- Programmer: Phil Betts
- Artist: Jim Bowers
- Composers: Tim Wright; Lee Wright
- Platforms: Amiga, Atari ST, FM Towns, Mega Drive, Mega-CD
- Release: EU/NA: 1990
- Genre: Platform
- Mode: Single-player

Shadow of the Beast II is a platform game developed by Reflections and published by Psygnosis in 1990. It is the sequel to the earlier Shadow of the Beast.

== Plot and gameplay ==
Shadow of the Beast II (Amiga)

Shadow of the Beast II finds the hero Aarbron in half-beast form, wandering the lands of Karamoon in search of his kidnapped sister. She had been taken away from her mother's cottage by the dragon-form of the Beast Mage, Zelek, servant to Maletoth. Along the way, Aarbron befriends the wise dragon Barloom and an unnamed wizard (referred as the "Old Man") and must defeat the evil dragon Ishran. Tree Pygmies in the forest and the goblins in the Crystal Caverns serve as foes.

== Production ==
As in the first game, the cover art for Shadow of the Beast II was created by Roger Dean and the game was packaged with a promotional black T-shirt that featured Dean's artwork.

The music for Shadow of the Beast II and III was composed and produced by Tim Wright. These titles featured a more extensive soundtrack and utilised ethnic samples taken from among other sources the same Korg M1 synthesizer that was sampled by David Whittaker for the original game (although in this case, it was the rack-mounted version the Korg M1/R). Shadow of the Beast II contained a total of 17 tracks, most notable of which are the title theme and the game over theme, both of which feature real sampled electric guitars.

== Ports ==
Shadow of the Beast II was ported to the Atari ST and FM-Towns computers, as well as the Mega Drive and Mega-CD platforms. The Mega-CD version had drastic changes made to it, the most noticeable being a new soundtrack complete with voice acted dialogue sequences and added FMVs. The in-game graphics were also slightly enhanced, and some areas of the game were redesigned to be less difficult than the original.

== Reception ==
Shadow of the Beast and Shadow of the Beast II were reviewed in 1991 in Dragon where both games received ratings of 5 out of 5 stars.

A reviewer for Next Generation gave the Sega CD version one out of five stars, saying that the game had been good at the time of its release on the Amiga four years before, but was now horribly outdated: "Even though the designers tried to spruce it up by adding better music, digitized speech, and a few rendered cut scenes, it still doesn't help much considering the game's overall stilted animation and poor control."
