= List of downloadable PlayStation 2 games =

This is a list of PlayStation 2 games later made available for purchase and download from the PlayStation Store for the PlayStation 3 (PS3), PlayStation 4 (PS4), or PlayStation 5 (PS5) video game consoles. Unlike PlayStation 2 Classics on the PS3, the PS4 and PS5 releases run at a higher resolution and may feature Trophies, Remote Play and Share Play. PlayStation 4 releases are also playable on PlayStation 5.

There are 377 downloadable games out of the 4491 originally released for PlayStation 2. (Note: This number is always up to date by this script.)

- A red cell indicates that the title is no longer available for purchase on the PlayStation Store.
- A † indicates that the game is also available in the Classics Catalog for PlayStation Plus Premium subscribers.

== List of games ==
Title	Developer(s)	Publisher(s)	PlayStation 3			PlayStation 4			PlayStation 5			Ref.
Title	Developer(s)	Publisher(s)	JP	NA	EU	JP	NA	EU	JP	NA	EU	Ref.
10 Pin: Champions Alley		OG International	Unreleased		Jun 19, 2013	Unreleased			Unreleased			
1945 I & II The Arcade Games		Play It!	Unreleased		Jun 27, 2012	Unreleased			Unreleased			
A-Train 6		Artdink	Unreleased		Feb 15, 2012	Unreleased			Unreleased			
Ace Combat 5: The Unsung War (Note: Only available as a bonus with pre-orders of Ace Combat 7: Skies Unknown.)	Project Aces	Bandai Namco Entertainment	Unreleased			Jan 17, 2019	Jan 18, 2019		Unreleased			
ADK Damashii	ADK	SNK	Mar 18, 2015	Unreleased		Unreleased	Feb 24, 2017	Mar 1, 2017	Unreleased			
The Adventures of Cookie & Cream		From Software	Unreleased	Nov 5, 2013	Unreleased	Unreleased			Unreleased			
Akai Ito		Hamster	Oct 16, 2013	Unreleased		Unreleased			Unreleased			
Alfa Romeo Racing Italiano		Milestone srl	Unreleased	Jun 4, 2013	Unreleased	Unreleased			Unreleased			
Alter Echo		Nordic Games	Unreleased	Mar 10, 2015	Apr 15, 2015	Unreleased			Unreleased			
Ape Escape 2 †	Japan Studio	Sony Interactive Entertainment	Unreleased			Unreleased	Aug 2, 2016		Unreleased			
Ape Escape 3		Sony Interactive Entertainment	Nov 19, 2014	Unreleased		Unreleased			Unreleased			
Arc the Lad: Twilight of the Spirits †	Cattle Call	Sony Interactive Entertainment	Sep 17, 2014	Unreleased		Unreleased	Jan 12, 2016		Unreleased			
The Arcade		Oxygen Games	Unreleased		Sep 19, 2012	Unreleased			Unreleased			
Arcade Classics Volume 1		Play It!	Unreleased		Feb 15, 2012	Unreleased			Unreleased			
Art of Fighting Anthology	SNK	SNK	Jul 15, 2015	Unreleased		Unreleased	Aug 30, 2017	Aug 29, 2017	Unreleased			
Baroque		Sting Entertainment	Unreleased		Oct 24, 2012	Unreleased			Unreleased			
BCV: Battle Construction Vehicles		Artdink	Unreleased		Feb 29, 2012	Unreleased			Unreleased			
Black Market Bowling		Midas Interactive Entertainment	Unreleased		Sep 19, 2012	Unreleased			Unreleased			
BloodRayne		Majesco	Unreleased	Nov 1, 2011	Unreleased	Unreleased			Unreleased			
BloodRayne 2		Majesco	Unreleased	Jul 3, 2012	Unreleased	Unreleased			Unreleased			
BlowOut		Majesco	Unreleased	Feb 11, 2014	Unreleased	Unreleased			Unreleased			
Bolt		Disney Interactive Studios	Unreleased		Mar 6, 2013	Unreleased			Unreleased			
Breath of Fire: Dragon Quarter		Capcom	Feb 17, 2016	Unreleased		Unreleased			Unreleased			
Bully	Rockstar Vancouver	Rockstar Games	Mar 19, 2014	Dec 18, 2012	Dec 19, 2012	Unreleased	Mar 22, 2016		Unreleased			
Bust-A-Bloc		Midas Interactive Entertainment	Unreleased		Feb 15, 2012	Unreleased			Unreleased			
Capcom Fighting Evolution		Capcom	Dec 19, 2012	Sep 17, 2013	Dec 19, 2012	Unreleased			Unreleased			
Capcom vs. SNK 2		Capcom	Sep 19, 2012	Jul 16, 2013	Dec 11, 2013	Unreleased			Unreleased			
Cars		Disney Interactive Studios	Unreleased	Mar 17, 2015	Unreleased	Unreleased			Unreleased			
Cars Mater-National Championship		Disney Interactive Studios	Unreleased		Feb 13, 2013	Unreleased			Unreleased			
Castle Shikigami 2		Alfa System	Unreleased	Jul 9, 2013	Jun 27, 2012	Unreleased			Unreleased			
Castlevania: Lament of Innocence		Konami	Aug 22, 2012	Jun 18, 2013	Aug 22, 2012	Unreleased			Unreleased			
Cel Damage Overdrive		Finish Line Games	Unreleased		Feb 15, 2012	Unreleased			Unreleased			
Chess Challenger		Play It!	Unreleased		Jul 4, 2012	Unreleased			Unreleased			
Chicken Little		Disney Interactive Studios	Unreleased		Feb 15, 2012	Unreleased			Unreleased			
The Chronicles of Narnia: Prince Caspian		Traveller's Tales	Unreleased		Oct 24, 2012	Unreleased			Unreleased			
The Chronicles of Narnia: The Lion, the Witch and the Wardrobe		Traveller's Tales	Unreleased	Oct 16, 2012	Feb 15, 2012	Unreleased			Unreleased			
Chulip		Natsume Inc.	Unreleased	Dec 4, 2012	Unreleased	Unreleased			Unreleased			
Conflict: Desert Storm II		Square Enix	Unreleased		May 23, 2012	Unreleased			Unreleased			
Conflict: Vietnam		Square Enix	Unreleased		May 30, 2012	Unreleased			Unreleased			
Contra: Shattered Soldier		Konami	Jul 25, 2012	Jun 11, 2013	Unreleased	Unreleased			Unreleased			
The Conveni 3		Hamster	Nov 21, 2012	Unreleased		Unreleased			Unreleased			
Corvette Evolution GT		Milestone srl	Unreleased	Jun 18, 2013	Unreleased	Unreleased			Unreleased			
Crazy Golf: World Tour		Liquid Games	Unreleased		Jul 4, 2012	Unreleased			Unreleased			
Crimson Sea 2		Koei Tecmo	Unreleased	Aug 27, 2013	Unreleased	Unreleased			Unreleased			
Cue Academy: Snooker, Pool, Billiards		Midas Interactive Entertainment	Unreleased		Feb 29, 2012	Unreleased			Unreleased			
Cyber Troopers Virtual-On Marz		Sega	Mar 21, 2013	Unreleased		Unreleased			Unreleased			
Dark Chronicle †	Level-5	Sony Interactive Entertainment	Unreleased			Unreleased	Jan 19, 2016		Unreleased			
Dark Cloud †	Level-5	Sony Interactive Entertainment	August 22, 2012	Unreleased		Unreleased	Dec 5, 2015		Unreleased			
Dead or Alive 2: Hardcore		Koei Tecmo	August 22, 2012	Mar 24, 2015	Unreleased	Unreleased			Unreleased			
Deadly Strike		Midas Interactive Entertainment	Unreleased		Apr 18, 2012	Unreleased			Unreleased			
Demon Chaos		Genki	Aug 20, 2014	Unreleased		Unreleased			Unreleased			
Destroy All Humans!	Pandemic Studios	THQ Nordic	Unreleased			Unreleased	Nov 1, 2016		Unreleased			
Destroy All Humans! 2	Pandemic Studios	THQ Nordic	Unreleased			Unreleased	Nov 29, 2016	Nov 30, 2016	Unreleased			
Deus Ex: The Conspiracy †	Ion Storm	Eidos Interactive Corp	Unreleased			Unreleased	Jun 17, 2025		Unreleased	Jun 17, 2025		
Devil Summoner: Raidou Kuzunoha vs. The Soulless Army		Atlus	Unreleased	Apr 1, 2014	Unreleased	Unreleased			Unreleased			
Devil Summoner 2: Raidou Kuzunoha vs. King Abaddon		Atlus	Unreleased	Jun 24, 2014	Unreleased	Unreleased			Unreleased			
Dirt Track Devils		Midas Interactive Entertainment	Unreleased		Apr 18, 2012	Unreleased			Unreleased			
Disaster Report		Granzella Inc.	Feb 18, 2015	Unreleased		Unreleased			Unreleased			
Disgaea: Hour of Darkness		Nippon Ichi Software	Unreleased	Jan 15, 2013	Unreleased	Unreleased			Unreleased			
Disgaea 2: Cursed Memories		Nippon Ichi Software	Unreleased	Jan 22, 2013	Unreleased	Unreleased			Unreleased			
Disney Princess: Enchanted Journey		Disney Interactive Studios	Unreleased		Feb 15, 2012	Unreleased			Unreleased			
Disney's Kim Possible: What's the Switch?		Disney Interactive Studios	Unreleased		Feb 15, 2012	Unreleased			Unreleased			
Disney's PK: Out of the Shadows		Disney Interactive Studios	Unreleased		Jul 4, 2012	Unreleased			Unreleased			
Disney's Stitch: Experiment 626		Disney Interactive Studios	Unreleased		Apr 2, 2014	Unreleased			Unreleased			
Doko Demo Issho: Watashi Naehon		Sony Interactive Entertainment	Mar 18, 2015	Unreleased		Unreleased			Unreleased			
Donald Duck: Goin' Quackers		Disney Interactive Studios	Unreleased		Feb 15, 2012	Unreleased			Unreleased			
Dora's Big Birthday Adventure		Take 2 Interactive	Unreleased	Feb 26, 2013	Unreleased	Unreleased			Unreleased			
Dora the Explorer: Dora Saves the Crystal Kingdom		Take 2 Interactive	Unreleased	Jan 8, 2013	Unreleased	Unreleased			Unreleased			
Dora the Explorer: Dora Saves the Mermaids		Take 2 Interactive	Unreleased	Jan 8, 2013	Feb 27, 2013	Unreleased			Unreleased			
Dora the Explorer: Dora Saves the Snow Princess		Take 2 Interactive	Unreleased	Jan 8, 2013	Jan 30, 2013	Unreleased			Unreleased			
Dual Hearts		Sony Interactive Entertainment	Jan 21, 2015	Unreleased		Unreleased			Unreleased			
Dynasty Tactics 2		Koei Tecmo	Unreleased	Jul 9, 2013	Unreleased	Unreleased			Unreleased			
Dynasty Warriors 2		Koei Tecmo	Nov 28, 2012	Unreleased		Unreleased			Unreleased			
Dynasty Warriors 3		Koei Tecmo	Jan 16, 2013	Unreleased		Unreleased			Unreleased			
Dynasty Warriors 4		Koei Tecmo	Apr 17, 2013	Unreleased	Jan 30, 2013	Unreleased			Unreleased			
Dynasty Warriors 4: Empires		Koei Tecmo	Unreleased		Jan 30, 2013	Unreleased			Unreleased			
Dynasty Warriors 5		Koei Tecmo	May 15, 2013	Unreleased	Jan 30, 2013	Unreleased			Unreleased			
Eternal Quest		Midas Interactive Entertainment	Unreleased		Apr 25, 2012	Unreleased			Unreleased			
Eternal Ring	FromSoftware	Agetec	Unreleased			Unreleased	May 23, 2017	Unreleased	Unreleased			
Euro Rally Champion		Oxygen Games	Unreleased		Jul 4, 2012	Unreleased			Unreleased			
Everybody's Tennis †	Clap Hanz	Sony Interactive Entertainment	Unreleased			Unreleased	Sep 13, 2016		Unreleased			
Fahrenheit	Quantic Dream	Quantic Dream	Unreleased			Unreleased	Aug 9, 2016	Aug 10, 2016	Unreleased			
FantaVision †	Japan Studio	Sony Interactive Entertainment	Unreleased			Unreleased	Dec 22, 2015		Unreleased			
Fatal Frame	Tecmo	Tecmo	Unreleased	Apr 9, 2013	Unreleased	Unreleased			Unreleased			
Fatal Frame II: Crimson Butterfly	Tecmo	Tecmo	Unreleased	May 7, 2013	Unreleased	Unreleased			Unreleased			
Fatal Frame III: The Tormented	Tecmo	Tecmo	Unreleased	Oct 2, 2013	Unreleased	Unreleased			Unreleased			
Fatal Fury Battle Archives: Volume 2	SNK	SNK	Aug 19, 2015	Unreleased		Unreleased	Mar 27, 2017	Mar 28, 2017	Unreleased			
Finding Nemo		Disney Interactive Studios	Unreleased		Feb 27, 2013	Unreleased			Unreleased			
Finny the Fish & the Seven Waters		Sony Interactive Entertainment	Aug 21, 2013	Unreleased		Unreleased			Unreleased			
Fire Pro Wrestling Returns		Spike Chunsoft	Unreleased	Apr 23, 2013	Unreleased	Unreleased			Unreleased			
Football Generation		Midas Interactive Entertainment	Unreleased		Jun 13, 2012	Unreleased			Unreleased			
Formula Challenge		Oxygen Games	Unreleased		Jul 4, 2012	Unreleased			Unreleased			
Fruit Machine Mania		OG International Ltd	Unreleased		Sep 19, 2012	Unreleased			Unreleased			
Full House Kiss		Capcom	Oct 17, 2012	Unreleased		Unreleased			Unreleased			
Full Spectrum Warrior		Nordic Games	Unreleased	Nov 8, 2011	Mar 28, 2012	Unreleased			Unreleased			
Full Spectrum Warrior: Ten Hammers		Nordic Games	Unreleased	Feb 21, 2012	Unreleased	Unreleased			Unreleased			
Fūraiki		Full On Games	Nov 18, 2015	Unreleased		Unreleased			Unreleased			
Fūraiki 2		Full On Games	Nov 18, 2015	Unreleased		Unreleased			Unreleased			
Fu-un Shinsengumi		Genki	Jun 18, 2014	Unreleased		Unreleased			Unreleased			
Fu-un Bakumatsu-den		Genki	Dec 17, 2014	Unreleased		Unreleased			Unreleased			
Fu'un Super Combo		SNK	Aug 19, 2015	Unreleased		Unreleased	Dec 20, 2016	Dec 23, 2016	Unreleased			
G-Force		Disney Interactive Studios	Unreleased		Oct 24, 2012	Unreleased			Unreleased			
G1 Jockey 4		Koei Tecmo	Unreleased		Feb 27, 2013	Unreleased			Unreleased			
Gacharoku		Sony Interactive Entertainment	Nov 21, 2012	Unreleased		Unreleased			Unreleased			
Gadget Racers		Midas Interactive Entertainment	Unreleased		Feb 15, 2012	Unreleased			Unreleased			
Garou: Mark of the Wolves		SNK	Jun 17, 2015	Unreleased		Unreleased			Unreleased			
Ghosthunter †	SCEE Studio Cambridge	Sony Interactive Entertainment	Unreleased			Jun 18, 2024			Jun 18, 2024			
Gitaroo Man		Koei Tecmo	Unreleased			Jun 16, 2026			Jun 16, 2026			
Go, Diego, Go! Great Dinosaur Rescue		Take 2 Interactive	Unreleased	Jan 8, 2013	Unreleased	Unreleased			Unreleased			
Go, Diego, Go! Safari Rescue		Take 2 Interactive	Unreleased	Jan 8, 2013	Mar 13, 2013	Unreleased			Unreleased			
God Hand		Capcom	Unreleased	Oct 4, 2011	Feb 15, 2012	Unreleased			Unreleased			
Golden Age of Racing		Midas Interactive Entertainment	Unreleased		Feb 15, 2012	Unreleased			Unreleased			
Gradius V		Konami	Apr 15, 2015	Apr 17, 2015	Apr 22, 2015	Unreleased			Unreleased			
Grand Theft Auto III	DMA Design	Rockstar Games	Unreleased	Sep 25, 2012	Sep 26, 2012	Unreleased	Dec 5, 2015		Unreleased			
Grand Theft Auto: Liberty City Stories		Rockstar Games	Unreleased	Apr 2, 2013	Apr 3, 2013	Unreleased			Unreleased			
Grand Theft Auto: San Andreas	Rockstar North	Rockstar Games	Aug 26, 2015	Dec 11, 2012 (emulated PS2 Classic, Dec 5, 2015 (native PS3)	Dec 12, 2012	Unreleased	Dec 5, 2015		Unreleased			
Grand Theft Auto: Vice City	Rockstar North	Rockstar Games	Aug 26, 2015	Jan 29, 2013	Jan 30, 2013	Unreleased	Dec 5, 2015		Unreleased			
Grand Theft Auto: Vice City Stories		Rockstar Games	Unreleased	Apr 2, 2013	Apr 3, 2013	Unreleased			Unreleased			
Grandia II		Game Arts	Nov 19, 2014	Unreleased		Unreleased			Unreleased			
Grandia III		Game Arts	Jan 21, 2015	Jul 21, 2016	Unreleased	Unreleased			Unreleased			
Grandia Xtreme		Game Arts	Dec 17, 2014	Unreleased		Unreleased			Unreleased			
GrimGrimoire		Nippon Ichi Software	Dec 17, 2014	Oct 4, 2011	Unreleased	Unreleased			Unreleased			
Groove Rider: Slot Car Racing		Play It!	Unreleased		Jun 27, 2012	Unreleased			Unreleased			
Growlanser: Heritage of War		Atlus	Unreleased	Mar 4, 2014	Unreleased	Unreleased			Unreleased			
GT Racers		Oxygen Games	Unreleased		Aug 15, 2012	Unreleased			Unreleased			
Gungrave: Overdose		RED Entertainment	Unreleased	Aug 21, 2012	Feb 15, 2012	Unreleased			Unreleased			
Harvest Moon: A Wonderful Life Special Edition	Victor Interactive Software	Natsume Inc.	Unreleased	Sep 18, 2012	Unreleased	Unreleased	Mar 28, 2017		Unreleased			
Harvest Moon: Save the Homeland	Victor Interactive Software	Natsume Inc.	Unreleased	Nov 1, 2011	Unreleased	Unreleased	May 9, 2017		Unreleased			
Haunting Ground		Capcom	Apr 21, 2015	Unreleased		Unreleased			Unreleased			
Hawk Superbike Racing		Midas Interactive Entertainment	Unreleased		Feb 22, 2012	Unreleased			Unreleased			
Heavenly Guardian		Starfish(ja)	Jul 17, 2013	Oct 8, 2013	Unreleased	Unreleased			Unreleased			
Impossible Mission		System 3	Unreleased		Jul 25, 2012	Unreleased			Unreleased			
The Incredibles		Disney Interactive Studios	Unreleased	Sep 30, 2014	Feb 27, 2013	Unreleased			Unreleased			
The Incredibles: Rise of the Underminer		Disney Interactive Studios	Unreleased		Mar 13, 2013	Unreleased			Unreleased			
Indiana Jones and the Staff of Kings †	Artificial Mind & Movement	Disney Interactive Studios	Unreleased			Unreleased	Jan 21, 2025		Jan 21, 2025			
Innocent Life: A Futuristic Harvest Moon		Natsume Inc.	Unreleased	Oct 2, 2012	Unreleased	Unreleased			Unreleased			
Intellivision Lives!		Realtime Associates	Unreleased		Apr 3, 2013	Unreleased			Unreleased			
International Super Karts		Midas Interactive Entertainment	Unreleased		Feb 15, 2012	Unreleased			Unreleased			
International Tennis Pro		Midas Interactive Entertainment	Unreleased		Apr 18, 2012	Unreleased			Unreleased			
Jade Cocoon 2		Genki	Apr 15, 2015	Unreleased		Unreleased			Unreleased			
Jak and Daxter: The Precursor Legacy †	Naughty Dog	Sony Interactive Entertainment	Unreleased			Sep 14, 2017	Aug 22, 2017	Aug 23, 2017	Dec 10, 2024			
Jak II †	Naughty Dog	Sony Interactive Entertainment	Unreleased			Dec 6, 2017			Unreleased			
Jak 3 †	Naughty Dog	Sony Interactive Entertainment	Unreleased			Dec 21, 2017	Dec 6, 2017		Unreleased			
Jak X: Combat Racing †	Naughty Dog	Sony Interactive Entertainment	Unreleased			Mar 15, 2018	Dec 6, 2017		Unreleased			
Just Cause		Square Enix	Unreleased	May 9, 2012	Unreleased	Unreleased			Unreleased			
Ka 2: Let's Go Hawaii		Sony Interactive Entertainment	Apr 15, 2015	Unreleased		Unreleased			Unreleased			
Katamari Damacy		Bandai Namco Entertainment	Nov 21, 2012	Apr 30, 2013	Unreleased	Unreleased			Unreleased			
Kengo	Genki	Genki	Apr 16, 2014	Unreleased		Unreleased			Unreleased			
Kengo 2	Lightweight	Genki	Oct 15, 2014	Unreleased		Unreleased			Unreleased			
Kengo 3	Lightweight	Genki	Nov 18, 2015	Unreleased		Unreleased			Unreleased			
Kessen		Koei Tecmo	Jul 25, 2012	Unreleased		Unreleased			Unreleased			
Kessen II		Koei Tecmo	Unreleased	Mar 12, 2013	Unreleased	Unreleased			Unreleased			
Kessen III		Koei Tecmo	Unreleased	Aug 20, 2013	Jan 30, 2013	Unreleased			Unreleased			
Kinetica †	Santa Monica Studio	Sony Interactive Entertainment	Unreleased			Unreleased	May 17, 2016		Unreleased			
King of Clubs		Oxygen Games	Unreleased		Sep 19, 2012	Unreleased			Unreleased			
The King of Fighters '98: Ultimate Match	SNK	SNK	Nov 19, 2014	Unreleased		Unreleased	Mar 20, 2018		Unreleased			
The King of Fighters 2000	SNK	SNK	Mar 18, 2015	Unreleased		Unreleased	May 3, 2016	Aug 24, 2016	Unreleased			
The King of Fighters Collection: The Orochi Saga	SNK, Terminal Reality	SNK	Jul 15, 2015	Unreleased		Unreleased	Jun 26, 2018	Jun 27, 2018	Unreleased			
King of Fighters: Maximum Impact: Maniax		SNK	Feb 18, 2015	Unreleased		Unreleased			Unreleased			
King of Fighters: Maximum Impact Regulation A		SNK	May 20, 2015	Unreleased		Unreleased			Unreleased			
The King of Fighters '94: Re-Bout		SNK	Jan 21, 2015	Unreleased		Unreleased			Unreleased			
The King of Fighters 2001		SNK	Jul 15, 2015	Unreleased		Unreleased			Unreleased			
The King of Fighters 2002		SNK	May 20, 2015	Unreleased		Unreleased			Unreleased			
The King of Fighters 2003		SNK	Apr 15, 2015	Unreleased		Unreleased			Unreleased			
The King of Fighters 2006		SNK	Apr 15, 2015	Unreleased		Unreleased			Unreleased			
The King of Fighters XI		SNK	Dec 17, 2014	Unreleased		Unreleased			Unreleased			
The King of Fighters Neowave		SNK	Aug 19, 2015	Unreleased		Unreleased			Unreleased			
The King of Fighters NESTS Collection		SNK	Jun 17, 2015	Unreleased		Unreleased			Unreleased			
Kouenji Onago Soccer		Starfish SD	Jun 19, 2013	Unreleased		Unreleased			Unreleased			
La Pucelle: Tactics		Nippon Ichi Software	Unreleased	Sep 11, 2012	Unreleased	Unreleased			Unreleased			
Lake Masters EX		Midas Interactive Entertainment	Unreleased		Mar 27, 2013	Unreleased			Unreleased			
Leaderboard Golf		Midas Interactive Entertainment	Unreleased		Feb 29, 2012	Unreleased			Unreleased			
Legaia 2: Duel Saga		Sony Interactive Entertainment	Feb 18, 2015	Unreleased		Unreleased			Unreleased			
Legend of Kay		Nordic Games	Unreleased		Jan 29, 2014	Unreleased			Unreleased			
LEGO Star Wars II: The Original Trilogy		LucasArts	Unreleased		Oct 8, 2014	Unreleased			Unreleased			
Mad Maestro!		Sony Interactive Entertainment	May 20, 2015	Unreleased		Unreleased			Unreleased			
Maken Shao: Demon Sword		Atlus	Unreleased		Mar 13, 2013	Unreleased			Unreleased			
Mana Khemia 2: Fall of Alchemy		Gust	Jun 27, 2013	Unreleased		Unreleased			Unreleased			
Manhunt	Rockstar North	Rockstar Games	Unreleased	May 14, 2013	May 15, 2013	Unreleased	Mar 22, 2016		Unreleased			
Mark Davis Pro Bass Challenge		Natsume Inc.	Unreleased	Jan 28, 2014	Unreleased	Unreleased			Unreleased			
The Mark of Kri †	San Diego Studio	Sony Interactive Entertainment	Unreleased	Sep 24, 2013	Unreleased	Unreleased	Dec 5, 2015		Unreleased			
Max Payne	Remedy Entertainment, Rockstar Canada	Rockstar Games	Unreleased	May 1, 2013	May 2, 2013	Unreleased	Apr 22, 2016		Unreleased			
Maximo: Ghosts to Glory		Capcom	Unreleased	Oct 4, 2011	Feb 15, 2012	Unreleased			Unreleased			
Maximo vs. Army of Zin		Capcom	Unreleased		Feb 15, 2012	Unreleased			Unreleased			
Medal of Honor: European Assault		Electronic Arts	Unreleased		Feb 13, 2013	Unreleased			Unreleased			
Meet the Robinsons		Disney Interactive Studios	Unreleased	Sep 16, 2014	Feb 15, 2012	Unreleased			Unreleased			
Mega Man X: Command Mission		Capcom	Unreleased			Sep 15, 2026			Sep 15, 2026			
Mega Man X8		Capcom	Dec 16, 2015	Unreleased		Unreleased			Unreleased			
Mercenaries: Playground of Destruction		Electronic Arts	Unreleased		Apr 29, 2015	Unreleased			Unreleased			
Metal Slug 3		SNK	Nov 19, 2014	Unreleased		Unreleased			Unreleased			
Metal Slug 4		SNK	Jul 15, 2015	Unreleased		Unreleased			Unreleased			
Metal Slug 5		SNK	Mar 18, 2015	Unreleased		Unreleased			Unreleased			
Metal Slug 6		SNK	May 20, 2015	Unreleased		Unreleased			Unreleased			
Metal Slug Anthology	Terminal Reality	SNK Playmore	Aug 19, 2015	Unreleased		Unreleased	Jul 5, 2016	Sep 20, 2016	Unreleased			
Midnight Club: Street Racing		Rockstar Games	Unreleased	Mar 5, 2013	Mar 6, 2013	Unreleased			Unreleased			
Midnight Club II		Rockstar Games	Unreleased	Mar 5, 2013	Mar 6, 2013	Unreleased			Unreleased			
Midnight Club 3: DUB Edition Remix		Rockstar Games	Unreleased	Dec 18, 2012	Dec 21, 2012	Unreleased			Unreleased			
Mister Mosquito	Zoom	Sony Interactive Entertainment	Unreleased			Unreleased	Sep 17, 2024		Sep 17, 2024			
Monsters, Inc. (Note: Includes LittleBigPlanet 3 Monsters, Inc. Costume Pack)		Disney Interactive Studios	Unreleased	Oct 7, 2014	Unreleased	Unreleased			Unreleased			
Monsters, Inc. Scream Team		Disney Interactive Studios	Unreleased		Mar 13, 2013	Unreleased			Unreleased			
Motorsiege: Warriors of Primetime		Play It!	Unreleased		Apr 17, 2013	Unreleased			Unreleased			
Mr. Golf		Artdink	Unreleased		Feb 15, 2012	Unreleased			Unreleased			
MX vs. ATV: Untamed		Nordic Games	Unreleased	Mar 31, 2015	Unreleased	Unreleased			Unreleased			
MX World Tour Featuring Jamie Little		System 3	Unreleased		Feb 15, 2012	Unreleased			Unreleased			
Mystic Heroes		Koei Tecmo	Unreleased	Sep 10, 2013	Unreleased	Unreleased			Unreleased			
Naval Ops: Commander		Koei Tecmo	Unreleased	Aug 20, 2013	Unreleased	Unreleased			Unreleased			
Need for Speed: Most Wanted		Electronic Arts	Unreleased	May 22, 2012	Feb 22, 2012	Unreleased			Unreleased			
Neo Contra		Konami	Sep 19, 2012	Feb 18, 2014	Feb 15, 2012	Unreleased			Unreleased			
NeoGeo Battle Coliseum		SNK	Feb 18, 2015	Unreleased		Unreleased			Unreleased			
Ninkyouden: Toseinin Ichidaiki		Genki	Jun 17, 2015	Unreleased		Unreleased			Unreleased			
Noble Racing		Midas Interactive Entertainment	Unreleased		Feb 15, 2012	Unreleased			Unreleased			
Nobunaga's Ambition: Iron Triangle		Koei Tecmo	Unreleased	Mar 26, 2013	Unreleased	Unreleased			Unreleased			
Nobunaga's Ambition: Rise to Power		Koei Tecmo	Unreleased	Oct 30, 2012	Unreleased	Unreleased			Unreleased			
Odin Sphere		Atlus	Unreleased	Oct 4, 2011	Unreleased	Unreleased			Unreleased			
Okage: Shadow King †	Zener Works	Sony Interactive Entertainment	Unreleased			Unreleased	Mar 22, 2016	Mar 23, 2016	Unreleased			
Operation Air Assault		Midas Interactive Entertainment	Unreleased		Feb 22, 2012	Unreleased			Unreleased			
Pacific Air Warriors II		Midas Interactive Entertainment	Unreleased		Feb 22, 2012	Unreleased			Unreleased			
PaRappa the Rapper 2 †	NanaOn-Sha	Sony Interactive Entertainment	Unreleased			Unreleased	Dec 15, 2015		Unreleased			
PDC World Championship Darts 2008		Oxygen Games	Unreleased		Jul 4, 2012	Unreleased			Unreleased			
Perfect Ace 2: The Championships		Oxygen Games	Unreleased		Sep 19, 2012	Unreleased			Unreleased			
Persona 3 FES		Atlus	Unreleased	Apr 10, 2012	Feb 12, 2014	Unreleased			Unreleased			
Persona 4		Atlus	Unreleased	Apr 8, 2014	Unreleased	Unreleased			Unreleased			
Peter Pan: Return to Neverland		Disney Interactive Studios	Unreleased		Feb 22, 2012	Unreleased			Unreleased			
Pilot Down: Behind Enemy Lines		Oxygen Games	Unreleased		Jul 25, 2012	Unreleased			Unreleased			
Pinball Hall of Fame: The Gottlieb Collection		FarSight Studios	Unreleased		Apr 3, 2013	Unreleased			Unreleased			
Pirates of the Caribbean: At World's End		Disney Interactive Studios	Unreleased		Apr 2, 2014	Unreleased			Unreleased			
Pirates: Legend of the Black Buccaneer		Valcon Games	Unreleased	Jun 11, 2013	Unreleased	Unreleased			Unreleased			
Play It Pinball		Play It!	Unreleased		Jul 4, 2012	Unreleased			Unreleased			
Pool Shark 2		Funbox Media	Unreleased		Jul 4, 2012	Unreleased			Unreleased			
Powershot Pinball		OG International Ltd	Unreleased		Sep 19, 2012	Unreleased			Unreleased			
Primal †	Cambridge Studio	Sony Interactive Entertainment	Unreleased	Feb 28, 2012	Unreleased	Unreleased	May 31, 2016		Unreleased			
Psychonauts	Double Fine Productions	Double Fine Productions	Unreleased	Aug 28, 2012	Unreleased	Unreleased	Jun 7, 2016	Jul 20, 2016	Unreleased			
Psyvariar -Complete Edition-		Hamster	Apr 17, 2013	Unreleased		Unreleased			Unreleased			
P.T.O. IV		Koei Tecmo	Unreleased	Jul 30, 2013	Unreleased	Unreleased			Unreleased			
Puzzle Quest: Challenge of the Warlords	Infinite Interactive	D3 Publisher	Unreleased			Unreleased	Feb 24, 2016	Mar 1, 2016 (Note: Released only in the UK and Ireland.)	Unreleased			
Raceway: Drag & Stock Racing		Midas Interactive Entertainment	Unreleased		Feb 22, 2012	Unreleased			Unreleased			
Raiden III		MOSS	Unreleased	Nov 1, 2011	Unreleased	Unreleased			Unreleased			
Raw Danger!		Granzella Inc.	Feb 18, 2015	Unreleased		Unreleased			Unreleased			
Rayman 2: Revolution		Ubisoft	Unreleased	May 1, 2012	Unreleased	Unreleased			Unreleased			
Rayman Arena		Ubisoft	Unreleased	May 29, 2012	Unreleased	Unreleased			Unreleased			
Rebel Raiders: Operation Nighthawk		Sony Interactive Entertainment	Unreleased	Feb 12, 2013	Unreleased	Unreleased			Unreleased			
Red Dead Revolver	Rockstar San Diego	Rockstar Games	Unreleased	Dec 18, 2012	Dec 19, 2012	Unreleased	Oct 11, 2016		Unreleased			
Red Faction †	Volition	THQ Nordic	Unreleased	Apr 24, 2012	Mar 18, 2012	Unreleased	Dec 6, 2016	Nov 30, 2016	Unreleased			
Red Faction II †	Volition	THQ Nordic	Unreleased	May 15, 2012	Unreleased	Unreleased	Aug 29, 2017		Unreleased			
The Red Star		Sony Interactive Entertainment	Unreleased	Aug 6, 2013	Unreleased	Unreleased			Unreleased			
Resident Evil – Code: Veronica X	Capcom	Capcom	Jul 25, 2012	Unreleased	May 28, 2014	Unreleased	May 9, 2017	May 10, 2017	Unreleased			
Riding Star		Sony Interactive Entertainment	Unreleased	Jun 25, 2013	Unreleased	Unreleased			Unreleased			
Ring of Red		Konami	Unreleased	Oct 4, 2011	Unreleased	Unreleased			Unreleased			
Rise of the Kasai †	BottleRocket Entertainment	Sony Interactive Entertainment	Unreleased			Unreleased	Mar 8, 2016		Unreleased			
River King: A Wonderful Journey		Natsume Inc.	Unreleased	Sep 18, 2012	Unreleased	Unreleased			Unreleased			
Road Trip Adventure		System 3	Unreleased		Feb 15, 2012	Unreleased			Unreleased			
Robot Warlords		Midas Interactive Entertainment	Unreleased		Mar 27, 2013	Unreleased			Unreleased			
Rockman: Power Battle Fighters		Capcom	Jan 18, 2017	Unreleased		Unreleased			Unreleased			
Rogue Galaxy †	Level-5	Sony Interactive Entertainment	Aug 20, 2014	Unreleased		Unreleased	Dec 5, 2015		Unreleased			
Rollercoaster World		Midas Interactive Entertainment	Unreleased		Jan 30, 2013	Unreleased			Unreleased			
Romancing SaGa		Square Enix	Apr 15, 2015	Unreleased		Unreleased			Unreleased			
Room Zoom: Race for Impact		Hamster	Unreleased		Jul 4, 2012	Unreleased			Unreleased			
RPG Maker 3		Enterbrain	Unreleased	Apr 16, 2013	Unreleased	Unreleased			Unreleased			
Ruff Trigger: The Vanocore Conspiracy		Natsume Inc.	Unreleased	Oct 2, 2012	Dec 8, 2015	Unreleased			Unreleased			
Rygar: The Legendary Adventure		Koei Tecmo	Unreleased	Nov 6, 2012	Unreleased	Unreleased			Unreleased			
Sagashi ni Ikouyo		Sony Interactive Entertainment	Jan 21, 2015	Unreleased		Unreleased			Unreleased			
Samurai Shodown V	SNK	SNK	Apr 15, 2015	Unreleased		Unreleased			Unreleased			
Samurai Shodown VI	SNK	SNK	Nov 19, 2014	Unreleased		Unreleased	Nov 22, 2016	Nov 25, 2016	Unreleased			
Samurai Warriors 2		Koei Tecmo	Sep 19, 2012	Unreleased	Jan 30, 2013	Unreleased			Unreleased			
Samurai Warriors 2: Empires		Koei Tecmo	Unreleased		Jan 30, 2013	Unreleased			Unreleased			
SBK-07: Superbike World Championship		Milestone srl	Unreleased	Jul 10, 2012	Unreleased	Unreleased			Unreleased			
Secret Weapons Over Normandy		LucasArts	Unreleased		Apr 29, 2015	Unreleased			Unreleased			
The Seed: WarZone		Midas Interactive Entertainment	Unreleased		Feb 29, 2012	Unreleased			Unreleased			
Seek and Destroy		System 3	Unreleased		Feb 15, 2012	Unreleased			Unreleased			
Sega Ages 2500 Series Vol. 1: Phantasy Star Generation 1		Sega	Aug 20, 2014	Unreleased		Unreleased			Unreleased			
Sega Ages 2500 Series Vol. 6: Bonanza Bros.		Sega	Jul 17, 2013	Unreleased		Unreleased			Unreleased			
Sega Ages 2500 Series Vol. 9: Gain Ground		Sega	May 15, 2013	Unreleased		Unreleased			Unreleased			
Sega Ages 2500 Series Vol. 17: Phantasy Star Generation 2		Sega	Aug 20, 2014	Unreleased		Unreleased			Unreleased			
Sega Ages 2500 Series Vol. 18: Dragon Force		Sega	Jul 25, 2012	Unreleased		Unreleased			Unreleased			
Sega Ages 2500 Series Vol. 20: Space Harrier Complete Collection		Sega	Nov 21, 2012	Unreleased		Unreleased			Unreleased			
Sega Ages 2500 Series Vol. 23: SEGA Memorial Selection		Sega	Oct 17, 2012	Unreleased		Unreleased			Unreleased			
Sega Ages 2500 Series Vol. 25: Gunstar Heroes Treasure Box		Sega	Sep 19, 2012	Unreleased		Unreleased			Unreleased			
Sega Ages 2500 Series Vol. 26: Dynamite Deka		Sega	Aug 22, 2012	Unreleased		Unreleased			Unreleased			
Sega Ages 2500 Series Vol. 30: Galaxy Force II - Special Extended Edition		Sega	Jun 19, 2013	Unreleased		Unreleased			Unreleased			
Sega Ages 2500 Series Vol. 32: Phantasy Star Complete Collection		Sega	Dec 19, 2012	Unreleased		Unreleased			Unreleased			
Sega Ages 2500 Series Vol. 33: Fantasy Zone Complete Collection		Sega	Apr 16, 2014	Unreleased		Unreleased			Unreleased			
Sengoku Basara		Capcom	Jun 19, 2013	Unreleased		Unreleased			Unreleased			
Sengoku Basara 2		Capcom	Jul 17, 2013	Unreleased		Unreleased			Unreleased			
Sengoku Basara 2 Heroes		Capcom	Jul 17, 2013	Unreleased		Unreleased			Unreleased			
Shadow the Hedgehog		Sega	Jun 19, 2013	Unreleased		Unreleased			Unreleased			
Shellshock: Nam '67		Square Enix	Unreleased		Jun 6, 2012	Unreleased			Unreleased			
Shepherd's Crossing		Hamster	May 15, 2013	Unreleased		Unreleased			Unreleased			
Shin Megami Tensei: Digital Devil Saga		Atlus	Unreleased	May 20, 2014	Jun 4, 2014	Unreleased			Unreleased			
Shin Megami Tensei: Digital Devil Saga 2		Atlus	Unreleased	Jun 10, 2014	Jun 11, 2014	Unreleased			Unreleased			
Shin Megami Tensei: Nocturne		Atlus	Unreleased	May 6, 2014	May 20, 2015	Unreleased			Unreleased			
Shinobi		Sega	Unreleased	Aug 14, 2012	Mar 7, 2012	Unreleased			Unreleased			
Silent Hill 4: The Room		Konami	Oct 17, 2012	Unreleased		Unreleased			Unreleased			
Siren †	Project Siren	Sony Interactive Entertainment	Jul 25, 2012	Jan 15, 2013	Unreleased	Unreleased	Jun 14, 2016		Oct 15, 2024			
SkyGunner	PixelArts	Sony Interactive Entertainment	Unreleased			Unreleased	Sep 17, 2024		Sep 17, 2024			
Skyscraper		Midas Interactive Entertainment	Unreleased		Feb 15, 2012	Unreleased			Unreleased			
Sly Cooper and the Thievius Raccoonus †	Sucker Punch Productions	Sony Interactive Entertainment	Unreleased			Jun 11, 2024			Jun 11, 2024			
Sly 2: Band of Thieves †	Sucker Punch Productions	Sony Interactive Entertainment	Unreleased			Dec 10, 2024			Dec 10, 2024			
Sly 3: Honour Among Thieves †	Sucker Punch Productions	Sony Interactive Entertainment	Unreleased			Dec 10, 2024			Dec 10, 2024			
The Sniper 2		Midas Interactive Entertainment	Unreleased		Apr 25, 2012	Unreleased			Unreleased			
Snowboard Racer 2		Midas Interactive Entertainment	Unreleased		Feb 22, 2012	Unreleased			Unreleased			
Sonic Heroes		Sega	Sep 17, 2014	Unreleased	Feb 22, 2012	Unreleased			Unreleased			
Soukou Kihei Armodyne		Sony Interactive Entertainment	Dec 17, 2014	Unreleased		Unreleased			Unreleased			
Soul Nomad & the World Eaters		Nippon Ichi Software	Dec 17, 2014	Unreleased		Unreleased			Unreleased			
Soulcalibur III †	Project Soul	Bandai Namco Entertainment	Unreleased			Dec 16, 2025			Dec 16, 2025			
Space Fishermen		Sony Interactive Entertainment	Aug 21, 2013	Unreleased		Unreleased			Unreleased			
The SpongeBob SquarePants Movie		Activision	Unreleased	Feb 7, 2012	Unreleased	Unreleased			Unreleased			
SSX on Tour		Electronic Arts	Unreleased		Feb 15, 2012	Unreleased			Unreleased			
Star Ocean: Till the End of Time †	tri-Ace	Square Enix	Unreleased			Mar 31, 2017	May 23, 2017		Unreleased			
Star Wars: Bounty Hunter (Note: Originally released as part of the Star Wars Battlefront limited edition console bundle. Released separately on January 15, 2016.) †	LucasArts	Disney Interactive Studios	Unreleased	Apr 28, 2015	Oct 8, 2014	Jun 18, 2022	Nov 17, 2015	Nov 19, 2015	Unreleased			
Star Wars: The Clone Wars †	Pandemic Studios	Disney Interactive Studios	Unreleased			Jun 11, 2024			Jun 11, 2024			
Star Wars Episode III: Revenge of the Sith	The Collective	LucasArts	Unreleased	Apr 28, 2015	Feb 11, 2015	Unreleased			Unreleased			
Star Wars: Jedi Starfighter †	LucasArts	Disney Interactive Studios	Unreleased			Jun 18, 2022	Nov 17, 2015	Nov 19, 2015	Unreleased			
Star Wars: Racer Revenge †	Rainbow Studios	Disney Interactive Studios	Unreleased	Apr 28, 2015	Unreleased	Jun 18, 2022	Nov 17, 2015	Nov 19, 2015	Unreleased			
Star Wars: Starfighter†		LucasArts	Unreleased	Apr 28, 2015	May 6, 2015	Unreleased			Unreleased			
Steel Dragon EX		Midas Interactive Entertainment	Unreleased		Feb 22, 2012	Unreleased			Unreleased			
Stella Deus: The Gate of Eternity		Atlus	Unreleased	Sep 3, 2013	Unreleased	Unreleased			Unreleased			
Stock Car Crash		Midas Interactive Entertainment	Unreleased		Feb 29, 2012	Unreleased			Unreleased			
Strike Force Bowling		Play It!	Unreleased		Aug 22, 2012	Unreleased			Unreleased			
Stuntman: Ignition		Nordic Games	Unreleased	Nov 8, 2011	Apr 18, 2012	Unreleased			Unreleased			
Suikoden III	Konami Computer Entertainment Tokyo	Konami	Apr 15, 2015	Jun 23, 2015	Jun 23, 2015	Unreleased			Unreleased			
Suikoden IV	Konami Computer Entertainment Tokyo	Konami	Unreleased	Feb 28, 2017	Apr 13, 2017	Unreleased			Unreleased			
Sukusuku Inufuku		Hamster	Oct 17, 2012	Unreleased		Unreleased			Unreleased			
Summoner	Volition	THQ Nordic	Unreleased	Apr 15, 2015	Unreleased	Unreleased	Jul 16, 2024	Jul 16, 2024	Unreleased	Jul 16, 2024	Jul 16, 2024	
Super Fruit Fall		System 3	Unreleased		Jul 25, 2012	Unreleased			Unreleased			
Super Robot Taisen Z		Bandai Namco Entertainment	Feb 19, 2014	Unreleased		Unreleased			Unreleased			
Suzuki TT Superbikes Real Road Racing Championship		Sony Interactive Entertainment	Unreleased	Sep 4, 2012	Unreleased	Unreleased			Unreleased			
Syphon Filter: The Omega Strain		Sony Interactive Entertainment	Unreleased	May 22, 2012	Unreleased	Unreleased			Unreleased			
Tak: The Great Juju Challenge		Nordic Games	Unreleased		Mar 21, 2012	Unreleased			Unreleased			
Tak 2: The Staff of Dreams		Nordic Games	Unreleased	Nov 29, 2011	Unreleased	Unreleased			Unreleased			
Tantei Jingūji Saburō: Innocent Black		WorkJam	Dec 16, 2015	Unreleased		Unreleased			Unreleased			
Tantei Jingūji Saburō: Kind of Blue		WorkJam	Dec 16, 2015	Unreleased		Unreleased			Unreleased			
Tenshi no Present: Marl Ōkoku Monogatari		Nippon Ichi Software	Dec 17, 2014	Unreleased		Unreleased			Unreleased			
Tian Xing: Swords of Destiny		Rising Star Games	Unreleased		Feb 15, 2012	Unreleased			Unreleased			
TimeSplitters	Free Radical Design	Deep Silver	Unreleased			Aug 20, 2024			Aug 20, 2024			
TimeSplitters 2	Free Radical Design	Deep Silver	Unreleased			Aug 20, 2024			Aug 20, 2024			
TimeSplitters: Future Perfect	Free Radical Design	Deep Silver	Unreleased			Aug 20, 2024			Aug 20, 2024			
Tokobot Plus: Mysteries of the Karakuri		Koei Tecmo	Unreleased	Sep 24, 2013	Unreleased	Unreleased			Unreleased			
Tom Clancy's Ghost Recon		Ubisoft	Unreleased		May 30, 2012	Unreleased			Unreleased			
Tom Clancy's Ghost Recon Advanced Warfighter		Ubisoft	Unreleased		Mar 7, 2012	Unreleased			Unreleased			
Tomb Raider: Legend †	Crystal Dynamics	Crystal Dynamics	Unreleased			Jun 11, 2024			Jun 11, 2024			
Toy Story 3: The Video Game		Disney Interactive Studios	Unreleased		Jul 25, 2012	Unreleased			Unreleased			
Trapt		Koei Tecmo	Unreleased	Feb 4, 2014	Unreleased	Unreleased			Unreleased			
Treasure Planet		Disney Interactive Studios	Unreleased		Feb 13, 2013	Unreleased			Unreleased			
Trigger Man		Play It!	Unreleased		Aug 22, 2012	Unreleased			Unreleased			
Truck Racing 2		Midas Interactive Entertainment	Unreleased		Feb 22, 2012	Unreleased			Unreleased			
Twinkle Star Sprites: La Petite Princesse		SNK	Feb 18, 2015	Unreleased		Unreleased			Unreleased			
Twisted Metal: Black	Incognito Entertainment	Sony Interactive Entertainment	Unreleased	Feb 12, 2013	Sep 5, 2012	Unreleased	Dec 5, 2015		Unreleased			
Ultimate Board Game Collection		Sony Interactive Entertainment	Unreleased	Jun 4, 2013	Unreleased	Unreleased			Unreleased			
Ultimate Mind Games		Midas Interactive Entertainment	Unreleased		Feb 29, 2012	Unreleased			Unreleased			
Utawarerumono: Chiriyukusha e no Komoriuta		Leaf	May 20, 2015	Unreleased		Unreleased			Unreleased			
Video Poker & Blackjack		Play It!	Unreleased		Jul 25, 2012	Unreleased			Unreleased			
Virtua Fighter 4: Evolution		Sega	Unreleased		Feb 22, 2012	Unreleased			Unreleased			
WALL-E		Disney Interactive Studios	Unreleased	Sep 23, 2014	Unreleased	Feb 17, 2026			Feb 17, 2026			
War of the Monsters †	Incognito Entertainment	Sony Interactive Entertainment	Unreleased	Jul 31, 2012	Unreleased	Unreleased	Dec 5, 2015		Apr 15, 2025			
The Warriors	Rockstar Toronto	Rockstar Games	Unreleased	May 28, 2013	Mar 20, 2013	Unreleased	Jul 5, 2016		Unreleased			
Warriors Orochi		Koei Tecmo	Oct 17, 2012	Jul 2, 2013	Feb 27, 2013	Unreleased			Unreleased			
Warriors Orochi 2		Koei Tecmo	Unreleased		Mar 13, 2013	Unreleased			Unreleased			
Warship Gunner 2		Koei Tecmo	Unreleased	Jun 25, 2013	Unreleased	Unreleased			Unreleased			
Wild Arms 3 †	Media.Vision	Sony Interactive Entertainment	Unreleased			Unreleased	May 17, 2016		Unreleased			
Wild Arms 4 †	Media.Vision	Sony Interactive Entertainment	Unreleased			Apr 21, 2026			Apr 21, 2026			
Wild Arms 5	Media.Vision	Sony Interactive Entertainment	Oct 15, 2014	Unreleased		Unreleased			Unreleased			
WinBack: Covert Operations		Koei Tecmo	Unreleased	Oct 23, 2012	Unreleased	Unreleased			Unreleased			
Winnie the Pooh's Rumbly Tumbly Adventure		Disney Interactive Studios	Unreleased		Feb 13, 2013	Unreleased			Unreleased			
Winter Sports		Oxygen Games	Unreleased		Sep 19, 2012	Unreleased			Unreleased			
World Championship Poker		Oxygen Games	Unreleased		Feb 13, 2013	Unreleased			Unreleased			
World Championship Poker 2: Featuring Howard Lederer		Oxygen Games	Unreleased		Sep 19, 2012	Unreleased			Unreleased			
World Snooker Championship 2005		Sega	Unreleased		Jul 25, 2012	Unreleased			Unreleased			
WWI: Aces of the Sky		Midas Interactive Entertainment	Unreleased		Feb 15, 2012	Unreleased			Unreleased			
WWII: Battle Over The Pacific		Midas Interactive Entertainment	Unreleased		Feb 15, 2012	Unreleased			Unreleased			
WWII: Soldier		Midas Interactive Entertainment	Unreleased		Feb 29, 2012	Unreleased			Unreleased			
X-treme Express		Midas Interactive Entertainment	Unreleased		Sep 19, 2012	Unreleased			Unreleased			
Tomb Raider: Anniversary	Crystal Dynamics	Crystal Dynamics	Unreleased			Unreleased	Nov 18, 2025		Unreleased	Nov 18, 2025	Nov 26, 2025	
Blood Omen 2: Legacy of Kain	Crystal Dynamics	Crystal Dynamics	Unreleased			Unreleased	Nov 19, 2024		Unreleased	Nov 19, 2024		
Dropship: United Peace Force	SCEE Studio Camden	Sony Interactive Entertainment	Unreleased			Unreleased	Feb 18, 2025		Unreleased	Feb 18, 2025		
Battle Engine Aquila	Lost Toys	Ziggurat Interactive, Inc.	Unreleased			Unreleased	May 20, 2025		Unreleased	May 20, 2025		
Legacy of Kain: Defiance	Crystal Dynamics	Crystal Dynamics	Unreleased			Unreleased	Sep 16, 2025		Unreleased	Sep 16, 2025		

== See also ==
- Lists of downloadable PlayStation games
- List of PlayStation Store TurboGrafx-16 games
- List of downloadable PlayStation Portable games
- List of HD remasters for PlayStation consoles
- List of original Xbox titles for Xbox One and Series X/S
