= Sword of the Samurai (2002 video game) =

2002 video game

- Developer: Lightweight
- Publishers: JP: Genki; EU: Ubi Soft
- Platform: PlayStation 2
- Release: JP: June 27, 2002; EU: February 14, 2003
- Genre: Fighting
- Modes: Single-player, multiplayer

Sword of the Samurai, known in Japan as Kengo 2 (剣豪2), is a video game developed by Lightweight for the PlayStation 2. It was published by Genki in Japan in 2002, and by Ubi Soft in Europe in 2003. A North American version was announced by Ubi Soft but it was never released. Sword of the Samurai is the second game in the Kengo series and a sequel to Kengo: Master of Bushido from 2000. A sequel, Kengo 3, was released in 2004 exclusively in Japan. A fourth and final game in the series, Kengo Zero (AKA Kengo: Legend of the 9), was released in 2006.

== Gameplay ==
The main mode of the game is called "Bushido Quest". At the beginning, the player creates a samurai and joins a dojo. The player can increase their ability points and learn new combat techniques by training at the dojo or participating in tournaments. Side missions are available that may involve protecting VIPs, rescuing kidnapped people, or carrying out assassinations. After completing certain missions, there's an opportunity to fight a Kengo, a sword master, if beaten the player gains a new sword and learns new techniques. The ultimate objective of the game is considered either beating all 16 Kengos or winning in the shogun's tournament. Other modes available are "Time Attack" where the player has to fight multiple opponents at once, and "Versus" which has a two-player multiplayer option.

== Release ==
The game was announced by Crave Entertainment (publisher of the first Kengo in the West) on May 1, 2001, as Kengo: Legacy of the Blade for the Xbox. It was supposed to be released with the first batch of Xbox games. The Xbox version was cancelled in favor of Kabuki Warriors and development was moved to the PlayStation 2. Release was scheluded for spring 2002. An extended trailer was shown at the fall 2001 Tokyo Game Show. In early 2002, the Japanese release was scheluded for April 25, 2002 but the game was eventually released on June 27, 2002. In September 2002, a European release was announced for early 2003 and the game was renamed to Sword of the Samurai.

The game was released in Japan on The Best budget range on July 10, 2003, and on PlayStation Network on October 15, 2014, as a PS2 Classic for the PlayStation 3.

== Reception ==
Reception

Review scores
Publication	Score
4Players	78%
Consoles +	83%
Famitsu	30/40
Gamekult	5/10
Hyper	80%
Jeuxvideo.com	15/20
Play	80%
M! Games	80%
Next Level	7.7/10
PlayStation 2 Official Magazine – Australia	7/10
PlayStation 2 Official Magazine – UK	6/10
PlayStation World (AUS)	9/10
Power Unlimited	70%
Strana Igr	6.0/10

The game received favorable previews from IGN and Play, GameSpy and PlayStation 2 Official Magazine – Australia were more critical.

Consoles + compared the game to Bushido Blade and liked the atmosphere, graphics and the combat system but called the game progression boring. Power Unlimited called it a fun game that is a bit slow. The create a samurai feature was noted as the best part of the game. Play summarized: "Intelligent fighter that improves as the fight prolongs". PlayStation 2 Official Magazine – Australia said the game has expanded the gameplay from the previous game but the combat is sluggish and the game suffers from a severe lack of polish. PlayStation 2 Official Magazine – UK said the sword fighting can be "enthralling and intense" but occasionally frustrating. The overall presentation was described as "generally dire". Hyper wrote: "[...] players with an abiding interest in the subject matter will discover that it's a truly captivating and rewarding experience." PlayStation World noted it as "the best Samurai duelling sim you're likely to find." In a retrospective review, M! Games described the controls as complex but intuitive and fights as breathtaking after learning the combat system. The presentation was noted as dreary.

== Sequel ==
Kengo 3 (剣豪3) was released for the PlayStation 2 on September 22, 2004. It was developed by Lightweight and published by Genki. It was released only in Japan. Featuring much improved graphics and a simplified fighting system from Kengo 2. Aggregate review website GameStats assigned Kengo 3 an average score of 7.9 out of 10 based on three magazine reviews. Kengo 3 was the last game in the series developed by Lightweight. Kengo Zero (2006) was developed by Genki.

The game was released in Japan on The Best budget range on November 3, 2005, and on PlayStation Network on November 18, 2015, as a PS2 Classic for the PlayStation 3.
