= Bushido Blade =

Bushido Blade may refer to:

- Bushido Blade (video game), a 1997 3D fighting game developed by Light Weight
  - Bushido Blade 2, a 1998 video game, the sequel to Bushido Blade
- The Bushido Blade, a 1981 British-American film about a stolen samurai sword
