= Kengo Zero =

2006 video game

- North American cover art, same art was used in Europe
- Developer: Genki
- Publishers: JP: Genki; EU/NA: Majesco
- Platform: Xbox 360
- Release: JP: September 7, 2006; NA: September 11, 2007; EU: November 16, 2007; AU: November 29, 2007
- Genres: Fighting, hack and slash
- Modes: Single-player, multiplayer

Kengo Zero (剣豪ZERO), known in North America as Kengo: Legend of the 9, is a video game developed and published by Genki for the Xbox 360 in 2006. It was published by Majesco in North America and Europe in 2007. It is the fourth and last game in the Kengo series. It is the first game in the series not developed by Lightweight.

== Gameplay ==
In the game's "Main Mode", there are nine playable characters to choose from, all are famous samurai or swordsmen with their own storyline: Sanako Chiba, Yasubi Horibe, Ittosai Ito, Musashi Miyamoto, Izo Okada, Soji Okita, Ryoma Sakamoto, Kojiro Sasaki, and Jubei Yagyu. The mode has the player hack and slash against multiple opponents at once from a behind-the-back camera view. At the end of the level, one of the eight characters that were not chosen appear as a boss. Between levels, the player can level up by putting points into different abilities and learning new combat techniques. "Mission Mode" uses the same maps from "Main Mode" and gives them different objectives that must completed within a time limit. "Combat Mode" is a one-on-one mode which includes two-player multiplayer option. In the "Xbox Live Nationwide Contest" mode, the players can pit artificial intelligence (AI) opponents against each other. The player's AI character has to be loaded from the "Main Mode's" save data.

== Release ==
The Japanese release was announced in June 2006 to be released on September 7, 2006. The Western release was announced on May 30, 2007 for autumn that year. The game was shown at E3 2007 trade event. The game was released in North America on September 11, 2007. European release was scheduled for October 2007 but was eventually released in November 2007. Australian release was also in November 2007.

== Reception ==
Reception

Aggregate score
Aggregator	Score
Metacritic	38/100

Review scores
Publication	Score
4Players	28%
Game Informer	2/10
GameSpot	3/10
GameSpy	2/5
GamesRadar+	1.5/5
GameTrailers	4.8/10
GameZone	3.5/10
IGN	3.5/10
576 Konzol	3/10
MAN!AC	62%
Official Xbox Magazine (ES)	4.0/10
Official Xbox Magazine (US)	3.5/10
Vandal	5/10

Kengo Zero was panned by critics. The game received "unfavorable" reviews according to video game review aggregator Metacritic. GameSpot called the game "a proof-of-concept demo". They noted the missions as "monotonous", the combat as "shallow", and the AI as "dimwitted". GameSpy said how the online play is handled is the game's biggest disappointment. IGN called it "a boring and repetitive gameplay experience." GameTrailers said the gameplay is frustrating and graphics uninteresting. GameZone wrote: "[...] the game's potential is held back by the game's crippling controls, awful camera and lackluster game modes."
