= Ring of Red =

2000 video game

- North American cover art
- Developer: Konami
- Publisher: Konami
- Director: Masahiro Hinami
- Producer: Yutaka Haruki
- Designer: Keiichi Matate
- Programmer: Yasushi Fujisawa
- Artists: Miyuki Sekimizu; Ayumu Nishino
- Platform: PlayStation 2
- Release: JP: September 21, 2000; NA: March 14, 2001; EU: June 15, 2001
- Genre: Turn-based tactics
- Mode: Single player

Ring of Red (リング・オブ・レッド, Ringu obu Reddo) is an alternate history turn-based strategy video game released by Konami for the PlayStation 2 console. It was one of the first PlayStation 2 games made with CD-ROM-based technology. Ring of Red was released in 2000 for Japan followed by North America and Europe in 2001. An emulated version for the PlayStation 3 was released as a PS2 Classic on October 4, 2011 in North America.

The game is based on an alternate history theory that after the defeat of Nazi Germany and Fascist Italy near the end of World War II, Japan was conquered and occupied by both Soviet and American forces - rather than solely by the US, as in actual history. The occupation created two countries, consisting of the north governed by a pro-communist government and the south by a pro-democracy government with Hokkaidō occupied by Soviet forces. Tensions between the two Japans were at an all-time high during the Cold War with a Japanese War (similar in cause to the actual Korean War) taking place with Armored Fighting Walkers, giant walking mechas being used with great success by both the North and South Japanese militaries.

== Gameplay ==
Combat is split between a turn-based battlefield for moving units, and a real-time mode for combat. The latter includes the AFWs moving through their attack patterns and support troops that have their own abilities.

=== Tactical map ===
The tactical map uses a square grid.

In each mission, players deploy their units on a map. Each square contains terrain that provide movement and defense bonuses or penalties. Both sides consist of units made up of a single AFW and three squads of infantry. The player and the enemy take turns in moving their units around the map in order to complete certain objectives, such as pursuing a unit, capturing a town or protecting a convoy. Some missions have branching objectives that give different bonuses.

Players can engage in combat by moving within distance of an enemy unit, depending on the range the AFW is in prior to combat. If players are successful in destroying the enemy AFW, the enemy unit is removed from the map and players gain experience points. If the enemy destroys a player AFW, the entire unit is removed until the next mission.

In addition to combat, players can capture cities, which can provide more troops for recruitment and heal friendly troops, and can dedicate turns to repairing their units. Each mission has parameters which result in player defeat, such as not completing the mission within the time limit or losing Weizegger's AFW.

Ring of Red features a day/night cycle. Each move takes a certain amount of time, which influences how often units can be issued orders, which in turn affects what time of day combat takes place. In addition, there is simulated weather and natural disasters.

=== Combat ===
When engaging enemies, a 1st Person view of the scope's reticule appears in order to facilitate attacks. In this case, Ryoko's AFW is on target as a mock enemy during Mission 2 with Yu Kaiho's Aim Weapon Maximum Attack.

Combat takes place in a real-time environment. Players begin with their AFW standing in opposition to the enemy AFW. If either AFW is destroyed, combat ends and the unit is removed from the strategic map. If neither AFW is destroyed within the prescribed time limit, the battle ends in a draw. Units can also end combat by escaping from the battlefield or by engaging in close combat, which automatically ends the match.

Combat consists of players moving and operating their AFW and issuing orders to accompanying infantry. AFWs must wait until their main weapon is loaded before they can attack, either against the enemy AFW itself or its infantry support. When aiming, players are given a first-person view from the AFW along with a hit probability percentage. The more time spent aiming, the more accurate the shot becomes and the more damage is done. Base accuracy is dependent on range, battle conditions, and type of AFW, although the rate of increase of accuracy slows down as it increases.

Conditions on the strategic map strongly influence the battle conditions. Battles fought at night receive a penalty in base accuracy. Different types of terrain grant different bonuses and penalties to base accuracy. Furthermore, various terrains can also block attacks randomly, such as trees in forests.

Certain support troops can compensate for terrain conditions by deploying range-finders before the battle starts, and Afws, in tandem with squadrons stationed on the mech itself, can launch flares to provide Battlefield illumination.

Players also have access to Maximum Attacks, which are unique abilities that can only be used a certain number of times in each mission. Maximum Attacks vary between pilots, but include techniques such as powerful shots, unaimed snap-shots, dodging, instant movement and instant loading. Some crews also provide special shells which can provide illumination or do devastating damage against AFWs or infantry.

=== Infantry ===
Three infantry squads accompany the AFW in each unit, two fighting on the ground and the third riding on the mech itself as crew. Some squad types, such as the Mechanic or Medic, provide bonuses to healing units between turns, while Recon units allow the AFW to start combat at the optimum distance for the range the engagement begins at.

During the combat turn, squads fight automatically, aiming at either the soldiers in the enemy unit or the enemy AFW, depending on their designation (Anti-Infantry or Anti-AFW). Each squad has a different ability that is used in the Vanguard (deployed in front of the mech) or Rearguard (deployed behind it). These can range from special attacks against the enemy AFW or infantry, fixing damaged portions of their own machine, or defending against attacks.

== Plot ==
An anti-AFW at the rear while German troops march in the countryside. The said AFW was placed on actual World War II combat footage by CGI with black and white rendering to give it an authentic feeling of the footage being taken in the late 1930s and 1940s.

=== Setting ===
Ring of Red is set in an alternate history 1960s where the Allies ended World War II by invading Japan in the costly Operation Downfall rather than the use of the atomic bomb. With the Cold War looming over the horizon, Hokkaidō is ceded to the Soviet Union, and the remaining portions Japan are partitioned into Communist Republic of North Japan and capitalist South Japan. North Japan was supported by the Soviet Union and the People's Republic of China, while the United States and other capitalist countries supported the South, and Germany makes engineering contributions to both sides.

In 1950, like the Korean War, the Japan War took place when communist-backed North Japan invaded the south. The north and the south fought for three years in which South Japan, with the help of its Western Allies, repelled the invasion but neither side was able to gain the upper hand. The war finally ended in 1953 in a stalemate mainly dictated to both Japans by both super powers.

A significant development in this timeline is the design and deployment of mecha called Armoured Fighting Walkers (AFWs). They were used with negligible effect in the European theatre of war after Hitler ordered their deployment at the Battle of Kursk, however they proved more effective in the rugged terrain of Japan and other countries. The establishment of a no fly zone over Japan under the RACINI Treaty - based on the presumption that nuclear weapons could only be delivered by airplane - has furthered AFW development. However, this treaty does not prevent the use of nuclear weapons by AFWs or ballistic missiles should one of the sides decide to develop such weapons.

When the Type 3 prototype AFW is stolen by elite Northern agent and Vietnam veteran Yu Kaiho under the orders of the North Japanese general Hidetomi Minakawa, Masami "Wei" von Weizegger and Ryoko Minakawa were sent to retrieve the prototype for South Japan at all costs. In their quest to retrieve it, they will learn there are bigger ambitions at play than tipping the balance of the Cold War, and even their own allies may not be trusted.

==== Plot differences ====
In the Japanese version, it is stated that Wei and Ryoko's commanding officers Schreingen and Rodriguez are former members of the Nazi Party but evaded punishment in return for information regarding AFWs and allowed to stay in South Japan. There are no references to this in the EU and US versions. The Japanese version also mentions the atomic bombings of Hiroshima and Nagasaki being followed up by Operation Downfall.

== Media ==
A 257-page novel of the game was released by Makoto Takeuchi, which expands on the game's story and characters.

== Reception ==
Reception

Aggregate score
Aggregator	Score
Metacritic	82/100

Review scores
Publication	Score
AllGame	3.5/5
Edge	8/10
Electronic Gaming Monthly	6.17/10 (Note: In Electronic Gaming Monthly's review of the game, one critic gave it 5.5/10, and the rest gave it each a score of 6.5/10.)
EP Daily	8/10
Eurogamer	7/10
Game Informer	9/10
GameRevolution	B−
GameSpot	7.9/10
GameSpy	87%
IGN	8.5/10
Next Generation	3/5
Official U.S. PlayStation Magazine	4/5
RPGFan	(A.K.) 90% (A.D.) 67%
X-Play	3/5

The game received "favorable" reviews according to the review aggregation website Metacritic.

GameSpot said the game "is easily the best strategy game out on the PS2 at this time." IGN criticized the dialogue and the overall translation, but praised the game as "a very satisfying strategy experience." GameRevolution criticized the pace of the gameplay and the graphics, while praising its simplicity and depth. Eurogamer criticized the soundtrack, lack of voice acting and translation, but praised the graphics and gameplay, saying "People who enjoy involving battle strategy romps...will definitely find Ring of Red captivating." GamePro called it "repetitive and sometimes even boring...yet it manages to be hypnotically fun." (Note: GamePro gave the game 4/5 for graphics, and three 3.5/5 scores for sound, control, and fun factor.) Greg Orlando of NextGen said, "With this Ring, we certainly are wed to mass destruction – yet we marry not out of love, but for looks and quick, easy fun."

However, the game was criticized for having many errors in its localization, such as misspelling, factual errors and incoherent dialogue. Ring of Red was also faulted for not having any voice acting.
