= Ruff Trigger: The Vanocore Conspiracy =

2006 video game

- Developer: Playstos Entertainment
- Publishers: NA: Natsume Inc.; PAL: Zoo Digital Publishing
- Platform: PlayStation 2
- Release: NA: June 27, 2006; PAL: August 25, 2006
- Genres: Action, platform
- Mode: Single-player

Ruff Trigger: The Vanocore Conspiracy is a 2006 action-platform video game developed by Playstos Entertainment and published by Natsume Inc. in North America and by Zoo Digital Publishing in PAL regions for the PlayStation 2. The game was released in North America on June 27, 2006, and in Europe on August 25, 2006. It was later released as a "PS2 Classic" port in North America on October 2, 2012.

== Gameplay ==
The player takes on the role of Ruff Trigger (voiced by David Gasman), an anthropomorphic canine bounty hunter sent to rescue tiny creatures known as "piglots" who crashed on a foreign planet. Later, it is revealed that the piglots were created to infiltrate peoples' homes under the guise of being pets before transforming and attacking them.

The player can use different weapons to battle enemies, which are unlocked throughout the game. A key mechanic involves rescuing and transporting piglots, which unlocks minigames.

In the second level, Ruff becomes a werewolf after ingesting a substance that was used to transform the piglots. In this form, he has increased speed and strength, but cannot use weapons.

Ruff Trigger has several bosses, namely Armageddon, the scientist who created the piglots. Some bosses cannot be damaged normally and must be defeated using piglots.

== Development and release ==
Ruff Trigger: The Vanocore Conspiracy was announced in July 2002. It was released in North America on June 27, 2006, by Natsume Inc.. In PAL territories it was published by Zoo Digital Publishing on August 25. It was later released on the PlayStation Network as a "PS2 Classic" port in North America on October 2, 2012.

== Reception ==
Reception

Aggregate score
Aggregator	Score
Metacritic	57/100

Review scores
Publication	Score
Electronic Gaming Monthly	4.67/10
GameSpot	6.2/10
GameZone	6/10

Ruff Trigger received "mixed" reviews according to the review aggregation website Metacritic. It was criticized for copying the gameplay of Ratchet & Clank.
