= Eco Creatures: Save the Forest =

2007 video game

- North American cover art
- Developers: LightWeight; Headlock Corporation
- Publishers: JP: Interchannel; NA: Majesco; EU: Rising Star Games
- Director: Masakazu Tagawa
- Platform: Nintendo DS
- Release: JP: August 23, 2007; NA: March 4, 2008; EU: June 13, 2008
- Genre: Real-time strategy
- Modes: Single-player, multiplayer

Eco Creatures: Save the Forest, known as Ecolis (エコリス, Ekorisu) in Japan and as Ecolis: Save the Forest in Europe, is a real-time strategy video game for the Nintendo DS video game console. It was co-developed by LightWeight and Headlock Corporation and was released in Japan on August 23, 2007 by Interchannel; the game saw the release in 2008, for North America on March 4 by Majesco, and in Europe on June 13 by Rising Star Games. Eco Creatures is sponsored by the World Wide Fund for Nature.

== Synopsis ==
The residents of the Mana Woods had lived in peace and harmony for many years when the nearby Kingdom starts destroying the woods to expand the Kingdom. Dorian, the hero of the game, with the help of his mentor and the forest spirits, the Ecomon, Ecolis, and Ecoby, sets out to stop the pollution and save the forest.

== Gameplay ==
Eco Creatures uses the stylus to control three types of small rodents; a Squirrel called Ecolis, a Flying squirrel called Ecomon, and a Beaver called Ecoby. All of their characteristics depend on their colour, which is similar to Nintendo's own Pikmin series.

Eco Creatures supported Nintendo Wi-Fi Connection before that service was discontinued in 2014. There was also a level creation mode, with support for online connectivity. It has been stated that Dorian is able to either summon a spirit, or transform into one.

== Development and release ==
Eco Creatures: Save the Forest was co-developed by LightWeight and Headlock Corporation. The game was conceived in the summer of 2006, while its main development lasted from January to August 2007. According to Gui Karyo of North American publisher Majesco, the game was created to promote "public awareness of man's effect on the natural environment and the life within it" and to "impart environmental consciousness on the younger generation". Project director Masakazu Tagawa stated that one of Lightweight's graphic designers came up with the concept of the game: "A squirrel is capable of storing seeds in its cheeks but they are not very good at remembering where they buried them afterwards. So as generations pass the forgotten seeds that the squirrels buried will turn into the next generation of trees".

Ecolis was officially released in Japan by Interchannel on August 27, 2007. A portion of the game's sales were donated to Japan's branch of the World Wide Fund for Nature. Shortly after its debut, Majesco picked the game up for North American distribution under the title Eco Creatures: Save the Forest and released it on March 4, 2008. Rising Star Games followed suit the following April by promising a European publication; the game was released in the region as Ecolis: Save the Forest on June 13.

== Reception ==
Eco Creatures: Save the Forest was met with a mostly mediocre critical reception. The game holds aggregate scores of 58.75% on GameRankings and 55 out of 100 on Metacritic. Famitsu rated the game 29 out of 40.

== Sequel ==
A sequel titled Ecolis: Aoi Umi to Ugoku Shima (エコリス ～青い海と動く島～; "Ecolis: The Moving Island and Blue Sea") was released in Japan by GungHo Works on May 28, 2009.
