= Naval Ops: Warship Gunner =

2003 video game

- Developer: Microcabin
- Publisher: Koei
- Platform: PlayStation 2
- Release: JP: April 3, 2003; NA: June 24, 2003; EU: October 17, 2003
- Genre: Vehicle simulation game
- Mode: Single player

Naval Ops: Warship Gunner, released in Japan as Kurogane no Houkou 2: Warship Gunner (鋼鉄の咆哮2 ウォーシップガンナー) is a 2003 vehicle simulation game developed for the PlayStation 2. It is an entry in the larger Kurogane no Houkou series, which also includes the games Naval Ops: Commander and Naval Ops: Warship Gunner 2.

The game is a one-player simulation of naval combat, in which the player commands an individual ship. In the opening cutscene, a World War II-era destroyer is caught in a dimension-warping vortex and transported to a parallel universe where the technology level is the same (although science-fiction weapons such as rail guns are available), but the world is at war between two main factions, the Empire and the Freedom Forces. The first mission of the game revolves around navigating a destroyer to safety while being bombarded by unidentified ships. Upon rendezvous with friendly forces, later identified as the Freedom Forces, the crew decides to join them in the war against the Empire.

== Gameplay ==
Gameplay of Naval Ops: Warship Gunner.

The player can choose between four nationalities: American, British, Japanese, and German. The choice of nationality affects the available ship types and characteristics of the ship parts which become available to the player throughout the game. The player can also choose to play the Normal mode or the World War II mode. In the World War II mode, technologies available will be mostly consistent with what was available to World War II-era warships. In the Normal mode, more advanced technology is available, including science fiction weapons like lasers and wave guns.

At the beginning of the game, the player is given command of a generic destroyer. As missions are completed, the player earns points and money. The points go toward crew promotions, while the money can be used to purchase ship parts from boat hulls to weapons, armor, and equipment. The money earned can also be used to develop technology in five areas: aircraft, weapons, metallurgy, engines, and electronics. The higher level of money invested in each category makes available more advanced designs.

There are five main categories of ships in this game, along letter-pair identifiers: destroyer (DD), cruiser (CL for Light/CA for Heavy), battleship (BB), aircraft carrier (CV), and battlecarrier (BC). With enough money, players can purchase a pre-built design or design their own. Pre-built vehicles also may feature parts that cannot be found in the game, so players may purchase pre-built vehicles and then scrap them for parts.

The game progresses through 40 missions through 4 theaters of 10 missions each. The first theater is set around the Mediterranean Sea and the Atlantic Ocean. The second theater is in the Pacific Ocean, the third is in the Indian Ocean, while the fourth is worldwide. Toward the end of each of these theaters is a "boss" level, in which players must sink a "supership".

== Development ==
Naval Ops: Warship Gunner was developed by Micro Cabin and published by Koei. It was the first game in the Kurogane no Houkou series to be released outside of Japan. The game had the working title of Warship Gunner before being renamed to Naval Ops: Warship Gunner. It was released in the United States in June 2004 with a European release later that year.

== Reception ==
Reception

Aggregate score
Aggregator	Score
GameRankings	67%

Review scores
Publication	Score
GameSpot	6.8/10
GameSpy	74/100
IGN	7.7/10
PlayStation Official Magazine – Australia	5/10
Official U.S. PlayStation Magazine	3/5
PlayStation: The Official Magazine	8/10
X-Play	2/5

Naval Ops: Warship Gunner received mixed reception from video game critics.

== Sequel and spin-off ==
A direct sequel Naval Ops: Warship Gunner 2 was released in March 2006.
