= Go! Sports Skydiving =

2008 video game

Sky Diving
- Developer(s): Lightweight (Note: Additional work by Japan Studio.)
- Publisher(s): Sony Computer Entertainment
- Platform(s): PlayStation 3
- Release: JP: January 10, 2008; WW: February 7, 2008
- Genre(s): Sports
- Mode(s): Single-player, multiplayer

Sky Diving (also known as Go! Sports Skydiving) is a 2008 sports video game developed by Lightweight and published by Sony Computer Entertainment for the PlayStation 3. It was released only on PlayStation Network.

== Gameplay ==
Sky Diving relies on the DualShock 3's Sixaxis motion controls. The player free falls by tilting the controller, with additional stunts also using motion sensing. There are two main modes; Formation and Landing. Formation has the player and a team of three other skydivers (either other players online or computer controlled) perform different stunt setups. In Landing, the player must make a perfect landing on a designated target. A third mode, Extreme, is unlocked when the player earns the S license for the Landing mode. There, the player is tasked with collecting money while free falling. The game features a global ranking system for the Formation and Landing modes. Replays can be downloaded through the leaderboards for players to watch.

== Reception ==
Reception

Aggregate score
Aggregator	Score
Metacritic	42/100

Review scores
Publication	Score
Eurogamer	3/10
IGN	3/10
PlayStation Official Magazine – UK	4/10
PSM3	59%

The game received "unfavorable" reviews according to the review aggregation website Metacritic. Lack of content and the motion controls being over-sensitive were common points of criticism for the game. GamePro said of the game, "Throw in some very uneven game presentation - nice graphics, poor instruction manual and plug-your-ears-annoying soundtrack - and gamers are presented with a title that not even the in-game appearance of Wesley Snipes could make appealing." (Note: GamePro gave the game 3.5/5 for graphics, 2.5/5 for sound, and two 2/5 scores for control and fun factor.)
