= Naval Ops: Commander =

2002 video game

Kurogane no Houkou 2: Warship Commander
- Developer: Microcabin
- Publisher: Koei
- Platforms: Windows, PlayStation 2
- Release: Windows: JP: 2002; PS2: JP: January 22, 2004; NA: March 10, 2004; EU: June 11, 2004
- Genre: Vehicle simulation game
- Mode: Single player

Kurogane no Houkou 2: Warship Commander (鋼鉄の咆哮2 ウォーシップコマンダー) is a 2002 vehicle simulation game computer game for Microsoft Windows. It was ported to the PlayStation 2 in 2004; this port was localized and titled Naval Ops: Commander.

It is part of the larger Kurogane no Houkou series, sequel to the Windows and PlayStation 2 game Kurogane no Houkou: Warship Commander. It is related to Naval Ops: Warship Gunner and Naval Ops: Warship Gunner 2.

In 2004, this game received a direct sequel in the form of Kurogane no Houkou 3: Warship Commander, only released in Japan and only for Windows.

== Overview ==
The game is a one-player simulation of naval combat, in which the player commands an individual ship. In the opening cutscene, a World War II-era destroyer similar to its predecessor, Naval Ops: Warship Gunner. The game uses the same type of warships and most technologies allotted in Warship Gunner.

The game differs from both Warship Gunner games, by having look-down view of playing instead of third-person view. You are also allotted escort/support vessels to assist you in missions. You can also re-arrange these escorts to different formations to allow better use of their abilities. The games still allows the customization of your "flagship" or "command ship" as in Warship Gunner(s) games.

Weapon systems are the same, but you'll note that power and effectiveness of these weapons will differ from other Warship Gunner games. You may find them not as powerful, or as effective in some cases.

Story wise, in first Warship Gunner, the player's ship is one drawn from another world. Namely World War II of Earth. In Commander, the roles are reversed, the player is now the native of the alternated world. The player witnessing people and technology coming from another world. However, not necessary from our Earth.

There are many hulls available to the player including drillships and double hull ships. However some hulls can only be used by getting a certain score on a certain level such as getting a drillship for beating the "Arahabaki2". Only type real naval vessel is not available to the player is the submarine. Naval Ops: Warship Gunner 2, the other sequel to Naval Ops: Warship Gunner, allows use of player controlled submarines.

== Game Play ==
The player starts with simple Destroyer and small task force of Destroyer Escorts. After the first introduction mission, the player chooses what missions they do. They also choose which faction in which they wish part of. (German, Japanese, British, & American) Choosing faction will allow player access that faction designs (& styles) vessels they were known for in World War II era up to the early 21st century in some cases.

The player earns money for various tasks done during a mission beyond achieving the mission objectives. Going above and beyond the mission requirements gains more money and higher grade for the mission.

The missions are graded from E (Eliminated), C-B (Low Grade), A (Successful), S - (Superior). S Grade is achieved only when 3 different criteria are sufficiently fulfilled. These are: "hit points" at the end of the mission (regardless of damage sustained earlier in the mission; only the end total counts), total percentage of targets destroyed (including aircraft and land installations), and percentage of objectives completed, both primary and secondary. A & S grades are rewarded by Mission Command (or Allies) with special equipment sometimes only achievable through grading or extremely high technology (see below).

The missions are no# 1-10 per level and levels labeled alphabetically (A B C etc.). As each level is succeeded, the challenges of each mission will increase. Demanding the player to invest the money they make in technology for new aircraft, equipment, weapons, metallurgy, and electronics.

The player may choose revisit missions to get more points, salvage free equipment, improving mission grade, or get more experience for himself and his escort vessels. The experience will allow the player ship and escort ships perform better in missions. However, as player choose different escort ships for missions, they will find new ship do not gain the previous escort mission's experience.

Players can access the shipyard function of the game immediately after they start their game. The Shipyard function allows one to customized a design or build from components earned, developed/research or components found. The player must balance the components being put into various size of ship they are assembling. Each ship/hull has weight and number components they can handle. The player designs can be made so they far superior to normal game designs.

- Survival Mode

Outside the normal campaign game a player have option of playing bonus game known as Survival. The player chooses one of their saved game and chooses one of the ships they designed and select their escort vessel they wish accommodate it.

This is test of survival for player's ship to get through all the completed states of the player's saved game. The player plays can only play through the levels they have completed in their saved games. Example: if level "A" is completed, Level "B" isn't. Survival will end at level "A".

With completion of each Level, a reward is given to the player. These rewards range from exotic equipment, escort vessels, components not accessible from regular game. Example: Level A has the "Shark" escort Submarine as reward for its completion.

== Player Ships ==
The heart of Naval Ops is ship customization. Your ships abilities limited to the type of ship you initially purchase.

-Destroyer -Cruiser -Aircraft Carrier (or Carrier) -Battlecarrier (Hybrid of Battleship & Carrier's abilities) -Battleship

Each type of ship has particular scope of missions it can only perform that some of the others cannot. Example: Battleships/Battlecarriers/Carriers are not allowed to carry most anti-submarine weaponry.

As technology in metallurgy increases more hulls will become available. Increase in tonnage (size) will allow more equipment and flexibility.

Special Ship hulls maybe acquired through particular missions or in certain levels of Survival Game play. Some of the special hulls made available are.

-Drill Ship -Double-Hull Destroyer (Easily acquired in higher mission levels) -Double-Hull Cruiser (Hard to acquire) -Double-Hull Battleship (Difficult to acquire)

== Escort Ships ==
The escort ships bring a new dimension to the game. The player is provided with the option of a small task force of 3 ships. The player/commander can choose which type for they'll to assist them in missions that player is assigned. As technology is researched, more escort vessels and new capacities become available. Also, mission completion of A or S also sometimes rewards escort ship of various types.

The escort ships have wide range of abilities. From basic destroyers to speciality vessels.

Examples are: Electro Magnetic Shield ships, Fuel Tanker ships, Ammunition ships and more. These are available through tech upgrades/achievements and winning "A" or "S" grades per mission. However, the escorts have limited AI. Which can be problematic when they are following the player command ship.

They can be useful for providing fire support when mission requires you to use vessel that may not have defensive or offensive weapons necessary to combat all missions threats. Task Force Example: If using an Aircraft Carrier or Battleship as command ship, your escorts from light destroyer to cruiser can provide anti-submarine support.

Another type of escort are Submarines escorts. These are rare escorts, they extremely effective against other submarines, but they have limited firing arch. They are ideal escorts in missions which are highly prone to sinking the escorts (negative score to player totals) since they are difficult to sink.

The escorts can be arrange in various formations to protect your command ship from being damaged or provide wide range of scanning or even increasing your task forces defensive ranges.

If however, any escort ships are destroyed during the mission, this will be scored against the player when mission tallied and ranked.

Also once completing survival mode (such as for "A Stage"), the prizes are rewarded with their successful completion. These rewards not available though normal use of the game itself, but the survival mode. An Example prize: "A Stage" reward is a unique escort submarine becomes available to the player in regular game. It is called the Shark, this is a silly version of escort submarine. This will appears to the player only as a Shark's fin and its only weapons are 61 cm Torpedoes.
