= X-treme Express =

2001 racing video game

- Developer: Syscom Entertainment
- Publisher: Midas Interactive Entertainment
- Engine: RenderWare
- Platform: PlayStation 2
- Release: JP: February 21, 2001; EU: March 18, 2002
- Genre: Trains
- Modes: Single-player, Multiplayer GameSpot 6.6

This video game related article is a stub. You can help wikipedia by expanding it.

X-treme Express (known in Japan titled Tetsu 1: Densha de Battle! (Tetsu 1: Densha de Battle!, Tetsu Wan: Densha de Battoru!)) is a video game released for the PlayStation 2 on 21 February 2001 in Japan and on 18 March 2002 in Great Britain. It has also been released in Australia. It was developed by Syscom Entertainment and published by Midas Interactive Entertainment.

The game is about racing trains, which vary from North America, Europe and other parts of the world. The goal in Grand prix mode is to get to the finish line first, although on each track you race to the end and then in reverse in two different races. The other modes are Tour, in which you complete a number of tests and scenarios to unlock more trains; Free mode, where you can choose what track you race on and the time of day the race is on; and VS mode, where you can play against other players. The difficulty setting can be changed to suit the player's skill level and on the easiest mode the train will never derail when going around curves. On the harder modes, if the player does not slow down and move the centre of gravity meter to counteract the G-forces of the curves, the train will derail. There are over 80 trains in the game, some of which are themed, and 10 tracks to race on.
