= Robot Warlords =

2000 video game

- European box art
- Developer(s): Nexus Interact
- Publisher(s): JP: Dazz; EU: Midas Interactive Entertainment
- Platform(s): PlayStation 2
- Release: JP: August 10, 2000; EU: December 14, 2001
- Genre(s): Turn-based tactics
- Mode(s): Single-player

Robot Warlords, known as Velvet File (Note: Japanese: ヴェルベットファイル) in Japan, is a turn-based tactical game created by Nexus Interact. It was first released in Japan in 2000 under the title Velvet File The storyline features mecha fighting in a war against a terrorist organisation; the player can have a team of up to six characters, though only four can be used in a battle. The mecha themselves are state of the art technology that run on batteries, and can be customised with a variety of melee and ranged weapons, allowing for different strategies. The game received a Japan-only re-release, Velvet File Plus (Note: Japanese: ヴェルベットファイル Plus), which fixed several bugs and added support for the Sony PS2 PrintFan with PopEgg.
