= Kengo: Master of Bushido =

2000 video game

- Developer: Lightweight
- Publishers: JP: Genki; NA: Crave Entertainment; EU: Crave/Ubi Soft
- Series: Kengo
- Platform: PlayStation 2
- Release: JP: December 14, 2000; NA: January 2, 2001; EU: March 30, 2001
- Genre: Fighting
- Modes: Single-player, Multiplayer

Kengo: Master of Bushido is a fighting game and the first entry in the Kengo series. Developed by Lightweight, it was released for the PlayStation 2 as Kengo (剣豪) in Japan on December 14, 2000, and as Kengo: Master of Bushido in North America and Europe in 2001 respectively. A sequel, Sword of the Samurai (Kengo 2 in Japan), was released in 2002.

The game was released in Japan on PlayStation Network on April 16, 2014, as a PS2 Classic for the PlayStation 3.

== Gameplay ==
The single-player game consists of three sections. Of these, the first two sections are for training and for challenging other schools. The training consists of multiple mini-games which each focus on one gameplay aspect, such as timing or button combos. The training helps increase the maximum value for the character statistics, without augmenting their current value. When challenging other schools the player will fight four identical-looking opponents, one unique opponent, and the master of that school. The battles are fought using wooden swords but increase in difficulty consecutively, and the player recovers a small portion of health between battles.

The player will need to defeat each rival school to earn a place at the head of their school. The player randomly has access to the Imperial Tournament, which serves as the final goal for the game. Players fight in the tournament using steel swords and have full health at the start of each match. The player can challenge other schools with victory meaning that they have earned the sword of that school. The player gets a unique special move by arming with different swords. By this point the player will be challenged randomly either by the master or unique opponent from other schools and will not be able to decline. Losing random encounters strips the sword of that school from the character. Both the life and Ki bars are able to be hidden from battle, and a wounded character has their status displayed during battle.

Offense uses four "stances" as well as one special move. This special move is not always available if the wrong sword is equipped. These special moves are executed by pressing the triangle button when the player has a full Ki bar. The player can fill the Ki bar by pressing the triangle button or by fighting successfully. Each of these "stances" is selected using the shoulder buttons and is made up of three moves. These moves must be executed in sequence and each can be augmented by the proximity of the characters to one another, by using the analog stick, by or pressing another button while executing the combo. When not in battle, the player can re-design the four stances by replacing one move or all three moves with other moves that the player has earned during the game.

== Reception ==
Kengo: Master of Bushido

Aggregate score
Aggregator	Score
Metacritic	62/100

Review scores
Publication	Score
Edge	6/10
Electronic Gaming Monthly	5.83/10 (Note: Three critics of Electronic Gaming Monthly gave the game each a score of 5.5/10, 5/10, and 7/10.)
Famitsu	31/40
Game Informer	7.25/10
GameRevolution	C−
GameSpot	5.9/10
GameSpy	52%
IGN	6/10
Next Generation	4/5
Official U.S. PlayStation Magazine	3/5

The game received "mixed" reviews according to video game review aggregator Metacritic. Chester "Chet" Barber of NextGen said, "With a deep fighting engine and great replay value, you'll be playing this one for weeks. If you loved Bushido Blade, Kengo is definitely a must-buy." In Japan, Famitsu gave it a score of 31 out of 40. Four-Eyed Dragon of GamePro said, "Although Kengo may not be suited for button-mashers or die-hard Capcom fighter enthusiasts, its unique fighting style is a fresh and welcome addition to the genre." (Note: GamePro gave the game 5/5 for graphics, two 4/5 scores for sound and control, and 4.5/5 for fun factor.)
