= Kabuki Warriors =

2001 video game

- Developers: Genki, Lightweight
- Publishers: JP: Genki; NA: Crave Entertainment
- Composer: Takayuki Nakamura
- Platform: Xbox
- Release: NA: November 20, 2001; JP: February 28, 2002
- Genre: Fighting
- Modes: Single-player, multiplayer

Kabuki Warriors (斬 歌舞伎, Zan Kabuki) is a 2001 fighting game developed by Genki and Lightweight for the Xbox. It was published by Crave Entertainment in North America and Genki in Japan. One of the Xbox's earliest exclusive titles, the game received negative reviews.

== Gameplay ==
The game features a kabuki theater theme, where players control kabuki actors battling on stage. It features a single attack button and a "performance meter" that tracks how well players are engaging the crowd (earning more money in Tour Mode).

The core gameplay is Tour Mode, where players travel across Japan with their troupe, battling in 3v3 matches to earn money (for faster travel). Winners can trade warriors to strengthen their team.

== Reception ==
Reception

Aggregate score
Aggregator	Score
Metacritic	32/100

Review scores
Publication	Score
AllGame	1.5/5
Edge	1/10
Electronic Gaming Monthly	2.5/10
Famitsu	20/40
Game Informer	0.5/10
GamePro	3.5/5
GameSpot	1.4/10
GameSpy	40%
IGN	2/10
Next Generation	1/5
Official Xbox Magazine (US)	5.9/10
TeamXbox	3.3/10

The game received "unfavorable" reviews according to video game review aggregator Metacritic. It is considered one of the worst video games of all time. Complaints were directed towards a lack of variety between characters and environments, dreadful graphics, a very limited move set, and only utilizing one button for attacks. GameSpot gave it the distinction of being named "Worst Game of 2001".

Edge, giving the game its first one-out-of-ten rating in the publication's history, said that the game is not kabuki, but a Yie Ar Kung-Fu with blusher. Andy McNamara of Game Informer heavily panned the gameplay, difficulty, graphics, and AI, noting that the opponents were easy to beat, a sentiment in which NextGen also agreed. In Japan, Famitsu gave it a score of 20 out of 40.
