= Bushido Blade 2 =

1998 video game

- North American box art
- Developer: Lightweight
- Publishers: JP: Square; NA: Square Electronic Arts
- Director: Kunihiko Nakata
- Producer: Tetsuhisa Tsuruzono
- Composer: Ryuji Sasai
- Platform: PlayStation
- Release: JP: March 12, 1998; NA: October 29, 1998
- Genre: Fighting
- Modes: Single-player, multiplayer

Bushido Blade 2 (Note: Japanese: ブシドーブレード弐, Hepburn: Bushidō Burēdo Tsu) is a 1998 fighting video game developed by Lightweight and published by Square for the PlayStation. It is the sequel to Bushido Blade, which had been released the previous year. The game was re-released in 2008 for PlayStation Network. The game is similar to the first, except the story and characters expand and relate on two rival clans/gangs/schools; The Narukagami (which mainly features characters from the first game), and the Shainto, in which both clans seek a different journey, while still in opposition of each other and their mission.

== Gameplay ==
Bushido Blade 2 expands on some of the aspects of Bushido Blade, while limiting or removing others. The story mode is changed from one large connected level to a series of skirmishes, each set on a different map. Dual sword attacks have been added. Playable characters are chosen from groups which represent two opposing schools of assassins, the Shainto and Narukagami, and are armed with swords or polearms of varying types. In addition to the chosen character, the player encounters support characters during each game. Completing a stage while playing as a support character unlocks that support character for play in all modes.

The fights in Bushido Blade 2 mark the progress of the chosen character who—depending on the character—either fights to regain a legendary sword, or to destroy the opposing school. Levels involve a pattern of fighting several generic ninja followed by a boss, who is one of the playable characters from the opposing school.

Two characters in Bushido Blade 2 are exceptions to the typical opponent roster: the gun-wielding Tsubame and Katze. They have sworn loyalty to opposing schools, and battles involving them provide a different kind of challenge. The player can defend against the firearms with melee weapons.

Most of the weapons are straight from the first game, excluding the yari and the M16. The yugiri (a sword which is quite similar to the nodachi but wielded like the katana), which was used by the original Bushido Blade's final boss Hanzaki is now a selectable weapon, but is only accessible in the final battle versus the unarmed "last member of the Kagami clan". Some of the original Bushido Blade's selectable weapons—rapier (which does not appear as a selectable weapon, but only in Highwayman's two-sword stance when he has the long sword equipped), sledgehammer and ninjato—as well as the boss-specific "Double-Bladed Sword-Staff" and "Special Sabre", have been eliminated. The weapons usable by both schools (such as the katana) have a slightly different design for each school. While each character wields a specific weapon when fought as a boss, when played as, they can wield whichever weapon the player chooses. The yari is exclusive to characters from the Shainto school, and the naginata is exclusive to characters from the Narukagami school.

== Plot ==
In the 13th century, on the island of Konoshima (in the Seto Naikai, Inland Sea of Japan) there existed two feudal clans, the Kagami and the Sue, both aligned to the same Daimyō. They lived in peace until war on mainland Japan crushed the Daimyō. The Kagami swore fealty to the new Daimyō while the Sue were loyal to their master until the end. The conflict between the two began with the Kagami drawing the Sue off of the island and into battle. The Sue, having been defeated in battle, then lost their sacred sword the Yugiri. For centuries after, secretive battles were fought that were fierce, but not widespread.

Some 800 years later, the Shainto school, composed of the remaining descendants from the Sue clan, attacked the Narukagami Shintoryu, the Kagami clan dojo, at their headquarters, the Meikyokan. To redeem their honor, they move to recover the Sacred Sword Yugiri and wipe out the last descendant of the Kagami family. That is the point from which the opening FMV begins, covering the assault which is later seen more fully in the story mode.

== Characters ==
Most of the playable characters from the first game have returned, including Red Shadow, Mikado, Kannuki, Tatsumi, Utsusemi, and Black Lotus (now known as Highwayman). With the exception of Highwayman, they all still belong to the Narukagami clan. While Kannuki, Mikado, and Tatsumi are in the starting roster and featured in the opening FMV along with Kaun, Gengoro, and Jo of the Shainto, Red Shadow, Utsusemi, and Highwayman are not and need to be unlocked. A few NPCs from the first game have returned as playables, namely Sazanka, Tsubame, Katze, and Hongou.

The game also features an uncommon fighter unlocking system. During the Story Mode, each of the playable characters will face two "bonus battles," when a player is temporarily given a new character to control for one stage. If that character dies in a level, then the main character jumps in to finish it, and the story continues progressing normally. However, if the player manages to complete a level with a new character and then completes his or her story, then he or she will be unlocked in the character roster. As in the first Bushido Blade, all of the main characters have two outfits—one for the story mode, and one for the other play modes, while unlockable fighters use a single costume for the entire game. Additionally, a gunman or gunwoman (Katze and Tsubame from Bushido Blade) and a secret "clown character" for each clan are unlockable by satisfying certain requirements.

Narukagami characters:

- Kannuki – A starting character who returns from the first Bushido Blade game. His support characters are Matsumushi and Red Shadow. One of the strongest characters in the game, he is proficient with heavy weapons, although he can wield the lighter ones with no difficulty, as well. He starts in high stance with every weapon. As all strong characters, his running overhead swing is faster. He can also throw an enemy with any weapon equipped (some characters have throws dependent on a weapon) and uses a yellow iron fan, which has only mediocre range and damage (but is highly noticeable on the ground) as a throwing sidearm. Other than that, has no unique attacks.
- Mikado – A starting character who also returns from Bushido Blade. Her supports are Sazanka and Suminagashi. She is proficient with the naginata, and she can perform a grab on an enemy if equipped with it. Throws two knives. She's a lightweight, so she has trouble with heavy weapons (naginata aside), but is balanced between speed and strength when using the lighter ones. Can use special dash attacks when equipped with light swords or polearms. The only character to have unique moves (aside from throws) with the naginata poleaxe.
- Tatsumi Takeshina – A starting character. The purple-eyed boy, now a little bit matured from the first game. In story mode, he is supported by Nightstalker and Utsusemi. Uses daishō. His kodachi sidearm can also be thrown, dealing lethal damage and allowing fast run-up attacks. Has unique attacks with any sword in the game, including the sword-dances for the katana and the nodachi, with the nodachi one being unique to him. Physically fast, but lacks in strength.
- Utsusemi – Unlockable character. Old man in brown kimono. He returns from the original Bushido Blade, slightly aged. His support character is Tatsumi. He is very proficient with Japanese swords—the katana and the nodachi. His strength allows for a good performance with broadsword as well. Similar to Tatsumi, but can use the hundred stabs move in daishō stance, and throws with the other ones. Also, his sword-dance with the nodachi is the same as with Katana, compared to Tatsumi's unique one.
- Red Shadow – An unlockable character. A female ninja from the first Bushido Blade, who appears to be a student of Utsusemi. She is from Russia, and remains the only fair-haired female in the game. Her support characters are Kannuki and Nightstalker. Very quick and agile. Runs faster than most characters and has an improved running attack. Can dual-wield with the long sword, with second arm being kodachi. As in other cases, it remains a one-hit-kill throwable sidearm with a fast follow-up strike. Proficient with European weapons like the long sword and broadsword, having unique leg swipes using both. Can perform a throw on the opponent when equipped with long sword, as well as extra dash attacks, similarly to Mikado equipped with a katana.
- Matsumushi – An unlockable character. Man in purple kimono with pipe. Proficiencies are mostly the same as with Utsusemi, but cannot perform a throw on the opponent, nor can he do a "million stabs" maneuver. Instead, Matsumushi is faster. His support characters are Suminagashi and Kannuki.
- Suminagashi – An unlockable character. Tall and Bald. Throws small bombs. Very slow, yet strong. Can throw enemy with any weapon, aside from the katana. Suminagashi, being an American, speaks broken Japanese in the original Japanese release of the game. In the western release of the game, despite Suminagashi still retaining his broken Japanese according to the script, the meaning was lost due to all of the characters having been dubbed into English. His support characters are Matsumushi and Mikado.
- Nightstalker – An unlockable character. A male ninja, he is notable for being very fast both for running and striking, as well as having the biggest sidearms count. Throws shurikens. Proficient with lighter weapons, such as the katana and the long sword. His support characters are Tatsumi and Red Shadow.
- Sazanka – An unlockable character. Similar to a kabuki actor, he made his debut in the first Bushido Blade as a sub-boss. Proficient with a naginata. Throws knives. His support character is Mikado.
- Hokkyokku Tsubame – A special character in a bikini who wields an M-16 rifle. Fires faster when standing. Also appeared as a sub-boss in the first game, where she used a sword. She is unlockable only if the player completes the game's special Slash Mode in under fifteen minutes with any Narukagami character.
- "Clown" – A special character. This is the "clown character" for the Narukagami clan. He is unlockable only if the player completes the game's special Slash Mode with any Narukagami character without dying.

Shainto characters:

- Gengoro Narazu – A starting character. Gengoro is a Japanese ninja master. He is supported by Isohachi and Chihiro. This man is strong (albeit not as much as Kannuki), making him better with heavy weapons, but he is also proficient with the katana and has both the backup sheathe maneuver (which he can also do with a nodachi) and the separate sheathed stance. His sidearms are knives, and he can perform a grab with katana, nodachi, or yari equipped. He lacks speed.
- Kaun Narazu – A starting character. A young white-haired effeminate posh Japanese man, who is Gengoro's son. He is supported by Highwayman and Utamaru. He is most proficient with the yari, and can choke-grab opponents with it. One of the two characters to have unique strikes with it. His sidearm is a double-edged knife, which can be thrown, following a fast follow-up strike which can be very lethal. As a Shainto parallel to Mikado, Kaun is proficient with light swords, possessing above-average power and decent speed.
- Jo Kotomura – A starting character. A young Japanese American, brunette short-haired girl. Jo's family owns a popular and successful fish market. Her support characters are Tony Umeda and Takeru Hongou. She is proficient in acrobatics (around which most of her unique strikes circuit) and the use of light weapons, mainly the long sword. Can back up-sheathe both the katana and the sword. Her sidearm is a Jutte with a fast follow-up attack after the throw. Very fast and agile with small trade-off in power. Very lightweight.
- Chihiro – An unlockable character. Chihiro is a tomboy, and although female, she is mistaken as male several times. The young heir of the Shainto. She has a pet frog instead of a sub-weapon that can temporarily scare other female characters (with the exception of Tsubame), as well as, interestingly, Hongou. This leaves them vulnerable to be immediately struck afterwards. If left on floor, the frog will wander around the stage until it is either picked up or hops off the stage. Her support character is Gengoro. Despite being a female character, Tatsumi continually refers to Chihiro as "brother" in the American version. Other characters also mistakenly refer to her using masculine pronouns rather than feminine ones, likely as a reference to her rather tomboyish nature.
- Isohachi – An unlockable character. Isohachi is an elderly navy pilot/soldier. Has a special "yell" attack, which stuns his enemies and causes them to drop their weapons, instead of a sub-weapon, but he can still pick up and throw their weapons. If overused (which is essentially three or more times), he will cough instead, making him vulnerable for a moment. He can throw enemies with the long sword, broadsword, or yari, but has unique strikes with the nodachi. Isohachi's uniform mimics that of the Imperial Army of Japan, which makes Isohachi a war veteran of World War II. His support characters are Hongou and Gengoro.
- Utamaru – An unlockable character. Utamaru is a Japanese punk rocker. He uses the long sword in the sheathed stance, the fastest stance in the game. He can also throw with the lightest sword, making him most effective with long sword. His support character is Kaun. He seems to have a one-sided rivalry with Kaun, despite them both being on the same side, and as such will often compare himself to him and express annoyance whenever he ends up "outdoing" him.
- Hongou – An unlockable character. Hongou is a bare-chested mixed martial arts fighter, with tattoos on his arm. Uses a throwing axe, which kills enemies in one hit, as a sub-weapon. He is very strong and can throw opponents with any weapon. Appeared in the original game as a hidden enemy. His support characters are Isohachi and Jo.
- Tony Umeda – An unlockable character. Tony is an African-American/Japanese flamboyant man, with an afro. Tony is a fan of disco music and dancing. Tony's sidearm weapon is a Katana. Tony is also proficient with longsword and nodachi. Tony's relation to the Shainto gang is very convoluted and not really explained, although he seems to have some prior close relationship with his support characters, Jo and Highwayman.
- Black Lotus/Highwayman – An unlockable character. Although he now goes by Highwayman in this game, he is actually Black Lotus from the original Bushido Blade/first game, who has changed his identity after his betrayal of the Narukagami in the first game. Has a rapier as a sidearm, which can be thrown lethally and can be used in conjunction with the long sword. Aside, can do a backup maneuver with it and a million strikes combo. Also has some unique strikes with a yari and a broadsword. His support characters are Kaun and Tony Umeda.
- Schuvaltz Katze – A special character. A blonde Cowboy, who wields a revolver. Fires faster when crouching. Was also a secret character in the first game, as well as an important character in story mode. He is unlockable only if the player completes the game's special Slash Mode in under fifteen minutes with any Shainto character.
- "Clown" – A special character. This is the "clown character" for the Shainto clan. He is unlockable only if the player completes the game's special Slash Mode with any Shainto character without dying.

== Reception ==
Reception

Aggregate score
Aggregator	Score
GameRankings	77%

Review scores
Publication	Score
AllGame	3/5
CNET Gamecenter	8/10
Edge	8/10
Electronic Gaming Monthly	6.875/10 (Note: In Electronic Gaming Monthly's review of the game, one critic gave it 7.5/10, another gave it 8/10, and the rest gave it each a score of 6/10.)
EP Daily	8/10
Famitsu	29/40
Game Informer	7.5/10
GameRevolution	B+
GameSpot	7.9/10
IGN	7/10
Next Generation	5/5
Official U.S. PlayStation Magazine	3.5/5
Dengeki PlayStation	60/100, 60/100, 75/100, 70/100

The game received favorable reviews according to the review aggregation website GameRankings. In Japan, Famitsu gave it a score of 29 out of 40.

Next Generation said in the July 1998 issue that the Japanese import "isn't an easy game to classify. As a sequel, it may alienate fans of Bushido Blade 1 who were anxious for more of the same. But nonetheless, kudos to Square for trying such a different approach to begin with, and for refining it in such a fearless manner. Excellent." Six issues later, the magazine said, "The bottom line is that this is one of the few times we've seen a sequel match its predecessor in originality. This game belongs on every serious PlayStation fan's shelf." GamePro said, "If you follow the path of Bushido, you're compelled to master Bushido Blade 2. If you're a rookie warrior, you'll have to learn patience and be prepared to die more than once before learning this game's secrets." (Note: GamePro gave the game all 4/5 scores for graphics, sound, control, and fun factor.)

In Japan, the game was the top-selling PlayStation game the week of its release as well as the week after. During the week of April 3, 1998, the game was the third-best-selling game including games from other consoles. In North America, Bushido Blade 2 was the ninth-best-selling game during the week of November 13, 1998.

The game was named as a finalist by the Academy of Interactive Arts & Sciences for "Console Fighting Game of the Year" during the 2nd Annual Interactive Achievement Awards.
