= Naval Ops: Warship Gunner 2 =

2006 video game

- Developer: Koei
- Publisher: Koei
- Platforms: PlayStation 2, PlayStation Portable
- Release: JP: February 23, 2006; NA: March 22, 2006; Warship Gunner 2: Koutetsu no Houkou (Koei the Best): JP: January 11, 2007
- Genre: Vehicle simulation game
- Mode: Single player

Naval Ops: Warship Gunner 2, released in Japan as Warship Gunner 2: Kurogane no Houkou (ウォーシップガンナー2 鋼鉄の咆哮) is a 2006 vehicle simulation game that was released for the PlayStation 2. Warship Gunner 2 is the direct sequel to Naval Ops: Warship Gunner from Koei that debuted in 2003, a subseries alongside the Warship Commander subseries within the overall Kurogane no Houkou series.

In 2009, it was ported to the PlayStation Portable as Warship Gunner 2 Portable (ウォーシップガンナー2 ポータブル), released only in Japan.

== Story ==
The game is set in 1939 of an alternate universe, and thus combines technology of this period in the real world with a variety of futuristic lasers and weapons, without the "World War II-only" mode of the first game. However, the first playthrough is generally consistent with the historical World War II, while subsequent playthroughs feature more lasers and high-tech weapons, as well as a slightly extended ending.

The story follows three or four officers of a Wilkia Freedom Forces naval crew as they lead the resistance to the coup that overthrew their King, then declared an Empire led by Admiral Karl Weisenberger and started making war, in a manner akin to real-life Nazi Germany. Over time, the superweapons take further prominence as more is learned about their nature, although their origins are left ambiguous. Wilkia is portrayed as a Dutch colony that developed into a second "overseas homeland" with a separate ruling king and independent military. In effect the game consists of a group of Evil Dutchmen trying to conquer the world with advanced technology.

Although the same general story applies in all cases, there are three story paths with different missions, story, and endings. The specific story path is chosen by the player's actions in the first four (Tsukuba path) or five (Braun path) missions of the story.

There are 6 difficulty settings and to complete the game you must go through all 6 levels 3 times. Complete the 6 levels with Tsukuba, then all 6 levels with Braun, then all 6 levels with Werner. There are a lot of hidden objects (secret bases) that are almost impossible to find without the help and guidance of a walkthrough.

== Reception ==
Naval Ops: Warship Gunner 2 on PlayStation 2 received "mixed" reviews according to review aggregator Metacritic.
