= Bushido Blade (video game) =

1997 video game

- North American cover art
- Developer: Lightweight
- Publishers: JP: Square; WW: Sony Computer Entertainment
- Director: Kunihiko Nakata
- Producer: Tetsuhisa Tsuruzono
- Composers: Shinji Hosoe; Ayako Saso; Takayuki Aihara
- Platform: PlayStation
- Release: JP: March 14, 1997; NA: October 16, 1997; PAL: February 1, 1998
- Genre: Fighting
- Modes: Single-player, multiplayer

Bushido Blade (Note: Japanese: ブシドーブレード, Hepburn: Bushidō Burēdo) is a fighting video game developed by Lightweight and published by Square for the PlayStation. The game features one-on-one armed combat. Its name refers to the Japanese warrior code of honor, bushidō.

Upon its release, the realistic fighting engine in Bushido Blade was seen as innovative, particularly the game's unique Body Damage System. A direct sequel, Bushido Blade 2, was released on the PlayStation a year later. Another game with a related title and gameplay, Kengo: Master of Bushido, was also developed by Lightweight for the PlayStation 2.

== Gameplay ==
Utsusemi striking Red Shadow with his sword, with visible blood, in Bushido Blade

The bulk of the gameplay in Bushido Blade revolves around one-on-one third-person battles between two opponents. Unlike most fighting games, however, no time limit or health gauge is present during combat. Most hits will cause instant death, while traditional fighting games require many hits to deplete an opponent's health gauge. It is possible to wound an opponent without killing them. With the game's "Body Damage System," opponents are able to physically disable each other in increments with hits from an equipped weapon, slowing their attacking and running speed, disabling their secondary weapon arm (rendering two-handed attacks and throwing weapons or dirt impossible), or crippling their legs and thus forcing them to crawl.

The game features eight weapons to choose from in many of its modes: katana, nodachi, long sword, saber, broadsword, naginata, rapier, and sledgehammer. Except the European weapons, which are noticeably shorter than historical counterparts, each weapon has a realistic weight and length, giving each one fixed power, speed, and an ability to block. A variety of attack combinations can be executed by the player using button sequences with the game's "Motion Shift System," where one swing of a weapon is followed through with another. Many of these attacks are only available in one of three stances, switched using the shoulder buttons or axis controls depending on controller layout: high, neutral, and low. The player also has a choice of six playable characters. Similar to the weapons, each one has a different level of strength and speed, and a number of unique special attacks. Some characters have a subweapon that can be thrown as well. All the characters have differing levels of proficiency with the selectable weapons and have a single preferred weapon.

Characters in Bushido Blade also have the ability to run, jump, and climb within the 3D environments. Because battles are not limited to small arenas, the player is encouraged to freely explore during battle. The castle compound which most of the game takes place in acts as a large hub area of interconnected smaller areas including a cherry blossom grove, a moat, and a bridge labyrinth. Some areas, such as the bamboo thicket, allow some interaction.

The story mode of Bushido Blade adds another gameplay mechanic: the Bushido code. Certain moves and tactics are considered dishonorable, such as striking a foe in the back, throwing dust in their eyes, or attacking while they bow at the start of fights. Acting dishonorably will abruptly end the player's playthrough after a certain point in the story, displaying a message berating them on their behavior.

In addition to the game's single player story mode, Bushido Blade contains a two-player versus mode and a link mode that supports the PlayStation Link Cable. Other single player options include a practice mode and a first person mode. Slash mode pits the player's katana-wielding character against a long string of 100 enemies, one after the other.

== Plot ==
Despite characters, themes and weapons similar to samurai cinema set in Feudal Japan, Bushido Blade takes place during the modern era (this is shown, for example, when the player reaches a helicopter landing pad phase set in a large city).

A fictional 500-year-old dojo known as Meikyokan lies within this region, and teaches the disciplines of the master Narukagami Shinto. A society of assassins known as Kage ("Shadow") also resides within the dojo. Once led by the honorable swordsman Utsusemi, he lost his position to Hanzaki, another skilled member of the dojo, in a fierce battle. Hanzaki gained respect as the Kage leader, until he discovered a cursed sword known as Yugiri. He began to change, disregarding the group's honor and the traditions held by its students.

One day, a Kage member escapes the confines of the dojo with its secrets. Several other members of the society, under penalty of death, are sent to dispatch the defector, only catching up to him (or her) within the ruins of the surrounding Yin and Yang Labyrinth Castle. In single player mode the players take on the role of the escaped assassin (independent of whatever character they choose), fighting their way out by killing their comrades one by one. Elements of the game story differ with each character selected.

== Development ==
Bushido Blade was the first title developed by Lightweight, a partially owned subsidiary of the game's publisher Square at the time of its release. The project was directed by Shuhiko Nakata, who wished to add tension to the traditional fighting game formula by having the possibility of a one-hit kill. However, Nakata stated that hit detection was implemented for the torso, head, and limbs to make the game more of a "swordsmanship simulator" rather than a fighting game. The director explained that the bushidō code of honor present in the game was not strictly the warrior's "way of dying" like that found in the Edo period's famous Hagakure guide but emphasized the concept of one's own survival as found in teachings of earlier Japanese time periods.

The musical score for Bushido Blade was created by Namco and Arika composer Shinji Hosoe with contributions by Ayako Saso and Takayuki Aihara. Much of the audio utilizes the flute and violin, as well as a traditional Japanese instrument, the shamisen. The music was released with the soundtrack for Square's Driving Emotion Type-S, also composed by the trio, on a two-disc set in 2001. The Bushido Blade disc contains 23 tracks. Unlike many other Square soundtracks of the era which were released by DigiCube, the music, copyrighted by Hosoe, was published by his own Super Sweep Records company. Bushido Blade also uses voice acting from voice actors such as Chikao Ōtsuka, Makio Inoue, and Hidekatsu Shibata.

=== Release ===
Originally slated for a February 1997 release in Japan, Bushido Blade was pushed back to March to make room for the debut of Square's Aques line of sports games in February. Bushido Blade was presold in convenience stores in Japan prior to its release, similar to Square's decision to presell its hit Final Fantasy VII in Lawson stores.

The North American release of Bushido Blade had one minor graphical change: blood was added, replacing the yellow flash that appears during a fatal blow. Despite the North American-exclusive inclusion of graphic violence, the ESRB rated the game Teen, while the ELSPA gave the European release a more restrictive 18+ rating.

== Reception ==
Reception

Aggregate scores
Aggregator	Score
GameRankings	81%
Metacritic	83/100

Review scores
Publication	Score
Computer and Video Games	2.5 of 5
Edge	6 of 10
Electronic Gaming Monthly	7.375/10
Famitsu	31/40
Game Informer	8.5 of 10
GameRevolution	B+
GameSpot	8.9 of 10
Hyper	84%
IGN	8.7 of 10
Next Generation	5/5
Official U.S. PlayStation Magazine	4/5
PlayStation: The Official Magazine	8 of 10
Dengeki PlayStation	60/100, 65/100, 85/100, 65/100

In Japan, Bushido Blade was the 25th best selling game of 1997 in Japan, selling nearly 387,937 copies. The game was later reprinted, along with a handful of other Square Enix titles, under the developer's "Legendary Hits" label. The game was also added to the PSone Classics roster on the Japanese PlayStation Store in 2008. In the United States, the game sold 324,083 units as of January 2003, adding up to 712,020 units sold in Japan and the United States as of January 2003.

Bushido Blade was critically well received, primarily for the innovation of its combat system. The one-hit kills drew the most commentary, with GameSpot calling them "Bushido Blade's most exciting and preposterous feature, destined to earn it just as many fans as detractors". In an example of this, three of Electronic Gaming Monthly's four reviewers gave the game a 7 out of 10 or lower, contending that the appeal of its innovation quickly wears off and that the one-hit kills can make victory or defeat arbitrary when unskilled players are involved, while the fourth reviewer, Crispin Boyer, gave it a 9 out of 10, applauding how the one-hit kills create a dynamic where "survival depends on your level of concentration rather than how well you've memorized long strings of button taps. You must watch your opponents, read their posture and predict how they'll strike."

GamePro found the realism of the fighting system in general to be a love-or-hate point, arguing, "[that] you must learn restraint and discipline in order to win ... is a concept that will not go over well with the Tekken and Street Fighter generation who just want a butt-kickin' good time." However, most reviewers soundly approved of the fighting system. IGN said it was "extremely innovative, yet still not so ambitious as to have lost the point." GameSpot similarly opined, "Bushido Blade is a bold undertaking, but a remarkably successful one." Next Generation stated that "Given that Square has chosen to take a much more realistic approach to blade combat than most fighters, it could be argued that Bushido Blade is the kind of game you either love or hate. However, while it may not offer the same arcade-style button mashing or twenty hit combos of other 3D brawlers, it does offer the closest you can get to the real thing without actually getting cut."

Other subjects of praise for the game were the detailed graphics, continuous arenas, ability to disable opponents' limbs, and the way the amount of honor the player shows in combat affects the ending. However, some reviewers complained that trees and other objects sometimes obscure the player's view of the action.

In 1999, Bushido Blade received a nomination for "Console Fighting Game of the Year" during the AIAS' inaugural Interactive Achievement Awards. In November 2000, Bushido Blade was voted by the readers of Weekly Famitsu magazine as number 85 in its top 100 PlayStation games of all time. In 2006, the game was ranked number 190 on 1UP.com's list of The Greatest 200 Videogames of Their Time. In 2010, GamesRadar included Bushido Blade on the list of the seven "'90s games that need HD remakes".
