= Lightweight (company) =

Video game development company

Lightweight Co., Ltd
- Type: Private
- Industry: Video games
- Founded: November 22, 1995
- Headquarters: Ebisu, Shibuya
- Key people: Hideo Ooishi (president)
- Products: Bushido Blade series Kengo series
- Parent: Bergsala Holding (2012–2017)
- Website: www.lightweight.tokyo

Lightweight Co., Ltd (株式会社ライトウェイト), formerly Bergsala Lightweight (バーグサラ・ライトウェイト) is a developer and publisher of video games. While the company developed innovative fighting games with samurai themes, such as the Bushido Blade series and the Kengo series, it is known for its Hello Kitty games.

== History ==
The company was founded on November 22, 1995, in Meguroku, Tokyo under managing director Tetsuo Mizuno. The developer Square Co., Ltd. initially had a 40% stake in Lightweight. Lightweight cut its ties with Square in 1998, and in March 1999, Naotaka Ueda was appointed as CEO and director of the company. The following month, developer Genki acquired a 40% stake in the company. In March 2001 Lightweight became a wholly owned subsidiary of Genki, but dissolved this connection on March 31, 2006, when Lightweight was bought by Index Visual & Games, Ltd. Ueda retired in his position in November 2008.

The company was renamed Bergsala Lightweight after it was acquired by Bergsala Holding. On November 3, 2017, the company was sold and promptly renamed Lightweight.

On July 21, 2023, video game developer M2 announced that it purchased the rights of all NEC Avenue and NEC Interchannel games published on TurboGrafx-16 owned by Lightweight, including CD titles. Lightweight had started the process of transferring the rights of those games to M2 on March 31, 2023.

== Games ==
- Bushido Blade (1997) PlayStation
- Bushido Blade 2 (1998) PlayStation
- Kengo: Master of Bushido (2000) PlayStation 2
- Kabuki Warriors (2001) Xbox
- Sword of the Samurai (Kengo 2) (2002) PlayStation 2
- Crouching Tiger, Hidden Dragon (2003) PlayStation 2
- Kengo 3 (2004) PlayStation 2
- Hissatsu Urakagyou (2005) PlayStation 2
- Eco Creatures: Save the Forest (2007) Nintendo DS
- Sky Diving (2008) PlayStation 3
- Hello Kitty Kruisers (2014) Wii U
- Excave II: Wizard of the Underworld (2014) Nintendo 3DS
- Excave III: Tower of Destiny (2015) Nintendo 3DS
- Drive Girls (2017) PlayStation Vita
- Baku + Neko (2022) Android, iOS
