= List of Sony Interactive Entertainment video games =

The following is a list of video games published by Sony Interactive Entertainment, formerly known as Sony Computer Entertainment.

== Video games ==
PSN PlayStation Network-only release

List of games
Title	System	Original release date	Developer(s)	Notes	Ref(s)
Crime Crackers	PlayStation	December 3, 1994	Media.Vision / Japan Studio	Japan only	
Ridge Racer	PlayStation	December 3, 1994	Namco	North America (original release) and Europe only; licensed by Namco	
Motor Toon Grand Prix	PlayStation	December 16, 1994	Japan Studio (Polys Entertainment)	Japan only	
Discworld	PlayStation	1995	Teeny Weeny Games Perfect 10 Productions	Published by Psygnosis	
Sengoku Cyber: Fujimaru Jigokuhen	PlayStation	1995	Pandora Box / Japan Studio	Japan only	
Sentou Kokka: Air Land Battle	PlayStation	1995	Soliton / Japan Studio	Japan only	
Shanghai: Banri no Choujou	PlayStation	1995	Success	Japan only; licensed by Activision	
Battle Arena Toshinden	PlayStation	January 1, 1995	Tamsoft	North America and PAL only; licensed by Takara	
Cyber Sled	PlayStation	January 27, 1995	Namco	Europe only; licensed by Namco	
Kileak: The DNA Imperative	PlayStation	January 27, 1995	Genki	North America and Europe only	
The Raiden Project	PlayStation	January 27, 1995	Seibu Kaihatsu	North America only; licensed by Seibu Kaihatsu	
Tekken	PlayStation	March 31, 1995	Namco	Europe only; licensed by Namco	
Victory Zone	PlayStation	March 31, 1995	Japan Studio		
Jumping Flash!	PlayStation	April 28, 1995	Exact / Ultra / Japan Studio		
Rapid Reload	PlayStation	April 28, 1995	Media.Vision / Japan Studio	Japan and PAL only	
Air Combat	PlayStation	June 30, 1995	Namco	Co-published with Namco in PAL only	
Arc the Lad	PlayStation	June 30, 1995	G-Craft / Japan Studio	Japan only	
Philosoma	PlayStation	July 28, 1995	Epics / Japan Studio		
ESPN Extreme Games	PlayStation	September 9, 1995	989 Studios	Later renamed 1Xtreme due to licensing conflicts	
Hermie Hopperhead: Scrap Panic	PlayStation	September 29, 1995	Yuke's / Japan Studio	Japan only	
Novastorm	PlayStation	September 29, 1995	Psygnosis	Published by Psygnosis	
Wipeout	PlayStation	September 29, 1995	Psygnosis	Published by Psygnosis	
3D Lemmings	PlayStation	October 1995	Clockwork Games	Published by Psygnosis	
Mortal Kombat 3	PlayStation	October 7, 1995	Midway Games	Licensed by Midway Games	
Wizardry VII: Crusaders of the Dark Savant	PlayStation	October 13, 1995	Soliton / Japan Studio		
Destruction Derby	PlayStation	October 20, 1995	Reflections Interactive	Published by Psygnosis	
Beyond the Beyond	PlayStation	November 3, 1995	Camelot Software Planning / Japan Studio	Japan and North America only	
Twisted Metal	PlayStation	November 5, 1995	SingleTrac		
Warhawk	PlayStation	November 10, 1995	SingleTrac		
NFL GameDay	PlayStation	December 4, 1995	989 Sports	North America only	
NHL FaceOff	PlayStation	December 19, 1995	989 Sports	North America and PAL only	
Project Horned Owl	PlayStation	December 29, 1995	Alfa System / Japan Studio	Japan and North America only	
A-IV Evolution Global	PlayStation	1996	Artdink	Licensed by Artdink	
Adidas Power Soccer	PlayStation	1996	Psygnosis	Published by Psygnosis	
Defcon 5	PlayStation	1996	Millennium Interactive	Published by Psygnosis in PAL only	
Namco Soccer Prime Goal	PlayStation	1996	Namco	PAL only; licensed by Namco	
Namco Tennis Smash Court	PlayStation	1996	Namco	PAL only; licensed by Namco	
Penny Racers	PlayStation	1996	Tamsoft	PAL only; licensed by Takara	
RayStorm	PlayStation	1996	Taito	PAL only; licensed by Taito	
Krazy Ivan	PlayStation	January 1996	Psygnosis	Published by Psygnosis	
Starblade Alpha	PlayStation	February 1996	Namco	PAL only; licensed by Namco	
Assault Rigs	PlayStation	February 1, 1996	Psygnosis	Published by Psygnosis	
Mickey's Wild Adventure	PlayStation	March 1, 1996	Traveller's Tales	PAL only; licensed by Disney Interactive Studios	
NBA ShootOut	PlayStation	March 20, 1996	Team Soho	North America and PAL only	
Jumping Flash! 2	PlayStation	April 26, 1996	Exact / MuuMuu / Japan Studio		
Ridge Racer Revolution	PlayStation	May 1996	Namco	PAL only; licensed by Namco	
Battle Arena Toshinden 2	PlayStation	May 23, 1996	Tamsoft	PAL only; licensed by Takara	
Motor Toon Grand Prix 2	PlayStation	May 24, 1996	Japan Studio (Polys Entertainment)		
Chronicles of the Sword	PlayStation	June 1996	Synthetic Dimensions	Published by Psygnosis	
Aquanaut's Holiday	PlayStation	July 7, 1996	Artdink	North America and PAL only; licensed by Artdink	
PopoloCrois Monogatari	PlayStation	July 12, 1996	Epics / Japan Studio	Japan only	
Galaxian^3	PlayStation	August 1996	Namco	PAL only; licensed by Namco	
Tobal No. 1	PlayStation	August 2, 1996	DreamFactory	North America and PAL only; licensed by Square	
Bogey Dead 6	PlayStation	August 6, 1996	Pegasus Japan / Bit Town	North America and PAL only; licensed by Asmik Ace Entertainment and Pegasus Japan	
Namco Museum Vol. 1	PlayStation	August 17, 1996	Namco	PAL only; licensed by Namco	
Cool Boarders	PlayStation	August 30, 1996	UEP Systems	North America and PAL only	
The King of Fighters '95	PlayStation	August 31, 1996	SNK	North America and PAL only; licensed by SNK	
Crash Bandicoot	PlayStation	September 9, 1996	Naughty Dog	Licensed by Universal Interactive Studios	
NCAA Gamebreaker	PlayStation	September 19, 1996	989 Sports	North America only	
Victory Zone 2	PlayStation	September 20, 1996	Japan Studio		
Formula 1	PlayStation	September 30, 1996	Bizarre Creations	Published by Psygnosis	
Myst	PlayStation	September 30, 1996	Cyan Worlds Alfa System	Published by Psygnosis	
Tekken 2	PlayStation	October 2, 1996	Namco	PAL only; licensed by Namco	
Epidemic	PlayStation	October 14, 1996	Genki	North America and PAL only	
MLB Pennant Race	PlayStation	October 14, 1996	989 Sports	North America only	
Wipeout 2097	PlayStation	October 18, 1996	Psygnosis	Published by Psygnosis	
NHL FaceOff '97	PlayStation	October 22, 1996	Killer Game		
The Adventures of Lomax	PlayStation	October 22, 1996	Psygnosis	Published by Psygnosis	
Destruction Derby 2	PlayStation	November 1996	Reflections Interactive	Published by Psygnosis	
Namco Museum Vol. 2	PlayStation	November 1996	Namco	PAL only; licensed by Namco	
Arc the Lad II	PlayStation	November 1, 1996	G-Craft / Japan Studio	Japan only	
Pandemonium!	PlayStation	November 5, 1996	Toys for Bob	Co-published with Crystal Dynamics in PAL only	
2Xtreme	PlayStation	November 6, 1996	989 Studios		
Jet Moto	PlayStation	November 8, 1996	SingleTrac		
Jet Moto	Microsoft Windows	November 13, 1997	SingleTrac		
Twisted Metal 2	PlayStation	November 8, 1996	SingleTrac		
Twisted Metal 2	Microsoft Windows	November 13, 1997	SingleTrac		
Rurouni Kenshin: Meiji Kenyaku Romantan – Ishin Gekitou Hen	PlayStation	November 29, 1996	Zoom / Japan Studio	Japan only	
Samurai Shodown III: Blades of Blood	PlayStation	November 30, 1996	SNK	North America and PAL only; licensed by SNK	
Broken Sword: The Shadow of the Templars	PlayStation	December 1996	Revolution Software	PAL only; licensed by Revolution Software	
NFL GameDay 97	PlayStation	December 4, 1996	989 Sports	North America only	
Fluid	PlayStation	December 6, 1996	Opus / Japan Studio	Japan and PAL only	
PaRappa the Rapper	PlayStation	December 6, 1996	NanaOn-Sha / Japan Studio		
PaRappa the Rapper	PlayStation Portable	December 7, 2006	Epics / Japan Studio		
PaRappa the Rapper	PlayStation 4	April 4, 2017	Epics / Japan Studio		
Soul Edge	PlayStation	December 20, 1996	Namco (Project Soul)	Co-published with Namco in PAL only	
Wild Arms	PlayStation	December 20, 1996	Media.Vision / Japan Studio		
Ace Combat 2	PlayStation	1997	Namco	Co-published with Namco in PAL only	
Battle Arena Toshinden 3	PlayStation	1997	Tamsoft	Co-published with Takara in PAL only	
Bloody Roar	PlayStation	1997	Hudson Soft	North America only	
Carnage Heart	PlayStation	1997	Artdink	Co-published with Artdink in North America and PAL only	
CART World Series	PlayStation	1997	989 Studios	North America only	
Colony Wars	PlayStation	1997	Psygnosis	Published by Psygnosis	
Discworld II: Missing Presumed...?!	PlayStation	1997	Perfect Entertainment	Published by Psygnosis	
Disney's Hercules	PlayStation	1997	Eurocom	Co-published with Disney Interactive in PAL only	
King's Field	PlayStation	1997	FromSoftware	Co-published with FromSoftware in PAL only	
League of Pain	PlayStation	1997	Beyond Reality	Published by Psygnosis	
Lifeforce Tenka	PlayStation	1997	Psygnosis	Published by Psygnosis in North America and PAL only	
Monster Trucks	PlayStation	1997	Reflections Interactive	Published by Psygnosis in North America and PAL only	
Namco Museum Vol. 3	PlayStation	1997	Namco	Co-published with Namco in PAL only	
Namco Museum Vol. 4	PlayStation	1997	Namco	Co-published with Namco in PAL only	
Namco Museum Vol. 5	PlayStation	1997	Namco	Co-published with Namco in PAL only	
Overboard!	PlayStation	1997	Psygnosis	Published by Psygnosis	
Princess Maker: Yumemiru Yousei	PlayStation	1997	Gainax	Japan only	
Rage Racer	PlayStation	1997	Namco	Co-published with Namco in PAL only	
Ray Tracers	PlayStation	1997	Taito	Co-published with Taito in PAL only	
Real Bout Fatal Fury	PlayStation	1997	SNK	Co-published with SNK in PAL only	
Rosco McQueen Firefighter Extreme	PlayStation	1997	Slippery Snake Studio	Published by Psygnosis	
Rush Hour	PlayStation	1997	Clockwork Games	Published by Psygnosis	
Sentient	PlayStation	1997	Psygnosis	Published by Psygnosis in North America only	
Steel Reign	PlayStation	1997	Chantemar Creations		
Tail of the Sun	PlayStation	1997	Artdink	Co-published with Artdink in North America only	
The City of Lost Children	PlayStation	1997	Psygnosis	Published by Psygnosis in North America and PAL only	
Time Crisis	PlayStation	1997	Namco	Co-published with Namco in PAL only	
Velldeselba Senki Tsubasa no Kunshou	PlayStation	1997	Japan Studio	Japan only	
Xevious 3D/G+	PlayStation	1997	Namco	Co-published with Namco in PAL only	
Z	PlayStation	1997	The Bitmap Brothers	Co-published with GT Interactive in PAL only	
Shadow Master	PlayStation	1997	HammerHead	Published by Psygnosis in North America and PAL only	
Shadow Master	Microsoft Windows	1998	HammerHead	Published by Psygnosis in North America and PAL only	
Final Fantasy VII	PlayStation	January 31, 1997	Square	Co-published with Square in North America and PAL only	
I.Q.: Intelligent Qube	PlayStation	January 31, 1997	Epics / Japan Studio		
Rally Cross	PlayStation	February 28, 1997	989 Studios		
NBA ShootOut '97	PlayStation	March 11, 1997	Team Soho		
Bushido Blade	PlayStation	March 14, 1997	Lightweight	Co-published with Square in North America and PAL only	
Adidas Power Soccer International 97	PlayStation	April 11, 1997	Psygnosis	Published by Psygnosis	
Alundra	PlayStation	April 11, 1997	Matrix Software / Japan Studio	Published by Sony Computer Entertainment in Japan and by Psygnosis in PAL only	
Porsche Challenge	PlayStation	April 11, 1997	Team Soho		
Pet in TV	PlayStation	May 23, 1997	MuuMuu / Japan Studio	Japan and PAL only	
Baby Universe	PlayStation	June 20, 1997	3D Kaleidoscope / Japan Studio	Japan and PAL only	
Final Fantasy Tactics	PlayStation	June 20, 1997	Square	Co-published with Square in North America only	
Formula 1	Microsoft Windows	June 27, 1997	Bizarre Creations	Published by Psygnosis	
Zero Divide 2	PlayStation	June 27, 1997	Zoom	Co-published with Zoom in PAL only	
Quest for Fame	PlayStation	July 10, 1997	Virtual Music Entertainment / Japan Studio	Japan only	
SaGa Frontier	PlayStation	July 11, 1997	Square	Co-published with Square in North America only	
Everybody's Golf	PlayStation	July 17, 1997	Camelot Software Planning / Japan Studio		
Ghost in the Shell	PlayStation	July 17, 1997	Exact / Japan Studio	Japan and PAL only	
Arc the Lad: Monster Game with Casino Game	PlayStation	July 31, 1997	G-Craft / Japan Studio	Japan only	
MLB '98	PlayStation	August 1997	989 Sports	North America only	
Cool Boarders 2	PlayStation	August 28, 1997	UEP Systems	North America and PAL only	
Formula 1 97	PlayStation	September 1997	Bizarre Creations	Published by Psygnosis	
NFL GameDay 98	PlayStation	September 1997	989 Sports	North America only	
Linda Cube	PlayStation	September 25, 1997	Alfa System / MARS Corporation / Japan Studio	Japan only	
Rapid Racer	PlayStation	October 1, 1997	Team Soho		
G-Police	PlayStation	October 15, 1997	Psygnosis	Published by Psygnosis	
NHL FaceOff 98	PlayStation	October 31, 1997	Killer Game	North America and PAL only	
Nightmare Creatures	PlayStation	October 31, 1997	Kalisto Entertainment	Co-published with Kalisto Entertainment in PAL only	
Crash Bandicoot 2: Cortex Strikes Back	PlayStation	November 6, 1997	Naughty Dog		
The Granstream Saga	PlayStation	November 6, 1997	Quintet / Japan Studio	Published by Sony Computer Entertainment in Japan and co-published with ARC Entertainment in PAL only	
Jet Moto 2	PlayStation	November 11, 1997	SingleTrac		
Einhänder	PlayStation	November 20, 1997	Square	Co-published with Square in North America only	
NCAA Gamebreaker 98	PlayStation	November 21, 1997	989 Sports	North America only	
Crime Crackers 2	PlayStation	November 27, 1997	Media.Vision / Japan Studio	Japan only	
Spawn: The Eternal	PlayStation	December 9, 1997	989 Studios		
Adidas Power Soccer 2	PlayStation	December 10, 1997	Shen Technologies	Published by Psygnosis	
Broken Sword II: The Smoking Mirror	PlayStation	December 11, 1997	Revolution Software	PAL only	
Elemental Gearbolt	PlayStation	December 11, 1997	Alfa System / Japan Studio	Japan only	
Jersey Devil	PlayStation	December 12, 1997	Behaviour Interactive	North America only	
Tanarus	Microsoft Windows	December 12, 1997	Sony Online Entertainment	Published by 989 Studios	
Rurouni Kenshin: Meiji Kenkaku Romantan – Juu Yuushi Inbou Hen	PlayStation	December 18, 1997	Pandora Box / Japan Studio	Japan only	
Gran Turismo	PlayStation	December 23, 1997	Japan Studio (Polys Entertainment)		
Tomba!	PlayStation	December 25, 1997	Whoopee Camp	North America and PAL only	
Armored Core	PlayStation	1998	FromSoftware	Co-published with FromSoftware in PAL only	
Blast Radius	PlayStation	1998	Psygnosis	Published by Psygnosis	
Bomberman World	PlayStation	1998	Hudson Soft	Co-published with Hudson Soft in PAL only	
Colony Wars: Vengeance	PlayStation	1998	Psygnosis	Published by Psygnosis	
Contender	PlayStation	1998	Victor Interactive Software	North America only	
Dead or Alive	PlayStation	1998	Tecmo	Co-published with Tecmo in PAL only	
ESPN X Games Pro Boarder	PlayStation	1998	Radical Entertainment	Co-published with ESPN Digital Games in PAL only	
Klonoa: Door to Phantomile	PlayStation	1998	Namco	Co-published with Namco in PAL only	
Libero Grande	PlayStation	1998	Namco	Co-published with Namco in PAL only	
Newman/Haas Racing	PlayStation	1998	Studio 33	Published by Psygnosis	
NFL Xtreme	PlayStation	1998	989 Sports	Published by 989 Sports in North America and by Sony Computer Entertainment in PAL only	
O.D.T. – Escape... Or Die Trying	PlayStation	1998	FDI	Published by Psygnosis	
Oh No! More Lemmings	PlayStation	1998	DMA Design	Published by Psygnosis	
Point Blank	PlayStation	1998	Namco	Co-published with Namco in PAL only	
Psybadek	PlayStation	1998	Psygnosis	Published by Psygnosis in North America and PAL only	
Rascal	PlayStation	1998	Traveller's Tales	Published by Psygnosis in North America and PAL only	
Sentinel Returns	PlayStation	1998	Hookstone	Published by Psygnosis	
Tekken 3	PlayStation	1998	Namco	Co-published with Namco in PAL only	
The Fifth Element	PlayStation	1998	Kalisto Entertainment	Co-published with Kalisto Entertainment in PAL only	
Treasures of the Deep	PlayStation	1998	Black Ops Entertainment	Co-published with Namco in PAL only	
Bust a Groove	PlayStation	January 29, 1998	Metro	Co-published with Enix by 989 Studios in North America and by Sony Computer Entertainment in PAL only	
NBA ShootOut 98	PlayStation	March 11, 1998	989 Sports	Published by 989 Sports in North America and by Sony Computer Entertainment in PAL only	
MLB '99	PlayStation	April 14, 1998	989 Sports	North America only	
Blasto	PlayStation	April 16, 1998	989 Studios		
Adidas Power Soccer 98	PlayStation	May 1, 1998	Shen Technologies	Published by Psygnosis	
Tomoyasu Hotei: Stolen Song	PlayStation	May 21, 1998	Virtual Music Entertainment / Japan Studio	Japan only	
Formula 1 97	Microsoft Windows	June 17, 1998	Bizarre Creations	Published by Psygnosis	
Devil Dice	PlayStation	June 18, 1998	Shift / Japan Studio	Japan and PAL only	
Spice World	PlayStation	June 19, 1998	Team Soho	Published by Sony Computer Entertainment in PAL and by Psygnosis in North America only	
Yarudora Series Vol. 1: Double Cast	PlayStation	June 25, 1998	Sugar & Rockets / Japan Studio	Japan only	
Cardinal Syn	PlayStation	June 26, 1998	Kronos Digital Entertainment		
Kula World	PlayStation	July 10, 1998	Game Design Sweden AB	Published by Sony Computer Entertainment in Japan and PAL, and by Psygnosis in North America only	
Souten no Shiroki Kami no Za: Great Peak	PlayStation	July 16, 1998	Pandora Box / Japan Studio	Japan only	
Yarudora Series Vol. 2: Kisetsu O Dakishimete	PlayStation	July 23, 1998	Sugar & Rockets / Japan Studio	Japan only	
Star Ocean: The Second Story	PlayStation	July 30, 1998	tri-Ace	Co-published with Enix in North America and PAL only	
NFL GameDay 99	PlayStation	August 25, 1998	Red Zone Interactive	Published by 989 Sports in North America only	
NFL GameDay 99	Microsoft Windows	September 1998	Red Zone Interactive	Published by 989 Sports in North America only	
Spyro the Dragon	PlayStation	September 9, 1998	Insomniac Games		
NHL FaceOff 99	PlayStation	September 30, 1998	Killer Game	Published by 989 Sports in North America and PAL only	
Running Wild	PlayStation	October 6, 1998	Blue Shift, Inc.		
MediEvil	PlayStation	October 9, 1998	Guerrilla Cambridge		
Yarudora Series Vol. 3: Sampaguita	PlayStation	October 15, 1998	Sugar & Rockets / Japan Studio	Japan only	
Cool Boarders 3	PlayStation	October 27, 1998	Idol Minds	Published by 989 Sports in North America and by Sony Computer Entertainment in PAL only	
NCAA GameBreaker 99	PlayStation	October 27, 1998	Red Zone Interactive	Published by 989 Sports in North America only	
Legend of Legaia	PlayStation	October 29, 1998	Prokion / Contrail / Japan Studio		
Formula 1 98	PlayStation	October 30, 1998	Visual Science	Published by Psygnosis in North America and PAL only	
Rally Cross 2	PlayStation	November 1998	Idol Minds		
Crash Bandicoot: Warped	PlayStation	November 3, 1998	Naughty Dog		
Twisted Metal III	PlayStation	November 10, 1998	989 Studios	Published by 989 Studios in North America only	
CyberStrike 2	Microsoft Windows	November 17, 1998	Simutronics	Published by 989 Studios in North America only	
A Bug's Life	PlayStation	November 18, 1998	Traveller's Tales	Co-published with Disney Interactive	
PopoRogue	PlayStation	November 26, 1998	Epics / Japan Studio	Japan only	
Yarudora Series Vol. 4: Yukiwari no Hana	PlayStation	November 26, 1998	Sugar & Rockets / Japan Studio	Japan only	
Wonder Trek	PlayStation	December 10, 1998	Zest Works / Japan Studio	Japan only	
Ehrgeiz	PlayStation	December 17, 1998	DreamFactory	Co-published with Square in Japan and PAL only (Note: Uncredited on PAL and some Japan releases)	
I.Q Final	PlayStation	December 23, 1998	Epics / Japan Studio		
Alundra 2: A New Legend Begins	PlayStation	1999	Matrix Software / Japan Studio	Japan only	
Anna Kournikova's Smash Court Tennis	PlayStation	1999	Namco	Co-published with Namco in PAL only	
Attack of the Saucerman	PlayStation	1999	Fube Industries	Published by Psygnosis	
Barbie: Race & Ride	PlayStation	1999	Runecraft	PAL only	
Bloody Roar II	PlayStation	1999	Hudson Soft	North America only	
Destrega	PlayStation	1999	Omega Force	Co-published with Koei in PAL only	
A Bug's Life Activity Center	PlayStation	1999	Engineering Animation	Co-published with Disney Interactive in PAL only	
Disney's Magical Tetris	PlayStation	1999	Capcom	Co-published with Disney Interactive in PAL only	
Disney's Tarzan	PlayStation	1999	Eurocom	Co-published with Disney Interactive in PAL only	
Eliminator	PlayStation	1999	Magenta Software	Published by Psygnosis	
G-Police: Weapons of Justice	PlayStation	1999	Psygnosis	Published by Psygnosis in North America and by Sony Computer Entertainment in PAL only	
Global Domination	PlayStation	1999	Impressions Games	Published by Psygnosis	
Kingsley's Adventure	PlayStation	1999	Psygnosis	Published by Psygnosis in North America and PAL only	
NFL Xtreme 2	PlayStation	1999	989 Sports	Published by 989 Sports in North America only	
Point Blank 2	PlayStation	1999	Namco	Co-published with Namco in PAL only	
R-Type Delta	PlayStation	1999	Irem	Co-published with Irem in PAL only	
R4: Ridge Racer Type 4	PlayStation	1999	Namco	Co-published with Namco in PAL only	
Retro Force	PlayStation	1999	Psygnosis	Published by Psygnosis in PAL only	
Rollcage	PlayStation	1999	Attention to Detail	Published by Psygnosis	
Speed Freaks	PlayStation	1999	Funcom	North America and PAL only	
Tamago de Puzzle	PlayStation	1999	Matrix Software / Japan Studio		
The X-Files Game	PlayStation	1999	HyperBole Studios	Co-published with Fox Interactive in PAL only	
Tiny Tank: Up Your Arsenal	PlayStation	1999	Appaloosa Interactive / AndNow	North America and PAL only	
Tiny Toon Adventures: Buster and the beanstalk	PlayStation	1999	Terraglyph Interactive Studios	PAL only	
XI Jumbo	PlayStation	1999	Shift / Japan Studio	Japan only	
NCAA Final Four 99	PlayStation	January 13, 1999	Killer Game	Published by 989 Sports in North America only	
Circadia	PlayStation	January 14, 1999	Alvion / Japan Studio	Japan only	
Pocket MuuMuu	PlayStation	February 4, 1999	Sugar & Rockets / Japan Studio	Japan only	
Final Fantasy VIII	PlayStation	February 11, 1999	Square	Co-published with Square in PAL, China, Hong Kong and Singapore only (Note: Uncredited on PAL releases)	
Syphon Filter	PlayStation	February 16, 1999	Bend Studio	Published by 989 Studios in North America and by Sony Computer Entertainment in PAL only	
Final Fantasy VI	PlayStation	March 11, 1999	Square	Co-published with Square in PAL only	
Global Force: Shin Sentou Kokka	PlayStation	March 11, 1999	Marionette / Japan Studio	Japan only	
EverQuest	Microsoft Windows	March 16, 1999	Sony Online Entertainment / 989 Studios	Published by Sony Online Entertainment in North America only	
Um Jammer Lammy	PlayStation	March 18, 1999	NanaOn-Sha / Japan Studio		
MLB 2000	PlayStation	March 29, 1999	989 Sports	Published by 989 Sports in North America only	
Pro 18 World Tour Golf	PlayStation	March 31, 1999	Intelligent Games	Published by Psygnosis	
Pro 18 World Tour Golf	Microsoft Windows	June 30, 1999	Intelligent Games	Published by Psygnosis	
Blood Lines	PlayStation	April 1, 1999	Radical Entertainment	PAL only	
3Xtreme	PlayStation	April 20, 1999	989 Sports	Published by 989 Sports in North America only	
Omega Boost	PlayStation	April 22, 1999	Polyphony Digital		
Pocket Dungeon	PlayStation	May 4, 1999	Liquid / Japan Studio	Japan only	
Ore no Shikabane o Koete Yuke	PlayStation	June 17, 1999	Alfa System / MARS Corporation / Japan Studio	Japan only	
Ore no Shikabane o Koete Yuke	PlayStation Portable	November 10, 2011	Alfa System / MARS Corporation / Japan Studio	Japan only	
Ape Escape	PlayStation	June 18, 1999	Japan Studio		
Grandia	PlayStation	June 24, 1999	Game Arts	North America only	
Doko Demo Issyo	PlayStation	July 22, 1999	Japan Studio	Japan only	
Gekisou TomaRunner	PlayStation	July 22, 1999	Desert Productions / Japan Studio	Japan only	
Everybody's Golf 2	PlayStation	July 29, 1999	Clap Hanz / Japan Studio		
Panekit	PlayStation	August 5, 1999	Susami / Japan Studio	Japan only	
NCAA GameBreaker 2000	PlayStation	August 11, 1999	Red Zone Interactive	Published by 989 Sports in North America only	
NFL GameDay 2000	PlayStation	August 11, 1999	Red Zone Interactive / 989 Sports	Published by 989 Sports in North America only	
Jet Moto 3	PlayStation	August 30, 1999	Locomotive Games	Published by 989 Sports in North America only	
Wild Arms 2	PlayStation	September 2, 1999	Media.Vision / Japan Studio	Japan and North America only	
Ore no Ryouri	PlayStation	September 9, 1999	Argent / Japan Studio	Japan only	
Wipeout 3	PlayStation	September 10, 1999	Psygnosis	Published by Sony Computer Entertainment in PAL and Japan, and by Psygnosis in North America	
NHL FaceOff 2000	PlayStation	September 15, 1999	SolWorks	Published by 989 Sports in North America and by Sony Computer Entertainment in PAL only	
Brightis	PlayStation	October 14, 1999	Quintet / Japan Studio	Japan only	
Robbit Mon Dieu	PlayStation	October 14, 1999	Sugar & Rockets / Japan Studio	Japan only	
Crash Team Racing	PlayStation	October 19, 1999	Naughty Dog		
Formula One 99	PlayStation	October 21, 1999	Studio 33	Published by Psygnosis in North America and Japan, and by Sony Computer Entertainment in PAL	
Poketan	PlayStation	October 21, 1999	Sugar & Rockets / Japan Studio	Japan only	
Cool Boarders 4	PlayStation	October 26, 1999	Idol Minds	Published by 989 Sports in North America and PAL only	
Arc the Lad III	PlayStation	October 28, 1999	Arc Entertainment / Japan Studio	Japan only	
Tomba! 2: The Evil Swine Return	PlayStation	October 28, 1999	Whoopee Camp	North America and PAL only	
Spyro 2: Ripto's Rage!	PlayStation	November 2, 1999	Insomniac Games		
Supercross Circuit	PlayStation	November 9, 1999	Idol Minds	Published by 989 Sports in North America only	
Pet in TV With my dear Dog	PlayStation	November 11, 1999	Sugar & Rockets / Japan Studio	Japan only	
Twisted Metal 4	PlayStation	November 16, 1999	989 Studios	Published by 989 Studios in North America only	
NCAA Final Four 2000	PlayStation	November 17, 1999	989 Sports	Published by 989 Sports in North America only	
The Legend of Dragoon	PlayStation	December 2, 1999	Japan Studio		
Vib-Ribbon	PlayStation	December 9, 1999	NanaOn-Sha / Japan Studio	Japan and PAL only	
Formula One 99	Microsoft Windows	December 10, 1999	Studio 33	Published by Psygnosis in North America and Japan, and by Sony Computer Entertainment in PAL	
This Is Football	PlayStation	December 10, 1999	Team Soho		
Gran Turismo 2	PlayStation	December 11, 1999	Polyphony Digital		
Love & Destroy	PlayStation	December 16, 1999	Inti Creates / Arc Entertainment / Japan Studio	Japan only	
NBA ShootOut 2000	PlayStation	December 21, 1999	989 Sports	Published by 989 Sports in North America only	
Ace Combat 3: Electrosphere	PlayStation	2000	Namco	Co-published with Namco in PAL only	
Barbie Super Sports	PlayStation	2000	Runecraft	PAL only	
Colin McRae Rally	PlayStation	2000	Codemasters	North America only	
Colony Wars: Red Sun	PlayStation	2000	Psygnosis	Published by Psygnosis	
Destruction Derby Raw	PlayStation	2000	Studio 33	PAL only	
Disney's Aladdin in Nasira's Revenge	PlayStation	2000	Argonaut Games	Co-published with Disney Interactive in PAL and North America only	
Disney's Story Studio: Mulan	PlayStation	2000	Media Station	Co-published with Disney Interactive in PAL only	
Disney's The Emperor's New Groove	PlayStation	2000	Argonaut Games	Co-published with Disney Interactive in North America and PAL only	
Dragon Valor	PlayStation	2000	Namco	Co-published with Namco in PAL only	
Ghoul Panic	PlayStation	2000	Eighting	Co-published with Namco in PAL only	
Grind Session	PlayStation	2000	Shaba Games	North America and PAL only	
Jackie Chan Stuntmaster	PlayStation	2000	Radical Entertainment	Co-published with Radical Entertainment in PAL only	
In Cold Blood	PlayStation	2000	Revolution Software	PAL only	
Monster Rancher	PlayStation	2000	Tecmo	Co-published with Tecmo in PAL only	
Moto Racer World Tour	PlayStation	2000	Delphine Software International	PAL only	
Mr. Driller	PlayStation	2000	Namco	Co-published with Namco in PAL only	
Koneko mo Issyo: Doko Demo Issyo Tsuika Disc	PlayStation	2000		Japan only	
Ms. Pac-Man Maze Madness	PlayStation	2000	Namco	Co-published with Namco in PAL only	
Pac-Man World	PlayStation	2000	Namco	Co-published with Namco in PAL only	
Muppet Monster Adventure	PlayStation	2000	Magenta Software	PAL only	
Muppet RaceMania	PlayStation	2000	Traveller's Tales	PAL only	
Rescue Shot	PlayStation	2000	Now Production	Co-published with Namco in PAL only	
Rollcage Stage II	PlayStation	2000	Attention to Detail	PAL only	
Tekken Tag Tournament	PlayStation 2	2000	Namco	Co-published with Namco in PAL only	
Shadow Madness	PlayStation	2000	Crave Entertainment	Co-published with Crave Entertainment in PAL only	
Space Debris	PlayStation	2000	Rage Games	PAL only	
Star Ixiom	PlayStation	2000	Namco	Co-published with Namco in PAL only	
Team Buddies	PlayStation	2000	Psygnosis	PAL only	
Terracon	PlayStation	2000	Picture House	PAL only	
Walt Disney's The Jungle Book Groove Party	PlayStation	2000	Ubisoft Montreal	Co-published with Disney Interactive in PAL only	
Wild 9	PlayStation	2000	Shiny Entertainment	Co-published with Interplay in Japan only	
Wipeout 3: Special Edition	PlayStation	2000	Psygnosis	PAL only	
Blood: The Last Vampire - Gekan	PlayStation 2	2000	Japan Studio	Japan only	
Blood: The Last Vampire - Joukan	PlayStation 2	2000	Japan Studio	Japan only	
Dead or Alive 2	PlayStation 2	2000	Team Ninja	Co-published with Tecmo in PAL only	
Ridge Racer V	PlayStation 2	2000	Namco	Co-published with Namco in PAL only	
Pocket Jiman	PlayStation	January 13, 2000	Sugar & Rockets / Japan Studio	Japan only	
Chase the Express	PlayStation	January 27, 2000	Japan Studio	Japan and PAL only	
PoPoLoCrois Monogatari II	PlayStation	January 27, 2000	Epics / Japan Studio	Japan only	
Addie no Okurimono: To Moze from Addie	PlayStation	February 3, 2000	Japan Studio	Japan only	
Fantavision	PlayStation 2	March 9, 2000	Japan Studio		
Syphon Filter 2	PlayStation	March 14, 2000	Bend Studio	Published by 989 Studios in North America and by Sony Computer Entertainment in PAL only	
MLB 2001	PlayStation	March 27, 2000	989 Sports	North America only	
Tiny Bullets	PlayStation	July 22, 2000	Kuusou Kagaku / Japan Studio	Japan only	
MediEvil 2	PlayStation	April 21, 2000	Guerrilla Cambridge		
Docchi Mecha!	PlayStation	April 27, 2000	Japan Studio	Japan only	
Aconcagua	PlayStation	June 1, 2000	Japan Studio	Japan only	
Boku no Natsuyasumi	PlayStation	June 22, 2000	Millennium Kitchen / Japan Studio	Japan only	
Boku no Natsuyasumi	PlayStation Portable	June 27, 2006	Millennium Kitchen / Japan Studio	Japan only	
Who Wants to Be a Millionaire 2nd Edition	PlayStation	June 23, 2000	Jellyvision	North America only	
Scandal	PlayStation 2	June 29, 2000	Sugar & Rockets / Japan Studio	Japan only	
TVDJ	PlayStation 2	June 29, 2000	Japan Studio	Japan only	
Bikkuri Mouse	PlayStation 2	July 27, 2000	Japan Studio	Japan only	
Magical Dice Kids	PlayStation	August 3, 2000	Arc Entertainment / Japan Studio	Japan only	
NFL GameDay 2001	PlayStation	August 15, 2000	989 Sports	North America only	
NFL GameDay 2001	PlayStation 2	November 16, 2000	989 Sports	North America only	
NCAA GameBreaker 2001	PlayStation	August 22, 2000	989 Sports	North America only	
NCAA GameBreaker 2001	PlayStation 2	December 19, 2000	989 Sports	North America only	
NHL FaceOff 2001	PlayStation	September 5, 2000	SolWorks	North America only	
NHL FaceOff 2001	PlayStation 2	February 6, 2001	989 Sports	North America only	
Bealphareth	PlayStation	September 28, 2000	Zealsoft / Japan Studio	Japan only	
Gunparade March	PlayStation	September 28, 2000	Alfa System / Japan Studio	Japan only	
Spyro: Year of the Dragon	PlayStation	October 10, 2000	Insomniac Games		
Formula One 2000	PlayStation	October 4, 2000	Studio 33	North America and PAL only	
Cool Boarders 2001	PlayStation	October 24, 2000	Idol Minds	North America only	
Cool Boarders 2001	PlayStation 2	May 22, 2001	Idol Minds	North America only	
NBA ShootOut 2001	PlayStation	October 24, 2000	989 Sports	North America only	
NBA ShootOut 2001	PlayStation 2	February 21, 2001	989 Sports	North America only	
This Is Football 2	PlayStation	November 3, 2000	Team Soho		
Crash Bash	PlayStation	November 7, 2000	Eurocom		
NCAA Final Four 2001	PlayStation	November 16, 2000	Killer Game		
NCAA Final Four 2001	PlayStation 2	December 19, 2000	Killer Game		
Sky Odyssey	PlayStation 2	November 17, 2000	Cross / XAX Entertainment / Future Creates / Japan Studio	Japan and PAL only	
Shachou Eiyuuden: The Eagle Shooting Heroes	PlayStation	November 30, 2000	Japan Studio	Japan only	
Kokohore! Pukka: Dig-a-Dig Pukka	PlayStation	December 7, 2000	MuuMuu / Japan Studio	Japan only	
Dark Cloud	PlayStation 2	December 14, 2000	Level-5 / Japan Studio		
The Bouncer	PlayStation 2	December 23, 2000	DreamFactory	Co-published with Square in PAL only	
Atlantis: The Lost Empire	PlayStation	2001	Eurocom	Co-published with Disney Interactive	
Party Time with Winnie The Pooh	PlayStation	2001	Doki Denki Studio	Co-published with Electronic Arts in PAL only	
The Little Mermaid II	PlayStation	2001	Blitz Games	Co-published with THQ in PAL only	
Libero Grande International	PlayStation	2001	Namco	Co-published with Namco in PAL only	
Point Blank 3	PlayStation	2001	Namco	Co-published with Namco in PAL only	
Time Crisis: Project Titan	PlayStation	2001	Flying Tiger Entertainment	Co-published with Namco in PAL only	
Bravo Music: Christmas Edition	PlayStation 2	2001	Desert Productions / Japan Studio	Japan only	
Frequency	PlayStation 2	2001	Harmonix	North America and PAL only	
ATV Offroad Fury	PlayStation 2	2001	Rainbow Studios		
Klonoa 2: Lunatea's Veil	PlayStation 2	2001	Namco	Co-published with Namco in PAL only	
MotoGP	PlayStation 2	2001	Namco	Co-published with Namco in PAL only	
Time Crisis II	PlayStation 2	2001	Namco	Co-published with Namco in PAL only	
Vampire Night	PlayStation 2	2001	Wow Entertainment	Co-published with Namco in PAL only	
Sagashi ni Ikouyo	PlayStation 2	January 11, 2001	Japan Studio	Japan only	
Tsugunai: Atonement	PlayStation 2	February 22, 2001	Cattle Call / Japan Studio	Japan only	
Extermination	PlayStation 2	March 8, 2001	Deep Space / Japan Studio		
Okage: Shadow King	PlayStation 2	March 15, 2001	Zener Works / Japan Studio	North America and Japan only	
C-12: Final Resistance	PlayStation	April 6, 2001	Guerrilla Cambridge		
Gran Turismo 3: A-Spec	PlayStation 2	April 28, 2001	Polyphony Digital		
MLB 2002	PlayStation	May 8, 2001	989 Sports	North America only	
Formula One 2001	PlayStation	May 25, 2001	Studio 33	PAL only	
Formula One 2001	PlayStation 2	May 25, 2001	Studio Liverpool	PAL only	
Who Wants to Be a Millionaire 3rd Edition	PlayStation	June 11, 2001	Jellyvision	North America only	
Twisted Metal: Black	PlayStation 2	June 19, 2001	Incognito Entertainment		
Mister Mosquito	PlayStation 2	June 21, 2001	Zoom / Japan Studio	Japan only	
Rimo-Cocoron	PlayStation 2	June 28, 2001	Japan Studio	Japan only	
Pipo Saru 2001	PlayStation 2	July 5, 2001	Japan Studio	Japan only	
Final Fantasy X	PlayStation 2	July 19, 2001	Square	Co-published with Square in PAL only	
Everybody's Golf 3	PlayStation 2	July 26, 2001	Clap Hanz / Japan Studio	Japan and North America only	
NFL GameDay 2002	PlayStation	August 7, 2001	989 Sports	North America only	
NFL GameDay 2002	PlayStation 2	December 4, 2001	Red Zone Interactive	North America only	
PaRappa the Rapper 2	PlayStation 2	August 30, 2001	NanaOn-Sha / Japan Studio		
NBA ShootOut 2002	PlayStation	September 21, 2001	989 Sports	North America only	
Ico	PlayStation 2	September 25, 2001	Japan Studio (Team Ico)		
SkyGunner	PlayStation 2	September 27, 2001	PixelArts / Japan Studio	Japan only	
This Is Football 2002	PlayStation 2	September 28, 2001	Team Soho	PAL and North America only	
The Yamanote Sen: Train Simulator Real	PlayStation 2	October 4, 2001	Ongakukan / Japan Studio	Japan only	
Mad Maestro!	PlayStation 2	October 11, 2001	Desert Productions / Japan Studio	Japan only	
Kinetica	PlayStation 2	October 16, 2001	Santa Monica Studio	North America only	
Genshi no Kotoba	PlayStation 2	October 18, 2001	Japan Studio	Japan only	
Monsters, Inc. Scream Team	PlayStation	November 6, 2001	Behaviour Interactive	Co-published with Disney Interactive in North America and PAL only	
Monsters, Inc. Scream Team	PlayStation 2	February 1, 2002	Behaviour Interactive	Co-published with Disney Interactive in North America and PAL only	
Syphon Filter 3	PlayStation	November 6, 2001	Bend Studio		
AirBlade	PlayStation 2	November 9, 2001	Criterion Games	PAL only	
NCAA Final Four 2002	PlayStation 2	November 12, 2001	989 Sports	North America only	
Twisted Metal: Small Brawl	PlayStation	November 27, 2001	Incognito Entertainment	North America only	
Legaia 2: Duel Saga	PlayStation 2	November 29, 2001	Prokion / Japan Studio		
Toro to Kyuujitsu	PlayStation 2	November 29, 2001	Japan Studio		
World Rally Championship	PlayStation 2	November 30, 2001	Evolution Studios		
Jak and Daxter: The Precursor Legacy	PlayStation 2	December 5, 2001	Naughty Dog		
Yoake no Mariko	PlayStation 2	December 6, 2001	Japan Studio	Japan only	
Alfred Chicken	PlayStation	2002	Twilight	PAL only	
Treasure Planet	PlayStation	2002	Magenta Software / Bizarre Creations	Co-published with Disney Interactive	
Treasure Planet	PlayStation 2	2002	Magenta Software / Bizarre Creations	Co-published with Disney Interactive	
Lilo & Stitch: Trouble in Paradise	PlayStation	2002	Blitz Games	Co-published with Disney Interactive	
Firebugs	PlayStation	2002	Attention to Detail	PAL only	
Formula One Arcade	PlayStation	2002	Studio 33	PAL only	
Jim Henson's The Hoobs	PlayStation	2002	Runecraft	PAL only	
Klonoa Beach Volleyball	PlayStation	2002	Namco	Co-published with Namco in PAL only	
Peter Pan in Disney's Return to Never Land	PlayStation	2002	Doki Denki	Co-published with Disney Interactive	
Stuart Little 2	PlayStation	2002	Magenta Software	North America and PAL only	
WRC: FIA World Rally Championship Arcade	PlayStation	2002	Unique Development Studios	PAL only	
Ace Combat: Distant Thunder	PlayStation 2	2002	Namco	Co-published with Namco in PAL only, released as Ace Combat 04: Shattered Skies in NTSC regions.	
Alpine Racer 3	PlayStation 2	2002	Namco	Co-published with Namco in PAL only	
ATV Offroad Fury 2	PlayStation 2	2002	Rainbow Studios	North America only	
Bravo Music: Chou-Meikyokuban	PlayStation 2	2002	Desert Productions / Japan Studio	Japan only	
Disney's Stitch: Experiment 626	PlayStation 2	2002	High Voltage Software		
Drakan: The Ancients' Gates	PlayStation 2	2002	Surreal Software	North America and PAL only	
Dropship: United Peace Front	PlayStation 2	2002	Psygnosis	PAL only	
Ecco the Dolphin: Defender of the Future	PlayStation 2	2002	Appaloosa Interactive	Co-published with Sega in PAL only	
Ferrari F355 Challenge	PlayStation 2	2002	Sega	Co-published with Sega in PAL only	
Headhunter	PlayStation 2	2002	Amuze	Co-published with Sega in PAL only	
Jet X20	PlayStation 2	2002	Killer Game	North America only	
Let's Bravo Music	PlayStation 2	2002	Desert Productions / Japan Studio	Japan only	
MotoGP 2	PlayStation 2	2002	Namco	Co-published with Namco in PAL only	
Rez	PlayStation 2	2002	United Game Artists	Co-published with Sega in PAL only	
Smash Court Tennis Pro Tournament	PlayStation 2	2002	Namco	Co-published with Namco in PAL only	
Space Channel 5	PlayStation 2	2002	United Game Artists	Co-published with Sega in PAL only	
Space Fishermen	PlayStation 2	2002	Land Ho! / Japan Studio	Japan only	
Surveillance Kanshisha	PlayStation 2	2002	Japan Studio	Japan only	
Tekken 4	PlayStation 2	2002	Namco	Co-published with Namco in PAL only	
Twisted Metal: Black Online	PlayStation 2	2002	Incognito Entertainment		
Virtua Fighter 4	PlayStation 2	2002	Sega	Co-published with Sega in PAL only	
Yoake no Mariko 2nd Act	PlayStation 2	2002	Japan Studio	Japan only	
Gran Turismo Concept 2001 Tokyo	PlayStation 2	January 1, 2002	Polyphony Digital	Japan only	
Wipeout Fusion	PlayStation 2	February 8, 2002	Studio Liverpool		
Dual Hearts	PlayStation 2	February 14, 2002	Matrix Software / Japan Studio	Japan only	
Final Fantasy Anthology	PlayStation	February 27, 2002	Square	Co-published with Square in PAL only	
Wild Arms 3	PlayStation 2	March 14, 2002	Media.Vision / Japan Studio	Japan and North America only	
Kingdom Hearts	PlayStation 2	March 28, 2002	Square	Co-published with Square in PAL only	
Final Fantasy XI	PlayStation 2	May 16, 2002	Square	Co-published with Square Enix in North America only	
Gran Turismo Concept 2002 Tokyo-Seoul	PlayStation 2	May 16, 2002	Polyphony Digital	South-Korea only	
Otostaz	PlayStation 2	May 30, 2002	Japan Studio	Japan only	
MLB 2003	PlayStation	June 19, 2002	989 Sports	North America only	
Popolocrois: Adventure of Beginnings	PlayStation 2	June 20, 2002	Epics / Japan Studio	Japan only	
Futari no Fantavision	PlayStation 2	July 4, 2002	Japan Studio	Japan only	
Boku no Natsuyasumi 2	PlayStation 2	July 11, 2002	Millennium Kitchen / Japan Studio	Japan only	
Boku no Natsuyasumi 2	PlayStation Portable	June 24, 2010	Millennium Kitchen / Japan Studio	Japan only	
Gran Turismo Concept 2002 Tokyo-Geneva	PlayStation 2	July 17, 2002	Polyphony Digital	PAL only	
Ape Escape 2	PlayStation 2	July 18, 2002	Japan Studio	Japan and PAL only	
The Mark of Kri	PlayStation 2	July 29, 2002	San Diego Studio	North America and PAL only	
NCAA GameBreaker 2003	PlayStation 2	August 13, 2002	989 Sports	North America only	
NFL GameDay 2003	PlayStation	August 13, 2002	989 Sports	North America only	
NFL GameDay 2003	PlayStation 2	August 13, 2002	989 Sports	North America only	
SOCOM U.S. Navy SEALs	PlayStation 2	August 27, 2002	Zipper Interactive		
Ninja Assault	PlayStation 2	September 9, 2002	Namco / Now Production	Co-published with Namco in PAL only	
Sly Cooper and the Thievius Raccoonus	PlayStation 2	September 23, 2002	Sucker Punch Productions		
NBA ShootOut 2003	PlayStation	September 24, 2002	Killer Game	North America only	
NBA ShootOut 2003	PlayStation 2	September 24, 2002	989 Sports	North America only	
Poinie's Poin	PlayStation 2	September 26, 2002	Alvion / Japan Studio	Japan only	
This is Football 2003	PlayStation 2	October 4, 2002	London Studio		
The Keihin Kyuukou: Train Simulator Real	PlayStation 2	October 31, 2002	Ongakukan / Japan Studio	Japan only	
Formula One 2002	PlayStation 2	November 1, 2002	Studio Liverpool		
Ratchet & Clank	PlayStation 2	November 4, 2002	Insomniac Games		
NHL FaceOff 2003	PlayStation 2	November 5, 2002	SolWorks	North America only	
NCAA Final Four 2003	PlayStation 2	November 27, 2002	Killer Game	North America only	
Dark Chronicle	PlayStation 2	November 28, 2002	Level-5 / Japan Studio		
WRC II Extreme	PlayStation 2	November 29, 2002	Evolution Studios		
Gacharoku	PlayStation 2	December 5, 2002	Agenda / Japan Studio	Japan only	
The Getaway	PlayStation 2	December 11, 2002	Team Soho		
Bombastic	PlayStation 2	December 19, 2002	Shift / Japan Studio	Japan only	
Amplitude	PlayStation 2	2003	Harmonix	North America and PAL only	
Deka Voice	PlayStation 2	2003		Japan only	
EyeToy: Groove	PlayStation 2	2003	London Studio		
Flipnic: Ultimate Pinball	PlayStation 2	2003	Japan Studio	Japan only	
Hardware: Online Arena	PlayStation 2	2003	London Studio	PAL and Korea only	
Jampack Winter 2003	PlayStation 2	2003		North America only	
MotoGP 3	PlayStation 2	2003	Namco	Co-published with Namco in PAL only	
Pac-Man World 2	PlayStation 2	2003	Namco	Co-published with Namco in PAL only	
Shibai Michi	PlayStation 2	2003		Japan only	
Shinobi	PlayStation 2	2003	Sega	Co-published with Sega in PAL only	
Space Channel 5: Part 2	PlayStation 2	2003	United Game Artists	Co-published with Sega in PAL only, except UK	
Time Crisis 3	PlayStation 2	2003	Nextech	Co-published with Namco in PAL only	
War of the Monsters	PlayStation 2	January 14, 2003	Incognito Entertainment		
Lifeline	PlayStation 2	January 30, 2003	Japan Studio	Japan only	
Jinx	PlayStation	January 31, 2003	HammerHead	PAL only	
EverQuest Online Adventures	PlayStation 2	February 11, 2003	Sony Online Entertainment	Published by Sony Online Entertainment in North America and by Sony Computer Entertainment in PAL only	
My Street	PlayStation 2	March 9, 2003	Idol Minds	North America and PAL only	
MLB 2004	PlayStation 2	March 10, 2003	989 Sports	North America only	
MLB 2004	PlayStation	April 30, 2003	989 Sports	North America only	
Arc the Lad: Twilight of the Spirits	PlayStation 2	March 20, 2003	Cattle Call / Japan Studio		
Primal	PlayStation 2	March 25, 2003	Guerrilla Cambridge		
PlanetSide	Microsoft Windows	May 19, 2003	Sony Online Entertainment	Published by Sony Online Entertainment in North America only	
Ka 2: Let's Go Hawaii	PlayStation 2	July 3, 2003	Zoom / Japan Studio	Japan only	
EyeToy: Play	PlayStation 2	July 4, 2003	London Studio		
Formula One 2003	PlayStation 2	July 11, 2003	Studio Liverpool		
Downhill Domination	PlayStation 2	July 22, 2003	Incognito Entertainment	North America and Japan only	
NCAA GameBreaker 2004	PlayStation 2	August 26, 2003	989 Sports	North America only	
NFL GameDay 2004	PlayStation	August 26, 2003	Red Zone Interactive / 989 Sports	North America only	
NFL GameDay 2004	PlayStation 2	August 26, 2003	Red Zone Interactive / 989 Sports	North America only	
NBA ShootOut 2004	PlayStation	October 6, 2003	Killer Game	North America only	
NBA ShootOut 2004	PlayStation 2	October 29, 2003	989 Sports	North America only	
Jak II	PlayStation 2	October 14, 2003	Naughty Dog		
ChainDive	PlayStation 2	October 16, 2003	Alvion / Japan Studio	Japan only	
Dog's Life	PlayStation 2	October 31, 2003	Frontier Developments	PAL only	
SOCOM II U.S. Navy SEALs	PlayStation 2	November 4, 2003	Zipper Interactive		
Siren	PlayStation 2	November 6, 2003	Japan Studio (Team Gravity)		
NCAA Final Four 2004	PlayStation 2	November 11, 2003	989 Sports	North America only	
Ratchet & Clank: Going Commando	PlayStation 2	November 11, 2003	Insomniac Games		
EverQuest Online Adventures: Frontiers	PlayStation 2	November 18, 2003	Sony Online Entertainment	Published by Sony Online Entertainment in North America only	
Kuma Uta	PlayStation 2	November 20, 2003	MuuMuu / Japan Studio	Japan only	
Mojib-Ribbon	PlayStation 2	November 20, 2003	NanaOn-Sha / Japan Studio	Japan only	
WRC 3	PlayStation 2	November 21, 2003	Evolution Studios		
Everybody's Golf 4	PlayStation 2	November 27, 2003	Clap Hanz / Japan Studio		
Wild Arms Alter Code: F	PlayStation 2	November 27, 2003	Media.Vision / Japan Studio	Japan only	
Gran Turismo 4 Prologue	PlayStation 2	December 4, 2003	Polyphony Digital		
Ghosthunter	PlayStation 2	December 5, 2003	Guerrilla Cambridge	PAL only	
Gacharoku 2: Kondo wa Sekai Isshuu yo!!	PlayStation 2	December 18, 2003	Agenda / Japan Studio	Japan only	
Athens 2004	PlayStation 2	2004	Eurocom		
ATV Offroad Fury 3	PlayStation 2	2004	Climax Studios (Climax Racing)	North America only	
Bakufuu Slash! Kizna Arashi	PlayStation 2	2004		Japan only	
Champions of Norrath: Realms of EverQuest	PlayStation 2	2004	Snowblind Studios	Published by Sony Online Entertainment in North America only	
Destruction Derby: Arenas	PlayStation 2	2004	Studio 33		
DJbox	PlayStation 2	2004		Japan only	
DJ: Decks & FX	PlayStation 2	2004		PAL only	
Doko Demo Issyo: Toro to Nagare Boshi	PlayStation 2	2004		Japan only	
EyeToy: Antigrav	PlayStation 2	2004	Harmonix	North America and PAL only	
EyeToy: Play 2	PlayStation 2	2004	London Studio	North America and PAL only	
Gretzky NHL 2005	PlayStation 2	2004	Page 44 Studios	North America only	
I-Ninja	PlayStation 2	2004	Argonaut Games	Co-published with Namco in PAL only	
Jackie Chan Adventures	PlayStation 2	2004	Atomic Planet Entertainment	PAL only	
Kill.Switch	PlayStation 2	2004	Namco	Co-published with Namco in PAL only	
Koufuku Sousakan	PlayStation 2	2004	Japan Studio	Japan only	
Prince of Persia: The Sands of Time	PlayStation 2	2004	Ubisoft Montreal	Co-published with Ubisoft in Japan only	
SingStar Party	PlayStation 2	2004	London Studio	PAL only	
Smash Court Tennis Pro Tournament 2	PlayStation 2	2004	Now Production	Co-published with Namco in PAL only	
Jet Li: Rise to Honor	PlayStation 2	February 17, 2004	San Mateo Studio		
MLB 2005	PlayStation	March 16, 2004	989 Sports	North America only	
MLB 2005	PlayStation 2	March 16, 2004	989 Sports	North America only	
Ghost in the Shell: Stand Alone Complex	PlayStation 2	March 18, 2004	Cavia / Japan Studio	Japan only	
Popolocrois: Adventure of the Law of the Moon	PlayStation 2	March 18, 2004	Epics / Japan Studio	Japan only	
This is Football 2004	PlayStation 2	March 26, 2004	London Studio		
Syphon Filter: The Omega Strain	PlayStation 2	May 4, 2004	Bend Studio		
Vib-Ripple	PlayStation 2	May 27, 2004	NanaOn-Sha / Japan Studio	Japan only	
SingStar	PlayStation 2	May 2004	London Studio	PAL only	
Ape Escape: Pumped & Primed	PlayStation 2	July 1, 2004	Japan Studio		
Finny the Fish & the Seven Waters	PlayStation 2	July 15, 2004	Japan Studio	Japan only	
Formula One 04	PlayStation 2	July 30, 2004	Studio Liverpool		
NFL GameDay 2005	PlayStation	August 1, 2004	989 Sports	North America only	
EyeToy: Monkey Mania	PlayStation 2	August 5, 2004	Japan Studio	Japan and PAL only	
Sly 2: Band of Thieves	PlayStation 2	September 14, 2004	Sucker Punch Productions		
Crisis Zone	PlayStation 2	September 17, 2004	Tose	Co-published with Namco in PAL only	
This is Football 2005	PlayStation 2	October 1, 2004	London Studio		
WRC 4	PlayStation 2	October 22, 2004	Evolution Studios		
Pride of the Dragon Peace	PlayStation 2	October 28, 2004	Japan Studio	Japan only	
Killzone	PlayStation 2	November 2, 2004	Guerrilla Games		
Killzone	PlayStation 3	October 23, 2012	Supermassive Games		
Ratchet & Clank: Up Your Arsenal	PlayStation 2	November 2, 2004	Insomniac Games		
Arc the Lad: End of Darkness	PlayStation 2	November 3, 2004	Cattle Call / Japan Studio	Japan only	
Jak 3	PlayStation 2	November 9, 2004	Naughty Dog		
The Getaway: Black Monday	PlayStation 2	November 12, 2004	London Studio		
Everybody's Golf Portable	PlayStation Portable	December 12, 2004	Clap Hanz / Japan Studio		
Doko Demo Issyo	PlayStation Portable	December 16, 2004	Japan Studio		
Gran Turismo 4	PlayStation 2	December 28, 2004	Polyphony Digital		
Ape Escape Academy	PlayStation Portable	December 30, 2004	Shift / Japan Studio		
Ace Combat:Squadron Leader	PlayStation 2	2005	Namco	Co-published with Namco in PAL only	
Champions: Return to Arms	PlayStation 2	2005	Snowblind Studios	Published by Sony Online Entertainment in North America only	
Death by Degrees	PlayStation 2	2005	Namco	Co-published with Namco in PAL only	
Peter Pan: Adventures in Never Land	PlayStation 2	2005	Doki Denki	Co-published with Disney Interactive in PAL only	
EyeToy: Chat	PlayStation 2	2005	London Studio	PAL only	
EyeToy: EduKids	PlayStation 2	2005	Arisu Media	Asia only	
EyeToy: Kinetic	PlayStation 2	2005	London Studio	North America and PAL only	
EyeToy: Play 3	PlayStation 2	2005	London Studio	PAL only	
Gaelic Games: Football	PlayStation 2	2005	IR Gurus	PAL only	
Gretzky NHL 2006	PlayStation 2	2005	Page 44 Studios	North America only	
Kenran Butou Sai: The Mars Daybreak	PlayStation 2	2005		Japan only	
Mawaza	PlayStation 2	2005	Media.Vision / Japan Studio	Japan only	
MotoGP 4	PlayStation 2	2005	Namco	Co-published with Namco in PAL only	
Roland Garros Paris 2005:Powered by Smash Court Tennis	PlayStation 2	2005	Now Production	Co-published with Namco in PAL only	
SingStar '80s	PlayStation 2	2005	London Studio		
SingStar Pop	PlayStation 2	2005	London Studio		
SingStar The Dome	PlayStation 2	2005	London Studio	PAL only	
SpyToy	PlayStation 2	2005	London Studio	North America and PAL only	
Stuart Little 3: Big Photo Adventure	PlayStation 2	2005	Magenta Software	PAL only	
Tekken 5	PlayStation 2	2005	Namco	Co-published with Namco in PAL only	
Xenosaga Episode II: Jenseits von Gut und böse	PlayStation 2	2005	Monolith Soft	Co-published with Namco in PAL only	
Archer Maclean's Mercury	PlayStation Portable	2005	Awesome Studios	Japan only	
ATV Offroad Fury: Blazin' Trails	PlayStation Portable	2005	Climax Studios (Climax Racing)	North America only	
F1 Grand Prix	PlayStation Portable	2005	Traveller's Tales		
Fired Up	PlayStation Portable	2005	London Studio		
Glorace: Phantastic Carnival	PlayStation Portable	2005		South Korea only	
Gretzky NHL	PlayStation Portable	2005		North America only	
Gretzky NHL 06	PlayStation Portable	2005		North America only	
Hand Dic	PlayStation Portable	2005		South Korea only	
Namco Museum Battle Collection	PlayStation Portable	2005		Co-published with Namco in PAL only	
Ridge Racer	PlayStation Portable	2005		Co-published with Namco in PAL only	
Untold Legends: Brotherhood of the Blade	PlayStation Portable	2005	Sony Online Entertainment	Published by Sony Online Entertainment in North America only	
WRC: FIA World Rally Championship	PlayStation Portable	2005	Traveller's Tales	PAL only	
PopoloCrois	PlayStation Portable	February 10, 2005	Epics / Japan Studio	Japan only	
MLB 2006	PlayStation 2	March 8, 2005	989 Sports	Published in North America only	
MLB 2006	PlayStation Portable	March 8, 2005	989 Sports	Published in North America only	
Ape Escape: On the Loose	PlayStation Portable	March 17, 2005	Japan Studio		
God of War	PlayStation 2	March 22, 2005	Santa Monica Studio	North America and PAL only	
World Tour Soccer: Challenge Edition	PlayStation Portable	March 22, 2005	London Studio		
Bokura no Kazoku	PlayStation 2	March 24, 2005	Millennium Kitchen / Japan Studio	Japan only	
Twisted Metal: Head-On	PlayStation Portable	March 24, 2005	Incognito Entertainment		
Wild Arms 4	PlayStation 2	March 24, 2005	Media.Vision / Japan Studio	Japan only	
NBA	PlayStation Portable	March 24, 2005	San Diego Studio	North America only	
Wipeout Pure	PlayStation Portable	March 24, 2005	Studio Liverpool		
Rise of the Kasai	PlayStation 2	April 5, 2005	BottleRocket Entertainment	North America only	
Genji: Dawn of the Samurai	PlayStation 2	June 30, 2005	Game Republic / Japan Studio		
Formula One 05	PlayStation 2	July 1, 2005	Studio Liverpool		
Ape Escape 3	PlayStation 2	July 14, 2005	Japan Studio		
Kingdom of Paradise	PlayStation Portable	July 21, 2005	Climax Entertainment / Japan Studio		
MediEvil: Resurrection	PlayStation Portable	September 1, 2005	Guerrilla Cambridge		
Brave: The Search for Spirit Dancer	PlayStation 2	September 2, 2005	VIS Entertainment	Co-published with VIS Entertainment in PAL only	
Ghost in the Shell: Stand Alone Complex	PlayStation Portable	September 15, 2005	Epics / Japan Studio		
Sly 3: Honor Among Thieves	PlayStation 2	September 26, 2005	Sucker Punch Productions		
NBA 06	PlayStation Portable	October 4, 2005	San Diego Studio	North America only	
NBA 06	PlayStation 2	November 1, 2005	San Diego Studio	North America only	
SOCOM 3 U.S. Navy SEALs	PlayStation 2	October 11, 2005	Zipper Interactive		
Jak X: Combat Racing	PlayStation 2	October 18, 2005	Naughty Dog	North America and PAL only	
Shadow of the Colossus	PlayStation 2	October 18, 2005	Japan Studio (Team Ico)		
The Con	PlayStation Portable	October 18, 2005	Think & Feel		
Buzz!: The Music Quiz	PlayStation 2	October 21, 2005	Relentless Software		
Ratchet: Deadlocked	PlayStation 2	October 25, 2005	Insomniac Games		
Ratchet: Deadlocked	PlayStation 3	May 21, 2013	Idol Minds		
Soulcalibur III	PlayStation 2	October 25, 2005	Namco (Project Soul)	Co-published with Namco in PAL only	
WRC: Rally Evolved	PlayStation 2	October 27, 2005	Evolution Studios	PAL only	
SOCOM U.S. Navy SEALs: Fireteam Bravo	PlayStation Portable	November 8, 2005	Zipper Interactive		
Pursuit Force	PlayStation Portable	November 10, 2005	Bigbig Studios	PAL and North America only	
Shinobido: Way of the Ninja	PlayStation 2	November 10, 2005	Acquire	PAL only	
Neopets: The Darkest Faerie	PlayStation 2	November 15, 2005	Idol Minds	North America only	
Talkman	PlayStation Portable	November 17, 2005	Japan Studio		
Go! Sudoku	PlayStation Portable	December 2, 2005	Sumo Digital		
Go! Sudoku	PlayStation 3	December 7, 2006	Sumo Digital	PSN	
Rogue Galaxy	PlayStation 2	December 8, 2005	Level-5 / Japan Studio		
Ape Academy 2	PlayStation Portable	December 15, 2005	Shift / Japan Studio	Japan and PAL only	
Work Time Fun	PlayStation Portable	December 22, 2005	Japan Studio	Japan only	
Ace Combat Zero: The Belkan War	PlayStation 2	2006	Namco	Co-published with Bandai Namco Games in PAL only	
ATV Offroad Fury 4	PlayStation 2	2006	Climax Studios (Climax Racing)		
Blood+ Souyoku no Battle Rondo	PlayStation 2	2006	Japan Studio	Japan only	
Buzz!: The Big Quiz	PlayStation 2	2006	Relentless Software		
Buzz!: The Sports Quiz	PlayStation 2	2006	Kuju Entertainment	PAL only	
Buzz! Junior: Jungle Party	PlayStation 2	2006	Magenta Software		
EyeToy: Kinetic Combat	PlayStation 2	2006	London Studio	PAL only	
EyeToy: Play Sports	PlayStation 2	2006	London Studio	PAL only	
Gunparade Orchestra: Ao no Shou	PlayStation 2	2006	Alfa System / Japan Studio	Japan only	
Gunparade Orchestra: Midori no Shou	PlayStation 2	2006	Alfa System / Japan Studio	Japan only	
Gunparade Orchestra: Shiro no Shou	PlayStation 2	2006	Alfa System / Japan Studio	Japan only	
SingStar Anthems	PlayStation 2	2006	London Studio	PAL only	
SingStar Legends	PlayStation 2	2006	London Studio		
SingStar Rocks!	PlayStation 2	2006	London Studio		
Urban Reign	PlayStation 2	2006	Namco	Co-published with Namco in PAL only	
Cash Guns Chaos DLX	PlayStation 3	2006	Sony Online Entertainment	Published by Sony Online Entertainment in North America only	
Mainichi Issho	PlayStation 3	2006	Game Arts	Japan only	
Ace Combat X: Skies of Deception	PlayStation Portable	2006	Access Games	Co-published with Namco in PAL only	
ATV Offroad Fury Pro	PlayStation Portable	2006	Climax Studios (Climax Racing)		
Blood+ Final Piece	PlayStation Portable	2006	Japan Studio	Japan only	
Blood: The Last Vampire	PlayStation Portable	2006	Japan Studio	Japan only	
Field Commander	PlayStation Portable	2006	Sony Online Entertainment	Published by Sony Online Entertainment in North America only	
Mercury Meltdown	PlayStation Portable	2006	Ignition Entertainment	Japan only	
MotoGP	PlayStation Portable	2006		Co-published with Namco in PAL only	
Passport to... Amsterdam	PlayStation Portable	2006		PAL only	
Passport to... Barcelona	PlayStation Portable	2006		PAL only	
Passport to... London	PlayStation Portable	2006		PAL only	
Passport to... Paris	PlayStation Portable	2006		PAL only	
Passport to... Prague	PlayStation Portable	2006		PAL only	
Passport to... Rome	PlayStation Portable	2006		PAL only	
Ridge Racer 2	PlayStation Portable	2006		Co-published with Namco in PAL only	
Tekken: Dark Resurrection	PlayStation Portable	2006		Co-published with Namco Bandai Games in PAL only	
Tenchi no Mon 2: Busouden	PlayStation Portable	2006	Climax Entertainment / Japan Studio	Japan only	
Untold Legends: The Warrior's Code	PlayStation Portable	2006	Sony Online Entertainment	Published by Sony Online Entertainment in North America only	
Rule of Rose	PlayStation 2	January 19, 2006	Punchline / Japan Studio	Japan only	
Tourist Trophy	PlayStation 2	January 26, 2006	Polyphony Digital		
Forbidden Siren 2	PlayStation 2	February 9, 2006	Japan Studio (Team Gravity)	Japan and PAL only	
Monster Kingdom: Jewel Summoner	PlayStation Portable	February 23, 2006	Gaia / Japan Studio	Japan only	
24: The Game	PlayStation 2	February 28, 2006	Guerrilla Cambridge	PAL only	
MLB 06: The Show	PlayStation 2	February 28, 2006	San Diego Studio	North America and Korea only	
MLB 06: The Show	PlayStation Portable	February 28, 2006	San Diego Studio	North America and Korea only	
Blade Dancer: Lineage of Light	PlayStation Portable	March 2, 2006	Hit Maker / Japan Studio	Japan only	
Lemmings	PlayStation Portable	March 9, 2006	Team17		
Lemmings	PlayStation 2	October 13, 2006	Team17 / Rusty Nutz		
Lemmings	PlayStation 3	December 7, 2006	Team17		
XI Coliseum	PlayStation Portable	March 9, 2006	Shift / Japan Studio	Japan only	
Daxter	PlayStation Portable	March 14, 2006	Ready at Dawn		
Neopets: Petpet Adventures: The Wand of Wishing	PlayStation Portable	March 14, 2006	San Diego Studio	North America only	
Syphon Filter: Dark Mirror	PlayStation Portable	March 14, 2006	Bend Studio		
Syphon Filter: Dark Mirror	PlayStation 2	September 18, 2007	Bend Studio		
Flow	Browser game	April 14, 2006	Thatgamecompany		
Flow	PlayStation 3	February 22, 2007	Thatgamecompany	PSN	
Flow	PlayStation Portable	March 6, 2008	SuperVillain Studios	PSN	
Flow	PlayStation 4	November 29, 2013	SuperVillain Studios	PSN	
Flow	PlayStation Vita	December 4, 2013	SuperVillain Studios	PSN	
LocoRoco	PlayStation Portable	June 23, 2006	Japan Studio		
LocoRoco	PlayStation 4	May 9, 2017	Japan Studio		
World Tour Soccer 2	PlayStation Portable	June 23, 2006	London Studio		
Brave Story: New Traveler	PlayStation Portable	July 4, 2006	Game Republic / Japan Studio	Japan only	
Brave Story: Wataru's Adventure	PlayStation 2	July 6, 2006	Japan Studio	Japan only	
Saru! Get You! Million Monkeys	PlayStation 2	July 13, 2006	Japan Studio	Japan only	
Formula One 06	PlayStation 2	July 27, 2006	Studio Liverpool		
Formula One 06	PlayStation Portable	July 28, 2006	Studio Liverpool		
Gangs of London	PlayStation Portable	September 1, 2006	London Studio		
Everybody's Tennis	PlayStation 2	September 14, 2006	Clap Hanz / Japan Studio		
NBA 07	PlayStation 2	September 25, 2006	San Diego Studio	North America only	
NBA 07	PlayStation Portable	September 25, 2006	San Diego Studio	North America only	
NBA 07	PlayStation 3	November 14, 2006	San Diego Studio	North America only	
B-Boy	PlayStation 2	September 29, 2006	Ubisoft Leamington		
B-Boy	PlayStation Portable	September 29, 2006	Ubisoft Leamington		
Shinobido: Tales of the Ninja	PlayStation Portable	October 26, 2006	Acquire	PAL only	
Killzone: Liberation	PlayStation Portable	October 31, 2006	Guerrilla Games		
SOCOM U.S. Navy SEALs: Combined Assault	PlayStation 2	November 7, 2006	Zipper Interactive		
Blast Factor	PlayStation 3	November 11, 2006	Bluepoint Games		
Genji: Days of the Blade	PlayStation 3	November 11, 2006	Game Republic / Japan Studio		
Resistance: Fall of Man	PlayStation 3	November 11, 2006	Insomniac Games		
Untold Legends: Dark Kingdom	PlayStation 3	November 17, 2006	Sony Online Entertainment	Published by Sony Online Entertainment	
SOCOM U.S. Navy SEALs: Fireteam Bravo 2	PlayStation Portable	November 21, 2006	Zipper Interactive		
Jeanne d'Arc	PlayStation Portable	November 22, 2006	Level-5 / Japan Studio	Japan and North America only	
Ape Escape Racing	PlayStation Portable	December 7, 2006	Epics / Japan Studio		
MotorStorm	PlayStation 3	December 14, 2006	Evolution Studios		
Wild Arms 5	PlayStation 2	December 14, 2006	Media.Vision / Japan Studio	Japan only	
Gran Turismo HD Concept	PlayStation 3	December 24, 2006	Polyphony Digital		
Formula One Championship Edition	PlayStation 3	December 28, 2006	Studio Liverpool		
Buzz!: The Hollywood Quiz	PlayStation 2	2007	Relentless Software		
Buzz! The Mega Quiz	PlayStation 2	2007	Relentless Software		
Buzz! Junior: Monster Rumble	PlayStation 2	2007	FreeStyleGames / Magenta Software		
Buzz! Junior: Robo Jam	PlayStation 2	2007	FreeStyleGames / Magenta Software		
EyeToy Astro Zoo	PlayStation 2	2007	London Studio	PAL only	
Gaelic Games: Football 2	PlayStation 2	2007	Transmission Games	PAL only	
Gaelic Games: Hurling	PlayStation 2	2007	Transmission Games	PAL only	
SingStar '90s	PlayStation 2	2007	London Studio		
SingStar Amped	PlayStation 2	2007	London Studio	North America and Australia only	
SingStar Pop Hits 2	PlayStation 2	2007	London Studio	PAL only	
SingStar Rock Ballads	PlayStation 2	2007	London Studio	PAL only	
SingStar R&B	PlayStation 2	2007	London Studio	PAL only	
Ridge Racer 7	PlayStation 3	2007	Bandai Namco Studios	Co-published with Namco in PAL only	
SingStar	PlayStation 3	2007	London Studio		
Aqua Vita	PlayStation 3	2007	London Studio	North America and PAL only	
High Stakes on the Vegas Strip: Poker Edition	PlayStation 3	2007	Coresoft	Published by Sony Online Entertainment in North America and PAL only	
Mesmerize Distort	PlayStation 3	2007	London Studio / Playlogic	North America and PAL only	
Mesmerize Trace	PlayStation 3	2007	London Studio / Playlogic	North America and PAL only	
Nucleus	PlayStation 3	2007	Kuju Entertainment		
Operation Creature Feature	PlayStation 3	2007	London Studio / Playlogic	(North America and PAL only)	
PixelJunk Racers	PlayStation 3	2007	Q-Games	North America and PAL only	
Snakeball	PlayStation 3	2007	Gamoola Soft / Ravn Studio		
Tekken 5: Dark Resurrection	PlayStation 3	2007	Namco	Co-published with Namco Bandai Games in PAL only	
The Trials of Topoq	PlayStation 3	2007	London Studio		
Tori-Emaki	PlayStation 3	2007	London Studio		
Rezel Cross	PlayStation Portable	2007		Japan only	
Smash Court Tennis 3	PlayStation Portable	2007		Co-published with Namco in PAL only	
Beats	PlayStation Portable	2007	London Studio		
Ratchet & Clank: Size Matters	PlayStation Portable	February 13, 2007	High Impact Games		
Ratchet & Clank: Size Matters	PlayStation 2	March 11, 2008	High Impact Games		
Kikou Souhei Armodyne	PlayStation 2	February 22, 2007	Omiya Soft / Japan Studio	Japan only	
MLB 07: The Show	PlayStation 2	February 27, 2007	San Diego Studio	North America and Korea only	
MLB 07: The Show	PlayStation Portable	February 27, 2007	San Diego Studio	North America and Korea only	
MLB 07: The Show	PlayStation 3	May 15, 2007	San Diego Studio	North America and Korea only	
God of War II	PlayStation 2	March 13, 2007	Santa Monica Studio	North America and PAL only	
Super Rub 'a' Dub	PlayStation 3	April 6, 2007	Sumo Digital		
Calling All Cars!	PlayStation 3	May 10, 2007	Incognito Entertainment		
Folklore	PlayStation 3	June 21, 2007	Game Republic / Japan Studio		
Piyotama	PlayStation 3	June 22, 2007	Japan Studio		
Piyotama	PlayStation Portable	July 27, 2010	Japan Studio		
Super Stardust HD	PlayStation 3	June 28, 2007	Housemarque		
Boku no Natsuyasumi 3	PlayStation 3	July 5, 2007	Millennium Kitchen / Japan Studio	Japan only	
Everybody's Golf 5	PlayStation 3	July 26, 2007	Clap Hanz / Japan Studio		
Saru! Get You! SaruSaru Big Mission	PlayStation Portable	July 26, 2007	h.a.n.d. / Japan Studio	Japan only	
Wild Arms XF	PlayStation Portable	August 9, 2007	Media.Vision / Japan Studio	Japan only	
Warhawk	PlayStation 3	August 28, 2007	Incognito Entertainment		
Lair	PlayStation 3	August 31, 2007	Factor 5		
Heavenly Sword	PlayStation 3	September 12, 2007	Ninja Theory		
LocoRoco Cocoreccho!	PlayStation 3	September 20, 2007	Japan Studio		
NBA 08	PlayStation 2	September 25, 2007	San Diego Studio		
NBA 08	PlayStation 3	September 25, 2007	San Diego Studio		
NBA 08	PlayStation Portable	September 25, 2007	San Diego Studio		
Go! Sports Ski	PlayStation 3	September 28, 2007	Yuke's / Japan Studio		
Syphon Filter: Logan's Shadow	PlayStation Portable	October 2, 2007	Bend Studio		
Syphon Filter: Logan's Shadow	PlayStation 2	June 2, 2010	Bend Studio	North America only	
Everyday Shooter	PlayStation 3	October 11, 2007	Queasy Games		
Everyday Shooter	PlayStation Portable	December 4, 2008	Queasy Games		
Ratchet & Clank Future: Tools of Destruction	PlayStation 3	October 23, 2007	Insomniac Games		
The Eye of Judgment	PlayStation 3	October 23, 2007	Japan Studio		
Toy Home	PlayStation 3	November 1, 2007	Game Republic / Japan Studio		
SOCOM U.S. Navy SEALs: Tactical Strike	PlayStation Portable	November 6, 2007	Slant Six Games		
Dark Mist	PlayStation 3	November 8, 2007	Game Republic / Japan Studio		
Uncharted: Drake's Fortune	PlayStation 3	November 19, 2007	Naughty Dog		
Uncharted: Drake's Fortune	PlayStation 4	November 18, 2016	Bluepoint Games	Retail version in PAL, download only in North America	
Go! Puzzle	PlayStation 3	November 20, 2007	Zoonami / Cohort Studios		
Go! Puzzle	PlayStation Portable	November 20, 2007	Zoonami / Cohort Studios		
Syphon Filter: Combat Ops	PlayStation Portable	November 20, 2007	Bend Studio		
Pain	PlayStation 3	November 29, 2007	Idol Minds / San Diego Studio	Retail version in PAL only	
Everybody's Golf Portable 2	PlayStation Portable	December 6, 2007	Clap Hanz / Japan Studio		
High Velocity Bowling	PlayStation 3	December 6, 2007	San Diego Studio		
What Did I Do to Deserve This, My Lord?	PlayStation Portable	December 6, 2007	Acquire / Japan Studio		
Pursuit Force: Extreme Justice	PlayStation Portable	December 7, 2007	Bigbig Studios	PAL and North America only	
Gran Turismo 5 Prologue	PlayStation 3	December 13, 2007	Polyphony Digital		
Wipeout Pulse	PlayStation Portable	December 13, 2007	Studio Liverpool		
Wipeout Pulse	PlayStation 2	June 24, 2009	Spiral House	PAL only	
Patapon	PlayStation Portable	December 20, 2007	Japan Studio / Pyramid		
Patapon	PlayStation 4	August 1, 2017	Japan Studio / Pyramid		
Buzz!: The Pop Quiz	PlayStation 2	2008	Relentless Software		
Buzz!: The Schools Quiz	PlayStation 2	2008	Relentless Software		
Buzz! Junior: Ace Racers	PlayStation 2	2008	Cohort Studios	PAL only	
Buzz! Junior: Dino Den	PlayStation 2	2008	Cohort Studios	PAL only	
EyeToy Play: Hero	PlayStation 2	2008	London Studio	PAL only	
EyeToy Play: PomPom Party	PlayStation 2	2008	London Studio	PAL only	
SingStar BoyBands vs GirlBands	PlayStation 2	2008	London Studio		
SingStar Country	PlayStation 2	2008	London Studio	North America only	
SingStar Hottest Hits	PlayStation 2	2008	London Studio	Australia only	
SingStar Party Hits	PlayStation 2	2008	London Studio	Australia only	
SingStar Pop Vol. 2	PlayStation 2	2008	London Studio	North America only	
SingStar Singalong with Disney	PlayStation 2	2008	London Studio	PAL only	
SingStar Summer Party	PlayStation 2	2008	London Studio	PAL only	
Buzz!: Quiz TV	PlayStation 3	2008	Relentless Software		
SingStar Vol. 2	PlayStation 3	2008	London Studio		
SingStar Vol. 3	PlayStation 3	2008	London Studio		
Time Crisis 4	PlayStation 3	2008	Nex Entertainment	Co-published with Namco in PAL only	
Buzz! Junior: Jungle Party	PlayStation 3	2008	Cohort Studios	PAL and North America only	
Elefunk	PlayStation 3	2008	8bit Games		
Linger in Shadows	PlayStation 3	2008	Plastic		
PixelJunk Eden	PlayStation 3	2008	Q-Games	North America and PAL only	
PixelJunk Monsters	PlayStation 3	2008	Q-Games	North America and PAL only	
Buzz!: Brain Bender	PlayStation Portable	2008	Curve Studios	PAL only	
Buzz!: Master Quiz	PlayStation Portable	2008	Relentless Software / Curve Studios		
Brain Challenge	PlayStation Portable	2008	Gameloft	North America only	
Mainichi Issho Portable	PlayStation Portable	2008		Japan only	
Ape Quest	PlayStation Portable	January 10, 2008	Shift / Japan Studio	Retail version in Japan only	
Go! Sports Skydiving	PlayStation 3	January 10, 2008	Lightweight / Japan Studio		
Twisted Metal: Head-On: Extra Twisted Edition	PlayStation 2	February 5, 2008	Eat Sleep Play	North America only	
Coded Soul	PlayStation Portable	February 7, 2008	Gaia / Japan Studio	Japan and South Korea only	
God of War: Chains of Olympus	PlayStation Portable	March 4, 2008	Ready at Dawn	North America and PAL only	
MLB 08: The Show	PlayStation 2	March 4, 2008	San Diego Studio	North America only	
MLB 08: The Show	PlayStation 3	March 4, 2008	San Diego Studio	North America only	
MLB 08: The Show	PlayStation Portable	March 4, 2008	San Diego Studio	North America only	
Echochrome	PlayStation Portable	March 19, 2008	Will / Japan Studio		
Echochrome	PlayStation 3	May 1, 2008	Will / Japan Studio		
Secret Agent Clank	PlayStation Portable	June 17, 2008	High Impact Games		
Secret Agent Clank	PlayStation 2	May 26, 2009	Sanzaru Games	North America and PAL only	
Siren: Blood Curse	PlayStation 3	July 24, 2008	Japan Studio (Team Gravity)	Retail version in PAL only	
The Last Guy	PlayStation 3	July 31, 2008	Japan Studio		
Ratchet & Clank Future: Quest for Booty	PlayStation 3	August 21, 2008	Insomniac Games	Retail version in PAL only	
Afrika	PlayStation 3	August 28, 2008	Rhino Studios / Japan Studio	Japan only	
Aquanaut's Holiday: Hidden Memories	PlayStation 3	September 25, 2008	Artdink / Japan Studio	Japan only	
Wipeout HD	PlayStation 3	September 25, 2008	Studio Liverpool		
NBA 09: The Inside	PlayStation 2	October 7, 2008	San Diego Studio	North America only	
NBA 09: The Inside	PlayStation 3	October 7, 2008	San Diego Studio	North America only	
NBA 09: The Inside	PlayStation Portable	October 7, 2008	San Diego Studio	North America only	
SOCOM U.S. Navy SEALs: Confrontation	PlayStation 3	October 14, 2008	Slant Six Games		
What Did I Do to Deserve This, My Lord? 2	PlayStation Portable	October 16, 2008	Acquire / Japan Studio		
LittleBigPlanet	PlayStation 3	October 27, 2008	Media Molecule		
MotorStorm: Pacific Rift	PlayStation 3	October 28, 2008	Evolution Studios		
Resistance 2	PlayStation 3	November 4, 2008	Insomniac Games		
SingStar ABBA	PlayStation 2	November 14, 2008	London Studio		
SingStar ABBA	PlayStation 3	November 14, 2008	London Studio		
LocoRoco 2	PlayStation Portable	November 21, 2008	Japan Studio		
LocoRoco 2	PlayStation 4	December 9, 2017	Japan Studio		
Super Stardust Portable	PlayStation Portable	November 25, 2008	Housemarque		
Patapon 2	PlayStation Portable	November 27, 2008	Japan Studio / Pyramid		
Patapon 2	PlayStation 4	January 30, 2020	Japan Studio / Pyramid		
PlayStation Home	PlayStation 3	December 11, 2008	London Studio		
Crash Commando	PlayStation 3	December 18, 2008	EPOS Game Studios		
White Knight Chronicles	PlayStation 3	December 25, 2008	Level-5 / Japan Studio		
SingStar Latino	PlayStation 3	2009	London Studio	North America only	
SingStar Motown	PlayStation 3	2009	London Studio	PAL only	
SingStar Queen	PlayStation 3	2009	London Studio		
SingStar Pop Edition	PlayStation 3	2009	London Studio	PAL only	
SingStar Starter Pack	PlayStation 3	2009	London Studio	PAL only	
SingStar Take That	PlayStation 3	2009	London Studio	UK only	
SingStar Vasco	PlayStation 3	2009	London Studio	Italy only	
.detuned	PlayStation 3	2009	Farbrausch		
Bejeweled 2	PlayStation 3	2009	PopCap Games	Published by Sony Online Entertainment in North America and PAL only	
Buzz! Junior: Dino Den	PlayStation 3	2009	Cohort Studios	PAL only	
Buzz! Junior: Monster Rumble	PlayStation 3	2009	Cohort Studios	PAL and North America only	
Buzz! Junior: Robo Jam	PlayStation 3	2009	Cohort Studios	PAL and North America only	
Dress	PlayStation 3	2009		Japan only	
Heavy Weapon	PlayStation 3	2009	PopCap Games	Published by Sony Online Entertainment in North America and PAL only	
Magic Orbz	PlayStation 3	2009	Creat Studios	North America only	
Peggle	PlayStation 3	2009	PopCap Games	Published by Sony Online Entertainment in North America and PAL only	
Peggle Nights	PlayStation 3	2009	PopCap Games	Published by Sony Online Entertainment in North America and PAL only	
PixelJunk Shooter	PlayStation 3	2009	Q-Games	North America and PAL only	
Revenge of the Wounded Dragons	PlayStation 3	2009	Behaviour Interactive (Behaviour Santiago)	North America only	
Savage Moon	PlayStation 3	2009	FluffyLogic		
Switchball	PlayStation 3	2009	Atomic Elbow	Published by Sony Online Entertainment in North America and PAL only	
Zuma	PlayStation 3	2009	PopCap Games	Published by Sony Online Entertainment in North America and PAL only	
Cart Kings	PlayStation 2	2009	GameShastra	India only	
Chandragupta: Warrior Prince	PlayStation 2	2009	Immersive Games	India only	
Desi Adda: Games of India	PlayStation 2	2009	Gameshastra	India only	
Hanuman: Boy Warrior	PlayStation 2	2009	Aurona Technologies	India only	
SingStar Latino	PlayStation 2	2009	London Studio	North America only	
SingStar Motown	PlayStation 2	2009	London Studio		
SingStar Queen	PlayStation 2	2009	London Studio		
SingStar Take That	PlayStation 2	2009	London Studio	UK only	
SingStar Vasco	PlayStation 2	2009	London Studio	Italy only	
Chandrugpta: Warrior Prince	PlayStation Portable	2009		India only	
Desi Adda: Games of India	PlayStation Portable	2009	Gameshastra	India only	
Enkaku Sōsa: Shinjitsu e no 23 Nichikan	PlayStation Portable	2009	Media.Vision / Japan Studio		
PixelJunk Monsters Deluxe	PlayStation Portable	2009	Q-Games	North America and PAL only	
Savage Moon The Hera Campaign	PlayStation Portable	2009			
Demon's Souls	PlayStation 3	February 5, 2009	FromSoftware / Japan Studio	Japan only	
Flower	PlayStation 3	February 12, 2009	Thatgamecompany	PSN	
Flower	PlayStation Vita	November 12, 2013	Bluepoint Games	PSN	
Flower	PlayStation 4	November 15, 2013	Bluepoint Games	PSN	
Killzone 2	PlayStation 3	February 26, 2009	Guerrilla Games		
MLB 09: The Show	PlayStation 2	March 3, 2009	San Diego Studio	North America only	
MLB 09: The Show	PlayStation 3	March 3, 2009	San Diego Studio	North America only	
MLB 09: The Show	PlayStation Portable	March 3, 2009	San Diego Studio	North America only	
Resistance: Retribution	PlayStation Portable	March 17, 2009	Bend Studio		
Trash Panic	PlayStation 3	March 19, 2009	Japan Studio		
Buzz!: Brain of the World	PlayStation 2	March 26, 2009	Relentless Software		
Buzz!: Brain of the World	PlayStation 3	March 26, 2009	Relentless Software		
Buzz!: Brain of the World	PlayStation Portable	March 26, 2009	Relentless Software		
Worms	PlayStation 3	March 26, 2009	Team17		
Rag Doll Kung Fu: Fists of Plastic	PlayStation 3	April 9, 2009	Tarsier Studios		
Infamous	PlayStation 3	May 26, 2009	Sucker Punch Productions		
Ghostbusters: The Video Game	PlayStation 2	June 16, 2009	Terminal Reality	PAL only	
Ghostbusters: The Video Game	PlayStation 3	June 16, 2009	Red Fly Studio	PAL only	
Ghostbusters: The Video Game	PlayStation Portable	October 30, 2009	Red Fly Studio	PAL only	
Numblast	PlayStation 3	June 18, 2009	Japan Studio	PSN	
Numblast	PlayStation Portable	June 18, 2009	Japan Studio	PSN	
Boku no Natsuyasumi 4	PlayStation Portable	July 2, 2009	Millennium Kitchen / Japan Studio	Japan only	
The Punisher: No Mercy	PlayStation 3	July 2, 2009	Zen Studios		
Toro to Morimori	PlayStation 3	July 23, 2009	Japan Studio		
Wipeout HD Fury	PlayStation 3	July 23, 2009	Studio Liverpool	PAL only	
Fat Princess	PlayStation 3	July 30, 2009	Titan Studios		
MotorStorm: Arctic Edge	PlayStation Portable	September 17, 2009	Bigbig Studios		
MotorStorm: Arctic Edge	PlayStation 2	October 3, 2009	Virtuos		
Everybody's Stress Buster	PlayStation Portable	October 1, 2009	Clap Hanz / Japan Studio	Retail version in Japan and Asia only	
Gran Turismo	PlayStation Portable	October 1, 2009	Polyphony Digital		
NBA 10: The Inside	PlayStation Portable	October 6, 2009	San Diego Studio	North America only	
Uncharted 2: Among Thieves	PlayStation 3	October 13, 2009	Naughty Dog		
Uncharted 2: Among Thieves	PlayStation 4	November 18, 2016	Bluepoint Games	Retail version in PAL, download only in North America	
EyePet	PlayStation 3	October 23, 2009	London Studio	PAL only	
EyePet	PlayStation Portable	November 2, 2010	London Studio		
Ratchet & Clank Future: A Crack in Time	PlayStation 3	October 27, 2009	Insomniac Games		
LocoRoco Midnight Carnival	PlayStation Portable	October 29, 2009	Japan Studio		
Buzz!: Quiz World	PlayStation 3	October 30, 2009	Relentless Software		
Buzz!: Quiz World	PlayStation Portable	December 17, 2009	Curve Games		
Echoshift	PlayStation Portable	November 1, 2009	Artoon / Japan Studio	Retail version in Japan and PAL only	
Jak and Daxter: The Lost Frontier	PlayStation 2	November 3, 2009	High Impact Games	North America and PAL only	
Jak and Daxter: The Lost Frontier	PlayStation Portable	November 3, 2009	High Impact Games	North America and PAL only	
Invizimals	PlayStation Portable	November 13, 2009	Novarama	PAL and North America only	
Pinball Heroes	PlayStation Portable	November 13, 2009	San Diego Studio		
God of War Collection	PlayStation 3	November 17, 2009	Bluepoint Games		
God of War Collection	PlayStation Vita	May 6, 2014	Sanzaru Games		
LittleBigPlanet	PlayStation Portable	November 17, 2009	Guerrilla Cambridge		
Gravity Crash	PlayStation 3	November 24, 2009	Just Add Water		
Gravity Crash	PlayStation Portable	July 20, 2010	Just Add Water		
Gravity Crash	PlayStation Vita	August 12, 2014	Just Add Water		
Hustle Kings	PlayStation 3	December 22, 2009	VooFoo Studios	PSN	
Hustle Kings	PlayStation Vita	February 22, 2012	XDev	PSN	
Hustle Kings	PlayStation 4	March 18, 2015	XDev	PSN	
SingStar Chart Hits	PlayStation 2	2010	London Studio	Australia Only	
SingStar Wiggles	PlayStation 2	2010	London Studio	Australia only	
Street Cricket Champions	PlayStation 2	2010	Trine Games	India only	
Beat Sketcher	PlayStation 3	2010			
Buzz!: The Ultimate Music Quiz	PlayStation 3	2010	Relentless Software	PAL only	
Heavy Rain Move Edition	PlayStation 3	2010	Quantic Dream		
Jungle Party	PlayStation Portable	2010	Magenta Software		
Patito Feo: el juego màs bonito	PlayStation Portable	2010		PAL only: Spain, Portugal and Italy	
Street Cricket Champions	PlayStation Portable	2010		India only	
Pinball Heroes Bundle 2	PlayStation Portable	2010			
SingStar Chart Hits	PlayStation 3	2010	London Studio	Australia only	
SingStar Dance	PlayStation 3	2010	London Studio		
Start the Party!	PlayStation 3	2010	Supermassive Games		
The Fight: Lights Out	PlayStation 3	2010	ColdWood Interactive		
The Shoot	PlayStation 3	2010	Cohort Studios		
Time Crisis: Razing Storm	PlayStation 3	2010	Nex Entertainment	Co-published with Bandai Namco Entertainment in PAL only	
Buzz!: Quiz Player	PlayStation 3	2010	Relentless Software	PAL only, free-to-play version	
Eat Them!	PlayStation 3	2010	FluffyLogic		
Feeding Frenzy 2: Shipwreck Showdown	PlayStation 3	2010	PopCap Games	Published by Sony Online Entertainment in North America and PAL only	
MotorStorm 3D Rift	PlayStation 3	2010	Evolution Studios		
PixelJunk Racers: 2nd Lap	PlayStation 3	2010	Q-Games	North America and PAL only	
Qlione Evolve	PlayStation 3	2010	Sony Online Entertainment	Published by Sony Online Entertainment in North America and PAL only	
SingStar Viewer	PlayStation 3	2010	London Studio		
Swords & Soldiers	PlayStation 3	2010	Ronimo Games	Published by Sony Online Entertainment in North America and PAL only	
TerRover	PlayStation 3	2010		Published by Sony Online Entertainment in North America and PAL only	
Tumble	PlayStation 3	2010	Supermassive Games		
MAG	PlayStation 3	January 26, 2010	Zipper Interactive		
SOCOM U.S. Navy SEALs: Fireteam Bravo 3	PlayStation Portable	February 11, 2010	Slant Six Games		
This Is Football Management	PlayStation 3	February 11, 2010	Sports Director Limited		
This Is Football Management	PlayStation Portable	February 11, 2010	Sports Director Limited		
This Is Football Management	PlayStation Vita	February 22, 2012	Sports Director Limited		
Patchwork Heroes	PlayStation Portable	February 18, 2010	Acquire / Japan Studio	Retail version in Japan only	
Heavy Rain	PlayStation 3	February 23, 2010	Quantic Dream		
Heavy Rain	PlayStation 4	March 1, 2016	Quantic Dream	PSN	
Everybody's Tennis Portable	PlayStation Portable	February 25, 2010	Clap Hanz / Japan Studio		
MLB 10: The Show	PlayStation 2	March 2, 2010	San Diego Studio	North America only	
MLB 10: The Show	PlayStation 3	March 2, 2010	San Diego Studio	North America only	
MLB 10: The Show	PlayStation Portable	March 2, 2010	San Diego Studio	North America only	
The Eye of Judgment: Legends	PlayStation Portable	March 4, 2010	Japan Studio	Retail version in Japan and PAL only	
Fat Princess: Fistful of Cake	PlayStation Portable	March 11, 2010	Titan Studios	PAL and North America only	
No Heroes Allowed!	PlayStation Portable	March 11, 2010	Acquire / Japan Studio	Retail version in Japan only	
God of War III	PlayStation 3	March 16, 2010	Santa Monica Studio		
God of War III	PlayStation 4	July 14, 2015	Wholesale Algorithms		
ModNation Racers	PlayStation Portable	May 19, 2010	San Diego Studio		
ModNation Racers	PlayStation 3	May 20, 2010	United Front Games		
White Knight Chronicles II	PlayStation 3	July 8, 2010	Level-5 / Japan Studio		
EyePet Move Edition	PlayStation 3	September 5, 2010	London Studio		
Kung Fu Rider	PlayStation 3	September 7, 2010	Japan Studio		
High Velocity Bowling Move Edition	PlayStation 3	September 21, 2010	San Diego Studio	North America and Japan only	
Sports Champions	PlayStation 3	September 15, 2010	Zindagi Games / San Diego Studio		
Malicious	PlayStation 3	October 10, 2010	Alvion	PSN Published by Sony Interactive Entertainment outside Japan	
Malicious	PlayStation Vita	November 22, 2012	Alvion	PSN Published by Sony Interactive Entertainment outside Japan	
Malicious	PlayStation 4	February 10, 2017	Alvion	PSN Published by Sony Interactive Entertainment outside Japan	
TV Superstars	PlayStation 3	October 13, 2010	Guerrilla Cambridge		
God of War: Ghost of Sparta	PlayStation Portable	November 2, 2010	Ready at Dawn		
SingStar Guitar	PlayStation 3	November 9, 2010	London Studio	PAL only	
The Sly Collection	PlayStation 3	November 9, 2010	Sanzaru Games		
The Sly Collection	PlayStation Vita	April 27, 2014	Sanzaru Games		
Invizimals: Shadow Zone	PlayStation Portable	November 12, 2010	Novarama	PAL and North America only	
Gran Turismo 5	PlayStation 3	November 24, 2010	Polyphony Digital		
Dead Nation	PlayStation 3	November 30, 2010	Housemarque	PSN	
Dead Nation	PlayStation 4	March 4, 2014	Climax Studios	PSN	
Dead Nation	PlayStation Vita	April 15, 2014	Climax Studios	PSN	
PlayStation Move Ape Escape	PlayStation 3	December 9, 2010	Japan Studio	Retail version in Japan, Asia and PAL, only download in North America and UK	
Sackboy's Prehistoric Moves	PlayStation 3	December 14, 2010	Supermassive Games / XDev		
Echochrome II	PlayStation 3	December 21, 2010	Japan Studio		
Top Darts	PlayStation 3	December 21, 2010	Devil's Details		
Top Darts	PlayStation Vita	February 22, 2012	Devil's Details		
Everybody Dance	PlayStation 3	2011	London Studio	PAL and North America only	
EyePet & Friends	PlayStation 3	2011	London Studio		
Move Fitness	PlayStation 3	2011		Retail version in PAL, Asia and Korea, only download in North America	
SingStar Back to the '80s	PlayStation 3	2011	London Studio	PAL only	
Start the Party! Save the World	PlayStation 3	2011	Supermassive Games	Retail version in PAL and Asia only	
Tekken Hybrid	PlayStation 3	2011	Bandai Namco Studios	Co-published with Namco Bandai Games in PAL only	
Acceleration of Suguri X Edition	PlayStation 3	2011	Orange Juice	Published by Sony Online Entertainment	
Akimi Village	PlayStation 3	2011	NinjaBee	Published by Sony Online Entertainment in North America and PAL only	
Free Realms	PlayStation 3	2011	Sony Online Entertainment	Published by Sony Online Entertainment in North and PAL only	
Payday: The Heist	PlayStation 3	2011	Overkill Software	Published by Sony Online Entertainment in North America and PAL only	
PixelJunk Shooter 2	PlayStation 3	2011	Q-Games	North America and PAL only	
PixelJunk SideScroller	PlayStation 3	2011	Q-Games	North America and PAL only	
Plants vs. Zombies	PlayStation 3	2011	PopCap Games	Published by Sony Online Entertainment in North America and PAL only	
RA. ONE: The Game	PlayStation 3	2011	Red Chillies Entertainment	PAL only, retail version in India only	
Rochard	PlayStation 3	2011	Recoil Games	Published by Sony Online Entertainment in North America and PAL only	
Sideway New York	PlayStation 3	2011	Playbrains	Published by Sony Online Entertainment in North America and PAL only	
Slam Bolt Scrappers	PlayStation 3	2011	Fire Hose Games	Published by Sony Online Entertainment in North America and PAL only	
Chandragupta: Warrior Prince	PlayStation 2	2011		India only	
RA. ONE: The Game	PlayStation 2	2011	Red Chillies Entertainment	India only	
Buzz!: The Ultimate Music Quiz	PlayStation Portable	2011	Relentless Software	PAL only	
Disney•Pixar Cars 2	PlayStation Portable	2011	Virtual Toys	PAL and North America only	
Cart Kings	PlayStation Portable	2011		India only	
EyePet Adventures	PlayStation Portable	2011		PAL only	
Geronimo Stilton in The Kingdom of Fantasy The Videogame	PlayStation Portable	2011		Retail version in PAL, download only in North America	
The Mystery Team	PlayStation Portable	2011		PAL only	
DC Universe Online	PlayStation 3	January 11, 2011	Sony Online Entertainment	Published by Sony Online Entertainment	
DC Universe Online	PlayStation 4	November 15, 2013	Sony Online Entertainment	Published by Sony Online Entertainment	
LittleBigPlanet 2	PlayStation 3	January 18, 2011	Media Molecule		
White Knight Chronicles: Origins	PlayStation Portable	February 3, 2011	Matrix Software / Japan Studio	Japan and PAL only	
Killzone 3	PlayStation 3	February 22, 2011	Guerrilla Games		
MLB 11: The Show	PlayStation 2	March 8, 2011	San Diego Studio	North America only	
MLB 11: The Show	PlayStation 3	March 8, 2011	San Diego Studio	North America only	
MLB 11: The Show	PlayStation Portable	March 8, 2011	San Diego Studio	North America only	
MotorStorm: Apocalypse	PlayStation 3	March 17, 2011	Evolution Studios	PAL and North America only	
PlayStation Move Heroes	PlayStation 3	March 22, 2011	nStigate Games		
Patapon 3	PlayStation Portable	April 12, 2011	Japan Studio / Pyramid		
SOCOM 4 U.S. Navy SEALs	PlayStation 3	April 19, 2011	Zipper Interactive		
Infamous 2	PlayStation 3	June 7, 2011	Sucker Punch Productions		
Bleach: Soul Resurrecciòn	PlayStation 3	June 23, 2011	Racjin / Japan Studio	Japan only	
Resistance 3	PlayStation 3	September 6, 2011	Insomniac Games		
God of War: Origins Collection	PlayStation 3	September 13, 2011	Ready at Dawn		
The Ico & Shadow of the Colossus Collection	PlayStation 3	September 22, 2011	Bluepoint Games / Japan Studio (Team Ico)		
Ratchet & Clank: All 4 One	PlayStation 3	October 18, 2011	Insomniac Games		
Infamous: Festival of Blood	PlayStation 3	October 25, 2011	Sucker Punch Productions		
Uncharted 3: Drake's Deception	PlayStation 3	November 1, 2011	Naughty Dog		
Uncharted 3: Drake's Deception	PlayStation 4	November 18, 2016	Bluepoint Games	Retail version in PAL, download only in North America	
Invizimals: The Lost Tribes	PlayStation Portable	November 4, 2011	Novarama	Retail version in PAL, download only in North America	
Carnival Island	PlayStation 3	November 15, 2011	Magic Pixel Games		
Medieval Moves: Deadmund's Quest	PlayStation 3	November 15, 2011	Zindagi Games / San Diego Studio		
Everybody's Golf 6	PlayStation Vita	December 17, 2011	Clap Hanz / Japan Studio		
Everybody's Golf 6	PlayStation 3	November 22, 2012	Clap Hanz / Japan Studio		
Little Deviants	PlayStation Vita	December 17, 2011	Bigbig Studios		
Uncharted: Golden Abyss	PlayStation Vita	December 17, 2011	Bend Studio		
Toro's Friend Network	PlayStation Vita	December 17, 2011			
Street Cricket Champions 2	PlayStation 2	2012	Trine Games	India only	
Everybody Dance 2	PlayStation 3	2012	London Studio	PAL only	
God of War Saga	PlayStation 3	2012	Santa Monica Studio / Ready at Dawn / Bluepoint Games	North America only	
Killzone Trilogy	PlayStation 3	2012	Guerrilla Games		
Wonderbook: Book of Spells	PlayStation 3	2012	London Studio	PAL and North America only	
Datura	PlayStation 3	2012	Plastic		
Move Street Cricket	PlayStation 3	2012	Trine Games	PAL only, retail version in India only	
PixelJunk 4am	PlayStation 3	2012	Q-Games	North America and PAL only	
Geronimo Stilton: Return to The Kingdom of Fantasy The Videogame	PlayStation Portable	2012		Retail version in PAL, download only in North America	
Phineas and Ferb: Across the 2nd Dimension	PlayStation Portable	2012		PAL and North America only	
Street Cricket Champions 2	PlayStation Portable	2012		India only	
Cliff Diving	PlayStation Vita	2012			
Ecolibrium	PlayStation Vita	2012	StormBASIC		
Fireworks	PlayStation Vita	2012			
Paint Park	PlayStation Vita	2012			
Plants vs. Zombies	PlayStation Vita	2012	PopCap Games	Published by Sony Online Entertainment in North America and PAL only	
PulzAR	PlayStation Vita	2012			
t@g	PlayStation Vita	2012			
Table Football	PlayStation Vita	2012			
Table Ice Hockey	PlayStation Vita	2012			
Table Top Tanks	PlayStation Vita	2012			
Travel Bug	PlayStation Vita	2012			
Treasure Park	PlayStation Vita	2012			
Wipeout 2048	PlayStation Vita	January 19, 2012	Studio Liverpool		
Jak and Daxter Collection	PlayStation 3	February 7, 2012	Mass Media		
Jak and Daxter Collection	PlayStation Vita	June 18, 2013	Mass Media		
Gravity Rush	PlayStation Vita	February 9, 2012	Japan Studio (Team Gravity)		
Gravity Rush	PlayStation 4	December 10, 2015	Bluepoint Games / Japan Studio (Team Gravity)		
Escape Plan	PlayStation Vita	February 14, 2012	Fun Bits		
Escape Plan	PlayStation 4	November 29, 2013	Wholesale Algorithms		
Twisted Metal	PlayStation 3	February 14, 2012	Eat Sleep Play		
ModNation Racers: Road Trip	PlayStation Vita	February 15, 2012	San Diego Studio		
Super Stardust Delta	PlayStation Vita	February 15, 2012	Housemarque		
Frobisher Says!	PlayStation Vita	February 22, 2012	Honeyslug		
MotorStorm: RC	PlayStation 3	February 22, 2012	Evolution Studios		
MotorStorm: RC	PlayStation Vita	February 22, 2012	Evolution Studios		
Reality Fighters	PlayStation Vita	February 22, 2012	Novarama		
MLB 12: The Show	PlayStation 3	March 6, 2012	San Diego Studio	North America only	
MLB 12: The Show	PlayStation Vita	March 6, 2012	San Diego Studio	North America only	
Unit 13	PlayStation Vita	March 6, 2012	Zipper Interactive		
Journey	PlayStation 3	March 13, 2012	Thatgamecompany	PSN	
Journey	PlayStation 4	July 21, 2015	Tricky Pixels	PSN	
Journey Collector's Edition	PlayStation 3	March 13, 2012	Thatgamecompany		
Journey Collector's Edition	PlayStation 4	September 29, 2015	Tricky Pixels		
Starhawk	PlayStation 3	May 8, 2012	LightBox Interactive		
Sorcery	PlayStation 3	May 22, 2012	The Workshop		
Resistance: Burning Skies	PlayStation Vita	May 29, 2012	nStigate Games		
Tokyo Jungle	PlayStation 3	June 7, 2012	Crispy's! / Japan Studio	Retail version in Japan only	
Ratchet & Clank Collection	PlayStation 3	June 27, 2012	Idol Minds		
Ratchet & Clank Collection	PlayStation Vita	July 29, 2014	Mass Media		
Sound Shapes	PlayStation 3	August 7, 2012	Queasy Games	PSN	
Sound Shapes	PlayStation Vita	August 7, 2012	Queasy Games	PSN	
Sound Shapes	PlayStation 4	November 15, 2013	Queasy Games	PSN	
LittleBigPlanet PS Vita	PlayStation Vita	September 19, 2012	Double Eleven / Tarsier Studios / XDev		
The Unfinished Swan	PlayStation 3	October 23, 2012	Giant Sparrow	PSN	
The Unfinished Swan	PlayStation 4	October 23, 2014	Armature Studio	PSN	
The Unfinished Swan	PlayStation Vita	October 23, 2014	Armature Studio	PSN	
Smart As...	PlayStation Vita	October 30, 2012	Climax Studios		
Sports Champions 2	PlayStation 3	October 30, 2012	Zindagi Games / San Diego Studio		
LittleBigPlanet Karting	PlayStation 3	November 6, 2012	United Front Games / San Diego Studio		
When Vikings Attack!	PlayStation 3	November 6, 2012	Clever Beans		
When Vikings Attack!	PlayStation Vita	November 6, 2012	Clever Beans		
PlayStation All-Stars Battle Royale	PlayStation 3	November 20, 2012	SuperBot Entertainment		
PlayStation All-Stars Battle Royale	PlayStation Vita	November 20, 2012	Bluepoint Games		
Ratchet & Clank: Full Frontal Assault	PlayStation 3	November 27, 2012	Insomniac Games		
Ratchet & Clank: Full Frontal Assault	PlayStation Vita	May 21, 2013	Tin Giant		
Uncharted: Fight for Fortune	PlayStation Vita	December 4, 2012	Bend Studio / One Loop Games		
Kite Fight	PlayStation 3	2013	Gameshastra	PAL only	
Move Street Cricket II	PlayStation 3	2013	Trine Games	PAL only, retail version in India only	
Pro Foosball	PlayStation 3	2013	Quirkat		
Knack's Quest	Android	2013	Japan Studio	Published under PlayStation Mobile	
Knack's Quest	iOS	2013	Japan Studio	Published under PlayStation Mobile	
Wonderbook: Book of Potions	PlayStation 3	2013	London Studio	PAL and North America only	
Wonderbook: Diggs Nightcrawler	PlayStation 3	2013	London Studio	PAL and North America only	
Wonderbook: Walking with Dinosaurs	PlayStation 3	2013	Supermassive Games	PAL and North America only	
Everybody Dance 3	PlayStation 3	2013	London Studio	Central America only	
Everybody Dance Digital	PlayStation 3	2013	London Studio	PAL only, free-to-play version	
Dare to Fly	PlayStation 3	2013		PAL only	
Dust 514	PlayStation 3	2013	CCP Games		
Ratchet & Clank: Before the Nexus	Android	2013	Darkside Game Studios	Published under PlayStation Mobile	
Ratchet & Clank: Before the Nexus	iOS	2013	Darkside Game Studios	Published under PlayStation Mobile	
Disney Epic Mickey 2: The Power of Two	PlayStation Vita	2013	Junction Point Studios	Retail version in PAL, download only in North America	
The Walking Dead: The Complete First Season	PlayStation Vita	2013	Telltale Games		
Jacob Jones and the Bigfoot Mystery	PlayStation Vita	2013			
Imaginstruments	PlayStation Vita	2013			
Open Me!	PlayStation Vita	2013			
Paint Park Plus	PlayStation Vita	2013			
PlayStation Home Arcade	PlayStation Vita	2013	London Studio		
Table Mini Golf	PlayStation Vita	2013			
Wake-up Club	PlayStation Vita	2013			
Bentley's Hackpack	PlayStation 3	February 5, 2013	Sanzaru Games		
Bentley's Hackpack	PlayStation Vita	February 5, 2013	Sanzaru Games		
Sly Cooper: Thieves in Time	PlayStation 3	February 5, 2013	Sanzaru Games		
Sly Cooper: Thieves in Time	PlayStation Vita	February 5, 2013	Sanzaru Games		
Rebel Raiders: Operation Nighthawk	PlayStation 3	February 12, 2013	Kando Games	North America only	
Don 2: The Game	PlayStation 2	February 15, 2013	Gameshastra		
Don 2: The Game	PlayStation Portable	February 15, 2013	Gameshastra		
MLB 13: The Show	PlayStation 3	March 5, 2013	San Diego Studio	Retail version in North America, Korea and Australia, download only in PAL	
MLB 13: The Show	PlayStation Vita	March 5, 2013	San Diego Studio	Retail version in North America, Korea and Australia, download only in PAL	
God of War: Ascension	PlayStation 3	March 12, 2013	Santa Monica Studio		
Soul Sacrifice	PlayStation Vita	March 7, 2013	Marvelous AQL / Japan Studio		
Ultimate Board Game Collection	PlayStation 3	June 4, 2013	Mere Mortals	PSN North America only	
The Last of Us	PlayStation 3	June 14, 2013	Naughty Dog		
The Last of Us	PlayStation 4	July 29, 2014	Naughty Dog		
Riding Star	PlayStation 3	June 25, 2013	Sproing Interactive Media	PSN North America only	
The Red Star	PlayStation 3	August 6, 2013	Iguana Entertainment	PSN North America only	
Killzone: Mercenary	PlayStation Vita	September 4, 2013	Guerrilla Cambridge		
Puppeteer	PlayStation 3	September 5, 2013	Japan Studio		
Rain	PlayStation 3	October 1, 2013	Acquire / Japan Studio	Retail version in Japan only	
Beyond: Two Souls	PlayStation 3	October 8, 2013	Quantic Dream		
Beyond: Two Souls	PlayStation 4	November 24, 2015	Quantic Dream	PSN	
Invizimals: The Alliance	PlayStation Vita	October 30, 2013	Novarama	Retail version in PAL, download only in North America	
Invizimals: The Lost Kingdom	PlayStation 3	October 30, 2013	Novarama / Magenta Software	Retail version in PAL only, download only in North America	
Ratchet & Clank: Into the Nexus	PlayStation 3	November 6, 2013	Insomniac Games		
Killzone: Shadow Fall	PlayStation 4	November 15, 2013	Guerrilla Games		
Knack	PlayStation 4	November 15, 2013	Japan Studio		
Resogun	PlayStation 4	November 15, 2013	Housemarque		
Resogun	PlayStation 3	December 17, 2014	Climax Studios	PSN	
Resogun	PlayStation Vita	December 17, 2014	Climax Studios	PSN	
The Playroom	PlayStation 4	November 15, 2013	Japan Studio (Team Asobi)		
Tearaway	PlayStation Vita	November 20, 2013	Media Molecule		
Doki-Doki Universe	PlayStation 3	December 2, 2013	HumaNature Studios		
Doki-Doki Universe	PlayStation 4	December 2, 2013	HumaNature Studios		
Doki-Doki Universe	PlayStation Vita	December 2, 2013	HumaNature Studios		
Gran Turismo 6	PlayStation 3	December 6, 2013	Polyphony Digital		
No Heroes Allowed: No Puzzles Either!	PlayStation Vita	December 12, 2013	Acquire / Japan Studio		
Minecraft	PlayStation 3	December 17, 2013	Mojang / 4J Studios	Licensed by Xbox Game Studios	
Minecraft	PlayStation 4	September 4, 2014	Mojang / 4J Studios	Licensed by Xbox Game Studios	
Minecraft	PlayStation Vita	October 14, 2014	Mojang / 4J Studios	Licensed by Xbox Game Studios	
Invizimals: Hidden Challenges	Android	2014		Published under PlayStation Mobile	
Invizimals: Hidden Challenges	iOS	2014		Published under PlayStation Mobile	
Invizimals: New Alliance	Android	2014		Published under PlayStation Mobile	
Invizimals: New Alliance	iOS	2014		Published under PlayStation Mobile	
Invizimals: Revolution	Android	2014		Published under PlayStation Mobile	
Invizimals: Revolution	iOS	2014		Published under PlayStation Mobile	
Minna no Golf Smart	Android	2014		Japan only	
Minna no Golf Smart	iOS	2014		Japan only	
Invizimals: Hidden Challenges	PlayStation Portable	January 29, 2014	Novarama	PAL only	
Invizimals: Hidden Challenges	PlayStation Vita	January 29, 2014	Novarama	PAL only	
The Last of Us: Left Behind	PlayStation 3	February 14, 2014	Naughty Dog	PSN	
The Last of Us: Left Behind	PlayStation 4	July 29, 2014	Naughty Dog	PSN	
Soul Sacrifice Delta	PlayStation Vita	March 6, 2014	Marvelous AQL / Japan Studio	Retail version in Japan and Hong Kong only	
Destiny of Spirits	PlayStation Vita	March 20, 2014	Q Entertainment / Japan Studio	PSN	
Infamous Second Son	PlayStation 4	March 21, 2014	Sucker Punch Productions		
MLB 14: The Show	PlayStation 3	April 1, 2014	San Diego Studio	Retail version in North America, download only in PAL	
MLB 14: The Show	PlayStation Vita	April 1, 2014	San Diego Studio	Retail version in North America, download only in PAL	
MLB 14: The Show	PlayStation 4	May 6, 2014	San Diego Studio	Retail version in North America, download only in PAL	
PS Vita Pets: Puppy Parlour	Android	April 14, 2014	Spiral House / XDev	Published under PlayStation Mobile	
PS Vita Pets: Puppy Parlour	iOS	April 14, 2014	Spiral House / XDev	Published under PlayStation Mobile	
Borderlands 2	PlayStation Vita	May 13, 2014	Gearbox Software	Distributed by Sony Computer Entertainment, Published by 2K	
Lemmings Touch	PlayStation Vita	May 27, 2014	D3T	PSN	
PlayStation Vita Pets	PlayStation Vita	June 3, 2014	Spiral House / XDev	Retail version in PAL, download only in North America	
Entwined	PlayStation 4	June 9, 2014	Pixelopus	PSN	
Entwined	PlayStation 3	July 22, 2014	Pixelopus	PSN	
Entwined	PlayStation Vita	July 22, 2014	Pixelopus	PSN	
Freedom Wars	PlayStation Vita	June 26, 2014	Dimps / Japan Studio / Shift		
Oreshika: Tainted Bloodlines	PlayStation Vita	July 14, 2014	Alfa System / Japan Studio	Retail version in Japan and Hong Kong only	
Killzone: Shadow Fall Intercept	PlayStation 4	August 5, 2014	Guerrilla Games	PSN	
Hohokum	PlayStation 3	August 12, 2014	Honeyslug	PSN	
Hohokum	PlayStation 4	August 12, 2014	Honeyslug	PSN	
Hohokum	PlayStation Vita	August 12, 2014	Honeyslug	PSN	
CounterSpy	PlayStation 3	August 19, 2014	Dynamighty	PSN	
CounterSpy	PlayStation 4	August 19, 2014	Dynamighty	PSN	
CounterSpy	PlayStation Vita	August 19, 2014	Dynamighty	PSN	
Infamous First Light	PlayStation 4	August 26, 2014	Sucker Punch Productions	Retail version in PAL, download only in North America	
Destiny	PlayStation 3	September 9, 2014	Bungie	Published by Sony Computer Entertainment in Japan only	
Destiny	PlayStation 4	September 9, 2014	Bungie	Published by Sony Computer Entertainment in Japan only	
Murasaki Baby	PlayStation Vita	September 16, 2014	Avantgarden	PSN	
Driveclub	PlayStation 4	October 7, 2014	Evolution Studios		
Invizimals: The Resistance	PlayStation Vita	October 29, 2014	Novarama		
SingStar	PlayStation 4	October 29, 2014	London Studio	PSN	
SingStar: Ultimate Party	PlayStation 3	October 29, 2014	London Studio		
SingStar: Ultimate Party	PlayStation 4	October 29, 2014	London Studio		
Run Sackboy! Run!	iOS	October 30, 2014	Firesprite	Published under PlayStation Mobile	
Run Sackboy! Run!	Android	December 17, 2014	Firesprite	Published under PlayStation Mobile	
Run Sackboy! Run!	PlayStation Vita	March 31, 2015	Firesprite	PSN	
The Hungry Horde	PlayStation Vita	November 4, 2014	Nosebleed Interactive	PSN	
The Muppets Movie Adventures	PlayStation Vita	November 5, 2014	Virtual Toys	Retail version in PAL, download only in North America	
LittleBigPlanet 3	PlayStation 3	November 18, 2014	Sumo Digital		
LittleBigPlanet 3	PlayStation 4	November 18, 2014	Sumo Digital		
LittleBigPlanet PS Vita: Marvel Super Hero Edition	PlayStation Vita	November 18, 2014	Tarsier Studios	Retail version in PAL, download only in North America	
Fat Princess: Piece of Cake	PlayStation Vita	January 14, 2015		Published under PlayStation Mobile	
Fat Princess: Piece of Cake	Android	January 14, 2015		Published under PlayStation Mobile	
Fat Princess: Piece of Cake	iOS	January 14, 2015		Published under PlayStation Mobile	
Super Stardust Ultra	PlayStation 4	February 10, 2015	Housemarque	PSN	
The Order: 1886	PlayStation 4	February 20, 2015	Ready at Dawn		
Helldivers	PlayStation 3	March 3, 2015	Arrowhead Game Studios	PSN	
Helldivers	PlayStation 4	March 3, 2015	Arrowhead Game Studios	PSN	
Helldivers	PlayStation Vita	March 3, 2015	Arrowhead Game Studios	PSN	
Helldivers	Microsoft Windows	December 7, 2015	Arrowhead Game Studios		
Bloodborne	PlayStation 4	March 24, 2015	FromSoftware / Japan Studio		
MLB 15: The Show	PlayStation 3	March 31, 2015	San Diego Studio	Retail version in North America, download only in PAL	
MLB 15: The Show	PlayStation 4	March 31, 2015	San Diego Studio	Retail version in North America, download only in PAL	
MLB 15: The Show	PlayStation Vita	March 31, 2015	San Diego Studio	Retail version in North America, download only in PAL	
MonsterBag	PlayStation Vita	April 7, 2015		PSN	
Moe Chronicle	PlayStation Vita	May 5, 2015		Asia only	
Ultra Street Fighter IV	PlayStation 4	May 26, 2015	Capcom	PSN Published by Sony Computer Entertainment outside Japan	
Looney Tunes Galactic Sports!	PlayStation Vita	May 27, 2015	Virtual Toys	PAL released, North America release later this year digitally	
Everybody's Gone to the Rapture	PlayStation 4	August 11, 2015	The Chinese Room	PSN	
Everybody's Gone to the Rapture	Microsoft Windows	April 14, 2016	The Chinese Room		
Until Dawn	PlayStation 4	August 25, 2015	Supermassive Games		
Tearaway Unfolded	PlayStation 4	September 8, 2015	Media Molecule / Tarsier Studios		
Destiny: The Taken King	PlayStation 3	September 15, 2015	Bungie	Published by Sony Computer Entertainment in Japan only	
Destiny: The Taken King	PlayStation 4	September 15, 2015	Bungie	Published by Sony Computer Entertainment in Japan only	
Uncharted: The Nathan Drake Collection	PlayStation 4	October 7, 2015	Bluepoint Games		
Driveclub Bikes	PlayStation 4	October 27, 2015	Evolution Studios	PSN	
Phineas and Ferb: Day of Doofenshmirtz	PlayStation Vita	November 4, 2015		Retail version in PAL, download only in North America	
Call of Duty: Black Ops III	PlayStation 3	November 6, 2015	Beenox / Mercenary Technology	Published by Sony Computer Entertainment in Japan only	
Call of Duty: Black Ops III	PlayStation 4	November 6, 2015	Treyarch	Published by Sony Computer Entertainment in Japan only	
BigFest	PlayStation Vita	December 2, 2015		PSN	
Fat Princess Adventures	PlayStation 4	December 5, 2015	Fun Bits	PSN	
Guns Up!	PlayStation 4	December 5, 2015	Valkyrie Entertainment / San Diego Studio	PSN	
Guns Up!	Microsoft Windows	February 5, 2018	Valkyrie Entertainment / San Diego Studio		
Hardware: Rivals	PlayStation 4	January 5, 2016		PSN	
Invizimals: Battle of the Hunters	Android	January 22, 2016	Novarama	Published under PlayStation Mobile	
Invizimals: Battle of the Hunters	iOS	January 22, 2016	Novarama	Published under PlayStation Mobile	
The Heavy Rain & Beyond: Two Souls Collection	PlayStation 4	March 1, 2016	Quantic Dream		
MLB The Show 16	PlayStation 3	March 29, 2016	San Diego Studio		
MLB The Show 16	PlayStation 4	March 29, 2016	San Diego Studio		
Ratchet & Clank	PlayStation 4	April 12, 2016	Insomniac Games		
Alienation	PlayStation 4	April 26, 2016	Housemarque	Retail version in Asia only	
Uncharted: Fortune Hunter	Android	May 5, 2016	Playspree	Published under PlayStation Mobile	
Uncharted: Fortune Hunter	iOS	May 5, 2016	Playspree	Published under PlayStation Mobile	
Uncharted 4: A Thief's End	PlayStation 4	May 10, 2016	Naughty Dog		
Shadow of the Beast	PlayStation 4	May 17, 2016		Retail version in Asia only	
Kill Strain	PlayStation 4	July 12, 2016	San Diego Studio	PSN	
No Man's Sky	PlayStation 4	August 10, 2016	Hello Games	Co-published with Hello Games in PAL only	
Bound	PlayStation 4	August 16, 2016	Plastic	PSN	
Driveclub VR	PlayStation VR	October 13, 2016	Evolution Studios / XDev		
Here They Lie	PlayStation 4	October 13, 2016		Retail version in PAL, download only in North America	
Hustle Kings VR	PlayStation VR	October 13, 2016	Creative Vault Studios	Retail version in PAL, download only in North America	
PlayStation VR Worlds	PlayStation VR	October 10, 2016	London Studio		
RIGS: Mechanized Combat League	PlayStation VR	October 13, 2016	Guerrilla Cambridge		
Super Stardust Ultra VR	PlayStation VR	October 13, 2016	Housemarque	Retail version in PAL, download only in North America	
The Playroom VR	PlayStation VR	October 13, 2016	Japan Studio (Team Asobi)	PSN	
Tumble VR	PlayStation VR	October 13, 2016	Supermassive Games	PSN	
Until Dawn: Rush of Blood	PlayStation VR	October 13, 2016	Supermassive Games		
The Tomorrow Children	PlayStation 4	October 25, 2016	Q-Games / Japan Studio	PSN	
Call of Duty: Infinite Warfare	PlayStation 4	November 4, 2016	Infinity Ward	Published by Sony Interactive Entertainment in Japan	
Call of Duty: Modern Warfare Remastered	PlayStation 4	November 4, 2016	Raven Software	Published by Sony Interactive Entertainment in Japan	
The Last Guardian	PlayStation 4	December 6, 2016	Japan Studio (Team Ico) / GenDesign		
Japan Studio VR Music Festival	PlayStation VR	2017	Japan Studio		
Mingol	Android	2017		Published by ForwardWorks in Japan only	
Mingol	iOS	2017		Published by ForwardWorks in Japan only	
Sora to Umi no Aida	Android	2017		Published by ForwardWorks in Japan only	
Sora to Umi no Aida	iOS	2017		Published by ForwardWorks in Japan only	
Gravity Rush 2	PlayStation 4	January 18, 2017	Japan Studio (Team Gravity)		
Nioh	PlayStation 4	February 7, 2017	Team Ninja	Published by Sony Interactive Entertainment outside Japan	
Nioh	PlayStation 5	February 5, 2021	Team Ninja	PSN Published by Sony Interactive Entertainment outside Japan	
Horizon Zero Dawn	PlayStation 4	February 28, 2017	Guerrilla Games		
Horizon Zero Dawn	Microsoft Windows	August 7, 2020	Virtuos		
Horizon Zero Dawn	PlayStation 5	October 31, 2024	Nixxes Software		
MLB The Show 17	PlayStation 4	March 28, 2017	San Diego Studio		
Drawn to Death	PlayStation 4	April 4, 2017	The Bartlet Jones Supernatural Detective Agency / San Diego Studio	PSN	
StarBlood Arena	PlayStation VR	April 11, 2017	WhiteMoon Dreams / San Diego Studio		
Farpoint	PlayStation VR	May 16, 2017	Impulse Gear		
Wipeout Omega Collection	PlayStation 4	June 6, 2017	XDev / Clever Beans / Creative Vault Studios		
Air Force Special Ops: Nightfall	PlayStation VR	June 20, 2017	Firesprite	PSN	
Honkowa Presents: Nogizaka46 VR Horror House	PlayStation VR	July 3, 2017		PSN Only available in Japan	
That's You!	PlayStation 4	July 4, 2017	Wish Studios		
Crash Bandicoot N. Sane Trilogy	PlayStation 4	August 3, 2017	Vicarious Visions	Published by Sony Interactive Entertainment in Japan only	
Matterfall	PlayStation 4	August 15, 2017	Housemarque	Retail version in PAL, download only in North America	
Uncharted: The Lost Legacy	PlayStation 4	August 22, 2017	Naughty Dog		
Everybody's Golf	PlayStation 4	August 29, 2017	Clap Hanz / Japan Studio		
Knack II	PlayStation 4	September 5, 2017	Japan Studio		
Destiny 2	PlayStation 4	September 6, 2017	Bungie	Published by Sony Interactive Entertainment in Japan only	
Gran Turismo Sport	PlayStation 4	October 17, 2017	Polyphony Digital		
No Heroes Allowed! VR	PlayStation VR	October 17, 2017	Acquire / Japan Studio	Retail version in Asia, download only internationally	
Hidden Agenda	PlayStation 4	October 24, 2017	Supermassive Games		
Knowledge is Power	PlayStation 4	October 24, 2017	Wish Studios		
SingStar Celebration	PlayStation 4	October 24, 2017	London Studio		
Stifled	PlayStation 4	October 31, 2017		PSN	
Call of Duty: WWII	PlayStation 4	November 3, 2017	Sledgehammer Games	Published by Sony Interactive Entertainment in Japan	
Jak and Daxter Bundle	PlayStation 4	November 28, 2017	Naughty Dog	PSN	
The Last Guardian VR Demo	PlayStation VR	December 12, 2017	Japan Studio / GenDesign	PSN	
Arc the Lad R	Android	2018		Published by ForwardWorks in Japan only	
Arc the Lad R	iOS	2018		Published by ForwardWorks in Japan only	
No Heroes Allowed! DASH!	Android	2018		Published by ForwardWorks in Japan only	
No Heroes Allowed! DASH!	iOS	2018		Published by ForwardWorks in Japan only	
Wild Arms: Million Memories	Android	2018		Published by ForwardWorks in Japan only	
Wild Arms: Million Memories	iOS	2018		Published by ForwardWorks in Japan only	
The Inpatient	PlayStation VR	January 23, 2018	Supermassive Games		
Shadow of the Colossus	PlayStation 4	February 6, 2018	Bluepoint Games / Japan Studio		
Bravo Team	PlayStation VR	March 6, 2018	Supermassive Games		
Frantics	PlayStation 4	March 6, 2018		Retail version released in PAL only	
World of Warriors	PlayStation 4	March 21, 2018	Mind Candy	PSN	
MLB The Show 18	PlayStation 4	March 27, 2018	San Diego Studio		
God of War	PlayStation 4	April 20, 2018	Santa Monica Studio		
God of War	Microsoft Windows	January 14, 2022	Jetpack Interactive		
Animal Force	PlayStation VR	May 22, 2018	Oasis Games	PSN Published by SIE outside North America	
Detroit: Become Human	PlayStation 4	May 25, 2018	Quantic Dream		
Track Lab	PlayStation VR	August 21, 2018	Little Chicken	PSN	
Firewall: Zero Hour	PlayStation VR	August 28, 2018	First Contact Entertainment		
Destiny 2: Forsaken	PlayStation 4	September 4, 2018	Bungie	Co-published by Sony Interactive Entertainment in Japan only	
Marvel's Spider-Man	PlayStation 4	September 7, 2018	Insomniac Games		
Marvel's Spider-Man	PlayStation 5	November 12, 2020	Insomniac Games	PSN	
Marvel's Spider-Man	Microsoft Windows	August 12, 2022	Nixxes Software		
Astro Bot Rescue Mission	PlayStation VR	October 2, 2018	Japan Studio (Team Asobi)		
Call of Duty: Black Ops 4	PlayStation 4	October 12, 2018	Treyarch	Published by Sony Interactive Entertainment in Japan	
Déraciné	PlayStation VR	November 6, 2018	FromSoftware / Japan Studio		
Tetris Effect	PlayStation 4	November 9, 2018	Monstars / Resonair	Retail Version	
Chimparty	PlayStation 4	November 13, 2018	NapNok	Retail version released in PAL only	
Knowledge is Power: Decades	PlayStation 4	November 13, 2018	Wish Studios	Retail version released in PAL only	
Quantic Dream Collection	PlayStation 4	December 4, 2018	Quantic Dream	North America only	
Lemmings	Android	December 20, 2018		Published under PlayStation Mobile	
Lemmings	iOS	December 20, 2018		Published under PlayStation Mobile	
Disgaea RPG	Android	2019		Published by ForwardWorks in Japan only	
Disgaea RPG	iOS	2019		Published by ForwardWorks in Japan only	
Kendama no Gon Jiro Fit & Run	Android	2019		Published by ForwardWorks in Japan only	
Kendama no Gon Jiro Fit & Run	iOS	2019		Published by ForwardWorks in Japan only	
Toro to Puzzle: Doko Demo Issyo	Android	2019		Published by ForwardWorks in Japan only	
Toro to Puzzle: Doko Demo Issyo	iOS	2019		Published by ForwardWorks in Japan only	
GoGo Robottopuroguramingu ~Rojībo No Himitsu~	toio	March 20, 2019		Japan only	
Kōsaku Seibutsu Gezunroido	toio	March 20, 2019		Japan only	
Toio Korekushon	toio	March 20, 2019		Japan only	
MLB The Show 19	PlayStation 4	March 26, 2019	San Diego Studio		
Immortal Legacy: The Jade Cipher	PlayStation VR	April 16, 2019	Viva Games	PSN	
Days Gone	PlayStation 4	April 26, 2019	Bend Studio		
Days Gone	Microsoft Windows	May 18, 2021	Bend Studio		
Days Gone	PlayStation 5	April 25, 2025	Bend Studio		
Everybody's Golf VR	PlayStation VR	May 21, 2019	Clap Hanz / Japan Studio		
Blood & Truth	PlayStation VR	May 28, 2019	London Studio		
Erica	PlayStation 4	August 19, 2019	Flavourworks / London Studio	PSN	
ReadySet Heroes	Microsoft Windows	October 1, 2019		PSN	
ReadySet Heroes	PlayStation 4	October 1, 2019		PSN	
Concrete Genie	PlayStation 4	October 8, 2019	Pixelopus		
Monkey King: Hero Is Back	PlayStation 4	October 16, 2019	HexaDrive / Japan Studio	Co-Published with THQ Nordic in Asia only	
Call of Duty: Modern Warfare	PlayStation 4	October 25, 2019	Infinity Ward	Published by Sony Interactive Entertainment in Japan	
MediEvil	PlayStation 4	October 25, 2019	Other Ocean Interactive		
Death Stranding	PlayStation 4	November 8, 2019	Kojima Productions		
Death Stranding	PlayStation 5	September 24, 2021	Kojima Productions		
Toio Doraibu	toio	November 14, 2019		Japan only	
〜Min'nade Motto Tanoshimeru〜 Toio Korekushon Kakuchō Pakku	toio	December 5, 2019		Japan only	
World Witches: United Front	Android	2020		Published by ForwardWorks in Japan only	
World Witches: United Front	iOS	2020		Published by ForwardWorks in Japan only	
Dreams	PlayStation 4	February 14, 2020	Media Molecule		
Nioh 2	PlayStation 4	March 13, 2020	Team Ninja	Published by Sony Interactive Entertainment outside Asia	
Nioh 2	PlayStation 5	February 5, 2021	Team Ninja	PSN Published by Sony Interactive Entertainment outside Japan	
MLB The Show 20	PlayStation 4	March 17, 2020	San Diego Studio		
Tilt Brush	PlayStation VR	March 26, 2020	Google	PSN	
Predator: Hunting Grounds	PlayStation 4	April 24, 2020	IllFonic		
Predator: Hunting Grounds	Microsoft Windows	April 24, 2020	IllFonic		
The Last of Us Part II	PlayStation 4	June 19, 2020	Naughty Dog		
The Last of Us Part II	PlayStation 5	January 19, 2024	Naughty Dog		
The Last of Us Part II	Microsoft Windows	April 3, 2025	Naughty Dog / Nixxes Software / Iron Galaxy		
Marvel's Iron Man VR	PlayStation VR	July 3, 2020	Camouflaj		
Ghost of Tsushima	PlayStation 4	July 17, 2020	Sucker Punch Productions		
Ghost of Tsushima	PlayStation 5	August 20, 2021	Sucker Punch Productions		
Ghost of Tsushima	Microsoft Windows	May 16, 2024	Nixxes Software		
On Gaku de Asobou Pikotonzu	toio	September 10, 2020		Japan only	
Astro's Playroom	PlayStation 5	November 12, 2020	Japan Studio (Team Asobi)	PSN	
Demon's Souls	PlayStation 5	November 12, 2020	Bluepoint Games / Japan Studio		
Sackboy: A Big Adventure	PlayStation 4	November 12, 2020	Sumo Digital		
Sackboy: A Big Adventure	PlayStation 5	November 12, 2020	Sumo Digital		
Sackboy: A Big Adventure	Microsoft Windows	October 27, 2022	Sumo Digital		
Marvel's Spider-Man: Miles Morales	PlayStation 4	November 12, 2020	Insomniac Games		
Marvel's Spider-Man: Miles Morales	PlayStation 5	November 12, 2020	Insomniac Games		
Marvel's Spider-Man: Miles Morales	Microsoft Windows	November 18, 2022	Nixxes Software		
Call of Duty: Black Ops Cold War	PlayStation 4	November 13, 2020	Treyarch / Raven Software	Published by Sony Interactive Entertainment in Japan	
Call of Duty: Black Ops Cold War	PlayStation 5	November 13, 2020	Treyarch / Raven Software	Published by Sony Interactive Entertainment in Japan	
Dai Maō No Bijutsukan to Kaitō-Dan	toio	November 19, 2020		Japan only	
Nyorokko	Android	2021		Published by ForwardWorks in Japan only	
Nyorokko	iOS	2021		Published by ForwardWorks in Japan only	
Destruction AllStars	PlayStation 5	February 2, 2021	Lucid Games	Retail version released on April 7, 2021	
The Nioh Collection	PlayStation 5	February 5, 2021	Team Ninja	Published by Sony Interactive Entertainment outside Japan	
MLB The Show 21	PlayStation 4	April 20, 2021	San Diego Studio		
MLB The Show 21	PlayStation 5	April 20, 2021	San Diego Studio		
Returnal	PlayStation 5	April 30, 2021	Housemarque		
Returnal	Microsoft Windows	February 15, 2023	Climax Studios		
Ratchet & Clank: Rift Apart	PlayStation 5	June 11, 2021	Insomniac Games		
Ratchet & Clank: Rift Apart	Microsoft Windows	July 26, 2023	Nixxes Software		
Ghost of Tsushima: Legends	PlayStation 4	September 3, 2021	Sucker Punch Productions	PSN	
Ghost of Tsushima: Legends	PlayStation 5	September 3, 2021	Sucker Punch Productions	PSN	
Call of Duty: Vanguard	PlayStation 4	November 5, 2021	Sledgehammer Games	Published by Sony Interactive Entertainment in Japan	
Call of Duty: Vanguard	PlayStation 5	November 5, 2021	Sledgehammer Games	Published by Sony Interactive Entertainment in Japan	
Uncharted: Legacy of Thieves Collection	PlayStation 5	January 28, 2022	Naughty Dog		
Uncharted: Legacy of Thieves Collection	Microsoft Windows	October 19, 2022	Naughty Dog / Iron Galaxy		
Horizon Forbidden West	PlayStation 4	February 18, 2022	Guerrilla Games		
Horizon Forbidden West	PlayStation 5	February 18, 2022	Guerrilla Games		
Horizon Forbidden West	Microsoft Windows	March 21, 2024	Nixxes Software		
Gran Turismo 7	PlayStation 4	March 4, 2022	Polyphony Digital		
Gran Turismo 7	PlayStation 5	March 4, 2022	Polyphony Digital		
MLB The Show 22	PlayStation 4	April 5, 2022	San Diego Studio		
MLB The Show 22	PlayStation 5	April 5, 2022	San Diego Studio		
The Last of Us Part I	PlayStation 5	September 2, 2022	Naughty Dog		
The Last of Us Part I	Microsoft Windows	March 28, 2023	Naughty Dog / Iron Galaxy		
God of War Ragnarök	PlayStation 4	November 9, 2022	Santa Monica Studio		
God of War Ragnarök	PlayStation 5	November 9, 2022	Santa Monica Studio		
God of War Ragnarök	Microsoft Windows	September 19, 2024	Jetpack Interactive		
GoGo Robottopuroguramingu Adobansu	toio	2023		Japan only	
Horizon Call of the Mountain	PlayStation VR2	February 22, 2023	Firesprite / Guerrilla Games		
MLB The Show 23	PlayStation 4	March 28, 2023	San Diego Studio		
MLB The Show 23	PlayStation 5	March 28, 2023	San Diego Studio		
Firewall Ultra	PlayStation VR2	August 24, 2023	First Contact Entertainment		
Marvel's Spider-Man 2	PlayStation 5	October 20, 2023	Insomniac Games		
Marvel's Spider-Man 2	Microsoft Windows	January 30, 2025	Nixxes Software		
Toio Pureiguraundo Bēshikku	toio	2024		Japan only	
Toio Pureiguraundo Adobansu	toio	2024		Japan only	
Helldivers II	PlayStation 5	February 8, 2024	Arrowhead Game Studios		
Helldivers II	Microsoft Windows	February 8, 2024	Arrowhead Game Studios		
Helldivers II	Xbox Series X/S	August 26, 2025	Nixxes Software		
MLB The Show 24	PlayStation 4	March 19, 2024	San Diego Studio		
MLB The Show 24	PlayStation 5	March 19, 2024	San Diego Studio		
Rise of the Ronin	PlayStation 5	March 22, 2024	Team Ninja		
Stellar Blade	PlayStation 5	April 26, 2024	Shift Up		
Stellar Blade	Microsoft Windows	June 11, 2025	Shift Up		
Concord	PlayStation 5	August 23, 2024	Firewalk Studios		
Concord	Microsoft Windows	August 23, 2024	Firewalk Studios		
Astro Bot	PlayStation 5	September 6, 2024	Team Asobi		
Until Dawn	PlayStation 5	October 4, 2024	Ballistic Moon		
Until Dawn	Microsoft Windows	October 4, 2024	Ballistic Moon		
Lego Horizon Adventures	PlayStation 5	November 14, 2024	Guerrilla Games / Studio Gobo		
Lego Horizon Adventures	Nintendo Switch	November 14, 2024	Guerrilla Games / Studio Gobo		
Lego Horizon Adventures	Microsoft Windows	November 14, 2024	Guerrilla Games / Studio Gobo		
My First Gran Turismo	PlayStation 4	December 6, 2024	Polyphony Digital		
My First Gran Turismo	PlayStation 5	December 6, 2024	Polyphony Digital		
MLB The Show 25	PlayStation 5	March 18, 2025	San Diego Studio		
Death Stranding 2: On the Beach	PlayStation 5	June 26, 2025	Kojima Productions		
Midnight Murder Club	PlayStation 5	August 14, 2025	Velan Studios		
Midnight Murder Club	Microsoft Windows	August 14, 2025	Velan Studios		
Lost Soul Aside	PlayStation 5	August 29, 2025	Ultizero Games		
Lost Soul Aside	Microsoft Windows	August 29, 2025	Ultizero Games		
Ghost of Yōtei	PlayStation 5	October 2, 2025	Sucker Punch Productions		
God of War Sons of Sparta	PlayStation 5	February 12, 2026	Mega Cat Studios / Santa Monica Studio		
Marathon	PlayStation 5	March 5, 2026	Bungie	Published by Bungie	
Marathon	Xbox Series X/S	March 5, 2026	Bungie	Published by Bungie	
Marathon	Microsoft Windows	March 5, 2026	Bungie	Published by Bungie	
MLB The Show 26	PlayStation 5	March 17, 2026	San Diego Studio		
Saros	PlayStation 5	April 30, 2026	Housemarque		
Marvel Tōkon: Fighting Souls	PlayStation 5	August 6, 2026	Arc System Works		
Marvel Tōkon: Fighting Souls	Microsoft Windows	August 6, 2026	Arc System Works		
Marvel's Wolverine	PlayStation 5	September 15, 2026	Insomniac Games		
Kena: Scars of Kosmora	PlayStation 5	2027	Ember Lab		
Kena: Scars of Kosmora	Microsoft Windows	2027	Ember Lab		
Until Dawn 2	PlayStation 5	January 28, 2027	Firesprite		
4:LOOP	PlayStation 5	TBA	Bad Robot Games		
4:LOOP	Microsoft Windows	TBA	Bad Robot Games		
Horizon Hunters Gathering	PlayStation 5	TBA	Guerrilla Games		
Horizon Hunters Gathering	Microsoft Windows	TBA	Guerrilla Games		
Convallaria	PlayStation 4	TBA	Loong Force		
Convallaria	PlayStation 5	TBA	Loong Force		
Intergalactic: The Heretic Prophet	PlayStation 5	TBA	Naughty Dog		
Star Wars: Knights of the Old Republic Remake	PlayStation 5	TBA	Aspyr / Saber Interactive		

== PlayStation ==
=== 1994 ===
- Retail
  - Crime Crackers (Japan only)
  - Motor Toon Grand Prix (Japan only)

=== 1995 ===
- Retail
  - 3D Lemmings (Published by Psygnosis)
  - Air Combat (Co-published with Namco in PAL only)
  - Arc the Lad (Japan only)
  - Battle Arena Toshinden (Co-published with Takara in North America and PAL only)
  - Beyond the Beyond (Japan & North America only)
  - Cyber Sled (Co-Published with Namco in PAL only)
  - Destruction Derby (Published by Psygnosis)
  - Discworld (video game) (Published by Psygnosis)
  - ESPN Extreme Games/1Xtreme
  - Hermie Hopperhead: Scrap Panic (Japan only)
  - Jumping Flash!
  - Kileak: The Blood
  - Mortal Kombat 3 (Co-published with Midway Games)
  - NHL FaceOff (North America and PAL only)
  - Novastorm (Published by Psygnosis)
  - Philosoma
  - Project: Horned Owl (Japan and North America only)
  - Rapid Reload (Japan and PAL only)
  - Ridge Racer (Co-published with Namco in PAL only)
  - Sengoku Cyber: Fujimaru Jigokuhen (Japan only)
  - Sentou Kokka: Air Land Battle (Japan only)
  - Shanghai: Banri no Choujou (Japan only)
  - Tekken (Co-published with Namco in PAL only)
  - The Raiden Project (North America only)
  - Twisted Metal
  - Victory Zone (Japan only)
  - Warhawk
  - Wipeout (Published by Psygnosis)
  - Wizardry VII: Gadeia no Houshu (Japan only)

=== 1996 ===
- Retail
  - 2Xtreme
  - A-IV Evolution Global (Co-published with Artdink in PAL only)
  - Adidas Power Soccer (Published by Psygnosis)
  - Aquanaut's Holiday (North America and PAL only)
  - Arc the Lad II (Japan only)
  - Assault Rigs (Published by Psygnosis)
  - Battle Arena Toshinden 2 (Co-published with Takara in PAL only)
  - Broken Sword: The Shadow of the Templars (PAL only)
  - Chronicles of the Sword (Published by Psygnosis in North America and PAL only)
  - Cool Boarders (North America and PAL only)
  - Crash Bandicoot
  - Defcon 5 (Published by Psygnosis in PAL only)
  - Destruction Derby 2 (Published by Psygnosis)
  - Epidemic
  - Formula 1 (Published by Psygnosis)
  - Galaxian^3 (Co-published with Namco in PAL only)
  - Jet Moto
  - Jumping Flash! 2
  - Krazy Ivan (Published by Psygnosis)
  - Mickey's Wild Adventure (Co-published with Disney Interactive in PAL only)
  - MLB Pennant Race (North America only)
  - Motor Toon Grand Prix 2
  - Myst (Published by Psygnosis)
  - Namco Museum Vol. 1 (Co-published with Namco in PAL only)
  - Namco Museum Vol. 2 (Co-published with Namco in PAL only)
  - Namco Soccer Prime Goal (Co-published with Namco in PAL only)
  - Namco Tennis Smash Court (Co-published with Namco in PAL only)
  - NBA ShootOut
  - NCAA GameBreaker (North America only)
  - NFL GameDay (North America and PAL only)
  - NFL GameDay 97 (North America only)
  - NHL FaceOff '97
  - Pandemonium (Co-published with Crystal Dynamics in PAL only)
  - PaRappa the Rapper
  - Penny Racers (Co-published with Takara in PAL only)
  - Popolocrois Story (Japan only)
  - Raging Skies (Co-published with Asmik Ace Entertainment in PAL only)
  - RayStorm (Co-published with Taito in PAL only)
  - Ridge Racer Revolution (Co-published with Namco in PAL only)
  - Samurai Shodown III: Blades of Blood (Co-published with SNK in North America and PAL only)
  - StarBlade Alpha (Co-published with Namco in PAL only)
  - Tekken 2 (Co-published with Namco in PAL only)
  - The Adventures of Lomax (Published by Psygnosis)
  - The King of Fighters '95 (Co-published with SNK in North America and PAL only)
  - Tobal No. 1 (Co-published with Squaresoft in North America and PAL only)
  - Twisted Metal 2
  - Victory Zone 2 (Japan only)
  - Wipeout 2097 (Published by Psygnosis)

=== 1997 ===
- Retail
  - Ace Combat 2 (Co-published with Namco in PAL only)
  - Adidas Power Soccer International 97 (Published by Psygnosis)
  - Alundra (Published by Sony Computer Entertainment in Japan and by Psygnosis in PAL only)
  - Battle Arena Toshinden 3 (Co-published with Takara in PAL only)
  - Bloody Roar (North America only)
  - Broken Sword II: The Smoking Mirror (PAL only)
  - Bushido Blade (Co-published with Squaresoft in North America and PAL only)
  - Carnage Heart (Co-published with Artdink in North America and PAL only)
  - CART World Series (North America only)
  - Crime Crackers 2 (Japan only)
  - Colony Wars (Published by Psygnosis)
  - Cool Boarders 2 (North America and PAL only)
  - Crash Bandicoot 2: Cortex Strikes Back
  - Discworld II: Missing Presumed...?! (Published by Psygnosis)
  - Disney's Hercules (Co-published with Disney Interactive in PAL only)
  - Final Fantasy VII (Co-published with Squaresoft in North America and PAL only)
  - Formula 1 97 (Published by Psygnosis)
  - G-Police (Published by Psygnosis)
  - Ghost in the Shell (Japan and PAL only)
  - I.Q.: Intelligent Qube
  - Jet Moto 2
  - King's Field (Co-published with From Software in PAL only)
  - League of Pain (Published by Psygnosis)
  - Lifeforce Tenka (Published by Psygnosis in North America and PAL only)
  - MLB 98 (North America only)
  - Monster Trucks (Published by Psygnosis in North America and PAL only)
  - Namco Museum Vol. 3 (Co-published with Namco in PAL only)
  - Namco Museum Vol. 4 (Co-published with Namco in PAL only)
  - Namco Museum Vol. 5 (Co-published with Namco in PAL only)
  - NBA ShootOut '97
  - NCAA Gamebreaker 98 (North America only)
  - NFL GameDay 98 (North America only)
  - NHL FaceOff 98 (North America and PAL only)
  - Overboard! (Published by Psygnosis)
  - Porsche Challenge
  - Princess Maker: Yumemiru Yousei (Japan only)
  - Quest for Fame (Japan only)
  - Rage Racer (Co-published with Namco in PAL only)
  - Rally Cross
  - Rapid Racer
  - Ray Tracers (Co-published with Taito in PAL only)
  - Real Bout Fatal Fury (Co-published with SNK in PAL only)
  - Rosco McQueen Firefighter Extreme (Published by Psygnosis)
  - Rush Hour (Published by Psygnosis)
  - SAPARi (Co-Published with VAIO)
  - Sentient (Published by Psygnosis in North America only)
  - Shadow Master (Published by Psygnosis in North America and PAL only)
  - Soul Blade (Co-published with Namco in PAL only)
  - Spawn: The Eternal
  - Steel Reign
  - Tail of the Sun (Co-published with Artdink in North America only)
  - The City of Lost Children (Published by Psygnosis in North America and PAL only)
  - Time Crisis (Co-published with Namco in PAL only)
  - Velldeselba Senki Tsubasa no Kunshou (Japan only)
  - Wild Arms
  - Xevious 3D/G+ (Co-published with Namco in PAL only)
  - Z (Co-published with GT Interactive in PAL only)

=== 1998 ===
- Retail
  - Adidas Power Soccer 2 (Published by Psygnosis)
  - Adidas Power Soccer 98 (Published by Psygnosis)
  - Armored Core (Co-published with From Software in PAL only)
  - Baby Universe (Japan and PAL only)
  - Blast Radius (Published by Psygnosis)
  - Blasto
  - Bomberman World (Co-published with Hudson in PAL only)
  - Bust a Groove (Co-published with Enix by 989 Studios in North America and by Sony Computer Entertainment in PAL only)
  - Cardinal Syn
  - Colony Wars: Vengeance (Published by Psygnosis)
  - Contender (North America only)
  - Cool Boarders 3 (Published by 989 Sports in North America and by Sony Computer Entertainment in PAL only)
  - Crash Bandicoot: Warped
  - Dead or Alive (Co-published with Tecmo in PAL only)
  - Devil Dice (Japan and PAL only)
  - Double Cast (Japan only)
  - Disney•Pixar A Bug's Life (Co-published with Disney Interactive)
  - Ehrgeiz: God Bless the Ring (Co-published with Squaresoft in Japan and PAL only) (Note: Uncredited on PAL and some Japan releases)
  - Einhänder (Co-published with Squaresoft in North America only)
  - ESPN X Games Pro Boarder (Co-published with ESPN Digital Games in PAL only)
  - Everybody's Golf
  - Final Fantasy Tactics (Co-published with Squaresoft in North America only)
  - Fluid (Japan and PAL only)
  - Formula 1 98 (Published by Psygnosis in North America and PAL only)
  - Gran Turismo
  - Jersey Devil (North America only)
  - Kisetsu o Dakishimete (Japan only)
  - Klonoa: Door to Phantomile (Co-published with Namco in PAL only)
  - Kula World (Published by Sony Computer Entertainment in Japan and PAL, and by Psygnosis in North America only)
  - Legend of Legaia
  - Libero Grande (Co-published with Namco in PAL only)
  - MediEvil
  - MLB 99 (North America only)
  - NBA ShootOut '98 (Published by 989 Sports in North America and by Sony Computer Entertainment in PAL only)
  - NCAA Final Four 99 (Published by 989 Sports in North America only)
  - NCAA Gamebreaker 99 (Published by 989 Sports in North America only)
  - Newman/Haas Racing (Published by Psygnosis)
  - NFL GameDay 99 (Published by 989 Sports in North America only)
  - NFL Xtreme (Published by 989 Sports in North America and by Sony Computer Entertainment in PAL only)
  - NHL FaceOff 99 (Published by 989 Sports in North America and PAL only)
  - Nightmare Creatures (Co-published with Kalisto Entertainment in PAL only)
  - O.D.T. – Escape... Or Die Trying (Published by Psygnosis)
  - Oh No! More Lemmings (Published by SCE Studio Liverpool)
  - Pet in TV (Japan and PAL only)
  - Point Blank (Co-published with Namco in PAL only)
  - Poporogue (Japan only)
  - Psybadek (Published by Psygnosis in North America and PAL only)
  - Rally Cross 2
  - Rascal (Published by Psygnosis in North America and PAL only)
  - Running Wild
  - SaGa Frontier (Co-published with Squaresoft in North America only)
  - Sampaguita (Japan only)
  - Sentinel Returns (Published by Psygnosis)
  - Souten no Shiroki Kami no Za: Great Peak (Japan only)
  - Spice World (Published by Sony Computer Entertainment in PAL and by Psygnosis in North America only)
  - Tekken 3 (Co-published with Namco in PAL only)
  - The Fifth Element (Co-published with Kalisto Entertainment in PAL only)
  - Tomba! (North America and PAL only)
  - Treasures of the Deep (Co-published with Namco in PAL only)
  - Twisted Metal III (Published by 989 Studios in North America only)
  - Yukiwari no Hana (Japan only)
  - Zero Divide 2 (Co-published with Zoom in PAL only)

=== 1999 ===
- Retail
  - 3Xtreme (Published by 989 Sports in North America only)
  - Alundra 2: A New Legend Begins (Japan only)
  - Anna Kournikova's Smash Court Tennis (Co-published with Namco in PAL only)
  - Ape Escape (PocketStation support)
  - Arc the Lad III (Japan only) (PocketStation support)
  - Attack of the Saucerman (Published by Psygnosis)
  - Barbie: Race & Ride (PAL only)
  - Bloodlines (PAL only)
  - Bloody Roar II (North America only)
  - Brightis (Japan only) (PocketStation support)
  - Cool Boarders 4 (Published by 989 Sports in North America and PAL only)
  - Crash Bandicoot 3: Warped (PocketStation support)
  - Crash Team Racing
  - Destrega (Co-published with Koei in PAL only)
  - Disney•Pixar A Bug's Life Activity Center (Co-published with Disney Interactive in PAL only)
  - Disney's Magical Tetris (Co-published with Disney Interactive in PAL only)
  - Disney's Tarzan (Co-published with Disney Interactive in PAL only)
  - Doko Demo Issyo (Japan only) (PocketStation support)
  - Eliminator (Published by Psygnosis)
  - Final Fantasy VIII (Co-published with Squaresoft in PAL, China, Hong Kong and Singapore only) (Note: Uncredited on PAL releases)
  - Formula One 99 (Published by Psygnosis in North America and Japan, and by Sony Computer Entertainment in PAL)
  - G-Police: Weapons of Justice (Published by Psygnosis in North America and by Sony Computer Entertainment in PAL only)
  - Global Domination (Published by Psygnosis)
  - Global Force: Shin Sentou Kokka (Japan only)
  - Gran Turismo 2
  - Grandia (North America only)
  - Jet Moto 3 (Published by 989 Sports in North America only)
  - Kingsley's Adventure (Published by Psygnosis in North America and PAL only)
  - Kurushi Final: Mental Blocks (PocketStation support)
  - Love & Destroy (Japan only)
  - MLB 2000 (Published by 989 Sports in North America only)
  - NBA ShootOut 2000 (Published by 989 Sports in North America only)
  - NCAA Final Four 99 (Published by 989 Sports in North America only)
  - NCAA Final Four 2000 (Published by 989 Sports in North America only)
  - NCAA Gamebreaker 2000 (Published by 989 Sports in North America only)
  - NFL GameDay 2000 (Published by 989 Sports in North America only)
  - NFL Xtreme 2 (Published by 989 Sports in North America only)
  - NHL FaceOff 2000 (Published by 989 Sports in North America and by Sony Computer Entertainment in PAL only)
  - Omega Boost
  - Ore no Ryouri (Japan only)
  - Over My Remain/Ore no Shikabane o Koete Yuke (Japan only)
  - Pocket Dungeon (Japan only) (PocketStation support)
  - Pocket MuuMuu (Japan only) (PocketStation support)
  - Point Blank 2 (Co-published with Namco in PAL only)
  - Poporogue (Japan only) (PocketStation support)
  - Pro 18: World Tour Golf (Published by Psygnosis)
  - R-Type Delta (Co-published with Irem in PAL only)
  - R4: Ridge Racer Type 4 (Co-published with Namco in PAL only)
  - Retro Force (Published by Psygnosis in PAL only)
  - Rollcage (Published by Psygnosis)
  - Speed Freaks (North America and PAL only)
  - Spyro the Dragon (PocketStation support)
  - Star Ocean: The Second Story (Co-published with Enix in North America and PAL only)
  - Supercross Circuit (Published by 989 Sports in North America only)
  - Syphon Filter (Published by 989 Studios in North America and by Sony Computer Entertainment in PAL only)
  - The Granstream Saga (Published by Sony Computer Entertainment in Japan and co-published with ARC Entertainment in PAL only)
  - The X-Files Game (Co-published with Fox Interactive in PAL only)
  - This is Football
  - Tiny Tank: Up Your Arsenal (North America and PAL only)
  - Tiny Toon Adventures: Buster and the beanstalk (PAL only)
  - Tomba! 2: The Evil Swine Return (North America and PAL only)
  - Tomoyasu Hotei: Stolen Song (Japan only)
  - Twisted Metal 4 (Published by 989 Studios in North America only)
  - UmJammer Lammy
  - Vib-Ribbon (Japan and PAL only)
  - Wipeout 3 (Published by Sony Computer Entertainment in PAL and Japan, and by Psygnosis in North America)
  - XI Jumbo (Japan only)

=== 2000 ===
- Retail
  - Ace Combat 3: Electrosphere (Co-published with Namco in PAL only)
  - Aconcagua (Japan only)
  - Barbie Super Sports (PAL only)
  - Bealphareth (Japan only)
  - Boku no Natsuyasumi (Japan only)
  - Colin McRae Rally (North America only)
  - Colony Wars: Red Sun (Published by Psygnosis)
  - Cool Boarders 2001 (North America only)
  - Covert Ops: Nuclear Dawn (Japan and PAL only)
  - Crash Bash
  - Destruction Derby Raw (PAL only)
  - Disney's Aladdin in Nasira's Revenge (Co-published with Disney Interactive in PAL and North America only)
  - Disney's Story Studio: Mulan (Co-published with Disney Interactive in PAL only)
  - Disney's The Emperor's New Groove (Co-published with Disney Interactive in North America and PAL only)
  - Doko Demo Issho Tsuika Disc: Koneko Mo Issho (Japan only) (PocketStation support)
  - Dragon Valor (Co-published with Namco in PAL only)
  - Everybody's Golf 2 (PocketStation support)
  - Formula One 2000 (North America and PAL only)
  - Ghoul Panic (Co-published with Namco in PAL only)
  - Grind Session (North America and PAL only)
  - Jackie Chan Stuntmaster (Co-published with Radical Entertainment in PAL only)
  - In Cold Blood (PAL only)
  - Legend of Dragoon
  - Magical Dice Kids (Japan only)
  - MediEvil 2
  - MLB 2001 (North America only)
  - Monster Rancher (Co-published with Tecmo in PAL only)
  - Moto Racer World Tour (PAL only)
  - Mr. Driller (Co-published with Namco in PAL only)
  - Ms. Pac-Man Maze Madness (Co-published with Namco in PAL only)
  - Muppet Monster Adventure (PAL only)
  - Muppet RaceMania (PAL only)
  - NBA ShootOut 2001 (North America only)
  - NCAA Final Four 2000 (North America only)
  - NCAA Gamebreaker 2001 (North America only)
  - NFL GameDay 2001 (North America only)
  - NHL FaceOff 2001 (North America only)
  - Pac-Man World (Co-published with Namco in PAL only)
  - Pocket Jiman (Japan only) (PocketStation support)
  - Popolocrois Story II (Japan only)
  - Rescue Shot (Co-published with Namco in PAL only)
  - Rollcage Stage II (PAL only)
  - Shachou Eiyuuden: The Eagle Shooting Heroes (Japan only)
  - Shadow Madness (Co-published with Crave Entertainment in PAL only)
  - Space Debris (PAL only)
  - Spyro 2: Ripto's Rage! (PocketStation support)
  - Spyro: Year of the Dragon
  - Star Ixiom (Co-published with Namco in PAL only)
  - Syphon Filter 2 (Published by 989 Studios in North America and by Sony Computer Entertainment in PAL only)
  - Team Buddies (PAL only)
  - Terracon (PAL only)
  - This is Football 2
  - Walt Disney's The Jungle Book Groove Party (Co-published with Disney Interactive in PAL only)
  - Who Wants to Be a Millionaire 2nd Edition (North America only)
  - Wild 9 (Co-published with Interplay in Japan only)
  - Wild Arms 2 (Japan and North America only)
  - Wipeout 3: Special Edition (PAL only)

=== 2001 ===
- Retail
  - C-12: Final Resistance
  - Disney•Pixar Monsters, Inc. Scream Team (Co-published with Disney Interactive in North America and PAL only)
  - Disney's Atlantis: The Lost Empire (Co-published with Disney Interactive)
  - Disney's Party Time with Winnie The Pooh (Co-published with Disney Interactive in PAL only)
  - Disney's The Little Mermaid II (Co-published with Disney Interactive in PAL only)
  - Formula One 2001 (PAL only)
  - Libero Grande International (Co-published with Namco in PAL only)
  - MLB 2002 (North America only)
  - NBA ShootOut 2002 (North America only)
  - NFL GameDay 2002 (North America only)
  - Point Blank 3 (Co-published with Namco in PAL only)
  - Syphon Filter 3
  - Time Crisis: Project Titan (Co-published with Namco in PAL only)
  - Twisted Metal: Small Brawl (North America only)
  - Who Wants to Be a Millionaire 3rd Edition (North America only)

=== 2002 ===
- Retail
  - Alfred Chicken (PAL only)
  - Disney's Treasure Planet (Co-published with Disney Interactive)
  - Disney's Lilo & Stitch (Co-published with Disney Interactive)
  - Final Fantasy VI (Co-published with Squaresoft in PAL only)
  - Final Fantasy Anthology (Co-published with Squaresoft in PAL only)
  - Firebugs (PAL only)
  - Formula One Arcade (PAL only)
  - Jim Henson's The Hoobs (PAL only)
  - Klonoa Beach Volleyball (Co-published with Namco in PAL only)
  - MLB 2003 (North America only)
  - NBA ShootOut 2003 (North America only)
  - NFL GameDay 2003 (North America only)
  - Peter Pan in Disney's Return to Never Land (Co-published with Disney Interactive)
  - Stuart Little 2 (North America and PAL only)
  - WRC: FIA World Rally Championship Arcade (PAL only)

=== 2003 ===
- Retail
  - Jinx (PAL only)
  - MLB 2004 (North America only)
  - NBA ShootOut 2004 (North America only)
  - NFL GameDay 2004 (North America only)

=== 2004 ===
- Retail
  - MLB 2005 (North America only)
  - NFL GameDay 2005 (North America only)

== PlayStation 2 ==
=== 2000 ===
- Retail
  - Bikkuri Mouse (Japan only)
  - Blood: The Last Vampire - Gekan (Japan only)
  - Blood: The Last Vampire - Joukan (Japan only)
  - Dead or Alive 2 (Co-published with Tecmo in PAL only)
  - FantaVision
  - I.Q. Remix+: Intelligent Qube (Japan only)
  - NCAA GameBreaker 2001 (North America only)
  - NCAA Final Four 2001 (North America only)
  - NFL GameDay 2001 (North America only)
  - Ridge Racer V (Co-published with Namco in PAL only)
  - Scandal (Japan only)
  - Tekken Tag Tournament (Co-published with Namco in PAL only)
  - TVDJ (Japan only)

=== 2001 ===
- Retail
  - AirBlade (PAL only)
  - Bravo Music: Christmas Edition (Japan only)
  - Cool Boarders 2001 (North America only)
  - ATV Offroad Fury
  - Dark Cloud
  - Extermination
  - Formula One 2001
  - Frequency (North America and PAL only)
  - Genshi no Kotoba (Japan only)
  - Gran Turismo 3: A-Spec
  - Gran Turismo Concept Tokyo 2001 (Japan only)
  - Gran Turismo Concept Tokyo-Geneva (PAL only)
  - Gran Turismo Concept Tokyo-Seoul (South-Korea only)
  - Ico
  - Jak and Daxter: The Precursor Legacy
  - Kinetica (North America only)
  - Klonoa 2: Lunatea's Veil (Co-published with Namco in PAL only)
  - Legaia 2: Duel Saga (Japan only)
  - Mad Maestro! (Japan only)
  - Mister Mosquito (Japan only)
  - MotoGP (Co-published with Namco in PAL only)
  - NBA ShootOut 2001 (North America only)
  - NCAA Final Four 2002 (North America only)
  - NFL GameDay 2002 (North America only)
  - NHL FaceOff 2001
  - Okage: Shadow King (North America and Japan only)
  - PaRappa the Rapper 2
  - Pipo Saru 2001 (Japan only)
  - Rimo-Cocoron (Japan only)
  - Sagashi ni Ikouyo (Japan only)
  - SkyGunner (Japan only)
  - Sky Odyssey (Japan and PAL only)
  - The Bouncer (Co-published with Squaresoft in PAL only)
  - The Yamanote Sen: Train Simulator Real (Japan only)
  - Time Crisis II (Co-published with Namco in PAL only)
  - This is Football 2002 (PAL and North America only)
  - Tsungai: Atonement (Japan only)
  - Twisted Metal: Black
  - Vampire Night (Co-published with Namco in PAL only)
  - Yoake no Mariko (Japan only)
  - WRC

=== 2002 ===
- Retail
  - Ace Combat: Distant Thunder (Co-published with Namco in PAL only), released as Ace Combat 04: Shattered Skies in NTSC regions.
  - Alpine Racer 3 (Co-published with Namco in PAL only)
  - Armored Core 3 (Published by Sony Interactive Entertainment in Asia excluding Japan)
  - ATV Offroad Fury 2 (North America only)
  - Boku no Natsuyasumi 2: Umi no Bokuen Hen (Japan only)
  - Bravo Music: Chou-Meikyokuban (Japan only)
  - Disney•Pixar Monsters, Inc. Scream Team (Co-published with Disney Interactive in North America and PAL only)
  - Disney's Stitch: Experiment 626
  - Disney's Treasure Planet (Co-published with Disney Interactive)
  - Drakan: The Ancients' Gates (North America and PAL only)
  - Dropship: United Peace Front (PAL only)
  - Dual Hearts (Japan only)
  - Ecco the Dolphin: Defender of the Future (Co-published with Sega in PAL only)
  - Everybody's Golf 3 (Japan and North America only)
  - Ferrari F355 Challenge (Co-published with Sega in PAL only)
  - Final Fantasy X (Co-published with Squaresoft in PAL only)
  - Formula One 2002
  - Futari no Fantasvision (Japan only)
  - Gacharoku (Japan only)
  - Headhunter (Co-published with Sega in PAL only)
  - Jet X20 (North America only)
  - Kingdom Hearts (Co-published with Squaresoft in PAL only)
  - Let's Bravo Music (Japan only)
  - MotoGP 2 (Co-published with Namco in PAL only)
  - NBA ShootOut 2003 (North America only)
  - NCAA Final Four 2003 (North America only)
  - NCAA Gamebreaker 2003 (North America only)
  - NFL GameDay 2003 (North America only)
  - NHL FaceOff 2003 (North America only)
  - Ninja Assault (Co-published with Namco in PAL only)
  - Otostaz (Japan only)
  - Peter Pan in Disney's Return to Never Land (Co-published with Disney Interactive)
  - Poinie's Poin (Japan only)
  - Popolocrois: Adventure of Beginnings (Japan only)
  - Ratchet & Clank
  - Rez (Co-published with Sega in PAL only)
  - Sly Cooper and the Thievius Raccoonus
  - Smash Court Tennis Pro Tournament (Co-published with Namco in PAL only)
  - SOCOM U.S. Navy SEALs
  - Space Channel 5 (Co-published with Sega in PAL only)
  - Space Fishermen (Japan only)
  - Surveillance Kanshisha (Japan only)
  - Tales of Destiny 2 (Published by Sony Interactive Entertainment in Asia excluding Japan)
  - Tekken 4 (Co-published with Namco in PAL only)
  - The Getaway
  - The Keihin Kyuukou: Train Simulator Real (Japan only)
  - The Mark of Kri (North America and PAL only)
  - This is Football 2003
  - Twisted Metal: Black Online
  - Virtua Fighter 4 (Co-published with Sega in PAL only)
  - Yoake no Mariko 2nd Act (Japan only)
  - Wild Arms 3 (Japan and North America only)
  - Wipeout Fusion
  - WRC II Extreme
  - XI Go (Japan only)

=== 2003 ===
- Retail
  - Amplitude (North America and PAL only)
  - Ape Escape 2 (Japan and PAL only)
  - Arc the Lad: Twilight of the Spirits
  - Dark Chronicle
  - Deka Voice (Japan only)
  - Dog's Life (PAL only)
  - Downhill Domination (North America and Japan only)
  - EverQuest Online Adventures (Published by Sony Online Entertainment in North America and by Sony Computer Entertainment in PAL only)
  - EverQuest Online Adventures: Frontiers (Published by Sony Online Entertainment in North America only)
  - EyeToy: Play
  - EyeToy: Groove
  - Flipnic: Ultimate Pinball (Japan only)
  - Formula One 2003
  - Gacharoku 2: Kondo wa Sekai Isshuu yo!! (Japan only)
  - Ghosthunter (PAL only)
  - Hardware: Online Arena (PAL and Korea only)
  - Jak II
  - Kuma Uta (Japan only)
  - Lifeline (Japan only)
  - Jampack Winter 2003 (North America only)
  - MLB 2004 (Published in North America and Japan only)
  - Mojib-Ribbon (Japan only)
  - MotoGP 3 (Co-published with Namco in PAL only)
  - My Street (North America and PAL only)
  - NBA ShootOut 2004 (North America only)
  - NCAA Final Four 2004 (North America only)
  - NFL GameDay 2004 (North America only)
  - Pac-Man World 2 (Co-published with Namco in PAL only)
  - Primal
  - Ratchet & Clank: Going Commando
  - Shibai Michi (Japan only)
  - Shinobi (Co-published with Sega in PAL only)
  - SOCOM II U.S. Navy SEALs
  - Space Channel 5: Part 2 (Co-published with Sega in PAL only, except UK)
  - This is Football 2004 (PAL and North America only)
  - Time Crisis 3 (Co-published with Namco in PAL only)
  - War of the Monsters
  - WRC 3

=== 2004 ===
- Retail
  - Arc the Lad: End of Darkness (Japan only)
  - Ape Escape: Pumped & Primed
  - Athens 2004
  - ATV Offroad Fury 3 (North America only)
  - Bakufuu Slash! Kizna Arashi (Japan only)
  - Champions of Norrath: Realms of EverQuest (Published by Sony Online Entertainment in North America only)
  - Crisis Zone (Co-published with Namco in PAL only)
  - Destruction Derby: Arenas
  - DJbox (Japan only)
  - DJ: Decks & FX (PAL only)
  - Doko Demo Issho: Toro to Nagare Boshi (Japan only)
  - Everybody's Golf 4
  - EyeToy: Antigrav (North America and PAL only)
  - EyeToy: Monkey Mania (Japan and PAL only)
  - EyeToy: Play 2 (North America and PAL only)
  - Final Fantasy XI (Co-published with Square-Enix in North America only)
  - Finny the Fish & the Seven Waters (Japan only)
  - Formula One 04
  - Gran Turismo 4: Prologue
  - Gretzky NHL 2005 (North America only)
  - I-Ninja (Co-published with Namco in PAL only)
  - Jackie Chan Adventures (PAL only)
  - Jak 3
  - Jet Li: Rise to Honor
  - Katamari Damacy (Co-published with Namco in Asia excluding Japan)
  - Kill.Switch (Co-published with Namco in PAL only)
  - Killzone
  - Koufuku Sousakan (Japan only)
  - MLB 2005 (Published in North America and Japan only)
  - Popolocrois:Adventure of the Law of the Moon (Japan only)
  - Pride of the Dragon Peace (Japan only)
  - Prince of Persia: Jikan no Suna (Co-published with Ubisoft in Japan only)
  - Ratchet & Clank: Up Your Arsenal
  - SingStar (PAL only)
  - SingStar Party (PAL only)
  - Siren
  - Sly 2: Band of Thieves
  - Smash Court Tennis Pro Tournament 2 (Co-published with Namco in PAL only)
  - Soulcalibur III (Co-published with Namco in PAL only)
  - Syphon Filter: The Omega Strain
  - The Getaway: Black Monday
  - This is Football 2004 (PAL and North America only)
  - This is Football 2005 (PAL and North America only)
  - Vib-Ripple (Japan only)
  - WRC 4

=== 2005 ===
- Retail
  - Ace Combat:Squadron Leader (Co-published with Namco in PAL only)
  - Ape Escape 3
  - Bokura no Kazoku (Japan only)
  - Brave: The Search for Spirit Dancer (Co-published with VIS Entertainment in PAL only)
  - Buzz!: The Music Quiz
  - Champions: Return to Arms (Published by Sony Online Entertainment in North America only)
  - Death by Degrees (Co-published with Namco in PAL only)
  - Disney's Peter Pan: The Legend of Never Land (Co-published with Disney Interactive in PAL only)
  - EyeToy: Chat (PAL only)
  - EyeToy: EduKids (Asia only)
  - EyeToy: Kinetic (North America and PAL only)
  - EyeToy: Play 3 (PAL only)
  - Formula One 05
  - Gaelic Games: Football (PAL only)
  - Genji: Dawn of the Samurai
  - God of War (North America and PAL only)
  - Gran Turismo 4
  - Gretzky NHL 06 (North America only)
  - Jak X: Combat Racing (North America and PAL only)
  - Kenran Butou Sai: The Mars Daybreak (Japan only)
  - Mawaza (Japan only)
  - MLB 2006 (Published in North America only)
  - MotoGP 4 (Co-published with Namco in PAL only)
  - NBA 06 (North America only)
  - Neopets: The Darkest Faerie (North America only)
  - Ratchet: Deadlocked
  - Rise of the Kasai (North America only)
  - Roland Garros Paris 2005:Powered by Smash Court Tennis (Co-published with Namco in PAL only)
  - Shadow of the Colossus
  - SingStar '80s
  - SingStar Pop
  - SingStar The Dome (PAL only)
  - Sly 3: Honor Among Thieves
  - SOCOM 3 U.S. Navy SEALs
  - Soul Calibur 3 (Co-published with Namco)
  - SpyToy (North America and PAL only)
  - Stuart Little 3: Big Photo Mode Adventure (PAL only)
  - Tekken 5 (Co-published with Namco in PAL only)
  - Wild Arms 4 (Japan only)
  - Wild Arms Alter Code: F (Japan only)
  - WRC: Rally Evolved (PAL only)
  - Xenosaga Episode II: Jenseits von Gut und böse (Co-published with Namco in PAL only)

=== 2006 ===
- Retail
  - 24: The Game (PAL only)
  - Ace Combat Zero: The Belkan War (Co-published with Bandai Namco Games in PAL only)
  - Ape Escape: Million Monkeys (Japan only)
  - ATV Offroad Fury 4
  - B-Boy (PAL only)
  - Blood+ Souyoku no Battle Rondo (Japan only)
  - Brave Story: Wataru no Bouken (Japan only)
  - Buzz!: The Big Quiz
  - Buzz!: The Sports Quiz (PAL only)
  - Buzz! Junior: Jungle Party
  - EyeToy: Kinetic Combat (PAL only)
  - EyeToy: Play Sports (PAL only)
  - Forbidden Siren 2 (Japan and PAL only)
  - Formula One 06
  - Gran Turismo 4 Online test version (Japan only)
  - Gunparade Orchestra: Ao no Shou (Japan only)
  - Gunparade Orchestra: Midori no Shou (Japan only)
  - Gunparade Orchestra: Shiro no Shou (Japan only)
  - Lemmings (PAL only)
  - MLB 06: The Show (North America and Korea only)
  - NBA 07 (North America only)
  - Rule of Rose (Japan only)
  - Shinobido: Way of the Ninja (PAL only)
  - SingStar Anthems (PAL only)
  - SingStar Legends
  - SingStar Rocks!
  - SOCOM U.S. Navy SEALs: Combined Assault
  - Tourist Trophy
  - Urban Reign (Co-published with Namco in PAL only)
  - Wild Arms 5 (Japan only)

=== 2007 ===
- Retail
  - Buzz!: The Hollywood Quiz
  - Buzz! The Mega Quiz
  - Buzz! Junior: Monster Rumble
  - Buzz! Junior: Robo Jam
  - Everybody's Tennis
  - EyeToy Astro Zoo (PAL only)
  - Gaelic Games: Football 2 (PAL only)
  - Gaelic Games: Hurling (PAL only)
  - God of War II (North America and PAL only)
  - MLB 07: The Show (North America and Korea only)
  - NBA 08 (North America and Australia only)
  - Rogue Galaxy
  - SingStar '90s
  - SingStar Amped (North America and Australia only)
  - SingStar Pop Hits 2 (PAL only)
  - SingStar Rock Ballads (PAL only)
  - SingStar R&B (PAL only)
  - Syphon Filter: Dark Mirror

=== 2008 ===
- Retail
  - Buzz!: The Pop Quiz
  - Buzz!: The Schools Quiz
  - Buzz! Junior: Ace Racers (PAL only)
  - Buzz! Junior: Dino Den (PAL only)
  - EyeToy Play: Hero (PAL only)
  - EyeToy Play: PomPom Party (PAL only)
  - MLB 08: The Show (North America only)
  - NBA 09: The Inside (North America only)
  - Ratchet & Clank: Size Matters
  - SingStar ABBA
  - SingStar BoyBands vs GirlBands
  - SingStar Country (North America only)
  - SingStar Hottest Hits (Australia only)
  - SingStar Party Hits (Australia only)
  - SingStar Pop Vol. 2 (North America only)
  - SingStar Singalong with Disney (PAL only)
  - SingStar Summer Party (PAL only)
  - Tales of Destiny: Director's Cut (Published by Sony Interactive Entertainment in Asia excluding Japan)
  - Twisted Metal: Head-On: Extra Twisted Edition (North America only)

=== 2009 ===
- Retail
  - Buzz!: Brain of the World (PAL only)
  - Cart Kings (India only)
  - Chandragupta: Warrior Prince (India only)
  - Desi Adda: Games of India (India only)
  - Ghostbusters: The Video Game (PAL only)
  - Hanuman: Boy Warrior (India only)
  - Jak and Daxter: The Lost Frontier (North America and PAL only)
  - MLB 09: The Show (North America only)
  - MotorStorm: Arctic Edge
  - Secret Agent Clank (North America and PAL only)
  - SingStar Latino (North America only)
  - SingStar Motown
  - SingStar Queen
  - SingStar Take That (UK only)
  - SingStar Vasco (Italy only)
  - Wipeout Pulse (PAL only)

=== 2010 ===
- Retail
  - MLB 10: The Show (North America and Korea only)
  - SingStar Chart Hits (Australia Only)
  - SingStar Wiggles (Australia only)
  - Street Cricket Champions (India only)
  - Syphon Filter: Logan's Shadow (North America only)

=== 2011 ===
- Retail
  - Chandragupta: Warrior Prince (India only)
  - MLB 11: The Show (North America and Korea only)
  - RA. ONE: The Game (India only)

=== 2012 ===
- Retail
  - Street Cricket Champions 2 (India only)

=== 2013 ===
- Retail
  - DON 2 The Game (India only)

== PlayStation 3 ==
=== 2006 ===
- Retail
  - Genji: Days of the Blade
  - NBA 07 (North America and Japan only)
  - Resistance: Fall of Man
- PlayStation Network
  - Blast Factor
  - Go! Sudoku
  - Gran Turismo HD Concept
  - Lemmings
  - Mainichi Issho (Japan only)

=== 2007 ===
- Retail
  - Armored Core 4 (Published by Sony Interactive Entertainment in Asia excluding Japan)
  - Boku no Natsuyasumi 3: Kitaguni Hen: Chiisana Boku no Dai Sougen (Japan only)
  - Folklore
  - Formula One Championship Edition
  - Heavenly Sword
  - Lair
  - MLB 07: The Show (North America and Korea only)
  - MotorStorm
  - NBA 08 (North America and PAL only)
  - Ninja Gaiden Sigma (Published by Sony Interactive Entertainment in Asia excluding Japan)
  - Ratchet & Clank Future: Tools of Destruction
  - Ridge Racer 7 (Co-published with Namco in PAL only)
  - SingStar
  - The Eye of Judgment
  - Uncharted: Drake's Fortune
  - Warhawk
- PlayStation Network
  - Aqua Vita (North America and PAL only)
  - Calling All Cars!
  - Everyday Shooter
  - EyeCreate
  - Feel Ski
  - Flow
  - Go! Puzzle
  - High Velocity Bowling
  - LocoRoco Cocoreccho!
  - Mesmerize Distort (North America and PAL only)
  - Mesmerize Trace (North America and PAL only)
  - Nucleus
  - Operation Creature Feature (North America and PAL only)
  - Pain (Retail version in PAL only)
  - PixelJunk Racers (North America and PAL only)
  - Piyotama
  - Snakeball
  - Super Rub 'a' Dub
  - Super Stardust HD
  - Tekken 5: Dark Resurrection (Co-published with Namco Bandai Games in PAL only)
  - The Trials of Topoq
  - Tori Emaki
  - Toy Home

=== 2008 ===
- Retail
  - Afrika (Japan only)
  - Aquanaut's Holiday: Hidden Memories (Japan only)
  - Buzz!: Quiz TV
  - Gran Turismo 5 Prologue
  - Everybody's Golf 5
  - Fallout 3 (Published by Sony Interactive Entertainment in Asia excluding Japan)
  - LittleBigPlanet
  - MLB 08: The Show (North America and Korea only)
  - MotorStorm: Pacific Rift
  - NBA 09: The Inside (North America only)
  - Resistance 2
  - SingStar ABBA
  - SingStar Vol. 2
  - SingStar Vol. 3
  - SOCOM U.S. Navy SEALs: Confrontation
  - Soulcalibur IV (Published by Sony Interactive Entertainment in Asia excluding Japan)
  - Time Crisis 4 (Co-published with Namco in PAL only)
- PlayStation Network
  - Buzz! Junior: Jungle Party (PAL and North America only)
  - Crash Commando
  - Dark Mist
  - Echochrome
  - Elefunk
  - Linger in Shadows
  - PixelJunk Eden (North America and PAL only)
  - PixelJunk Monsters (North America and PAL only)
  - PlayStation Home
  - Ratchet & Clank Future: Quest for Booty (Retail version in PAL only)
  - Siren: Blood Curse (Retail version in PAL only)
  - Sky Diving
  - The Last Guy
  - Wipeout HD

=== 2009 ===
- Retail
  - Buzz!: Brain of the World (PAL only)
  - Buzz!: Quiz World
  - Demon's Souls (Japan only)
  - Desi Adda: Games of India (India only)
  - EyePet (PAL only)
  - Ghostbusters: The Video Game (PAL only)
  - God of War Collection (North America and PAL only)
  - Infamous
  - Katamari Forever (Co-published with Namco in Asia excluding Japan)
  - Killzone 2
  - MLB 09: The Show (North America, Korea and Australia only)
  - Ratchet & Clank Future: A Crack in Time
  - SingStar Latino (North America only)
  - SingStar Motown (PAL only)
  - SingStar Queen
  - SingStar Pop Edition (PAL only)
  - SingStar Starter Pack (PAL only)
  - SingStar Take That (UK only)
  - SingStar Vasco (Italy only)
  - Tales of Vesperia (Published by Sony Interactive Entertainment in Asia excluding Japan)
  - Toro to Morimori (Japan only)
  - Uncharted 2: Among Thieves
  - Wipeout HD Fury (PAL only)
- PlayStation Network
  - .detuned
  - Bejeweled 2 (Published by Sony Online Entertainment in North America and PAL only)
  - Buzz! Junior: Dino Den (PAL only)
  - Buzz! Junior: Monster Rumble (PAL and North America only)
  - Buzz! Junior: Robo Jam (PAL and North America only)
  - Dress (Japan only)
  - Fat Princess
  - Flower
  - Gravity Crash
  - Heavy Weapon (Published by Sony Online Entertainment in North America and PAL only)
  - Hustle Kings
  - Magic Orbz (North America only)
  - Numblast
  - Peggle (Published by Sony Online Entertainment in North America and PAL only)
  - Peggle Nights (Published by Sony Online Entertainment in North America and PAL only)
  - PixelJunk Shooter (North America and PAL only)
  - Rag Doll Kung Fu: Fists of Plastic
  - Revenge of the Wounded Dragons (North America only)
  - Savage Moon
  - Switchball (Published by Sony Online Entertainment in North America and PAL only)
  - The Punisher: No Mercy
  - Trash Panic
  - Zuma (Published by Sony Online Entertainment in North America and PAL only)

=== 2010 ===
- Retail
  - Beat Sketcher
  - Buzz!: The Ultimate Music Quiz (PAL only)
  - EyePet Move Edition
  - Fallout: New Vegas (Published by Sony Interactive Entertainment in Asia excluding Japan)
  - Final Fantasy XIII (Published by Sony Interactive Entertainment in Asia excluding Japan)
  - God of War III
  - Gran Turismo 5
  - Heavy Rain
  - Heavy Rain Move Edition
  - High Velocity Bowling Move Edition (North America and Japan only)
  - Kung Fu Rider
  - Mag
  - MLB 10: The Show (North America and Korea only)
  - ModNation Racers
  - Nier (Published by Sony Interactive Entertainment in Asia excluding Japan)
  - SingStar Chart Hits (Australia only)
  - SingStar Dance
  - SingStar Guitar (PAL only)
  - The Sly Collection
  - Sports Champions
  - Start the Party!
  - The Fight: Lights Out
  - The Shoot
  - Time Crisis: Razing Storm (Co-published with Namco in PAL only)
  - TV Superstars
  - White Knight Chronicles
- PlayStation Network
  - Buzz!: Quiz Player (PAL only, free-to-play version)
  - Dead Nation
  - Eat Them!
  - echochrome ii
  - Feeding Frenzy 2: Shipwreck Showdown (Published by Sony Online Entertainment in North America and PAL only)
  - MotorStorm 3D Rift
  - PixelJunk Racers: 2nd Lap (North America and PAL only)
  - Qlione Evolve (Published by Sony Online Entertainment in North America and PAL only)
  - Sackboy's Prehistoric Moves
  - SingStar Viewer
  - Swords & Soldiers (Published by Sony Online Entertainment in North America and PAL only)
  - TerRover (Published by Sony Online Entertainment in North America and PAL only)
  - Top Darts
  - Tumble

=== 2011 ===
- Retail
  - Bleach: Soul Resurrecciòn (Japan only)
  - Call of Duty: Modern Warfare 3 (Published by Sony Interactive Entertainment in Asia excluding Japan)
  - Carnival Island
  - DC Universe Online
  - Disgaea 4 (Published by Sony Interactive Entertainment in Asia excluding Japan)
  - Disney Universe (Published by Sony Interactive Entertainment in Asia excluding Japan)
  - DanceStar Party (PAL and North America only)
  - EyePet & Friends
  - God of War: Origins Collection
  - GoldenEye 007: Reloaded (Published by Sony Interactive Entertainment in Asia excluding Japan)
  - Infamous 2
  - Killzone 3
  - LittleBigPlanet 2
  - Medieval Moves: Deadmund's Quest
  - MLB 11: The Show (North America, Korea and Australia only)
  - MotorStorm: Apocalypse (PAL and North America only)
  - Move Fitness (Retail version in PAL, Asia and Korea, only download in North America)
  - Ni No Kuni: Wrath of the White Witch (Published by Sony Interactive Entertainment in Asia excluding Japan)
  - No More Heroes: Heroes' Paradise (Published by Sony Interactive Entertainment in Asia excluding Japan)
  - PlayStation Move Ape Escape (Retail version in Japan, Asia and PAL, only download in North America and UK)
  - PlayStation Move Heroes
  - Ratchet & Clank: All 4 One
  - Resistance 3
  - SingStar Back to the '80s (PAL only)
  - SOCOM 4
  - Start the Party! Save the World (Retail version in PAL and Asia only)
  - Tekken Hybrid (Co-published with Namco Bandai Games in PAL only)
  - The Ico & Shadow of the Colossus Collection
  - Uncharted 3: Drake's Deception
  - White Knight Chronicles 2
- PlayStation Network
  - Acceleration of Suguri X Edition (Published by Sony Online Entertainment)
  - Akimi Village (Published by Sony Online Entertainment in North America and PAL only)
  - DC Universe Online (Published by Sony Online Entertainment, free-to-play version)
  - Free Realms (Published by Sony Online Entertainment in North and PAL only)
  - Infamous: Festival of Blood
  - Payday: The Heist (Published by Sony Online Entertainment in North America and PAL only)
  - PixelJunk Shooter 2 (North America and PAL only)
  - PixelJunk SideScroller (North America and PAL only)
  - Plants vs. Zombies (Published by Sony Online Entertainment in North America and PAL only)
  - RA. ONE: The Game (PAL only, retail version in India only)
  - Rochard (Published by Sony Online Entertainment in North America and PAL only)
  - Sideway New York (Published by Sony Online Entertainment in North America and PAL only)
  - Slam Bolt Scrappers (Published by Sony Online Entertainment in North America and PAL only)

=== 2012 ===
- Retail
  - Call of Duty: Black Ops II (Published by Sony Interactive Entertainment in Asia excluding Japan)
  - Disney Epic Mickey 2: The Power of Two (Published by Sony Interactive Entertainment in Asia excluding Japan)
  - DanceStar Party Hits (PAL only)
  - Final Fantasy XIII-2 (Published by Sony Interactive Entertainment in Asia excluding Japan)
  - God of War Saga (North America only)
  - Hitman: Absolution (Published by Sony Interactive Entertainment in Asia excluding Japan)
  - Jak and Daxter Collection
  - Journey Collector's Edition
  - Killzone Trilogy
  - LittleBigPlanet Karting
  - Lollipop Chainsaw (Published by Sony Interactive Entertainment in Asia excluding Japan)
  - MLB 12: The Show (North America, Korea and Australia only)
  - Persona 4 Arena (Published by Sony Interactive Entertainment in Asia excluding Japan)
  - PlayStation All-Stars Battle Royale
  - Ratchet & Clank Collection
  - Ratchet & Clank: Full Frontal Assault
  - Sleeping Dogs (Published by Sony Interactive Entertainment in Asia excluding Japan)
  - Sorcery
  - Sports Champions 2
  - Starhawk
  - Street Fighter X Tekken (Special Edition in Asia excluding Japan)
  - Twisted Metal
  - Wonderbook: Book of Spells (PAL and North America only)
- PlayStation Network
  - Datura
  - Journey
  - Killzone (Remastered version)
  - Killzone 3 Multiplayer
  - Malicious
  - MotorStorm RC
  - Move Street Cricket (PAL only, retail version in India only)
  - PixelJunk 4am (North America and PAL only)
  - SingStar (Free-to-play version)
  - Sound Shapes
  - The Unfinished Swan
  - Tokyo Jungle (Retail version in Japan only)
  - When Vikings Attack!

=== 2013 ===
- Retail
  - Beyond: Two Souls
  - Diablo III (Published by Sony Interactive Entertainment in Asia excluding Japan)
  - God of War: Ascension
  - Gran Turismo 6
  - Invizimals: The Lost Kingdom (Retail version in PAL only, download only in North America 1 year later)
  - Kingdom Hearts HD 1.5 Remix (Published by Sony Interactive Entertainment in Asia excluding Japan)
  - Minecraft: PlayStation 3 Edition
  - MLB 13: The Show (Retail version in North America, Korea and Australia, download only in PAL)
  - Puppeteer
  - Ragnarok Odyssey (Published by Sony Interactive Entertainment in Asia excluding Japan)
  - Ratchet & Clank: Into the Nexus
  - Sly Cooper: Thieves in Time
  - The Last of Us
  - Tomb Raider (2013) (Published by Sony Interactive Entertainment in Asia excluding Japan)
  - Wonderbook: Book of Potions (PAL and North America only)
  - Wonderbook: Diggs Nightcrawler (PAL and North America only)
  - Wonderbook: Walking with Dinosaurs (PAL and North America only)
- PlayStation Network
  - Bentley's Hackpack
  - DanceStar Digital (PAL only, free-to-play version)
  - Dare to Fly (PAL only)
  - Doki-Doki Universe
  - Dust 514
  - Everybody's Golf 6 (Retail version in Japan only)
  - Kite Fight (PAL only)
  - Move Street Cricket II (PAL only, retail version in India only)
  - Pro Foosball
  - Rain (Retail version in Japan only)
  - Ratchet: Deadlocked (Remastered version)
  - Uncharted 3: Drake's Deception Multiplayer Free-to-play

=== 2014 ===
- Retail
  - The Evil Within (Published by Sony Interactive Entertainment in Asia excluding Japan)
  - Final Fantasy X/X-2 HD Remaster (Published by Sony Interactive Entertainment in Asia excluding Japan)
  - Guilty Gear Xrd Sign (Published by Sony Interactive Entertainment in Asia excluding Japan)
  - Kingdom Hearts HD 2.5 Remix (Published by Sony Interactive Entertainment in Asia excluding Japan)
  - Lightning Returns: Final Fantasy XIII (Published by Sony Interactive Entertainment in Asia excluding Japan)
  - LittleBigPlanet 3
  - MLB 14: The Show (Retail version in North America, download only in PAL)
  - Persona 4 Arena Ultimax (Published by Sony Interactive Entertainment in Asia excluding Japan)
  - Ratchet & Clank: Ginga Saikyo Tristar Pack (Japan only)
- PlayStation Network
  - CounterSpy
  - Entwined
  - Hohokum
  - Pain (Free-to-play version)
  - Resogun
  - SingStar

=== 2015 ===
- Retail
  - Call of Duty: Black Ops III (Published by Sony Computer Entertainment in Japan only)
  - MLB 15: The Show
- PlayStation Network
  - Helldivers

=== 2016 ===
- Retail
  - MLB The Show 16

== PlayStation 4 ==
=== 2013 ===
- Retail
  - Killzone: Shadow Fall
  - Knack
  - The Playroom (pre-installed on the console)
- PlayStation Network
  - DC Universe Online (Published by Sony Online Entertainment)
  - Doki-Doki Universe
  - Escape Plan
  - Flow
  - Flower
  - Resogun
  - Sound Shapes

=== 2014 ===
- Retail
  - Child of Light (Published by Sony Interactive Entertainment in Asia excluding Japan)
  - Destiny (Published by Sony Computer Entertainment in Japan only)
  - Diablo III (Published by Sony Interactive Entertainment in Asia excluding Japan)
  - Driveclub
  - The Evil Within (Published by Sony Interactive Entertainment in Asia excluding Japan)
  - Guilty Gear Xrd Sign (Published by Sony Interactive Entertainment in Asia excluding Japan)
  - Infamous First Light (Retail version in PAL, download only in North America)
  - Infamous Second Son
  - LittleBigPlanet 3
  - Lords of the Fallen (Published by Sony Interactive Entertainment in Asia excluding Japan)
  - Minecraft
  - MLB 14: The Show (Retail version in North America, download only in PAL)
  - Rayman Legends (Published by Sony Interactive Entertainment in Asia excluding Japan)
  - Sleeping Dogs: Definitive Edition (Published by Sony Interactive Entertainment in Asia excluding Japan)
  - The Last of Us Remastered
  - Tomb Raider: Definitive Edition (Published by Sony Interactive Entertainment in Asia excluding Japan)
- PlayStation Network
  - CounterSpy
  - Dead Nation: Apocalypse Edition
  - Entwined
  - Hatsune Miku: Magical Mirai 2014 (Japan only)
  - Hohokum
  - Killzone: Shadow Fall Intercept (Standalone version)
  - SingStar
  - The Unfinished Swan

=== 2015 ===
- Retail
  - Bloodborne
  - Bloodborne The Old Hunters Edition (Retail version in PAL, Japan and Asia only)
  - Call of Duty: Black Ops III (Published by Sony Computer Entertainment in Japan only)
  - Final Fantasy Type-0 HD (Published by Sony Interactive Entertainment in Asia excluding Japan)
  - Final Fantasy X/X-2 HD Remaster (Published by Sony Interactive Entertainment in Asia excluding Japan)
  - God of War III Remastered
  - Helldivers: Super-Earth Ultimate Edition
  - Journey Collector's Edition
  - Megadimension Neptunia VII (Published by Sony Interactive Entertainment in Asia excluding Japan)
  - MLB 15: The Show (Retail version in North America, download only in PAL)
  - Tearaway Unfolded
  - The Order: 1886
  - Transformers: Devastation (Published by Sony Interactive Entertainment in Asia excluding Japan)
  - Uncharted: The Nathan Drake Collection
  - Until Dawn
- PlayStation Network
  - Beyond: Two Souls
  - Destiny: The Taken King (Published by Sony Computer Entertainment in Japan only)
  - Driveclub Bikes (Standalone version)
  - Everybody's Gone to the Rapture
  - Fat Princess Adventures
  - Guns Up!
  - Hatsune Miku Magical Mirai 2015 (Japan only)
  - Helldivers
  - Hustle Kings
  - Journey
  - Ultra Street Fighter IV (Published by Sony Computer Entertainment outside Japan)
  - Super Stardust Ultra
  - The Last of Us: Left Behind (Standalone version)

=== 2016 ===
- Retail
  - Call of Duty: Modern Warfare Remastered (Published by Sony Interactive Entertainment in Japan)
  - Call of Duty: Infinite Warfare (Published by Sony Interactive Entertainment in Japan)
  - Final Fantasy XV (Published by Sony Interactive Entertainment in Asia excluding Japan)
  - Gravity Rush Remastered
  - Guilty Gear Xrd Revelator (Published by Sony Interactive Entertainment in Asia excluding Japan)
  - Here They Lie (Retail version in PAL, download only in North America) (PlayStation VR support)
  - Life Is Strange (Published by Sony Interactive Entertainment in Asia excluding Japan)
  - MLB The Show 16
  - No Man's Sky (Co-published with Hello Games in PAL only)
  - Paragon Essentials Edition (Retail version)
  - Ratchet & Clank
  - Shadow of the Beast (Retail version in Asia, download only in PAL and North America)
  - The Heavy Rain & Beyond: Two Souls Collection
  - The Last Guardian
  - Star Ocean: Integrity and Faithlessness (Published by Sony Interactive Entertainment in Asia excluding Japan)
  - Street Fighter V (Published by Sony Interactive Entertainment in Asia excluding Japan)
  - Uncharted: Drake's Fortune Remastered (Retail version in PAL, download only in North America)
  - Uncharted 2: Among Thieves Remastered (Retail version in PAL, download only in North America)
  - Uncharted 3: Drake's Deception Remastered (Retail version in PAL, download only in North America)
  - Uncharted 4: A Thief's End
  - World of Final Fantasy (Published by Sony Interactive Entertainment in Asia excluding Japan)
- PlayStation Network
  - Alienation
  - Bound (PlayStation VR support)
  - Hardware: Rivals
  - Heavy Rain
  - Kill Strain
  - The Tomorrow Children
- PlayStation VR
  - Battlezone (Retail version)
  - Call of Duty: Infinite Warfare Jackal Assault VR Experience (Published by Sony Interactive Entertainment in Japan)
  - Don't Be Afraid -Biohazard × L’Arc-en-Ciel on PlayStation VR- (Japan only)
  - Driveclub VR
  - Eve: Valkyrie (Retail version)
  - Hustle Kings VR (Retail version in PAL, download only in North America)
  - Joysound VR (Japan only)
  - PlayStation VR Worlds
  - RIGS: Mechanized Combat League
  - Robinson: The Journey (Retail version)
  - Shin Godzilla Special Demo Contents (Japan only)
  - Super Stardust Ultra VR (Retail version in PAL, download only in North America)
  - The Playroom VR (Download only)
  - Tumble VR (Download only)
  - Until Dawn: Rush of Blood

=== 2017 ===
- Retail
  - Call of Duty: WWII (Published by Sony Interactive Entertainment in Japan only)
  - Crash Bandicoot N. Sane Trilogy (Published by Sony Interactive Entertainment in Japan only)
  - Destiny 2 (Published by Sony Interactive Entertainment in Japan only)
  - Everybody's Golf
  - The Evil Within 2 (Published by Sony Interactive Entertainment in Asia excluding Japan)
  - Final Fantasy XII: The Zodiac Age (Published by Sony Interactive Entertainment in Asia excluding Japan)
  - Gran Turismo Sport (PlayStation VR support)
  - Gravity Rush 2
  - Guilty Gear Xrd Rev 2 (Published by Sony Interactive Entertainment in Asia excluding Japan)
  - Horizon Zero Dawn
  - Horizon Zero Dawn: Complete Edition
  - Kingdom Hearts HD 1.5 + 2.5 Remix (Published by Sony Interactive Entertainment in Asia excluding Japan)
  - Kingdom Hearts HD 2.8 Final Chapter Prologue (Published by Sony Interactive Entertainment in Asia excluding Japan)
  - Knack II
  - LocoRoco Remastered (Retail version in Asia, download only internationally)
  - LocoRoco 2 Remastered (Retail version in Asia, download only internationally)
  - Matterfall (Retail version in PAL, download only in North America)
  - MLB The Show 17
  - Nier: Automata (Published by Sony Interactive Entertainment in Asia excluding Japan)
  - Nioh (Published by Sony Interactive Entertainment outside Japan)
  - PaRappa the Rapper Remastered (Retail version in Asia, download only internationally)
  - Patapon Remastered (Retail version in Asia, download only internationally)
  - Uncharted: The Lost Legacy
  - Wipeout Omega Collection
- PlayStation Network
  - Drawn to Death
  - Jak and Daxter Bundle (North America and PAL only)
  - Malicious Fallen (Published by Sony Interactive Entertainment outside Japan)
  - Stifled
- PlayStation VR
  - Air Force Special Ops: Nightfall (Download only)
  - Farpoint
  - Honkowa Presents: Nogizaka46 VR Horror House (only available in Japan)
  - Japan Studio VR Music Festival (only available in Japan)
  - Joshua Bell VR Experience (Download only)
  - Kamen Rider Ex-Aid: Maboroshiyume VR (only available in Japan)
  - Kamen Rider Ex-Aid: True Ending (only available in Japan)
  - No Heroes Allowed! VR (Retail version in Asia, download only internationally)
  - StarBlood Arena
  - The Last Guardian VR Demo (Download only)
  - The Virtual Orchestra (Download only)
- PlayLink
  - Hidden Agenda
  - Knowledge is Power
  - SingStar Celebration
  - That's You!

=== 2018 ===
- Retail
  - Call of Duty: Black Ops 4 (Published by Sony Interactive Entertainment in Japan only)
  - Detroit: Become Human
  - Dissidia Final Fantasy NT (Published by Sony Interactive Entertainment in Asia excluding Japan)
  - Dragon Quest XI (Published by Sony Interactive Entertainment in Asia excluding Japan)
  - God of War
  - Marvel's Spider-Man
  - MLB The Show 18
  - Quantic Dream Collection (North America only)
  - Shadow of the Colossus
  - Sword Art Online: Lost Song (Published by Sony Interactive Entertainment in Asia excluding Japan)
  - Tetris Effect (Retail Version)
  - Wipeout Omega Collection (PlayStation VR support)
- PlayStation Network
  - World of Warriors
- PlayStation VR
  - Animal Force (Asia and PAL only)
  - Astro Bot Rescue Mission
  - Bravo Team
  - Creed: Rise to Glory (US only)
  - Déraciné
  - Firewall: Zero Hour
  - Theater Room VR (Japan only)
  - The Detective invisible (Japan only)
  - The Inpatient
  - Track Lab
- PlayLink
  - Chimparty
  - Frantics
  - Knowledge is Power: Decades

=== 2019 ===
- Retail
  - Concrete Genie (PlayStation VR support)
  - Days Gone
  - Death Stranding
  - Kingdom Hearts III (Published by Sony Interactive Entertainment in Asia excluding Japan)
  - MediEvil
  - MLB The Show 19
  - Monkey King: Hero Is Back (Japan and Asia only)
  - Sekiro: Shadows Die Twice (Published by Sony Interactive Entertainment in Asia excluding Japan)
- PlayStation Network
  - Erica
  - ReadySet Heroes
- PlayStation VR
  - Blood & Truth
  - Everybody's Golf VR
  - Hikaru Utada Laughter in the Dark Tour 2018 (Download only)
  - Immortal Legacy: The Jade Cipher

=== 2020 ===
- Retail
  - Dreams (PlayStation VR support)
  - Final Fantasy VII Remake (Published by Sony Interactive Entertainment in Indonesia)
  - Ghost of Tsushima
  - Marvel's Spider-Man: Miles Morales
  - MLB The Show 20
  - Nioh 2 (Published by Sony Interactive Entertainment outside Asia)
  - Predator: Hunting Grounds
  - Sackboy: A Big Adventure
  - The Last of Us Part II
- PlayStation Network
  - Patapon 2 Remastered
- PlayStation VR
  - Marvel's Iron Man VR
  - Tilt Brush

=== 2021 ===
- Retail
  - Call of Duty: Vanguard (Published by Sony Interactive Entertainment in Japan)
  - Ghost of Tsushima Director's Cut
  - MLB The Show 21
- PlayStation Network
  - Ghost of Tsushima: Legends

=== 2022 ===
- Retail
  - God of War Ragnarök
  - Gran Turismo 7
  - Horizon Forbidden West
  - MLB The Show 22

=== 2023 ===
- Retail
  - MLB The Show 23

=== 2024 ===
- PlayStation Network
  - MLB The Show 24
  - My First Gran Turismo

=== 2026 ===
- PlayStation Network
  - God of War Sons of Sparta

== PlayStation 5 ==
=== 2020 ===
- Retail
  - Astro's Playroom (Note: Comes pre-loaded on PlayStation 5 system)
  - Demon's Souls
  - Sackboy: A Big Adventure
  - Marvel's Spider-Man: Miles Morales
  - Marvel's Spider-Man Remastered

=== 2021 ===
- Retail
  - Destruction AllStars (Note: Download only)
  - MLB The Show 21
  - Returnal
  - Ratchet & Clank: Rift Apart
  - Ghost of Tsushima Director's Cut
  - Death Stranding Director's Cut
  - Nioh Remastered
  - Nioh 2 Remastered
  - The Nioh Collection
- PlayStation Network
  - Ghost of Tsushima: Legends

=== 2022 ===
- Retail
  - Uncharted: Legacy of Thieves Collection
  - Horizon Forbidden West
  - Gran Turismo 7 (Note: PlayStation VR2 support)
  - MLB The Show 22
  - The Last of Us Part I
  - God of War Ragnarök

=== 2023 ===
- Retail
  - MLB The Show 23
  - Horizon Forbidden West: Complete Edition
  - Marvel's Spider-Man 2
  - Rise of the Ronin
- PlayStation VR2
  - Horizon Call of the Mountain
  - Firewall Ultra

=== 2024 ===
- Retail
  - The Last of Us Part II Remastered
  - Stellar Blade
  - Helldivers II
  - MLB The Show 24
  - Concord
  - Astro Bot
  - Until Dawn
  - Horizon Zero Dawn Remastered
  - Lego Horizon Adventures
- PlayStation Network
  - My First Gran Turismo

=== 2025 ===
- Retail
  - MLB The Show 25
  - Death Stranding 2: On the Beach
  - Lost Soul Aside
  - Ghost of Yōtei
- PlayStation Network
  - Days Gone Remastered
  - Climate Station
  - Midnight Murder Club

=== 2026 ===
- Retail
  - Marathon
  - MLB The Show 26
  - Saros
  - Marvel Tōkon: Fighting Souls
  - Marvel's Wolverine
- PlayStation Network
  - God of War Sons of Sparta

=== 2027 ===
- Retail
  - Until Dawn 2
  - God of War Laufey
  - Daba: Land of Water Scar
  - Kena: Scars of Kosmora
  - MLB The Show 27

=== TBA ===
- Retail
  - 4:LOOP
  - Convallaria
  - God of War Trilogy Remake
  - Horizon Hunters Gathering
  - Intergalactic: The Heretic Prophet
  - Star Wars: Knights of the Old Republic Remake

=== Classics Catalog ===
Title	Developer(s)	Release date			Ref.
Title	Developer(s)	JP	NA	PAL	Ref.
PlayStation
Ape Escape	Sony Interactive Entertainment	June 2, 2022	June 13, 2022	June 13, 2022	
Everybody's Golf	Camelot Software Planning	June 2, 2022	June 13, 2022	June 13, 2022	
I.Q.: Intelligent Qube	epics	June 2, 2022	June 13, 2022	June 13, 2022	
Jumping Flash!	Exact	June 2, 2022	June 13, 2022	June 13, 2022	
Syphon Filter	Eidetic	June 2, 2022	June 13, 2022	June 13, 2022	
Wild Arms	Media.Vision	June 2, 2022	June 13, 2022	June 13, 2022	
Syphon Filter 2	Eidetic	-	September 20, 2022	September 20, 2022	
Everybody's Golf 2	Clap Hanz	January 17, 2023	January 17, 2023	January 17, 2023	
Syphon Filter 3	Bend Studio	January 17, 2023	January 17, 2023	January 17, 2023	
Wild Arms 2	Media.Vision	February 21, 2023	February 21, 2023	February 21, 2023	
The Legend of Dragoon	Sony Interactive Entertainment	February 21, 2023	February 21, 2023	February 21, 2023	
Twisted Metal	SingleTrac	July 18, 2023	July 18, 2023	July 18, 2023	
Twisted Metal 2	SingleTrac	July 18, 2023	July 18, 2023	July 18, 2023	
I.Q. Final	epics	October 17, 2023	October 17, 2023	October 17, 2023	
Jet Moto	SingleTrac	November 21, 2023	November 21, 2023	November 21, 2023	
Rally Cross	Sony Interactive Studios America	January 16, 2024	January 16, 2024	January 16, 2024	
Jet Moto 2	SingleTrac	February 20, 2024	February 20, 2024	February 20, 2024	
MediEvil	Sony Interactive Entertainment Europe	April 16, 2024	April 16, 2024	April 16, 2024	
2Xtreme	Sony Interactive Studios America	May 21, 2024	May 21, 2024	May 21, 2024	
G-Police	Psygnosis	May 21, 2024	May 21, 2024	May 21, 2024	
MediEvil II	Sony Interactive Entertainment Europe	-	January 21, 2025	January 21, 2025	
Twisted Metal III	989 Studios	-	July 15, 2025	July 15, 2025	
Twisted Metal 4	989 Studios	-	July 15, 2025	July 15, 2025	
PSP
Echochrome	Will	June 2, 2022	June 13, 2022	June 13, 2022	
Super Stardust Portable	Housemarque	June 23, 2022	June 23, 2022	June 23, 2022	
echoshift	Artoon	July 19, 2022	July 19, 2022	July 19, 2022	
LocoRoco Midnight Carnival	Japan Studio	July 19, 2022	July 19, 2022	July 19, 2022	
No Heroes Allowed!	Acquire	July 19, 2022	July 19, 2022	July 19, 2022	
Kingdom of Paradise	Climax Entertainment	September 20, 2022	September 20, 2022	September 20, 2022	
Pinball Heroes	San Diego Studio	December 20, 2022	December 20, 2022	December 20, 2022	
Ape Academy 2	Shift	March 21, 2023	March 21, 2023	March 21, 2023	
Syphon Filter: Dark Mirror	Bend Studio	-	March 21, 2023	March 21, 2023	
Blade Dancer: Lineage of Light	Hit Maker	May 16, 2023	May 16, 2023	May 16, 2023	
Pursuit Force	Bigbig Studios	May 16, 2023	May 16, 2023	May 16, 2023	
Coded Soul: Uketsugareshi Idea	Gaia	June 20, 2023	-	-	
Killzone: Liberation	Guerrilla Games	-	June 20, 2023	June 20, 2023	
Gravity Crash Portable	Just Add Water	July 18, 2023	July 18, 2023	July 18, 2023	
Ape Escape: On the Loose	SIMS	August 15, 2023	August 15, 2023	August 15, 2023	
MediEvil: Resurrection	Cambridge Studio	August 15, 2023	August 15, 2023	August 15, 2023	
Pursuit Force: Extreme Justice	Bigbig Studios	August 15, 2023	August 15, 2023	August 15, 2023	
Ape Academy	Shift	October 17, 2023	October 17, 2023	October 17, 2023	
Resistance: Retribution	Bend Studio	February 20, 2024	February 20, 2024	February 20, 2024	
Jak and Daxter The Lost Frontier	High Impact Games	March 19, 2024	March 19, 2024	March 19, 2024	
Ore no Shikabane o Koete Yuke	Alfa System	April 16, 2024	-	-	
Daxter	Ready at Dawn	-	June 18, 2024	June 18, 2024	
Jeanne d’Arc	Level-5	July 16, 2024	July 16, 2024	July 16, 2024	
Ratchet & Clank: Size Matters	High Impact Games	July 16, 2024	July 16, 2024	July 16, 2024	
Secret Agent Clank	High Impact Games	September 17, 2024	September 17, 2024	September 17, 2024	
Patapon 3	Pyramid	February 18, 2025	February 18, 2025	February 18, 2025	
PlayStation 2
Sly Cooper and the Thievius Raccoonus	Sucker Punch Productions	June 11, 2024	June 11, 2024	June 11, 2024	
Ghosthunter	Cambridge Studio	June 18, 2024	June 18, 2024	June 18, 2024	
Mister Mosquito	Zoom	September 17, 2024	September 17, 2024	September 17, 2024	
SkyGunner	PixelArts	September 17, 2024	September 17, 2024	September 17, 2024	
Siren	Sony Computer Entertainment Japan	October 15, 2024	October 15, 2024	October 15, 2024	
Jak and Daxter: The Precursor Legacy	Naughty Dog	December 10, 2024	December 10, 2024	December 10, 2024	
Sly 2: Band of Thieves	Sucker Punch Productions	December 10, 2024	December 10, 2024	December 10, 2024	
Sly 3: Honour Among Thieves	Sucker Punch Productions	December 10, 2024	December 10, 2024	December 10, 2024	
War of the Monsters	Incognito Entertainment	April 15, 2025	April 15, 2025	April 15, 2025	
Wild Arms 4	Media.Vision	April 21, 2026	April 21, 2026	April 21, 2026	

== Nintendo Switch ==
=== 2024 ===
- Nintendo eShop
  - Lego Horizon Adventures (Published by PlayStation Publishing)

== Xbox Series X|S ==
=== 2025 ===
- Xbox Store
  - Helldivers 2 (Published by PlayStation Publishing)

=== 2026 ===
- Retail
  - Marathon (Published by Bungie)

== PlayStation Portable ==
=== 2004 ===
- Retail
  - Doko Demo Issho (Japan only)

=== 2005 ===
- Retail
  - Ape Escape Academy
  - Ape Escape: On the Loose
  - Archer Maclean's Mercury (Japan only)
  - ATV Offroad Fury: Blazin' Trails (North America only)
  - Everybody's Golf Portable
  - F1 Grand Prix
  - Fired Up
  - Glorace: Phantastic Carnival (South Korea only)
  - Go! Sudoku (Japan and PAL only)
  - Gretzky NHL (North America only)
  - Gretzky NHL 06 (North America only)
  - Hand Dic (South Korea only)
  - MediEvil: Resurrection
  - MLB (North America and South Korea only)
  - MLB 2006 (North America only)
  - Namco Museum Battle Collection (Co-published with Namco in PAL only)
  - NBA (North America only)
  - NBA 06 (North America only)
  - PoPoLoCrois (Japan only)
  - Pursuit Force (PAL and North America only)
  - Ridge Racer (Co-published with Namco in PAL only)
  - SOCOM U.S. Navy SEALs: Fireteam Bravo
  - The Con (North America, South Korea and PAL only)
  - Twisted Metal: Head-On
  - Untold Legends: Brotherhood of the Blade (Published by Sony Online Entertainment in North America only)
  - Wipeout Pure
  - World Tour Soccer: Challenge Edition
  - WRC: FIA World Rally Championship (PAL only)
  - Work Time Fun (Japan only)

=== 2006 ===
- Retail
  - Ace Combat X: Skies of Deception (Co-published with Namco in PAL only)
  - Ape Escape Academy 2 (Japan and PAL only)
  - Ape Escape Racing (Japan and Asia only)
  - ATV Offroad Fury Pro
  - B-Boy (PAL only)
  - Blade Dancer: Lineage of Light (Japan only)
  - Blood+ Final Piece (Japan only)
  - Blood: The Last Vampire (Japan only)
  - Boku no Natsuyasumi (Japan only)
  - Bomberman: Bakufuu Sentai Bombermen (Japan Only)
  - Brave Story (Japan only)
  - Daxter
  - Field Commander (Published by Sony Online Entertainment in North America only)
  - Formula One 06 (Japan and PAL only)
  - Gangs of London
  - Killzone: Liberation
  - Kingdom of Paradise
  - Lemmings
  - LocoRoco
  - Mercury Meltdown (Japan only)
  - MLB 06: The Show (North America and Japan only)
  - Monster Kingdom: Jewel Summoner (Japan only)
  - MotoGP (Co-published with Namco in PAL only)
  - NBA 07 (North America only)
  - Neopets: Petpet Adventures: The Wand of Wishing (North America only)
  - Passport to... Amsterdam (PAL only)
  - Passport to... Barcelona (PAL only)
  - Passport to... London (PAL only)
  - Passport to... Paris (PAL only)
  - Passport to... Prague (PAL only)
  - Passport to... Rome (PAL only)
  - Ridge Racer 2 (Co-published with Namco in PAL only)
  - SOCOM U.S. Navy SEALs: Fireteam Bravo 2
  - Syphon Filter: Dark Mirror
  - Talkman
  - Tekken: Dark Resurrection (Co-published with Namco Bandai Games in PAL only)
  - Tenchi no Mon 2: Busouden (Japan only)
  - Untold Legends: The Warrior's Code (Published by Sony Online Entertainment in North America only)
  - World Tour Soccer 06
  - XI Coliseum (Japan only)

=== 2007 ===
- Retail
  - Ape Escape: SaruSaru Big Mission (Japan only)
  - Jeanne d'Arc (Japan and North America only)
  - MLB 07: The Show (North America and South Korea only)
  - NBA 08 (North America only)
  - PaRappa the Rapper
  - Pursuit Force: Extreme Justice (PAL and North America only)
  - Ratchet & Clank: Size Matters
  - Rezel Cross (Japan only)
  - Shinobido: Tales of the Ninja (Japan and PAL only)
  - Smash Court Tennis 3 (Co-published with Namco in PAL only)
  - SOCOM U.S. Navy SEALs: Tactical Strike
  - Syphon Filter: Logan's Shadow
  - What Did I Do to Deserve This, My Lord? (Japan only)
  - Wild Arms XF (Japan only)
  - Wipeout Pulse
- PlayStation Network
  - Ape Quest (Retail version in Japan only)
  - Beats
  - Go! Puzzle
  - Syphon Filter: Combat Ops

=== 2008 ===
- Retail
  - Buzz!: Brain Bender (PAL only)
  - Buzz!: Master Quiz
  - Coded Soul: Uketsugareshi Idea (Japan and South Korea only)
  - Echochrome (Retail version in Japan and PAL only)
  - Everybody's Golf Portable 2
  - God of War: Chains of Olympus (North America and PAL only)
  - LocoRoco 2
  - MLB 08: The Show (North America and South Korea only)
  - NBA 09: The Inside (North America only)
  - Patapon
  - Secret Agent Clank
  - What Did I Do to Deserve This, My Lord? (Japan only)
- PlayStation Network
  - Brain Challenge (North America only)
  - Everyday Shooter
  - Flow
  - Mainichi Issho Portable (Japan only)
  - Super Stardust Portable

=== 2009 ===
- Retail
  - Boku no Natsuyasumi 4: Seitouchi Shounen Tanteidan, Boku to Himitsu no Chizu (Japan only)
  - Buzz!: Brain of the World (PAL only)
  - Buzz!: Quiz World
  - Chandrugpta: Warrior Prince (India only)
  - Desi Adda: Games of India (India only)
  - Enkaku Sōsa: Shinjitsu e no 23 Nichikan (Japan only)
  - Ghostbusters: The Video Game (PAL only)
  - Gran Turismo
  - Invizimals (PAL and North America only)
  - Jak and Daxter: The Lost Frontier
  - LittleBigPlanet
  - MLB 09: The Show (North America, Korea and Australia only)
  - NBA 10 The Inside (North America only)
  - MotorStorm: Arctic Edge
  - Patapon 2
  - Resistance: Retribution
- PlayStation Network
  - LocoRoco Midnight Carnival
  - Numblast
  - Pinball Heroes
  - PixelJunk Monsters Deluxe (North America and PAL only)
  - Savage Moon The Hera Campaign

=== 2010 ===
- Retail
  - Boku no Natsuyasumi 2 (Japan only)
  - Echoshift (Retail version in Japan and PAL only)
  - Everybody's Tennis Portable
  - EyePet
  - Fat Princess: Fistful of Cake (PAL and North America only)
  - God of War: Ghost of Sparta
  - Invizimals: Shadow Zone (PAL and North America only)
  - Jungle Party
  - MLB 10: The Show (North America and Korea only)
  - ModNation Racers
  - Patito Feo: el juego màs bonito (PAL only: Spain, Portugal and Italy)
  - SOCOM U.S. Navy SEALs: Fireteam Bravo 3
  - Street Cricket Champions (India only)
  - The Eye of Judgment: Legends (Retail version in Japan and PAL only)
- PlayStation Network
  - Everybody's Stress Buster (Retail version in Japan and Asia only)
  - Gravity Crash
  - No Heroes Allowed! (Retail version in Japan only)
  - Patchwork Heroes (Retail version in Japan only)
  - Pinball Heroes Bundle 2

=== 2011 ===
- Retail
  - Buzz!: The Ultimate Music Quiz (PAL only)
  - Disney•Pixar Cars 2 (PAL and North America only)
  - Cart Kings (India only)
  - EyePet Adventures (PAL only)
  - Geronimo Stilton in The Kingdom of Fantasy The Videogame (Retail version in PAL, download only in North America)
  - Invizimals: The Lost Tribes (Retail version in PAL, download only in North America released 3 years later)
  - MLB 11: The Show (North America, South Korea and Australia only)
  - Ore no Shikabane wo Koete Yuke (Japan only)
  - Patapon 3
  - The Mystery Team (PAL only)
  - White Knight Chronicles: Origins (Japan and PAL only)

=== 2012 ===
- Retail
  - Geronimo Stilton: Return to The Kingdom of Fantasy The Videogame (Retail version in PAL, download only in North America)
  - Phineas and Ferb: Across the 2nd Dimension (PAL and North America only)
  - Street Cricket Champions 2 (India only)

=== 2013 ===
- Retail
  - Don 2: The Game (India only)
- PlayStation Network
  - Invizimals: Hidden Challenges (PAL only)

== PlayStation Vita ==
=== 2011 ===
- PlayStation Network
  - Toro's Friend Network

=== 2012 ===
- Retail
  - Everybody's Golf 6
  - Gravity Rush
  - LittleBigPlanet PS Vita
  - Little Deviants
  - MLB 12: The Show (Retail version in North America, Korea and Australia, download only in PAL)
  - ModNation Racers: Road Trip
  - Persona 4 Golden (Published by Sony Interactive Entertainment in Asia excluding Japan)
  - PlayStation All-Stars Battle Royale
  - Reality Fighters
  - Resistance: Burning Skies
  - Smart As...
  - Uncharted: Golden Abyss
  - Unit 13
  - Wipeout 2048
- PlayStation Network
  - Cliff Diving
  - Ecolibrium
  - Escape Plan
  - Fireworks
  - Frobisher Says!
  - Hustle Kings
  - MotorStorm RC
  - Paint Park
  - Plants vs. Zombies (Published by Sony Online Entertainment in North America and PAL only)
  - PulzAR
  - Sound Shapes
  - Super Stardust Delta
  - t@g
  - Table Football
  - Table Ice Hockey
  - Table Top Tanks
  - Top Darts
  - Travel Bug
  - Treasure Park
  - Uncharted: Fight for Fortune
  - When Vikings Attack!

=== 2013 ===
- Retail
  - Disney Epic Mickey 2: The Power of Two (Retail version in PAL, download only in North America)
  - Invizimals: The Alliance (Retail version in PAL, download only in North America 1 year later)
  - Jak and Daxter Trilogy
  - Killzone: Mercenary
  - MLB 13: The Show (Retail version in North America, Korea and Australia, download only in PAL)
  - Sly Cooper: Thieves in Time
  - Soul Sacrifice
  - Tearaway
  - The Walking Dead: The Complete First Season
- PlayStation Network
  - Bentley's Hackpack
  - Doki-Doki Universe
  - Flow
  - Flower
  - Jacob Jones and the Bigfoot Mystery
  - Imaginstruments
  - Invizimals Hidden Challenges (PAL only)
  - Malicious Rebirth
  - Open Me!
  - Paint Park Plus
  - PlayStation Home Arcade
  - Ratchet & Clank: Full Frontal Assault
  - Table Mini Golf
  - Wake-up Club

=== 2014 ===
- Retail
  - Borderlands 2 (Distributed by Sony Computer Entertainment, Published by 2K)
  - Disney's The Muppets Movie Adventures (Retail version in PAL, download only in North America next year)
  - Freedom Wars
  - God of War Collection
  - Invizimals: The Resistance (Retail version in PAL, download only in North America next year)
  - LittleBigPlanet PS Vita: Marvel Super Hero Edition (Retail version in PAL, download only in North America)
  - Minecraft (Retail version in PAL, download code only in North America)
  - MLB 14: The Show (Retail version in North America, download only in PAL)
  - PlayStation Vita Pets (Retail version in PAL, download only in North America)
  - Ratchet & Clank Collection (Retail version in PAL, download only in North America)
  - The Sly Collection
  - The Walking Dead: Season Two
- PlayStation Network
  - CounterSpy
  - Dead Nation
  - Destiny of Spirits
  - Entwined
  - Hohokum
  - Lemmings Touch
  - Murasaki Baby
  - No Heroes Allowed: No Puzzles Either!
  - Resogun
  - Soul Sacrifice Delta (Retail version in Japan and Hong Kong only)
  - The Hungry Horde
  - The Unfinished Swan

=== 2015 ===
- Retail
  - Looney Tunes Galactic Sports! (PAL only)
  - MLB 15: The Show (Download code only in North America)
  - Moe Chronicle (Asia only)
  - Phineas and Ferb: Day of Doofenshmirtz (Retail version in PAL, download only in North America)
- PlayStation Network
  - BigFest
  - Disney's The Muppets Movie Adventures (Download only in North America, released in PAL the previous year)
  - Fat Princess: Piece of Cake
  - Helldivers
  - Oreshika: Tainted Bloodlines (Retail version in Japan and Hong Kong only)
  - Run Sackboy! Run!
  - MonsterBag

== toio ==
=== 2019 ===
- Retail
  - GoGo Robottopuroguramingu ~Rojībo No Himitsu~
  - Kōsaku Seibutsu Gezunroido
  - 〜Min'nade Motto Tanoshimeru〜 Toio Korekushon Kakuchō Pakku
  - Toio Doraibu
  - Toio Korekushon

=== 2020 ===
- Retail
  - Dai Maō No Bijutsukan to Kaitō-Dan
  - On Gaku de Asobou Pikotonzu

=== 2023 ===
- Retail
  - GoGo Robottopuroguramingu Adobansu

=== 2024 ===
- Retail
  - Toio Pureiguraundo Bēshikku
  - Toio Pureiguraundo Adobansu

== Windows ==
=== 1997 ===
- Jet Moto (North America only) (Published under Sony Interactive Studios America)
- Twisted Metal 2 (North America only) (Published under Sony Interactive Studios America)

=== 2015 ===
- Helldivers (Published under PlayStation Mobile)

=== 2016 ===
- Everybody's Gone to the Rapture (Published under PlayStation Mobile)

=== 2018 ===
- Guns Up! (Published under PlayStation Mobile)

=== 2019 ===
- ReadySet Heroes (Published under PlayStation Mobile)

=== 2020 ===
- Horizon Zero Dawn: Complete Edition (Published under PlayStation Mobile)
- Predator: Hunting Grounds (Published under PlayStation Mobile)

=== 2021 ===
- Days Gone (Published under PlayStation Mobile)

=== 2022 ===
- God of War (Published under PlayStation PC)
- Sackboy: A Big Adventure (Published under PlayStation PC)
- Spider-Man Remastered (Published under PlayStation PC)
- Spider-Man: Miles Morales (Published under PlayStation PC)
- Uncharted: Legacy of Thieves Collection (Published under PlayStation PC)

=== 2023 ===
- Ratchet & Clank: Rift Apart (Published under PlayStation PC)
- Returnal (Published under PlayStation PC)
- The Last of Us Part I (Published under PlayStation PC)

=== 2024 ===
- Concord (Published under PlayStation Publishing)
- Ghost of Tsushima Director's Cut (Published under PlayStation PC)
- God of War Ragnarök (Published under PlayStation Publishing)
- Helldivers 2 (Published under PlayStation PC)
- Horizon Forbidden West: Complete Edition (Published under PlayStation PC)
- Horizon Zero Dawn Remastered (Published under PlayStation Publishing)
- Lego Horizon Adventures (Published under PlayStation Publishing)
- Until Dawn (Published under PlayStation Publishing)

=== 2025 ===
- Midnight Murder Club (Published under PlayStation Publishing)
- Spider-Man 2 (Published under PlayStation Publishing)
- Stellar Blade (Published under PlayStation Publishing)
- The Last of Us Part II Remastered (Published under PlayStation Publishing)
- Lost Soul Aside (Published under PlayStation Publishing)

=== 2026 ===
- Death Stranding 2: On the Beach (Co-published under PlayStation Publishing)
- Marathon (Published by Bungie)
- Marvel Tōkon: Fighting Souls (Published under PlayStation Publishing)

=== Announced for 2027 ===
- Daba: Land of Water Scar (Published under PlayStation Publishing)
- Kena: Scars of Kosmora (Published under PlayStation Publishing)

=== To be announced ===
- 4:Loop (Published under PlayStation Publishing)
- Horizon Hunters Gathering (Published under PlayStation Publishing)

== iOS/Android ==
=== 2013 ===
- Knack's Quest (Published under PlayStation Mobile)
- Ratchet & Clank: Before the Nexus (Published under PlayStation Mobile)

=== 2014 ===
- Invizimals: Hidden Challenges (Published under PlayStation Mobile)
- Invizimals: New Alliance (Published under PlayStation Mobile)
- Invizimals: Revolution (Published under PlayStation Mobile)
- Minna no Golf Smart (Japan only)
- PS Vita Pets: Puppy Parlour (Published under PlayStation Mobile)
- Run Sackboy! Run! (Published under PlayStation Mobile)

=== 2015 ===
- Fat Princess: Piece of Cake (Published under PlayStation Mobile)

=== 2016 ===
- Invizimals: Battle Hunters (Published under PlayStation Mobile)
- Uncharted: Fortune Hunter (Published under PlayStation Mobile)

=== 2017 ===
- Mingol (Published by ForwardWorks) (Japan only)
- Sora to Umi no Aida (Published by ForwardWorks) (Japan only)

=== 2018 ===
- Arc the Lad R (Published by ForwardWorks) (Japan only)
- No Heroes Allowed! DASH! (Published by ForwardWorks) (Japan only)
- Wild Arms: Million Memories (Published by ForwardWorks) (Japan only)

=== 2019 ===
- Disgaea RPG (Published by ForwardWorks) (Japan only)
- Kendama no Gon Jiro Fit & Run (Published by ForwardWorks) (Japan only)
- Toro to Puzzle: Doko Demo Issyo (Published by ForwardWorks) (Japan only)

=== 2020 ===
- World Witches: United Front (Published by ForwardWorks) (Japan only)

=== 2021 ===
- Nyorokko (Published by ForwardWorks) (Japan only)

=== To be announced ===
- Ratchet & Clank: Ranger Rumble
- MLB The Show Mobile

== Licensed by Sony Interactive Entertainment ==
Year	Title	Platform(s)	Publisher	Ref.
2008	Ape Escape M	Java Platform, Micro Edition	Living Mobile	
2015	Return to PopoloCrois	Nintendo 3DS	Marvelous	
2017	Lemmings: The Puzzle Adventure	iOS, Android	Exient	
2017	Flower	iOS, Microsoft Windows	Annapurna Interactive	
2019	Journey	iOS, Microsoft Windows	Annapurna Interactive	
2019	Heavy Rain	Microsoft Windows	Quantic Dream	
2019	Beyond: Two Souls	Microsoft Windows	Quantic Dream	
2019	Detroit: Become Human	Microsoft Windows	Quantic Dream	
2019	No Heroes Allowed: No Puzzles Either!	iOS, Android, Microsoft Windows	SEAStoriesStudio	
2020	The Unfinished Swan	iOS, Microsoft Windows	Annapurna Interactive	
2021	Ultimate Sackboy	iOS, Android	Exient	
2021	Wipeout Merge	iOS, Android	Rouge Games	
2021	Erica	iOS, Microsoft Windows	Flavourworks	
2022	Hohokum	Microsoft Windows	Annapurna Interactive	
2022	Iron Man VR	Quest 2, Meta Quest Pro, Meta Quest 3	Oculus Studios	
2023	Fantavision 202X	Microsoft Windows, PlayStation 5	Cosmo Machia	
2025	Freedom Wars Remastered	Microsoft Windows, Nintendo Switch, PlayStation 4, PlayStation 5	Bandai Namco	
2025	Patapon 1+2 Replay	Microsoft Windows, Nintendo Switch, PlayStation 5	Bandai Namco	
2025	Destiny Rising	iOS, Android	NetEase	Licensed by Bungie
2025	Everybody's Golf: Hot Shots	Microsoft Windows, Nintendo Switch, PlayStation 5	Bandai Namco	
TBA	Horizon Steel Frontiers	iOS, Android, Microsoft Windows (Android Emulator in NC Soft's Purple Launcher)	NC Soft	

== Developed but not published by Sony Interactive Entertainment ==
Year	Title	Platform(s)	Publisher	Ref.
1997	Frogger	PlayStation, Microsoft Windows	Hasbro Interactive	
1997	Beast Wars: Transformers	PlayStation, Microsoft Windows	Hasbro Interactive	
1998	Wipeout 64	Nintendo 64	Midway Games	
2000	Lemmings: Revolution	Microsoft Windows	Take-Two Interactive	
2002	Arc The Lad: Kishin Fukkatsu	WonderSwan Color	Bandai	
2007	God of War: Betrayal	Java Platform, Micro Edition	Sony Pictures Digital	
2018	Just Deal With It!	PlayStation 4	Super Punk Games	
2021	MLB The Show 21	Xbox One, Xbox Series X|S	MLB Advanced Media	
2022	MLB The Show 22	Xbox One, Xbox Series X|S, Nintendo Switch	MLB Advanced Media	
2023	MLB The Show 23	Xbox One, Xbox Series X|S, Nintendo Switch	MLB Advanced Media	
2024	MLB The Show 24	Xbox One, Xbox Series X|S, Nintendo Switch	MLB Advanced Media	
2025	MLB The Show 25	Xbox Series X|S, Nintendo Switch	MLB Advanced Media	
2026	MLB The Show 26	Xbox Series X|S, Nintendo Switch	MLB Advanced Media	

== See also ==
- Sony Interactive Entertainment
- PlayStation Studios
- List of Xbox Game Studios video games
- List of products published by Nintendo
