= Wild Arms 5 =

2006 video game

- North American cover art
- Developer: Media.Vision (Note: Additional work by Japan Studio.)
- Publishers: JP: Sony Computer Entertainment; NA/AU: Xseed Games; EU: 505 Games
- Director: Nobukazu Satō
- Producers: Akifumi Kaneko; Eitaro Nagano; Kentaro Motomura
- Designer: Koichi Shirasaka
- Artists: Takayuki Yabubayashi; Tomomi Sasaki
- Writers: Kaoru Kurosaki; Hirokazu Taki
- Composers: Masato Kouda; Noriyasu Agematsu
- Series: Wild Arms
- Platform: PlayStation 2
- Release: JP: December 14, 2006; NA: August 28, 2007; EU: February 22, 2008; AU: April 17, 2008
- Genre: Turn-based role-playing
- Mode: Single-player

Wild Arms 5, released in Japan as Wild Arms: The Fifth Vanguard (Note: Japanese: ワイルドアームズ ザ フィフスヴァンガード, Hepburn: Wairudo Āmuzu Za Fifusu Vangādo), is a turn-based role-playing video game developed by Media.Vision and published by Sony Computer Entertainment for the PlayStation 2. It is the fifth main instalment of the Wild Arms series. It was released in December 2006 in Japan, August 2007 in North America by Xseed Games, February 2008 in Europe by 505 Games and April 2008 in Australia by Xseed Games. The game puts some emphasis on environmental interaction and advances the HEX battle system. Wild Arms 5 received positive reviews and is one of the more well-regarded games in the series.

== Gameplay ==
=== Combat system ===
Wild Arms 5 continues the HEX battle system, where the enemy encounter field is split into seven hexagonal sections, some of which may have special properties. The player and enemies can move to different hexagons during their turn. This time around, the party count is three instead of four. Dean's party members and enemies can act instantly when they move onto the next hexagonal platform.

The Force meter returns from Wild Arms 4. This meter increases as Dean's party members make physical attacks or are attacked. This can be used for Original attacks, Team Combos or summoning Guardian beasts to attack enemies. The more powerful the attack is, the more the Force meter will be drained. The characters can summon guardian beasts to the field to attack enemies. They can also use combination attacks that utilize most or all of the party. A new feature in Wild Arms 5 is the ability to chain attacks together. This lets one of Dean's party members attack two to five times provided they have the Violator Badge equipped and enough bullets to make the attack.

=== Wild ARMs ===
Each playable character is equipped with an ARM, a specialized kind of gun that deals physical damage in a range that varies for each character, from one-hex away to any hex. The ARMs must be reloaded after a number of shots by having the character defend for one round. While each character has a specific ARM, there are cartridges that can be added to increase its firepower. The ARMs also have their own stats that can be boosted by using "dragon fossil" items acquired during play. Like in other Wild Arms games, ARM is an acronym, though its actual meaning is obscure. There are two versions given in the game.

By the time the player is able to control three characters at once early in the game, the tools known as mediums are introduced. In this version, they are portable computer devices with mystical qualities. Each character can only equip one medium at a time and there are six available mediums throughout the game. Each medium specializes in affecting specific parameters and granting the character unique Original and Force abilities.

=== Exploration ===
Wild Arms 5 is a third-person video game. The world map is not scaled down, and towns and dungeons can be seen in their real size. The player traverses the world by walking, or employing various vehicles, including a train and monowheel.

Dungeon exploration has two modes. In Action mode, the player can jump, slide, and interact with objects. In Shooting mode, Dean draws both of his ARMs and can fire them freely. By employing various cartridges, the player can interact with the environment in a number of ways. Some examples include activating distant switches, breaking down obstacles, and lighting torches.

== Plot ==
=== Story ===
Like every game in the Wild Arms series, Wild Arms 5 takes place on the world of Filgaia. Humans are currently being ruled over by the Veruni, an alien race that landed on Filgaia 100 years ago. Dean Stark, the protagonist of the story, lives in a secluded village away from all the turmoil. He dreams of one day leaving the village to pursue his dream of becoming a Golem Hunter, someone who excavates ancient robots, like his idol Nightburn. While in the mountains, Dean and his childhood friend Rebecca spot a Golem's arm fall from the sky and land in a cave just in front of them. Upon entering the cave, they find a girl curled up within the Golem's hand. The girl only remembers two things, her name (Avril), and the words Johnny Appleseed. After receiving the pair of ARMs (special guns) she was holding, Dean, along with Avril and Rebecca, decides to embark on an adventure to find out what the words "Johnny Appleseed" really mean.

Meanwhile, a revolt has begun within the Veruni government. A man named Volsung has overthrown the leader of the Radical faction, sworn enemies of the more peaceful Moderater faction, claiming that his violent actions are necessary for the survival of the Veruni.

=== Characters ===
==== Playable characters ====
All playable characters are equipped with ARM weapons:

- Dean Stark - a teenage boy who wishes to be a Golem Hunter. Dean often obsesses over Golems, to the point where he, if he can, finds any piece of any Golem. He is naive, but his idealism influences the other characters. He idolizes Nightburn. Dean fights with a pair of ARMs. Special Ability: Double Critical: Doubles the damage of all critical attacks.
- Rebecca Streisand - Dean's childhood friend, who is smarter than he is. She has feelings for him, but does not dare reveal them. Rebecca fights with a revolver-style ARM. Special Ability: Continuous Shot: Can randomly shoot/attack two to five times.
- Avril Vent Fleur - a mysterious girl with amnesia. Avril fights with a sword ARM that can change into a whip. Special Ability: Double DP: Can randomly double the DP of all physical attacks including critical attacks.
- Greg Russellberg - a 'Golem Crusher' who destroys golems, looking to find the man who killed his family. Greg fights with a combination sword/shotgun. Special Ability: Shoot and Guard' Randomly guards after attacking.
- Chuck Preston - a young, boastful Golem Hunter with self-confidence issues. He fights with a piledriver-like weapon. Special Ability: Increases his attack power proportional to his loss of HP.
- Carol Anderson - the young assistant of a mysterious professor. She is extremely intelligent, but very shy and clumsy. She is equipped with a backpack-mounted missile launcher. Special Ability: Can attack any enemy from any position.
- Asgard - the golem that dropped Avril. It acts as a transportation device and an ally in battle. Asgard is not under direct player control, but its combat actions can be preprogrammed.

==== Other characters ====
- The group's enemies include Volsung, leader of the radical movement, and the four sentinels under his command, Fereydoon, Persephone, Kartikeya, and Elvis. Their goal is to ensure the survival of the Veruni race at any cost. Note that all these characters (except Elvis) are named for figures from various mythologies, although this is not mentioned in the game. Volsung comes from Norse myth, Fereydoon from Persian myth, Persephone from Greek myth and Kartikeya from Hindu beliefs.
- Other characters include Nightburn Acklund, a famous golem hunter who is Dean's hero, and Captain Bartholomew, the captain of the Moderate ship Mayflower.
- Cameos from other games include all the playable characters (excluding Lucied from 2nd Ignition) from Wild Arms and its remake, Wild Arms Alter Code: F, Wild Arms 2, Wild Arms 3, and Wild Arms 4. Some may or may not be the characters they resemble, but most are likely just cameos. These characters are not playable, though many of them are part of the game's sidequests. The anime series, Wild Arms: Twilight Venom, is also given a nod in the form of a boss by the name of "Twilight Venom".

== Development ==
The game makes use of CGI to create a 3D effect, including a slow camera pan drift. The player can zoom in and out from different angles during gameplay. There are also several computer generated cut scenes. The art style for the characters is a typical anime look, as opposed to a realistic or super deformed one. In addition, the game features a wide selection of alternate costumes for all the playable characters, including several originally used by characters from the previous Wild Arms games, that can be obtained during gameplay.

The game features voiceovers in several of its cutscenes and battles. The music for Wild Arms 5, the only video game title where the original series composer Michiko Naruke did not contribute, was provided by Masato Kouda along with series newcomer Noriyasu Agematsu. Unlike past Wild Arms, Nana Mizuki sung the opening "Justice to Believe" and ending "Crystal Letter" theme rather than Kaori Asoh.

== Release ==
Sony announced the game through a special website commemorating the series' upcoming 10th anniversary website.

In the United States, the first print run of Wild Arms 5 came in a commemorative "Series 10th Anniversary" box and included an art book featuring character art from all five Wild Arms games. This limited edition was later replaced by a standard edition with different cover art and no extras. The European version was released in two different versions: a limited edition, including an 80-page art book, and a standard edition, without the art book. Both featured the "Series 10th Anniversary" cover from the US release.

The game was released for the PlayStation Network in Japan on October 14, 2014.

== Reception ==
Reception

Aggregate score
Aggregator	Score
Metacritic	71/100

Review scores
Publication	Score
Electronic Gaming Monthly	6.5/10 (Note: Three critics of Electronic Gaming Monthly gave the game each a score of 8/10, 6.5/10, and 5/10.)
Famitsu	34/40
Game Informer	6.5/10
GameSpot	7.5/10
GameSpy	3/5
GameTrailers	8.2/10
GameZone	7.9/10
Hardcore Gamer	3/5
IGN	7.3/10
PlayStation: The Official Magazine	5.5/10
RPGamer	3.5/5
RPGFan	85%

Wild Arms 5 received a Metacritic score of 71/100. It is one of the more well-regarded games in the series. In Japan, Famitsu gave it a score of one eight, one nine, one eight, and one nine for a total of 34 out of 40. GamePro said of the game, "The sometimes ridiculous characters, anime presence, and engaging story line work together with intensely fun and strategic play mechanics to make this installment of the ARMs series the best yet. For the $40 price tag that includes an eighty page artbook, it's more than worth it for any RPG fan to pick up." (Note: GamePro gave the game three 4/5 scores for graphics, control, and fun factor, and 4.25/5 for sound.)
