= Wild Arms XF =

2007 video game

- PAL region cover art
- Developer: Media.Vision
- Publishers: JP: Sony Computer Entertainment; NA: Xseed Games; EU: 505 Games
- Director: Nobukazu Sato
- Producers: Akifumi Kaneko; Eitaro Nagano; Kentaro Motomura
- Designer: Nobuo Nakazawa
- Programmer: Masanori Yamamoto
- Writer: Akifumi Kaneko
- Composers: Masato Kouda; Noriyasu Agematsu; Junpei Fujita; Hitoshi Fujima; Daisuke Kikuta
- Series: Wild Arms
- Platform: PlayStation Portable
- Release: JP: August 9, 2007; NA: March 11, 2008; EU: November 28, 2008
- Genre: Tactical role-playing
- Mode: Single-player

Wild Arms XF (Note: Japanese: ワイルドアームズ クロスファイア, Hepburn: Wairudo Āmuzu Kurosufaia; Wild Arms Crossfire) is a game in the Wild Arms series, the first for the PlayStation Portable. The game was unveiled at a Media.Vision fan event on September 2, 2006, and was released in Japan in 2007, and in North America and Europe in 2008.

== Gameplay ==
Wild Arms XF is a 2D turn-based tactical role-playing game, creating a gameplay experience somewhere between Dungeons & Dragons and chess. Players are given control of a small squad of characters (six or less) and placed on a grid-based map resembling a geographical location (a swamp, a town, a river), upon which they fight battles to progress through the game. As with most T/RPGs, positional advantage can be critical to victory, and players are encouraged to outmaneuver their enemies as well as outgun them. The game emphasizes positioning and maneuvering by the inclusion of "Formation Arts," which increase attack damage when an enemy is surrounded by your characters in a line, a triangle or a circle. Wild Arms XF is a member of the small subsection of T/RPGs whose battlefields are based around hexagonal tiles instead of squares. "Combination Arts" return from previous Wild ARMs titles, allowing characters to target an enemy in a waiting state and then deliver their attacks simultaneously with the next ally to attack their target. If the player succeeds in executing an uninterrupted series of commands, the damage inflicted upon enemies will increase significantly. On the other hand, the enemy gets the same advantage.

Like most T/RPGs, XF gives the player precision control over the composition and fighting style of their army. The player is given control of several plot-critical characters, and can additionally hire generic "Drifters" to strengthen their ranks. All characters (except one, Tony) have access to the game's "Class system", which allows them to change into different character classes outside of combat; each class comes with various "Skills", which allow them to perform different combat roles (offensive spellcasting, healing, item use, damage-dealing, etc.). Skills consist of a set of "Original Commands", active abilities which require MP to use, followed by a series of passive bonuses which help add character to the class. Drifters have access only to the basic 16 classes, but unique/plot-critical characters also have personal classes. The true depth of the system, however, is that it allows players to mix-and-match Skills. Each battle won provides experience points and also "Class Skill Points", which allow characters to permanently learn Skills from their current class. The player can then fill each character's Skill Slots with those permanently learned Skills, no matter what Class that character currently is, allowing (for instance) the item-wielding Gadgeteer to wield an Elementalist's magic spells and/or passive bonuses, or vice versa. The number of available Skill Slots increases with the character's level, allowing a wide variety of customization.

Before battle begins, the player can gather important pieces of information by looking at Labyrinthia's "Direct Event Report". This report informs the player about the current status, the forecast future status, and conditions for victory. Players are allowed to "Give Up" the battle and try again from scratch at any time, and indeed are expected to do so; battles in XF are in some ways more akin to puzzles than straightforward combat. This is underlined by the addition of a third meter in addition to hit points and magic points: "Vitality Points", which are reduced every turn by a number equal to the "Weight" of the character's equipment and items. Once their VP are expended in this way, the Weight penalty is subtracted from the character's HP instead until only 1 remains. This imposes a time limit on battles, as protracted skirmishes will eventually be reduced to "sudden death" in this way. Furthermore, some battles have turn limits, which yield Game-Overs if the player fails accomplish all objectives within that time; and a few are stealth-based sneaking missions involving pure maneuvering.

Outside of battle, the player can travel around the "world map" of the nation of Elesius, visiting towns and conversing with townsfolk, employing or dismissing Drifters, and purchasing consumable items and weaponry. Existing equipment can be strengthened at "Synthesis" shops, a system which almost entirely replaces the RPG-standard method of the next town conveniently carrying the next-strongest phase of gear. The player can voluntarily fight skirmishes with local monsters for level-grinding purposes. Finally, a New Game Plus feature exists, allowing the player to keep all (non-plot-critical) money, items and equipment; character levels are not retained, but battles yield double their normal number of Experience points.

== Plot ==
The game's story centers around a group of knights called Chevalet Blanc and how the protagonist and her knights take back the kingdom of Elesius, which is being controlled by the Council of Elder Statesmen. The Princess Royal of the kingdom died in an accident, and the king is too ill to rule, which brought about the rise of the council. Like other Wild Arms titles, this takes place on the dying planet Filgaia, this time where the remaining natural resources, food, land and financial assets are at the center of continued armed confrontations. Despite this, Elesius is one of the few peaceful places on Filgaia.

Chevalet Blanc's beginnings are anything but noble: two Drifters, Clarissa Arwin and her adoptive brother Felius come to the kingdom of Elesius in pursuit of a Drifter named Rupert Dandridge, who five years ago slew Clarissa's mother, itinerant archaeologist Melissa Arwin, and took from her the powerful sword "Iskender Bey". Clarissa's mission is solely to retrieve that sword, but before much time has passed, she has been confused for Alexia Lynn Elesius, the heir-presumptive to the throne of Elesius who died a year ago under mysterious circumstances. While the council's rule is generally self-centered, their most constant presence in Elesius takes the form of the "Martial Guard", a mercenary "peacekeeping" force who steal and oppress with impunity. To rally the citizens of Elesius, Clarissa publicly declares herself to be Alexia, and founds a rebel movement called "Chevalet Blanc", after the Founding Knights of Elesius. Its established goal is to defend the citizens of the nation, which will involve defeating the council. The fact that Rupert is the leader of the Martial Guard only strengthens Clarissa's resolve.

== Characters ==
=== Playable characters ===
- Clarissa Arwin: The leader of Chevalet Blanc, she wields a firearm-like weapon named Strahl Gewehr. She is swept up in a political war when she and Felius travel to the Kingdom of Elesius to retrieve her mother's sword from Rupert. For the first half of the game, she is mistaken for Princess Alexia, due to their striking resemblance; after hearing of Elesius' plight from Labyrinthia, she agrees to perpetuate the deception in order to give people hope. Her personal class is "Dandelion Shot", which allows her to wield the Strahl Gewehr and gives her access to various protective and enhancing skills that reflect her determination.
- Felius Arwin: A silent, blue-haired man clad in black, he is Clarissa's foster brother (having been adopted by her mother) and has vowed to protect Clarissa and never leave her side. Although his blunt and distant attitude may lead others to think he is cold, he is in fact a very kind and gentle person who cares deeply for his newfound companions. It is eventually revealed that he is a visitor from another dimension, Elw Borea, where he was instrumental in overthrowing an evil tyrant; his comrade-in-arms, Kressen, then declared himself heir to said tyrant, and (through a series of mishaps) got them both stranded on Filgaia. His personal class is "Halberdier", which allows him to wield a polearm.
- Labyrinthia Wordsworth: Formerly the royal court magician and Princess Alexia's personal tutor, she is the first to mistake Clarissa for the missing princess. Labyrinthia is very intelligent and serves as the tactician of Chevalet Blanc. Although she was a commoner, because of King Hrathnir's reforms, she was able to acquire an education and ascend using her talent and intelligence; she had been branded a terrorist when Clarissa and Felius met her. Her personal class is "Arcanist", which gives her a wide variety of useful moves, such as the ability to teleport, the ability to create a decoy of herself, and the ability to revive fallen comrades.
- Levin Brenton: A young boy of House Brenton, the nobility in charge of the protection of the kingdom, Levin is idealistic and occasionally naive. He is overjoyed when he hears 'Princess Alexia' is alive and breaks free from his father to support her. He uses tonfas as weapons. His personal class is "Martial Mage", whose abilities revolve around both physical and magical offense.
- Ragnar Blitz Lebrett: A mercenary with a formal way of speaking despite his rough appearance. He holds a deep hatred for Elesius as the country had destroyed his life and everything important thrice. He is the one who cooks, cleans, and sews in the group. A revenge-bent drifter who starts out working with Clarissa only to destroy what Elesius has become. His personal class is "Stormrider" and is optimized for rushing in, getting the enemy's attention, and then damaging them indiscriminately.
- Alexia Lynn Elesius: The Princess Royal of the Kingdom of Elesius, rumored to be dead after a landslide. She shared her father's ideals for a royalty which would unite with the people to triumph over hardships rather than conquer other lands; however, she has no affinity with the "Guardian Spirits" of Elesius and, as such, had to be removed from the line of succession. Her physical similarities to Clarissa are a pure coincidence, but led to an incident in their childhood: when both girls were young, they were trapped under rubble from a building destroyed during an attack on King Hrathnir. Both were rescued, but accidentally switched up in the process: Princess Alexia is Clarissa Arwin, and vice versa. Despite this, both continue using their adopted names and identities once this information comes to light. Her personal class is "Royal Fencer", which (like Dandelion Shot) is useful in empowering the warriors around her.
- Tony: A white dog. He is the only character that is unable to change classes; his class ("Crossbreed") has no Originals, but gives him enormous mobility and strong resistance to elemental attacks, though he quickly loses his advantages as the game continues. Though he begins the game as Labyrinthia's pet, he becomes loyal to Clarissa over the course of the game. During the game's final cutscenes, it is strongly implied he may be the Guardian of Desire, Lucied, who has appeared in previous Wild Arms titles.

=== Non-playable characters ===
- Rupert Dandridge: A ruthless drifter who stole Clarissa's mother's sword. He's traveled the world, and now works for the Council in Elesius. Rupert has no qualms about abandoning his soldiers or even killing them himself if it means that he can survive.
- Charlton Blunt: A Council member in Elesius who rose to his current status from a ruined noble family. He seeks to revive the old ways of the kingdom and holds a firm belief that nobles must act above the lowly tendencies of the commoners, a belief that often sparks his aggravation of Edna.
- Edna: A Council member and upholder of Elesius's abbeys, she works to train Katrina to perform the Divine Rite of Coalescence. She is an overweight woman proven to be greedy, selfish, and quite cowardly. She is often ridiculed for leaving problems to be fixed by others and stooping to unfathomable depths to get her way and survive.
- Weisheit: Known as the Death Merchant, he is a mysterious entity who has dealt with the royal family of Elesius for several centuries. He is the one who provides the deadly weapons for the council.
- Eisen Brenton: Levin's father and the captain of the Knights of Elesius. He believes very strongly in his duty as a Knight and does not waver in his decision to not act despite being fully aware of the political turmoil arising in the country. Although he is a stubborn man, he is actually a good-natured person.
- Hrathnir Elesius: Current king of Elesius and, before age and infirmity, a skilled swordsman and warrior. Inheriting a kingdom notorious for unprovoked wars of conquest, he undertook reforms to reshape Elesius into a nation that could survive without constant bloodshed. These reforms were unpopular, leading to a number of revolts and assassination attempts.
- Katrina: Princess of Elesius and Alexia's younger sister, the Council seeks to use her in their schemes to take the kingdom. She is extremely gifted as a princess medium, but soft-spoken, making her an easy person to manipulate. As well, she is cursed with a unique disability, the complete incapability of feeling or understanding the emotion of 'fear'.
- Melissa Arwin: Clarissa's mother, an archaeologist who traveled the world in search of ancient technology called "The Legacy Ruins". She was the former wielder of the magical sword "Iskender Bey" until Rupert slew her and took it for himself.

== Music ==
Composers Koda Masato, who previously composed for Wild Arms 4 and 5, and Elements Garden's Noriyasu Agematsu, who composed for Wild Arms 5, returned to score the soundtrack for Wild Arms XF, along with Junpei Fujita, Hitoshi Fujima and Daisuke Kikuta, all from Elements Garden. The intro theme song "Lies of Truth" (Honki no Uso) and the ending theme song "For Whom" (Taga Tame ni) were both written by Michiko Naruke, composed by Noriyasu Agematsu and performed by Kaori Oda. The former was arranged by Agematsu, while the latter was arranged by Junpei Fujita. The four-disc Wild Arms XF Original Soundtrack was released on August 29, 2007.

== Reception ==
Reception

Aggregate score
| Aggregator | Score |
|---|---|
| Metacritic | 64/100 |

Review scores
| Publication | Score |
|---|---|
| 1Up.com | C− |
| Destructoid | 6/10 |
| Famitsu | 31/40 |
| Game Informer | 7.5/10 |
| GamePro | 3/5 |
| GameSpot | 5.5/10 |
| GameSpy | 3.5/5 |
| GameZone | 6/10 |
| IGN | 5.8/10 |
| PlayStation: The Official Magazine | 3.5/5 |
| RPGamer | 3/5 |
| RPGFan | 87% |

Wild Arms XF received mixed reviews according to the review aggregation website Metacritic. In Japan, Famitsu gave it a score of 31 out of 40.
