= The Wizard of Oz: Beyond the Yellow Brick Road =

2008 video game

- North American box art
- Developer: Media.Vision
- Publishers: JP: D3 Publisher; NA: Xseed Games
- Director: Nobuo Nakazawa
- Producer: Tetsuya Okubo
- Composers: Hitoshi Sakimoto; Michiko Naruke; Masaharu Iwata
- Platform: Nintendo DS
- Release: JP: December 25, 2008; NA: September 30, 2009
- Genre: Role-playing
- Mode: Single-player

The Wizard of Oz: Beyond the Yellow Brick Road, known in Japan as Riz-Zoawd, is a role-playing video game developed by Media.Vision and published by D3 Publisher for the Nintendo DS. The game is an adaptation of L. Frank Baum's 1900 novel The Wonderful Wizard of Oz, using its characters, locations and plot. The game was originally released in Japan on December 25, 2008. Xseed Games published the game in North America on September 29, 2009.

== Gameplay ==
Gameplay is restricted entirely to the Touchscreen. Moving Dorothy requires the player to use the stylus to move the green trackball on the bottom screen. Battles take place in a first-person view similar to such games as Dragon Quest and Earthbound. Along the way, Dorothy and company gain abilities by meeting the elemental spirits and by defeating the dragon masters. Each time the group defeats a dragon master, they will gain spells and skills, such as the ability to heal or to lower an enemy's defense parameter. Since the party never naturally learns any spells or abilities via leveling up, it is imperative to seek out the dragon masters and challenge them. The elemental spirits function as exploration items during dungeon excursions, similar to the Tools system from the Wild Arms series, and are generally used to open doors that lead to rare treasures and additional areas that were previously inaccessible.

Each party member specializes in combat against a specific type of enemy and thus their physical attacks do more damage to that species. For example, Dorothy excels at dealing with ghost-types while Lion best handles beast-types. Combat is set up in a unique system where each of the four companions can attack based on an allotment of slots per turn. Every turn, the party always has four slots to utilize and each party member uses a specific number of slots when selected to perform any action; Dorothy and Scarecrow each use one slot, Lion uses two, and Tin Man uses three. This means that Tin Man can only ever perform one action per turn and that Lion can never attack in the same round with him. Characters who don't participate in a round of combat are safe from damage, allowing for some strategy as to who should act and who should stay on the sidelines.

== Plot ==
The game follows Dorothy and her group of friends as they complete a task for the Wizard of Oz. He asks them to defeat four different witches. After this, he promises to grant each of the companions' wishes.

Each of the witches has magical eggs that the player is supposed to collect. There are ten in all: three each in the spring, summer, and fall levels, and one in the winter level. After the player gets these, Oz turns against them and they have to travel the yellow brick road to defeat him. Once in the castle there is only one way out, which is to defeat Oz.

=== Characters ===
The game's depiction of the Cowardly Lion, Dorothy, Toto, Tin Man and Scarecrow

- Dorothy Gale: The protagonist, who, with her dog Toto, ended up in the land of OZ after being sucked into a tornado. They must complete Oz's task in order to grant her wish of returning home.
- Scarecrow: A friendly scarecrow Dorothy meets who, while an optimist, lacks a brain.
- Tin Man: A metal woodsman Dorothy encounters in the woods who lacks a heart. Unlike other iterations of the character, Tin Man is incapable of speaking intelligibly and simply makes loud metallic grunts to communicate with others.
- Cowardly Lion: A lion who lacks courage, who Dorothy meets after the Scarecrow.
- Protea, The Witch of the Winter: Her domain is south of Oz Castle. She is the mother of the three witch Sisters. (She is this game's interpretation of Glinda the Good.)
- Delphi, the Summer Witch: A carefree witch whose only wish is to live a fun and enjoyable life. She is a free spirit but can be a bit unpredictable.
- Holly, the Autumn Witch: Although she is the oldest, she takes childish pleasure in scaring people.
- Flora, the Spring Witch: A gentle-hearted witch who loves flowers. She is around Dorthy's age and not so secretly hopes to be friends with her.
- Cat Hoods: Catlike beings that serve the Three Witch Sisters.
- Oz: The ruler of OZ Castle. (The game's interpretation of the "Great and Powerful" Oz.) His primary role in the game is to fully heal the party as well as sell them items and equipment.

== Development ==
The Wizard of Oz: Beyond the Yellow Brick Road was developed by the Japanese video game studio Media.Vision, the company behind the Wild Arms series. The game was produced by Wild Arms designer Tetsuya Okubo and directed by Nobuo Nakazawa, who joined the company starting with Wild Arms 2. The game's Japanese title, RIZ-ZOAWD, is an anagram of "Wizard" and "Oz". According to Nakazawa, the name come about through Japan's "tendency to like meaningless enumerations of letters and coined words" and that they chose the title because "it had a ring to it, the feeling of the word, and it sounded good to our ears".

The Wizard of Oz: Beyond the Yellow Brick Road was first unveiled in the Japanese magazine Famitsu in June 2008, and was later shown in more detail at the Tokyo Game Show months later. The game includes a limited edition music CD for its initial release in Japan, featuring six tracks including the game's title theme, composed and performed by Michiko Naruke and Kaori Asoh respectively. Xseed Games announced in July 2009 that they had acquired the North American publishing rights to the game with licensing by Warner Bros.

== Reception ==
Reception

Aggregate score
Aggregator	Score
Metacritic	68/100

Review scores
Publication	Score
1Up.com	C+
Famitsu	28/40
GamePro	2.5/5
GameRevolution	C
GameSpot	5.5/10
GamesRadar+	3.5/5
IGN	8/10
Nintendo Power	6.5/10
Nintendo World Report	8/10
RPGamer	3.5/5
RPGFan	85%

The game received "average" reviews according to the review aggregation website Metacritic. IGN reviewer Mark Bozon said, "It's great for younger (or casual) players, and it's also a haven for awesome RPGs – seldom is it both at once though...The Wizard of Oz is all about compromise, since the game is literally out to satisfy two very different crowds, it's simple enough for newcomers while still being deep enough for open-minded hardcore players too." He also went on to praise the use of the trackball running/walking tool (calling it "catchy") and the sole use of the Nintendo DS's touch screen function. In Japan, Famitsu gave it a score of one seven, one eight, one seven, and one six for a total of 28 out of 40.
