= Music of Wild Arms =

Music from the video game Wild Arms

Albums for the video game Wild Arms contain music from the original title of the Wild Arms series developed by Japanese software company Media.Vision. Two separate albums, one released alongside the 1996 PlayStation game, and the other ten years later, contain the original background music from the game, while a single drama album contains a spoken-word interpretation of events in the game. All music featured on each album was composed by Michiko Naruke and carries a contemporary American Western feel intermixed with electronic instrumentation. As each album was only released commercially in Japan, track names contain original Japanese character names and spelling.

== Wild Arms Original Game Soundtrack ==
Wild Arms Original Game Soundtrack

Soundtrack album by Michiko Naruke
- Released: ^{JPN} January 22, 1997^{JPN} October 1, 1999 (re-print)
- Recorded: Hitokuchizaka Studio (Keio University)
- Genre: Video game music
- Length: 68:17
- Label: Antinos Records; SPE Visual Works (re-print)
- Producer: Michiko Naruke, Kazuhiko Toyama

Michiko Naruke chronology
@MIDI's Drive (1996)	Wild Arms Original Game Soundtrack (1997)	@MIDI's Love (1997)

Professional ratings
Review scores
Source	Rating
Soundtrack Central	link

The Wild Arms Original Game Soundtrack is a music soundtrack for the video game Wild Arms, and was released one month after the PlayStation title on January 22, 1997. The album was marketed and sold exclusively in Japan, and was issued a re-print two years later in October 1999. While the original release was published under the now-defunct Antinos Records label, the re-issue was sold under Sony Pictures Entertainment Visual Works, later known as Aniplex.

=== Album information ===
All tracks were composed by Michiko Naruke, who would be responsible for the majority of the Wild Arms series' soundtracks in the coming years. The music of Wild Arms is highly reminiscent of classic American Westerns and related films, which coincides with the game's setting in a fantasy world made to resemble the American Old West. While the tracks contains a number of synthesized instruments, recurring sounds include mandolins, acoustic and electric guitars, woodwind instruments, trumpets, and whistling alongside a score composed in a classical style. Arrangement for each track was handled by Kazuhiko Toyama.

The soundtrack contains a total of 36 tracks, representing less than half of all the total background music in the game. All tracks are contained on a single disc, with the order and arrangement of the pieces being different than their presentation in actual game-play. Among the songs present are the original Japanese ending theme "Swearing to the Blue Sky" performed by Machiko Watanabe that was not used for the North American or PAL region releases of Wild Arms, and "Clash and a Promise", which features a choral accompaniment by students of Tokyo's Keio University sung in Latin.

== Wild Arms Complete Tracks ==
Wild Arms Complete Tracks

Soundtrack album by Michiko Naruke
- Released: ^{JPN} April 5, 2006
- Genre: Video game music
- Length: 119:15
- Label: King Records
- Producer: Michiko Naruke, Kazuhiko Toyama, Takeo Miratsu

Michiko Naruke chronology
Wild Arms: The 4th Detonator Original Score (2005)	Wild Arms Complete Tracks (2006)	Wild Arms Music the Best -feeling wind- (2006)

Wild Arms Complete Tracks is a VGM soundtrack for Wild Arms featuring music from the PlayStation title in its original format released in Japan in April 2006. Unlike the previously released Wild Arms Original Game Soundtrack, which only contained a limited number of pieces from the game, Complete Tracks features 79 pieces of background music across two discs, including all selections from the original album. The album was distributed by King Records, a subsidiary of literary and manga company Kodansha Limited.

=== Album Information ===
All tracks were composed by Michiko Naruke, and lend themselves to the American West thematic present throughout the game. Like the Wild Arms Original Game Soundtrack, it contains a number of tracks representing a wide variety of synth instruments, with accompanying vocals on select tracks. Though the album houses all the music from its predecessor, it contains an additional 43 tracks of previously unreleased tracks.

An additional production credit was given to Takeo Miratsu, who served as an arranger for certain tracks, while Michiko Naruke and Kazuhiko Toyama retained their roles as arrangers and primary album supervisors. The track "Holy Mother of Darkness" contains addition choral music from Keio University's chorus, originally recorded in 1996 and released with the Wild Arms video game in Japan.

== Wild Arms Drama vol. 1 ==
Wild Arms Drama vol. 1

Soundtrack album by Michiko Naruke
- Released: ^{JPN} 1998^{JPN} June 29, 2002 (re-issue)
- Genre: Drama / Video game music
- Length: 48:18
- Label: Movic Co., Ltd
- Producer: Michiko Naruke

Michiko Naruke chronology
@MIDI's Dance (1998)	Wild Arms Drama vol. 1 (1998)	@MIDI's Battle (1999)

Wild Arms Drama vol. 1 (later released as simply Wild Arms Drama CD) is a spoken-word drama album containing voice actors performing scenes from the video game Wild Arms. The acting is accompanied by background music from the game's soundtrack composed by Michiko Naruke, who also served as the album's producer. Originally released one year after the Original Game Soundtrack in 1998, Wild Arms Drama was later re-issued in June 2002, both times under the Movic record label.

=== Album information ===
Wild Arms Drama serves as an interpretation of various scenes from the original game, which itself featured only written dialogue. As the album was only intended only for Japanese audiences, it is performed entirely in the Japanese language, with sound effects and background music added to increase realism. The album is divided into seven disproportionately sized chapters that take place at certain points throughout the original game, each one following events in the same order as they would appear in normal game-play, with extended and entirely new dialogue added to enhance the story. Background music featured on the album consists of unaltered tracks from the game's soundtrack, and sets the mood and location of each scene.

Originally meant to be the first part in a series of similar albums, Wild Arms Drama vol. 1 remained the only drama CD released for the original Wild Arms for four years until it was re-released in 2002 with the "volume" designation removed. This album later began the trend of issuing only a single drama album for successive games of the Wild Arms series.
