= Kadingir =

Kadingir or Ka Dingir is the Sumerian name for Babylon.

It may also refer to:

- Kadingir, a fictional superweapon in the anime television series Symphogear
- Kadingir Sanctum, a location in the 2016 video game DOOM
- Ka Dingel, a distortion of the original Sumerian word, pertaining to the penultimate dungeon in the 1996 video game Wild Arms
