= WA2 =

WA2 may refer to:

- White Album 2, a visual novel in two parts
- Wild Arms 2, a role-playing game for the PlayStation
- WA2, a postcode district in Warrington, England
