= WA4 =

WA4 may refer to:

- Washington's 4th congressional district
- Washington State Route 4
- Wild Arms 4, a role-playing video game
- WA4, a postcode district in Warrington, England; see WA postcode area
