= WA3 =

WA3 may refer to:

- Washington's 3rd congressional district
- Washington State Route 3
- Wild Arms 3, a role-playing video game
- WA3, a postcode district in Warrington, England; see WA postcode area
