= Wild Arms: Twilight Venom =

Japanese anime television series

- Wild Arms (anime) poster

ワイルドアームズTV (Wairudo Āmuzu TV)
- Genre: Adventure, space Western
- Anime television series
- Directed by: Itsuro Kawasaki
- Written by: Akemi Omode; Aya Matsui; Chinatsu Houjou; Hideki Mitsui; Itsuro Kawasaki; Kenji Kamiyama; Shōtarō Suga; Yoshimi Narita
- Music by: Ko Otani
- Studio: Bee Train
- Licensed by: US: ADV Films
- Original network: WOWOW
- English network: US: Anime Network
- Original run: 18 October 1999 – 27 March 2000
- Episodes: 22

Wild Arms: Twilight Venom (ワイルドアームズ トワイライトヴェノム) is a Japanese animated television series based on the Wild Arms series of video games. The series was animated by Bee Train, and directed by Itsuro Kawasaki and Kōichi Mashimo. Twilight Venom aired on WOWOW from October 18, 1999, to March 27, 2000, totaling 22 episodes.

== Plot ==
The story follows the exploits of a gunslinger named Sheyenne Rainstorm, who is trapped in the body of a 10-year-old boy. He is hunting for his old body, equipped with the powerful ARMS weapon, which is one of the most destructive weapons in the world that very few people can use. In the first episode, he escapes imprisonment with the scientist Kiel Aronnax, a vampire (called Crimson Nobles in this series) girl Mirabelle, and a magic-card-using dame Loretta. They are also accompanied by two mouse-like creatures. The series follows Sheyenne and his newfound allies as they unravel the mystery of Sheyenne's predicament, and along the way, they discover more about the ARMS weapon and how it can change the fate of the world.

== Characters ==
- Sheyenne Rainstorm is a famous gunslinger with the ability to use mysterious ARMS weapons. He was rumored to have been a reincarnation from the Evil Race due to his birthmark on his back and his ability to remain unharmed when using the ARMS. 3 years before the series started, he was mysteriously shot, and his brain transplanted into the body of a 10-year-old. His original body was moved somewhere else, and Sheyenne spends the entire series looking for it. As an adult, Sheyenne was a vain playboy who easily attracted the attention of women due to his handsome visage. After being reborn, he constantly laments the loss of such attention throughout the series. He travels mainly with Kiel and Isaac, but frequently meets the female thieves by accident. He and Loretta often butt heads. Voiced by: Mayumi Asano (Japanese); Brianne Siddall (English).
- Dr. Kiel Aronnax is a scientist who had been imprisoned and tortured at Alcatraz. He eventually escapes due to the distraction of Loretta's group infiltrating the prison and leads them to the treasure—which turns out to be a sleeping Sheyenne—afterward. He goes along to help Sheyenne find his body. Unlike the common scientist stereotype, Kiel has the build of a brawler, and the skills to beat down his opponents. At the same time, Kiel does serve as the moral compass and the occasional father figure, much to the chagrin of Sheyenne, who's commonly mistaken as his son within the group. Kiel also has his fair share of secrets, the biggest of which involves Sheyenne. Voiced by: Junpei Morita (Japanese); Jamieson Price (English).
- Loretta Oratorio is a thief and crest sorceress, she spends her time with Mirabelle and Jerusha stealing from the rich and treasure hunting. To her chagrin, they frequently run into Sheyenne's group and, as a result, often lose the treasure. So much so that both Loretta and Mirabelle dubbed Sheyenne the "God of Poverty" and resolved to run away the next time they saw him. Loretta is aware of her beauty, and one of her most common ploys is to use her body to distract unwary victims before robbing them. She is not without skills, however, as shown in episode 9, "The Slave of the Game," where she becomes the top female grappler. She is a proficient crest sorceress but is limited by her obsession with the monetary value of the crest. As a thief and treasure hunter, Loretta is prone to doing nearly anything to get to the valuables, up to and including pretending to be a long-lost heiress and joining an all-female robbery gang. However, she has shown to adhere to a moral code when it comes to obtaining crests and is visibly outraged when someone has broken it. Voiced by: Fumiko Osaka (Japanese); Wendee Lee (English).
- Mirabelle Graceland is a member of the vampire-like race, the Crimson Nobles. She and Loretta make their living stealing and treasure-hunting. She seems to have a slight crush on Sheyenne, though that might be because she (and every other Crimson Noble) finds his blood incredibly delicious. Crimson Nobles can transform into strange bat-like creatures, and Mirabelle often transforms easily between the two forms, though others have remarked on her slow flying. Voiced by: Nariko Fujieda (Japanese); Julie Maddalena (English).
- Jerusha is a 5000-year-old Popepi Pipepo who assists Loretta and Mirabelle during their travels. Jerusha has been married 5 or 6 times, one of which is to Issac. The two argue whenever they meet, and Jerusha regularly flouts Issac's tentative moves to rekindle their relationship. Despite the antagonism, Jerusha does harbor similar feelings towards Issac (whom she calls Isaku, to his annoyance). Voiced by: Rikako Aikawa (Japanese); Philece Sampler (English).
- Isaac is a 5000-year-old Popepi Pipepo who assists Sheyenne and Kiel during his travels. He first appears in a cage at a market stall, though it's later revealed that the shop is his and the shopkeeper his apprentice. Due to the low numbers of Popepi Pipepo, he becomes interested when Sheyenne mentions meeting a female Popei Pipepo and decides to leave with them in hopes of meeting her. To his dismay, it's his ex-wife, Jerusha. However, even though Issac treats Jerusha like an enemy, he still harbors feelings for her and has even remarked that being married was the happiest time of his life. Voiced by: Mitsuo Iwata (Japanese); Steven Blum (English).

== Episodes ==
1. Sleeping Dirty
2. ARMS Crazy
3. Desert Dragon Fantasy
4. The Faluna Bible
5. Portrait of Lana
6. Affair of the Fargaia Express
7. Someday My Robber Will Come
8. Mouth Wide Shut
9. The Slave of the Game
10. Guilty or...
11. No Home, No Body
12. Lie, Laila, Lie
13. Lullaby of the Noble-Red
14. Interview With The Ampire
15. Natural Born Angel
16. Fatal Goddess
17. Child at Heart
18. The Days of the Bacchus
19. Gone with the Smoke
20. Faluna Struck
21. Once Upon a Time in Fargaia
22. The Last of Sheyenne

=== Volumes ===
The series was also distributed on five DVD compilation volumes titles. The first was 125 minutes, the following four were 100 each:

- Volume 1: The Good, The Bad and The Greedy (1–5) 5eps
- Volume 2: Western Romance (6–9) 4eps
- Volume 3: The Return of Laila (10–13) 4eps
- Volume 4: Lie, Cheat & Steal (14–17) 4eps
- Volume 5: Sheyennes Last Stand (18–22) 5eps

The "Complete Collection" was divided into 4 discs: 1–5, 6–10, 11-16 and 17-22 (5/5/6/6 eps)

== Relation to the Wild Arms game series ==
Twilight Venom borrowed a few concepts from Wild Arms - such as the ARMs only being usable to certain individuals, and Faluna being similar to Malduke - but most crossover characters were from Wild Arms 2. Models of Liz and Ard are visible inside a monster museum in episode 11, "No Home, No Body." Judecca makes an appearance in episode 15 (a character with the likeness of Zed from the first Wild Arms also appears) and Kanon in episode 17. Marivel is briefly mentioned in episodes 13 and 19. Irving Vold Valeria and the Guardian Lucied appear in episode 16, but unlike all other cameos, they become series regulars and progress the storyline.
