= Penny Blood =

Upcoming video game

- Developers: Yukikaze; Shade; Studio Wildrose
- Director: Matsuzo Machida
- Designer: Matsuzo Machida
- Artists: Miyako Kato; Nobutaka Hanya; Masato Watanabe
- Writer: Matsuzo Machida
- Composers: Yoshitaka Hirota; Akari Kaida; Nobuo Uematsu; Kenji Ito
- Platforms: PlayStation 5; Windows; Xbox Series X/S
- Genre: Role-playing

Penny Blood (Note: Japanese: ペニーブラッド, Hepburn: Penī Buraddo) is an upcoming role-playing video game co-developed by Yukikaze, Shade, and Studio Wildrose. It is planned for release for PlayStation 5, Windows, and Xbox Series X/S. As a spiritual successor to the Shadow Hearts series, the game follows magically-gifted detective Matthew Farrell during the 1920s as he investigates supernatural events stretching across America, Europe, and Asia. It carries over several gameplay elements including turn-based battles infused with real-time elements, and lead character Matthew transforming into a powerful "fusion monster" during combat.

Many Shadow Hearts staff returned to develop Penny Blood, including series creator Matsuzo Machida, character designer and illustrator Miyako Kato, and Yoshitaka Hirota as lead composer. Machida created Penny Blood to express similar concepts to those explored in Shadow Hearts, though aimed at an adult audience. The project was revealed as part of a "Double Kickstarter" alongside Wild Arms creator Akifumi Kaneko's project Armed Fantasia. The project was successfully funded within a day of the campaign going live.

== Premise and gameplay ==
Penny Blood is an upcoming role-playing video game set in an alternate version of the 1920s infused with elements of Gothic horror. The lead protagonist is Matthew Farrell, a private detective based in New York; he inherited the power to transform into powerful monster-like beings from his father, and while he hates this ability he uses it in service to the Bureau of Investigation to combat supernatural threats born from Malice. Following an outbreak of monsters at an asylum, he ends up on a mission spanning from the Americas to Europe and Asia pursuing a dangerous criminal. He is joined by the half-mechanical Emilia Dawson of the British Secret Intelligence Service, and Suseri Otsuki of the fictional Japanese Kamuzumi organization.

Gameplay features Matthew travelling between different locations across the world via an overworld map, exploring dungeons around those locations, and fighting enemies. Battles use a turn-based combat system, with actions triggering a real-time button minigame dubbed Psycho Sigil; hitting areas on the titular Sigil with the right timing fulfils the attack. Each character has a limited number of Sanity Points which decrease each turn, with the character gaining a boost in attack when their Sanity is depleted but at the cost of being unable to control them.

== Planning and development ==
Penny Blood was created by Matsuzo Machida as a spiritual successor to Shadow Hearts, a series developed by Sacnoth and released between 2001 and 2005. Following the release of Shadow Hearts: From the New World, the development team left to become independent, with Machida and series artist Miyako Kato founding Studio Wildrose. Machida created the storyline and concepts as an alternate expression of the themes and mechanics he created for Shadow Hearts, though aiming it at an adult audience. His intention was to take the darker themes which had been gradually removed from Shadow Hearts as far as they could go within a mature game, though some comedic elements will be retained as in Shadow Hearts: Covenant. While some terminology such as Malice and Sanity Points carried over, there was no other connection to Shadow Hearts. The game's title is derived from another name for the penny dreadful style of serial literature popular during the 19th century, while the logo included a reference to coins placed with the dead.

Planning and pre-production for Penny Blood began in 2021. The game is being co-developed by Studio Wildrose, the newly-founded Yukikaze, and third-party developer Shade. Machida acted as director, lead designer and scenario writer. Kato returned as art director and character designer, with Nobutaka Hanya joining as monster designer and Masato Watanabe as a concept artist. Shadow Hearts composer Yoshitaka Hirota returned as lead composer, with Akira Kaida also contributing music. Guest composers Nobuo Uematsu and Kenji Ito were also announced to be a part of the project, creating music for American and Japanese locations respectively. The setting was chosen due to Machida's fascination with the period, which many countries surviving to the present day with changed attitudes and relationships. When creating the Fusion concept for Penny Blood, Machida used the theme of "holy" figures in tales as opposed to the demonic inspiration of Shadow Hearts. Kato's character designs reflected the darker tone with a desaturated color palette and designs drawing from American comic books, with "Obscurity" being the key word for the overall visual designer.

Machida and Wild Arms creator Akifumi Kaneko met through a mutual friend during early planning for Penny Blood, learning that Kaneko wanted to create a Wild Arms spiritual successor titled Armed Fantasia. Inspired by the success of Eiyuden Chronicle: Hundred Heroes on Kickstarter in 2020, it was decided to both fund and gauge interest in the projects through crowdfunding. As there might be trouble funding each project individually, the two decided to team up for a "Double Kickstarter" which would fund both games. The Kickstarter campaign was announced on August 26,2022 going live two days later on August 29 with a combined budget of $750,000 to fund both projects initially for Windows; alongside the co-funding, the team also implemented separate funding tiers and stretch goals for the two games. The funding goal was reached in under 20 hours, and the stretch goal for console versions for PlayStation 5 and Xbox Series X/S was funded the following day. When the campaign closed on September 30, it had generated over $2.6 million in funding, clearing all its advertised stretch goals for both games. The stretch goals included a New Game+, additional quests and gameplay mechanics, minigames, crossover items with Armed Fantasia, and a sequel novel detailing post-game events. Machida planned for Penny Blood to release during 2025. A companion title, Penny Blood: Hellbound, was released in early access in March 2024. Hellbound is a roguelike action game that serves as a prequel to the main game.

In May 2024, Machida and Studio Wildrose filed a lawsuit against Ben Judd and Dangen Entertainment, who managed the double Kickstarter campaign, over breach of contract for failing to disburse production funds earned from the Kickstarter. As of 2026, the game has been unable to secure a publisher due to these issues.
