= Crime Crackers =

1994 video game

- Developer: Media.Vision (Note: Sony Computer Entertainment Japan assisted on development.)
- Publisher: Sony Computer Entertainment
- Producer: Takashi Fukushima
- Designers: Akira Satou; Toshiyuki Miyata; Yukio Nagasaki
- Programmers: Michelle Ahiko; Yuji Takahashi
- Artists: Akemi Isagawa; Keiko Matsushita; Yūichirō Suzuki
- Composer: Noriyuki Asakura
- Platform: PlayStation
- Release: JP: December 3, 1994
- Genres: First-person shooter, action role-playing
- Mode: Single-player

Crime Crackers (Note: Japanese: クライムクラッカーズ, Hepburn: Kuraimu Kurakkāzu) is a 1994 action role-playing first-person shooter video game developed by Media.Vision and published by Sony Computer Entertainment for the PlayStation. Based on a science fiction manga set after an intergalactic war, the story follows of group of bounty hunters aboard the spacecraft Pink Dolphin as they take on jobs requested by the Galactic Federation police. Gameplay resembles dungeon crawlers, largely consisting of exploring complex 3D corridors, collecting items, and shooting enemies. The player is able to freely rotate between three unique characters within missions, while points earned afterwards can be used to purchase consumable items and upgraded equipment.

Production was helmed by Media.Vision co-founder Takashi Fukushima, who had established the company in 1993 upon learning of Sony's intent to release its debut console the following year. Sony provided support through its own newly founded Japan Studio with development entailing a very short period to meet the console's launch.

Crime Crackers was released exclusively in Japan on December 3, 1994. Critical reception was mixed regarding its graphics and its attempt at combining two distinct gameplay genres. A sequel, Crime Crackers 2, was released in Japan in 1997. Both games were made available on the PlayStation Network in 2007.

== Gameplay ==
Crime Crackers is a first-person shooter with light RPG elements that is structured like a dungeon crawler. The game consists of a linear set of missions, each involving the exploration of maze-like, 3D corridors filled with useful items, environmental hazards, hostile enemies, and occasional end-stage bosses. The player controls a party of three playable characters that move together as a single unit, though each have their own health meter. The character in the middle serves as the leader while the other two characters are inactive, but their positions can be quickly swapped. Only the leader can attack enemies and receive direct damage, although inactive characters can still take damage if the group is hit from the side offscreen. The player can rotate and move both forward and backward using the controller's D-pad, as well as strafe while also using the shoulder buttons.

The player shoots an enemy using Emilia as the leader. The player has limited movement while the firing crosshair is visible.

Shooting enemies demands entering a battle stance. Doing so brings up a moveable crosshair cursor controlled with the D-pad, but the player cannot advance forward or backward while in this mode. Pressing and holding the L1 and R1 shoulders buttons lets the player defend to reduce or eliminate damage from enemies. Each character can equip different types of weapons with two of the trio sharing an ammunition pool called "Gun Energy". Emilia utilizes small handguns that are relatively weak and can be shot rapidly by holding down the attack button. Dolan carries heavier guns that are more powerful, require more ammunition, and are fired once per button press. The third member, Leeza, wields swords that have a much shorter range but do not require Gun Energy. All characters possess a strong, special attack that can damage all enemies on the screen.

The player has an inventory for items discovered throughout each mission such as key cards for unlocking doors and scarce health restoratives and ammunition refills. Items that permanently increase Gun Energy capacity or a specific character's maximum health can also be found. At the end of a mission the player is given a score in "Cracker Points" based on the number of enemies defeated and how much of the map was explored. Performing better in this regard may increase the party's rank, which allows members to adorn upgraded weapons and armor. The player is also rewarded with credits that can be exchanged between missions for consumable items, equipment, and accessories.

== Plot ==
Crime Crackers is based on the Monthly Shōnen Captain manga Chō Hikari Seiki Star Crackers by Kokomahi. Set in the distant future and in a far away galaxy, the story begins 20 years after the end of large-scale, intergalactic war. Though it is mostly peaceful, the Galactic Federation police have difficulty controlling all crime on its own. A system is established in which the Galaxy Police partner with bounty hunter groups colloquially known as "crackers" to maintain order. One such group are those aboard the starship Pink Dolphin. They are led by protagonist Emilia F. Alkanet (Note: Japanese: エミリア・F・アルカネット, Hepburn: Emiria F Arukanetto), a genius young woman from a prestigious family who is in search of her missing brother Cain and dreams of one day rising to the ranks of the legendary Cosmo Guardians. The second core member is Dolan (Note: Japanese: ドラン, Hepburn: Doran), a dragon-like military veteran who served Emelia's grandfather during the war and was assigned to watch over her afterwards. The final core member is Leeza (Note: Japanese: リーザ, Hepburn: Rīza), a fox girl and knight who was exiled from her planet before joining Emelia's crew. Three other members of the Pink Dolphin act as support for the main trio. The ship's pilot is Parrot (Note: Japanese: パロット, Hepburn: Parotto), a birdman and former pilot of the ship Dolan during the war whose side hobby is hunting ancient treasures of his ancestors. Core Log (Note: Japanese: コア・ログ, Hepburn: Koa Rogu) is a robot in charge of the ship's navigation, engineering, and weapons. He also acts as a storage unit for the final member, Potpourri Vamp (Note: Japanese: ポプリ・ヴァンプ, Hepburn: Popuri Vu~anpu), a computerized lifeform ("cyber elf") who aids the team in data purposes like electronic lockpicking.

== Development and release ==
Crime Crackers was the first game developed Media.Vision. The game would be published by Sony Computer Entertainment (SCE) and development support was provided by Sony's internal development team. Media.Vision's founder and president Takashi Fukushima previously worked at Telenet Japan and dreamed of going independent. He eventually met Akira Satou, former SCE chairman and game developer at Sony Music Entertainment. Satou told him that Sony was investing in the development of its first home console, the PlayStation. Fukushima took the opportunity to establish Media.Vision in 1993. Media.Vision began producing Crime Crackers right after Golden Week of 1994 and aimed to release the game alongside the launch of the PlayStation on December 3 of that year.

Development took a mere seven months, a fairly short time thanks to an already-established setting and characters, which were adapted from the manga Chō Hikari Seiki Star Crackers by Kokomahi. Fukushima admitted to still being under a great deal of pressure to meet the launch deadline. Crime Crackers took advantage of the PlayStation's 3D graphical capabilities in its first-person, dungeon crawl gameplay. The same technology was utilized to create the 3D battles for Media.Vision's seminal 1996 RPG Wild Arms. Fukushima lamented that the team did not use the ending animated cutscene of Crime Crackers (produced by Studio Sign) as its opening instead, but stated at the time he did not want to give players a bad first impression in case the animation's quality was poor.

The game's music was composed by Noriyuki Asakura, who would gain notoriety through his work on the Rurouni Kenshin anime adaptation and the Tenchu series. Crime Crackers was Asakura's first work on a video game. He was approached about the score by a former colleague who was working at Sony at the time. Asakura claimed that although the company was new to hardware development, they were known for music production and did not want to release an inferior product in that regard. Crime Crackers utilized exactly half its sound from the console's SPU and half from redbook audio. The game's features two vocal themes, "Crime Crackers" and "Legend of the Stars" (Note: Japanese: 星たちの伝説, Hepburn: Hoshi Tachi no Densetsu), both performed by pop artist Yuko Anai. The songs were released as a single ahead of the game on November 21, 1994. The 17-song official soundtrack was released on July 1, 1995 by Antinos Records. A spin-off light novel titled Crime Crackers Gaiden was written by Norio Nakai and released in April 1996 as part of the "Famitsu Game Bunko" label from publisher Aspect.

Crime Crackers never saw an international release, possibly due to Sony's lack of financial confidence in a game with such a short development time and a heavy anime-inspired aesthetic amidst the early days of the PlayStation. Prior to the console going to retail in North America and Europe, Sony executive director Phil Harrison specifically pointed to Crime Crackers as a launch underperformer and "not indicative of the products that are coming down the line." The game was made available on PlayStation 3 via the Japanese PlayStation Network on October 24, 2007. The game was also made available for download on the PlayStation Store on the Sony Xperia Android smartphone line in Japan on October 26, 2011.

== Reception ==
Reception

Review scores
Publication	Score
Consoles +	68%
Computer and Video Games	53%
Famitsu	23/40
Joypad	90%
Next Generation	2/5 stars 1/5 stars
Dengeki PlayStation	85/100, 75/100, 75/100, 75/100
Electronic Entertainment	1/5 stars
Game Amusement Pleasure	45%

Crime Crackers has garnered a mixed response from journalists since its late 1994 release, most of which covered it as an import title. Journalists focused on its anime aesthetic and its blend of light RPG gameplay mechanics with first-person shooter elements found in 1993's Doom. In a scoreless review, GameFan editor Dave Halverson (under the pseudonym "E. Storm") called the game "tight", "well thought-out" and "quite spectacular" for a launch title. He praised its visuals and audio, proclaiming it proof that the Sony's first console would be destined to compete with industry giants Nintendo and Sega. The game also received some positive remarks from Nourdine "Trazom" Nini of Joypad and Maxime Roure of Consoles +, two French magazines that scored it 90% and 68% respectively. Both critics enjoyed its 3D model animation and game length. However, Nini found the core graphics and music extremely repetitive. Roure disliked the truncated movement while shooting enemies and felt the game would do little to help 32-bit consoles reach new heights, contrasting Harvelson's opinion.

Other reviewers were much more negative towards Crime Crackers overall. Computer and Video Games (CVG) offered a below average score of 53%, complaining that the choice of its three characters added little variety to its perceived dull gameplay. Next Generation agreed with this notion regarding its characters. The magazine initially rated the game two out of five stars, describing it as "a perfect argument against mixing two game genres" and "a disappointment to the action fan, and an effortless breeze for an experienced role player". A later issue of Next Generation decreased the rating to one star, considered it a potential waste of time, and reiterated it as "a Doom-clone/RPG that manages to capture the worst elements of both genres, with few redeeming qualities." Peter Olafson of Electronic Entertainment similarly concluded, "All I can say is 'Don't waste your time.' The anime characters in this role-player are just too cute for words, and the 3-D scrolling graphics aren't anything special." Mike Salmon of Game Players considered its controls "wonky" and graphics "average", concluding that there much better offerings on 16-bit platforms. Onn Lee of Game Amusement Pleasure concluded that it is an "average Doom-style game let down by awful controls".

== Sequel ==
A direct sequel, Crime Crackers 2, was developed by Media.Vision and published by SCE exclusively in Japan for the PlayStation on November 27, 1997. The story takes place two years after Crime Crackers and focuses on Team Guppy, a quintet of bounty hunters following in the footsteps of the first game's Team Pink Dolphin. It features much of same gameplay as its predecessor with some new features. The number of playable characters has increased from three to eight while he player's party is increased to four members at any given time. Height has been added to the dungeons, which now contain slopes, pitfalls, and open-air rooms. This third axis allows the player to look up and down while aiming. Alongside their unique main weapons, characters have sub-weapons that can be used to perform actions like finding items.

Noriyuki Asakura returned as music composer, contributing two vocal songs performed by the game's voice actresses. The official soundtrack was published by Ayers and distributed by Bandai on January 21, 1998. A serial radio drama, which had been broadcast on TBS Radio, was released on CD by Sony on January 21, 1998 as well. Crime Crackers 2 was re-released through the Japanese PlayStation Network on December 26, 2007.
