= Wild Arms =

Japanese media franchise

- Genres: Role-playing; Tactical role-playing
- Developers: Media.Vision; Contrail; ForwardWorks
- Publishers: Sony Computer Entertainment; Ubisoft; Agetec; Xseed Games; 505 Games
- Platforms: PlayStation, PlayStation 2, PlayStation Portable, PlayStation Classic, PlayStation Vita, PlayStation 4
- First release: Wild Arms; December 20, 1996
- Latest release: Wild Arms: Million Memories; September 26, 2018

Wild Arms (ワイルドアームズ, Wairudo Āmuzu), stylized as Wild ARMs, is a media franchise developed by Media.Vision and owned by Sony Computer Entertainment. The franchise consists of several role-playing video games and related media. Since the launch of the original Wild Arms title in 1996, the series has gone on to encompass several media, including toys, manga, mobile phone applications, and a 22-episode anime.

The series has largely been overseen by producer Akifumi Kaneko. It saw regular releases throughout the late 1990s and 2000s. Following its last major entry, Wild Arms XF, in 2007, it became dormant save for a crossover mobile game, Wild Arms: Million Memories, released a decade later. Kaneko crowdfunded an open world spiritual successor, Armed Fantasia, in 2022, alongside Naruke and other series veterans, though the title was cancelled in 2026.

== Series development ==
=== Production ===
Wild Arms was the first role-playing video game project of Media.Vision, a company that had been known primarily for their shooter game series Crime Crackers and Rapid Reload. Looking for a way to capitalize on the growing role-playing game market of the mid-1990s, Sony commissioned Media.Vision to create a game that would combine elements of a traditional RPG with limited 3D graphics to promote the hardware of their newly released PlayStation console. Supervised and designed primarily by Akifumi Kaneko and Takashi Fukushima, 1996's Wild Arms, while still retaining traditional two-dimensional characters and backgrounds, became one of the first role-playing titles released to showcase 3D battle sequences.

Drawing inspiration from manga such as Yasuhiro Nightow's Trigun, Kaneko and Fukushima crafted a video game world that resembles the contemporary fantasy environment seen in similar titles. References to seminal role-playing game elements influenced by European fantasy such as castles, magic, dragons, and monsters, were added to attract players to a familiar concept, as well as allow scenario writers from other projects. Other cultural and regional influences include Norse mythology, animism, and Japanese mythology.

=== Music ===
The background music of Wild Arms is reminiscent of Western films. The groundwork for the series' music was laid by composer Michiko Naruke, who had previously only written the scores to Super Nintendo Entertainment System titles. Recurring instrumentation includes acoustic guitars, mandolins, drums, woodwind and brass instruments, and pianos, accompanied by clapping and whistling samples. While classically influenced, the music of each game often diverges into other genres, including folk, rock, electronic, swing, and choral. Naruke composed the soundtracks for the first three Wild Arms titles herself, yet she contributed to the soundtrack for Wild Arms 4 along with Nobuyuki Shimizu, Ryuta Suzuki, and Masato Kouda, who emulated her now-established style. Music for Wild Arms 5, the only video game title where Naruke did not contribute, was provided by Kouda along with series newcomer Noriyasu Agematsu.

== Recurring themes ==
Rudy brandishing an ARM from Wild Arms Alter Code: F

The usage of firearms factors heavily into the Wild Arms mythos. Called "ARMs", these weapons are often associated with ancient technology and represent a more violent and warlike age; thus, a social stigma is often given to anyone possessing or using them. Though the exact nature varies from one game to the next, they are seen as highly destructive devices with an array of functions in battle. The practical usage of ARMs, either to protect or destroy life, is left to the user's discretion, and serves as a plot point within each game to establish a character's true motives.

Environmentalism and War are also key factors in many Wild Arms games, which often center around the restoration of the environment that has long since been tainted, either by warfare or natural phenomena. The governing forces of the planet are personified as "Guardians", spirit-like anthropomorphic creatures who act as the gods of natural aspects such as water, fire, and wind, along with human traits such as love, hope, and courage. The primary heroes of each game often ally themselves with these Guardians to defeat technology-reliant or ecologically unconscious villains who would either subjugate or destroy the world to suit their respective goals.

=== Setting ===
Each Wild Arms story takes place on a planet called Filgaia, though each "Filgaia" appears to be an entirely separate world with a different arrangement of continents, in similar tradition to the discontinuity between games of the Final Fantasy series. Filgaia is a fantasy world containing a variety of terrain, including deserts, red rock canyons, plains, forests, mountainous regions, grasslands, and Arctic tundras, though their predominance varies from one game to the next with enties such as Wild Arms 3 and Wild Arms 4 taking place in planets mostly having fallen into desertification. Though human towns and cities are plentiful, the wilderness that encompasses most of the landscape is riddled with monsters and other beasts, as well as ruins or dungeons from earlier eras that house ancient treasures inaccessible to all but skilled adventurers. Filgaia is also home to a number of different races including the Native American-inspired Baskars, nature-dwelling Elws, and vampiric Crimson Nobles.

=== Elw ===
The Elw (pronounced el-loo) are a demi-human race who appear human, with the exception of their long ears. Because of their close relationship with nature, the Elw live exceptionally long lives. Due to the destruction of the environment, the Elw population is extremely low.

The Elw were the original inhabitants of Filgaia. When the neosapiens (humans) migrated to Filgaia after a war on their home world, the Elw kindly accepted them.

Around a thousand years before the events of Wild Arms, Filgaia was invaded by a race known as the Metal Demons. The Elw joined together with the other inhabitants of Filgaia, the humans and Guardians, in order to expel the invaders. Eventually, the Metal Demon leader "Mother" was defeated and the Metal Demons were pushed back to the northernmost part of Filgaia.

During the war, the Elw developed many weapons using their knowledge of magic, alchemy, and technology. Most of these weapons later became known as ARMs. The Elw also created the large humanoid machines called Golems. The Golems proved very useful during the first Demon War. However, the Golems were unreliable because they determined friend and foe based on whoever was operating them. This flaw was later exploited by the Metal Demons during the second Demon War and was the main reason the Elws created the Holmcross. The Elw created the Holmcross using living metal based on the Metal Demons'. The Holmcross went on a rampage, and all but one were destroyed by the Elw. The final weapon the Elw created was the Guardian Blade. When the Guardian Blade was activated, it sucked the vitality out of part of the planet and started the decay that would slowly turn Filgaia into a barren wasteland that would soon be impossible for the Elw, who were dependent on nature, to live on. This and the Elw distrust of humans led to the creation of the Elw Dimension and the Elw's evacuation of Filgaia. The last known Elw founded Baskar village.

=== Ragu O Ragula ===
A recurring optional boss enemy throughout the series is the legendary Ragu O Ragula, known as the "King of the Monsters". He is strongly hinted at being an alien lifeform, as he has "traveled the stars". In each Wild ARMs game, he is the ultimate extra boss. In games in which the Abyss — a sometimes ridiculously long optional dungeon that appears in many of the games — is present, he will be at the end of that dungeon. The player is not often given many clues to find him, but he is always alluded to in a few bookshelves throughout the game. When defeated, Ragu usually bestows upon the player the iconic Sheriff Star accessory, which not only proves the player's valor, but also tends to make the remainder of the game quite easy when equipped due to its effects. This trend was broken in Wild Arms 5, in which when defeated, Ragu drops a badge called "The Omega".

== Games ==
Release timeline
1996	Wild Arms
1997
1998
1999	Wild Arms 2
2000
2001
2002	Wild Arms 3
2003	Wild Arms Alter Code: F
2004
2005	Wild Arms 4
2006	Wild Arms 5
2007	Wild Arms XF
2008
2009
2010
2011
2012
2013
2014
2015
2016
2017
2018	Wild Arms: Million Memories

=== Main series ===
As a Sony franchise, all Wild Arms video games appear exclusively on PlayStation video game consoles. Each individual title is set in the world of Filgaia and contains several consistencies that have become series mainstays, including similar races, monsters, technologies, and plot points. Only two of the titles directly allude to any chronology, as each game bears a Filgaia unrecognizable from each prior title.

- Wild Arms established many of the recurring themes seen in later installments, including the desert world of Filgaia, and gun-like machinery called "ARMs". It introduced the "tool" system, in which special items such as bombs or grappling hooks can be used out of combat to cross otherwise impassable terrain and destroy objects. Originally released in Japan for the PlayStation in 1996, the game was published in North America and the PAL region over the next two years by Sony Computer Entertainment. Wild Arms features two-dimensional characters and environments for normal gameplay, while battle sequences are instead rendered in full 3D. The game follows the adventures of a band of "Dream Chasers", Rudy, Jack, and Cecilia, as they make their way across the desert-like world of Filgaia. Contacted by the Avatars of the forces of nature that protect the world, the heroes are chosen to be humankind's champions in the face of a demon invasion.
- Wild Arms 2, the sequel to the first Wild Arms, was the second and final title for the original PlayStation. While keeping many of the themes from the previous title, Wild Arms 2 introduced additional science fiction elements, including more abundant high technology and cybernetics, with additional fantasy and steampunk themes. A total of six characters can be recruited, with the player able to switch between any of them at any time. While characters remained in 2D, environments such as dungeons and towns were now rendered in isometric 3D. Wild Arms 2 involves a group of international peace-keepers known as "Operation ARMS" that are assigned by a wealthy benefactor to protect the world from the terrorist organization Odessa. The player assumes control of each member of ARMS as they make their way through the game, and eventually confront an ancient evil that once threatened to destroy all of Filgaia.
- Wild Arms 3 is the first Wild Arms game for the PlayStation 2 console and the first title to be presented entirely using 3D cel-shaded graphics. Though combat remains turn-based, a minor addition to the battle system, the "crossfire sequence", gives the appearance that characters and enemies are moving around the battlefield between rounds. The game takes place on a desert world almost totally devoid of large bodies of water, where roving bands of adventurers and outlaws roam the land in search of vast fortune, either through robberies or treasure hunting. Four strangers united by circumstance, Virginia, Jet, Clive and Gallows are the main characters who must confront a group of mystics trying to revive the world, and a demon who would have it destroyed.
- Wild Arms Alter Code: F was released for the PlayStation 2 as an enhanced remake of the original Wild Arms. It features an expanded script, additional story sequences, and a re-recorded soundtrack by Naruke. While all the previous locations from the initial version return, they are now presented in full 3D with new layouts and puzzles. New gameplay additions from Wild Arms 3 include the Migrant System for avoiding battles, and the Crossfire Sequence added to combat.
- Wild Arms 4, also released for the PlayStation 2, takes a more action game-like approach to the series, including environments that only allow horizontal movement, and the ability to run, jump, and slide past obstacles. The tool system is absent for the first time, and combat sequences are handled dramatically different from previous games. Utilizing the "Hex System", battlefields are now made up of seven equally-sized hexagons that characters may move between each combat round, allowing the player to attack enemies or aid allies stationed in adjacent hexes. The story follows the journey of Jude, a young boy from an isolated village who is the unwilling owner of a secretly-developed ARM weapon and now on the run from the government. He is joined by his companions Yulie, Arnaud, and Raquel as they embark on a quest to re-unite Jude with his mother, as well as defeat a number of superhuman government agents with a hidden plot involving the safety of the world.
- Wild Arms 5, the final title for the PlayStation 2, makes further use of Wild Arms 4's HEX combat system with minor adjustments, including a combat party of no more than three characters. Released in Japan in December 2006, the game was released in North America by XSEED Games in August 2007. A PAL-region version was published by 505 Games in limited quantities only available in France, Italy, Spain and the UK. The story concerns Dean Stark, a 16-year-old adventurer from a village specializing in collecting lost technology, and his friend Rebecca who discover a mysterious amnesiac young woman named Avril outside town. The duo agrees to help Avril in her quest to recover her memory, while Dean commits himself to learning how to use ARMs so he may one day become a successful "Golem Hunter", a finder of ancient robotic giants.
- Wild Arms XF is the series' first handheld title, developed for the PlayStation Portable. Unlike the other titles, it is a tactical role-playing game. The story centers around Clarissa Arwin, the leader of the Chevalet Blanc knights, who is swept up into a political war when she travels to the Kingdom of Elesius to retrieve her mother's sword.

=== Mobile ===
Wild Arms Mobile is a series of Flash-based mobile phone games distributed by Yahoo! Keitai, I-Mode, and EZWeb for the NTT DoCoMo cellphone brand in Japan. First developed in 2006, the download-to-play service includes two Wild Arms-themed minigames: a Tetris-style puzzle game, and Wild Arms Kōya no Nichō Kenjū, a shooting game featuring characters and locations from Wild Arms 3. Additional downloadable features include backgrounds, calendar skins, music, and visual styles based on several Wild Arms games. A routine news feed can also be accessed with information from Sony Computer Entertainment.

Wild Arms: Million Memories was released for smart phones in Japan on September 26, 2018. The game was developed by ForwardWorks and features characters from various Wild Arms games. The game was shut down February 27, 2020.

=== Spiritual successor ===
Armed Fantasia, a crowdfunded indie spiritual successor to the series, was announced in 2022 by Kaneko, who had not developed a game in the 15 years since Wild Arms XF. Developed by Wild Bunch Productions, its music was planned to be composed by Elements Garden and long-time series composers such as Michiko Naruke. It was fully funded in a "double Kickstarter" along with the Shadow Hearts-inspired JRPG Penny Blood. Armed Fantasia was planned to include an open-world environment, but with a story-driven approach. The game would've included the ability to chain attacks for both players and enemies.

The game would've taken place in a world afflicted by desertification and governed by the Order of the Sacred Key, which fought creatures known as Anomalies using powerful ARM weapons. The three main characters of Armed Fantasia were wandering Anomaly fighters dubbed Pathfinders, akin to Drifters in Wild Arms. They included 17-year-old street-smart protagonist Ingram Goodweather, 19-year-old Order knight Alicia Fairhead, and Euclid Sturges, a highly-intelligent 18-year-old mage. In September 2026, the project was confirmed cancelled by parent company of 505 Games, Digital Bros, after extended gaps between updates and multiple attempts at revisioning the gameplay.

== Other media ==
=== Manga ===
Cover to the Wild Arms Flower Thieves manga collection

First appearing in the Japanese Magazine Z in 2001, Wild Arms Hana Nusubito, or Wild ARMs: Flower Thieves, is a 187-page manga commissioned by Sony Computer Entertainment Japan published by Kodansha. The manga features artwork by Wakako Ōba and contains plot elements from the first two Wild Arms titles, though it is set in its own unique world. Flower Thieves takes place thousands of years after a war between humans and demons destroyed much of the life on the planet, turning the world into a scorched wasteland. Set in a dystopian future, the manga features a large group of humans on their last legs, living in the overcrowded city of Upper Hose where flowers and other flora are rare and valuable. When a plant-eating monster known as a "Flower Thief" attacks a mysterious girl named Jechika, a young boy, Maxi, must use a forbidden ARM weapon to save her, and is subsequently expelled from the city for using illegal technology. Traveling into the wilderness with Jechika and a florist named Gi, Maxi sets off on a quest to restore the balance of nature throughout the world and make the earth habitable again.

Beginning with Wild Arms 2 in 1999, official adaptations of each Wild Arms game were produced by such manga companies as DNA Media, Enix, Bros. Comics, GanGan Wing, and 4Kings for release exclusively in Japan. Each work follows the plot of each game it is based on, with minor interpretations to the original script and characters.

=== Anime ===
Wild Arms: Twilight Venom is a 22-episode anime series originally broadcast on Japan's WOWOW network from October 1999 to March 2000 produced by Studio Bee Train. Directed by Itsuro Kawasaki and Kōichi Mashimo, the series follows the adventures of two treasure hunters—Loretta, an aspiring sorceress and Mirabelle, a Crimson Noble—who stumble upon the body of Sheyenne Rainstorm, a warrior from the past reborn as a 10-year-old boy. Able to use the archaic yet powerful ARM devices found with him, Sheyenne and the others team up with gung-ho scientist Dr. Aronnax to discover the secret of his past. The series features music by Kow Otani and Sho Wada, as well as themes from the first two Wild Arms games.

=== Albums ===
Alone the World cover

In addition to commercial soundtracks for each individual game and the anime, two sets of arranged albums have been released featuring music from multiple games in the Wild Arms series. The compilation album Alone the World: Wild Arms Vocal Collection, released in July 2002, features all vocal tracks from the first three Wild Arms titles, as well as sung versions of previously instrumental songs provided by Kaori Asoh.

In celebration of the Wild Arms series 10th anniversary, Media.Vision and King Records produced two separate albums under the Wild Arms: Music the Best label which feature music from the first four Wild Arms games as well as the Twilight Venom anime. The first album, Feeling Wind, released August 2006, contains piano interpretations of various songs performed by Haruki Mino and Fumito Hirata and arranged by Yasuo Sako, and came packaged with a special edition songbook entitled Piece of Tears featuring liner notes for each track as well as interviews with long-time series composer Michiko Naruke. The second album, Rocking Heart, released the following October, is a rock and jazz-inspired remix album featuring arrangements by Nittoku Inoue, Nobuhiko Kashiwara, Nao Tokisawa, Atsushi Tomita, Transquillo, and Ryo Yonemitsu.

== Reception ==
Aggregate review scores As of July 30, 2013.
Game	GameRankings	Metacritic
Wild Arms	(PS1) 79%	
Wild Arms 2	(PS1) 68%	-
Wild Arms Alter Code: F	(PS2) 73%	(PS2) 73
Wild Arms 3	(PS2) 78%	(PS2) 78
Wild Arms 4	(PS2) 73%	(PS2) 69
Wild Arms 5	(PS2) 73%	(PS2) 71
Wild Arms XF	(PSP) 69%	(PSP) 64
Wild Arms: Million Memories	-	-

Bryan Cebulski of Hardcore Gaming 101 praised the original Wild Arms, stating that "where every sequel is thrown off balance by its flaws, the original is exactly what it wants to be: An uncomplicated mid-sized JRPG". He also said that the reoccurring Baskar tribe were some of the only playable equivalents to Native Americans in JRPGs outside of Shadow Hearts: From the New World. He called Michiko Naruke’s compositions "gorgeous" and said that despite their drawing upon Western film soundtracks, they fit very well into the RPG setting.

Cebulski stated his opinion that Wild Arms 2 was the "black sheep" of the franchise, featuring an unusually mature and ambitious plot and themes that resembles the game Xenogears and the later works of Yoko Taro, but a narrative which is "confused, at times even totally incomprehensible". He also criticized the story's lack of urgency and the villains' lack of clearly defined actions and motives, and concluded that the game "wants to be something postmodern and complex, subversive and dynamic in a way it just never shows itself being."

Cebulski said that Wild Arms 3, which lowered the amount of medieval fantasy and steampunk influence, was superior to its predecessors, saying that it was the game he recommends to new players in order to get a feel for the series due to its better pace and more competent localization than the second game. He said the characters are "tremendously endearing" and called protagonist Virginia Maxwell surprisingly progressive due to her optimism and naivety. However, he said the combat is "tedious because they’re random battles" and found it annoying that most bosses cannot be defeated in a straightforward manner, though he acknowledged this keeps the game from becoming too easy. He called its successor a "jarring change" to a more heavily sci-fi "mecha anime" setting, but one that was needed and welcome due to its older mechanics having peaked and run out of new ways to explore. He called Wild Arms 5 "a streamlined culmination of all the series has to offer ... [which] pays homage to the core of what made the series remarkable as it introduces new and sometimes improved mechanics", particularly mentioning how the ability to place hexes in formations other than hexagonal enables numerous new combinations and strategies and how the overworld allows sufficient exploration without making the game lag, but said that the series as a whole was "petering out".

In 2012, Kimberley Wallace of Game Informer called Wild Arms a "lost RPG franchise", saying the odds of a new game in the series were 25:1 due to sales potentially not meeting Sony's expectations.
