= Rapid Reload =

1995 video game

- European cover art
- Developer: Media.Vision (Note: Sony Computer Entertainment Japan assisted on development.)
- Publisher: Sony Computer Entertainment
- Producers: Shigeo Maruyama; Teruhisa Tokunaka; Takashi Fukushima
- Designers: Toshiyuki Miyata; Akira Sato; Yukio Nagasaki
- Artists: Yukihiko Itō; Keizō Shimizu
- Composer: Kazuhiko Toyama
- Platform: PlayStation
- Release: JP: April 28, 1995; EU: September 29, 1995
- Genre: Run and gun
- Mode: Single-player

Rapid Reload, known in Japan as Gunners Heaven (ガンナーズヘヴン), is a 1995 run and gun video game developed by Media.Vision and published by Sony Computer Entertainment for the PlayStation. It was released in both Japan and Europe in 1995. The game was re-released on the PlayStation Network in Japan in 2007 and in Asia in 2010.

== Gameplay ==
Gameplay screenshot

The gameplay of Rapid Reload is often compared to the Treasure game Gunstar Heroes. The players choose to play as either male character Axel or female character Ruka through the game's six levels.

The player can switch between four different weapons with a normal machine pistol, flamethrower, homing laser, and multi-directional cannons. The characters each have their own set of four weapons, totaling the weapons in the game to eight. Also available is a grappling hook that will latch onto any wall or ceiling. The player cannot be harmed while the player uses the hook. The player can also aim their weapons in any direction by holding R2 on the controller. The player can also throw their enemies in any direction, similar to how players Red and Blue can in Gunstar Heroes.

The unique feature in Rapid Reload/Gunners Heaven is the point system. Points are dropped after the player destroys enemies. When the player collects these items, the counter on the top screen rises and eventually will count down. As the player collects more points, their shots from the weapons will become more powerful than the ordinary shots. Occasionally, the player can find a booster item that temporarily increases the player's weapon strength to unbelievable heights, making the player annihilate any enemy easily. Unfortunately, the timer is unforgiving, and the player has a very short time using the booster item.

The game has six stages and during the stages, there is one or two sub-bosses and the one true boss.

== Plot ==
Upon hearing the legend of the treasure known as the Valkiry, treasure hunters Axel Sonics (voiced by Kazuki Yao) and Ruka Hetfield (voiced by Noriko Hidaka) embark on an adventurous quest to find the legendary stone. However, unknown to Axel and Ruka at the start, there is also a terrorist organization known as the Pumpkin Heads searching for the Valkiry, determined to use the stone for world domination.

In a race to reach the stone first, Axel and Ruka fight their way through the Pumpkin Heads' army of elite soldiers along several locations, destroying each of the three top captains and eventually reaching their hideout, where they confront the Master, who already has the Valkiry in her possession. Using the Valkiry to power herself, the Master engages Axel and Ruka in a decisive, final battle, but is eventually destroyed and the Valkiry is freed.

The ending differs for each character: if Axel defeats the Master, he is joined by Ruka, who in her excitement takes the Valkiry and runs off, with the weary Axel only barely managing to keep up with her; if Ruka defeats the Master, she accidentally drops the Valkiry and it shatters, and in her frustration, she vows never to hunt for treasure again, although a caption mentions that she eventually stayed in the business with Axel.

== Release ==
Rapid Reload was released in Europe and Japan but not in North America, reportedly due to Sony Computer Entertainment America's policy against releasing 2D games for the PlayStation.

== Reception ==
Reception

Review scores
Publication	Score
Computer and Video Games	89/100
Edge	6/10
Famitsu	26/40
GamesMaster	78%
Hyper	56/100
Next Generation	4/5
PlayStation Official Magazine – UK	5/10
Play	71%
Coming Soon Magazine	4/5
Dengeki PlayStation	80/100, 80/100, 85/100, 85/100
Games World	72/100
Maximum	2/5
PlayStation Plus	80/100
SonyPro	7/10
Ultimate Future Games	71%
VideoGame Advisor	C

According to Famitsu, Rapid Reload sold 83,942 copies during its lifetime in Japan. The Japanese publication Micom BASIC Magazine ranked the game fifth in popularity in its July 1995 issue. It received an average reception from critics.

Eddy Lawrence and Gary Lord of Computer and Video Games regarded it one of the best "platform blasters", praising its lush backgrounds, soundscapes, and excellent game design, but said it was not as good as Gunstar Heroes. Next Generation felt the game lived up to its title's promise, highlighting the large number of sprites on screen and the lack of flickering and tearing. Maximum described Rapid Reload as a poor Gunstar Heroes clone, pointing out the game's lack of a simultaneous two-player mode and criticized the sloppy PAL conversion.

1Up.com called the game a blatant rip-off of Gunstar Heroes, but nevertheless felt it was overlooked due to the 3D games of the time. IGN considered it a remarkable work that went unnoticed due to "everyone's obsession with polygons" at the time. Kurt Kalata of Hardcore Gaming 101 commended the game's levels and music, but noted its lacking graphical presentation, poorly thought-out weapon system, and lack of a two-player mode. In 2018, Den of Geek identified it as one of the most underrated titles for the PlayStation.
