= Wild Arms 3 =

2002 video game

- North American cover art
- Developer: Media.Vision (Note: Additional work by Sony Computer Entertainment Japan.)
- Publisher: Sony Computer Entertainment: EU: Ubi Soft
- Director: Nobukazu Sato
- Producers: Takashi Fukushima; Yasuhide Kobayashi
- Designer: Akifumi Kaneko
- Programmer: Takao Suzuki
- Artists: Yukihiko Ito; Tetsuya Okubo
- Writer: Akifumi Kaneko
- Composer: Michiko Naruke
- Series: Wild Arms
- Platform: PlayStation 2
- Release: JP: March 14, 2002; NA: October 15, 2002; EU: February 21, 2003
- Genre: Role-playing
- Mode: Single-player

Wild Arms 3, known in Japan as Wild Arms Advanced 3rd (Note: Japanese: ワイルドアームズ アドヴァンスドサード, Hepburn: Wairudo Āmuzu Adovansudo Sādo), is a role-playing video game developed by Media.Vision and published by Sony Computer Entertainment for the PlayStation 2. It is a sequel to Wild Arms and Wild Arms 2. It was released in Japan and North America in 2002 and Europe in 2003 by Ubi Soft. In May 2016 the game was released for PlayStation 4 through PlayStation Network.

The story follows Virginia Maxwell, an amateur Drifter (adventurer) looking for adventure on Filgaia, a desert planet with wild west motifs. After foiling an attempted train robbery of a valuable treasure, Virginia joins forces with three other Drifters as they travel the world and unravel a mysterious plot involving the ancient history of the planet.

== Gameplay ==
Wild Arms 3 is the first game in the Wild Arms series in which all party members are able to use ARMs (magical firearms). It also replaces equippable armor and weapons with Personal Skills via Guardian (Mediums) invocation.

The battle graphics use the same background effects as the previous two games in series, but this time the camera can turn 360 degrees around the battle room and the characters can run while battling. As in the past two games, combat utilizes a turn-based system, but this can be modified on a battle-by-battle basis.

Unlike traditional RPGs, locations on the world map are not immediately visible. In order to discover new towns and dungeons, the player must ask for information or learn of them during the plot and then manually search for them using a GPS-like system. The world map, which the player must buy, assists the players in finding new locations.

== Plot ==
The game takes place on a version of the planet Filgaia from the Wild Arms series, a place that is desolate to the point of even its seas consisting of sand, supposedly the result of an ancient war. Four Drifters find themselves chosen to wield the power of the planet's spiritual protectors, the Guardians, to stop a prophesied but unknown menace to their world. As they adventure together, they are opposed by other Drifter teams, a trio of fanatical scientists called the Prophets, and the Demons of Filgaian legend. The four adventurers eventually make startling discoveries about their world's true history, and their personal connections to it.

=== Characters ===
==== Playable characters ====
- Virginia Maxwell is an 18-year-old Drifter who is searching for her long-lost father, whom she believes to still be alive. It is her life's wish to know and live the Drifter life, as her father did. Her ARMS are two revolvers given to her by her father.
- Jet Enduro is a cold-blooded boy who suffers from amnesia and who lets nothing get in his way. It is learned at Leyline Observatory that Jet's original name was "Adam Kadmon" (which refers to "Primal Man" in Kabbalah), as stated by Werner Maxwell. His ARM is a machine gun; and unknown to Jet, it was designed to be usable only by him. He has a connection to Virginia's father.
- Clive Winslett is a 30-year-old, cool-headed bounty-hunter with a soft spot for his family, consisting of his wife, Katherine, and their young daughter, Kaitlyn. Clive is tormented by an event in his past in which his mentor, Professor Berlitz, was killed during an excursion to delve into the mystery of Filgaia's past. Berlitz sacrificed himself to save Clive, to whom his daughter Katherine was engaged. Clive's ARM is a sniper rifle, which was one of many inventions of his mentor.
- Gallows Carradine is a 24-year-old native of the Baskar tribe seemingly intent on escaping his hometown and his priestly bloodline, by working as a low-rent Drifter bandit. His grandmother, Halle, gives the party hints and direction throughout the game, while disparaging her "useless" grandson. Gallows' younger brother Shane is a dream-seer for the tribe, and his predictions are known to always come true. His latest vision was of a "Blue Menace" who would seek to destroy Filgaia, and was eventually revealed to be Siegfried. His ARM is a sawed-off shotgun and the only of the four main characters' weapons that is never discussed in the plot.

==== Janus' Gang ====
Two teams of Drifters oppose the heroes: one is formed by Janus Cascade, a ruthless but charismatic bandit, and his lackeys, Romero and Dario; Janus later reveals himself to have been working for the Prophets. He is the villain for the first and second parts of the game. The Prophets inject him with Gias, which allows them to keep tabs on him, and punish him for failure via an electric shock. Janus ultimately attempts a not-too-subtle betrayal of the prophets, but it is revealed Janus was intended to be sacrificed by Siegfried, to allow the demon to have a corporeal form.

==== Schrödinger Family ====
The other Drifter team is composed of Maya Schrödinger, her brother Alfred, their stylish afro-ed bodyguard, Todd Dukakis, and a mysterious cat named Shady. Maya feels a rivalry with Virginia, and both helps and hinders Virginia at times. Maya has a unique ability among Filgaians to absorb information from books and to use it to improve battle techniques, hence her Calamity Jane persona. She also appears as a witch and martial artist as well. Alfred is an explosives expert who always uses his trademark bombs. Todd eschews firepower in favor of a sword, the Black Fenrir, used by Jack Van Burace of the original Wild Arms, as well as a few of Jack's techniques. Todd mentions having learned "Flash Draw", or iaido, techniques from Maya and Alfred's father, whom Todd repays by protecting his children after he dies. Shady was apparently summoned by a Schrödinger of a previous generation, and subsequently locked in a box for some reason. Maya found it in her family's estate and released him, earning his loyalty. It is never explained what exactly Shady is, besides "Cat", in the game, but it is a likely reference to Schrödinger's cat.

==== Prophets ====
The Prophets are a trio of scientists: Leehalt Alcaste, Melody Vilente, and Malik Bendict, who are obsessed with restoring Filgaia's decaying environment, but they do not care who suffers as a result. Each also has a personal agenda: Leehalt wants to rule, Melody wants to retain her beauty, and Malik wants to resurrect his dead mother. Following the advent of Siegfried, the trio gain more demonic forms. They are villains for the second and third parts of the game, and each demonstrates the ability to summon monsters at will, often resulting in a boss-battle for the heroes.

A golem named Asgard is made by the prophets. He eventually gains feelings and personality, due to being programmed to absorb data from every battle. His name is a reference to the "Earth Golem" of the first Wild Arms, as its name was Asgard in the Japanese version, and the PS2 remake, Alter Code: F.

==== Lombardia ====
The mythical dragon Lombardia allies herself with the party after they decide to look into acquiring aerial transportation. She joins them under the condition that she will be able to fight once again, and quench her thirst for battle. Lombardia's transformation into a jet-like form has likened her to that of the Transformers robots.

==== Demons ====
The Metal Demon Zeikfried from the first Wild Arms game returns, though his name is respelt Siegfried. He is the villain for the third part of the game, after he is revived by the Prophets at the Yggdrasil facility. He is also referred to as the "Blue Menace" of Shane's dreams. He acquires the three shields collected by Janus earlier, "Andro", "Crio", and "Hieraco", and applies their power to the prophets, making himself three new demon followers, akin to Alhazad, Harken, and Belselk of the first game.

A Dream Demon named Beatrice appears near the end of the game, and is the villain for the final part of the game. Contrary to the way she apparently shows up out of nowhere, she can be encountered as a random NPC in some of the game's towns, but can't be addressed, as she will be gone if the party reaches where she is. Beatrice ultimately reveals herself to be playing the role of the great manipulator, as every major event in the game can somehow be attributed to her. She is responsible for Shane's "dream sight", as well as for guiding Lamium, the chairman of the members at the Ark of Destiny. She had used members of the Council of Seven to attempt to sabotage the Yggdrasil, and create her Filgaia, ten years prior, which led to the defoliation of the planet, after which she removed everyone's memory of the event. Her ultimate goal is to build a "new Filgaia", and propagate a new lineage of demons there. Strangely, after she is defeated at the end of the game, her voice is still heard, hinting that she may not be through with Filgaia after all.

While never alluded to outside of a few books in the game, and never affecting the plot, Wild Arms series' staple optional boss, Ragu O Ragla, appears once again as the ultimate boss of the Abyss optional dungeon. He is described as the King of the Monsters and as so terrible that he was sealed in the depths of the Abyss, so he would never return to savage Filgaia. He is fought in two battles in this game, once at floor 100 of The Abyss, and once again, stronger, when he blocks the parties' exit from the area back on the first floor.

==== Council of Seven ====
The game continually makes references to a group called the Council of Seven, a team of scientists who, ten years prior to the start of the game, were conducting experiments to restore the pulse of life to Filgaia in a facility known as the Yggdrasil. The experiment went awry and did the exact opposite, sucking most of the remaining life from the planet, leaving most of it an expansive desert. Notable members of this group are each of the Three Prophets, as well as Virginia's father, Werner Maxwell. Rounding out the group are Jet's adoptive father/creator, Elliot Enduro, as well as Pete Inkapilia, and Duran Bryant, about whom little is revealed, but their notes detail that they were repeatedly visited by Beatrice in dreams. Virginia's mother, Ekatrina, was also working with the Council at some point in the past.

== Development and release ==
The game's introduction and event animations were produced by Bee Train Production Inc. with P.A. Works, directed by Koichi Mashimo with Kazuya Tsurumaki.

The game was re-released for the PlayStation 4 via PSN on May 17, 2016, which includes improved resolutions and trophies.

== Reception ==
Reception

Aggregate score
Aggregator	Score
Metacritic	78/100

Review scores
Publication	Score
Electronic Gaming Monthly	8/10
Eurogamer	7/10
Famitsu	32/40
Game Informer	7.75/10
GamePro	4/5
GameRevolution	B
GameSpot	7.5/10
GameSpy	4.5/5
GameZone	8.5/10
IGN	7.9/10
Official U.S. PlayStation Magazine	3.5/5
RPGamer	8/10
RPGFan	(J.T.) 90% (R.B.) 87%
X-Play	3/5

Wild Arms 3 received "generally favorable reviews" according to the review aggregation website Metacritic. Critics praised the cel-shaded graphics along with the deep story and characters, while criticizing the frequent battles and world map searching system. In Japan, Famitsu gave it a score of 32 out of 40.

During the 6th Annual Interactive Achievement Awards, Wild Arms 3 received a nomination for "Console Role-Playing Game of the Year" by the Academy of Interactive Arts & Sciences.
