= Media.Vision =

Japanese video game developer

- Native name: メディア・ビジョン株式会社
- Type: Public company
- Industry: Video games
- Founded: March 1, 1993
- Headquarters: Tokyo, Japan
- Products: Wild Arms
- Number of employees: 124 (2026)
- Website: Official website

Media.Vision (メディア・ビジョン株式会社, Media Bijon Kabushiki-Gaisha) is a Japanese video game developer best known for the Wild Arms and Chaos Rings series of role-playing video games. They were one of the first companies developing games for the PlayStation and enjoyed a close relationship with Japan Studio in their early years.

== History ==
The company was founded in 1993 by former members of Riot, a subsidiary of Telenet Japan responsible for developing the Tenshi no Uta series for PC Engine.

== Games developed ==
Year	Title	Publisher(s)
1994	Crime Crackers	Sony Computer Entertainment
1995	Rapid Reload	Sony Computer Entertainment
1996	Wild Arms	Sony Computer Entertainment
1997	Crime Crackers 2	Sony Computer Entertainment
1999	Wild Arms 2	Sony Computer Entertainment
2002	Sneakers	Microsoft Game Studios
2002	Wild Arms 3	Sony Computer Entertainment
2003	Wild Arms Alter Code: F	Sony Computer Entertainment
2005	Wild Arms 4	Sony Computer Entertainment
2005	Heavy Metal Thunder	Square Enix
2005	Mawaza	Sony Computer Entertainment
2006	Wild Arms 5	Sony Computer Entertainment
2007	Wild Arms XF	Sony Computer Entertainment
2008	The Wizard of Oz: Beyond the Yellow Brick Road	D3 Publisher
2009	Enkaku Sōsa: Shinjitsu e no 23 Nichikan	Sony Computer Entertainment
2009	Dragon Ball: Revenge of King Piccolo	Namco Bandai Games
2010	Chaos Rings	Square Enix
2011	Valkyria Chronicles III	Sega
2011	Chaos Rings Omega	Square Enix
2012	Chaos Rings II	Square Enix
2012	Shining Blade	Sega
2013	Shining Ark	Sega
2014	Chaos Rings III	Square Enix
2014	Shining Resonance	Sega
2015	Digimon Story: Cyber Sleuth	Bandai Namco Entertainment
2016	Valkyria Chronicles Remastered	Sega
2016	Summon Night 6	Bandai Namco Entertainment
2017	Valkyria Revolution	Sega
2017	Digimon Story: Cyber Sleuth – Hacker's Memory	Bandai Namco Entertainment
2018	Valkyria Chronicles 4	Sega
2025	The Hundred Line: Last Defense Academy	Aniplex
2025	Digimon Story: Time Stranger	Bandai Namco Entertainment
