= Wild Arms 4 =

2005 video game

- North American cover art
- Developer: Media.Vision (Note: Additional work by Sony Computer Entertainment Japan.)
- Publishers: JP: Sony Computer Entertainment; NA: Xseed Games; PAL: 505 Game Street
- Director: Nobukazu Satō
- Producers: Takashi Fukushima; Yasuhide Kobayashi
- Designer: Akifumi Kaneko
- Programmer: Takao Suzuki
- Artists: Tetsuya Ōkubo; Yukihiko Itō
- Writer: Akifumi Kaneko
- Composers: Michiko Naruke; Masato Kouda; Nobuyuki Shimizu; Ryuta Suzuki
- Series: Wild Arms
- Platform: PlayStation 2
- Release: JP: March 24, 2005; NA: January 10, 2006; EU: October 13, 2006; AU: October 26, 2006
- Genre: Role-playing
- Mode: Single-player

Wild Arms 4, known in Japan as Wild Arms the 4th Detonator (Note: Japanese: ワイルドアームズ ザ フォースデトネイター, Hepburn: Wairudo Āmuzu Za Fōsu Detoneitā), is a role-playing video game developed by Media.Vision and published by Sony Computer Entertainment for the PlayStation 2. It is the fourth installment in the Wild Arms video game series. It was released in March 2005 in Japan, January 2006 in North America by Xseed Games and PAL territories in 2006 by 505 Game Street.

The game's overall look and feel is a departure from the Wild West feel of Wild Arms 3 to a more modern look. The game was originally announced alongside Wild Arms Alter Code: F under the title Wild Arms Another Code: F before being renamed.

== Story ==
Jude Maverick has grown up in an isolated town called Ciel, which is completely enclosed in a large sphere floating thousands of feet above the surface of Filgaia. His sheltered world changes forever when he sees the sky "tear" and ships enter his homeland. Upon inspecting the campsite set up by the intruders, he sees something else that he has never seen before: a girl.

The girl's name is Yulie Ahtreide and she is being held captive by the intruders after being captured by a "Drifter" for hire, Arnaud G. Vasquez. After the invading army attacks Ciel and brings the sphere crashing down, Jude, Yulie and Arnaud join forces to find the army's true intention behind Yulie's abduction. With the help of another Drifter, Raquel Applegate, these four idealistic teens travel the war-torn land of Filgaia in search of truth, their own identities, and their separate paths to adulthood.

== Gameplay ==
The HEX battle system is composed of seven hexagons on the battle field, with random beginning placement for all characters and enemies. The HEX battle system is area based; any attacks or spells given to certain hexagon, or HEX, will affect all characters on that HEX. Multiple allies or enemies can occupy a single HEX, but enemies and allies cannot occupy the same HEX.

== Localization ==
In the North American version, two monsters (Dalawa Bunny and Accident Rabbit) were taken out of the game, but not out of the monsters list, making it impossible to finish the game with 100% completion. The PAL version still contains this error, and is also known to crash in certain places when played in 50 Hz mode, leaving those areas potentially impassable to players whose television does not support 60 Hz PAL signals.

Some PAL copies also have another issue where triggering specific Material summons would freeze the game. A workaround is to disable the battle movies in the game's options. This bug affects both PAL and NTSC modes.

The English localization copy is known to freeze when loading the area at the top of a ladder at "The Great Wall" roughly 5 hours into the game when played in PAL mode. A workaround can be achieved by saving the game in the area prior and loading the game in NTSC mode, going past and saving on the world map. No other areas are known to have this problem.

== Reception ==
Reception

Aggregate score
Aggregator	Score
Metacritic	69/100

Review scores
Publication	Score
Computer Games Magazine	3.5/5
Electronic Gaming Monthly	7/10 (Note: Three critics of Electronic Gaming Monthly gave the game each a score of 8/10, 7/10, and 6/10.)
Eurogamer	4/10
Famitsu	32/40
Game Informer	7.5/10
GameRevolution	C
GameSpot	7.8/10
GameSpy	3.5/5
GameZone	7.8/10
IGN	7.8/10
Official U.S. PlayStation Magazine	1.5/5
RPGamer	3.5/5
RPGFan	90%

The game received "average" reviews according to the review aggregation website Metacritic. In Japan, Famitsu gave it a score of 32 out of 40.
