= Michiko Naruke =

Japanese video game music composer (born 1967)

Michiko Naruke 成毛美智子 (なるけ みちこ)
- Born: August 13, 1967 (age 58); Chiba Prefecture, Japan
- Origin: Japan
- Genres: Video game music
- Occupation: Composer
- Instrument: Keyboards
- Years active: 1990–present
- Labels: SPE Visual Works, King
- Website: Sasakure.net

Michiko Naruke (なるけ みちこ, Naruke Michiko) (born August 13, 1967) is a Japanese video game music composer, well known for her work in the Wild Arms series.

== Composing career ==
She used to work for Telenet Japan and Riot, but many people who worked for these two companies left, and along with Naruke, later started working for Media.Vision. She has composed music for games outside of the Wild ARMs series, such as Psycho Dream on the Super Famicom and the Tenshi no Uta series on the PC Engine. While it was speculated that Naruke composed under the pseudonym "Hassy" for the @MIDI albums, the composer herself has stated that Hassy is a separate individual (Hiroya Hatsushiba).

She has made a number of songs for Media.Vision's Wild ARMs series. Occasionally, the main theme and ending theme of the Wild ARMs songs will contain lyrics, formerly being sung by Machiko Watanabe and Kaori Asoh. Most recently, for the tenth anniversary, a new vocalist has been introduced, Nana Mizuki. Her compositions in the Wild ARMs series include her signature whistling parts, whistled by Naoki Takao. Naruke has composed more than 400 songs for the Wild ARMs series. However, during the development of Wild ARMs: The 4th Detonator, Naruke fell ill, marking the first time in the Wild ARMs series that she did not compose the entire soundtrack.

In an interview for Wild ARMs: Piece of Tears, Naruke revealed items which she values, including her keyboard and rhythm machine, a pamphlet of Jerry Goldsmith, a figure of Kurokishi from "Gingaman", an original score of Bach, and a memorial vinyl disc.

== Works ==
=== Video games ===
Year	Title	Role
1990	Legion	Music with Hiroto Otsubo, Shinobu Ogawa, and Takaharu Umezu
1990	Dekoboko Densetsu: Hashiru Wagamanma	arrangement with Hiroto Otsubo, Minoru Yuasa, and Shingo Murakami
1991	Valis III (Mega Drive)	arrangement with Takaharu Umezu and Minoru Yuasa
1991	High Grenadier	Music with Takaharu Umezu
1991	Tenshi no Uta	Music with Shinobu Ogawa
1992	Mirai Shounen Conan	Music
1992	Psycho Dream	Music
1993	Tenshi no Uta II: Datenshi no Sentaku	Music
1996	Wild Arms	Music
1999	Wild Arms 2	Music
2002	Wild Arms 3	Music
2003	Wild Arms Alter Code: F	Music
2005	Wild Arms 4	Music with Masato Kouda, Nobuyuki Shimizu, and Ryuta Suzuki
2008	Super Smash Bros. Brawl	Arrangements (Note: "Ocarina of Time Medley" and "Bramble Blast")
2008	The Wizard of Oz: Beyond the Yellow Brick Road	"RIZ-ZOAWD!", "My Home on the Hills"
2010	Guwange	Arrangement (Note: "Departure (Select)")
2011	Noora to Toki no Koubou: Kiri no Mori no Majo	Music
2011	Half-Minute Hero: The Second Coming	"To a Space Faraway", "Battle of Godwave"
2014	Super Smash Bros. for Nintendo 3DS and Wii U	Arrangements (Note: "Full Steam Ahead (Spirit Tracks)", and "Cut Man Stage")
2015	Zombie Tokyo	Music with Noriyuki Iwadare
2016	7'scarlet	"Koboresou na Tsuki"
2016	Atelier Firis: The Alchemist and the Mysterious Journey	"Beyond the Tempest"
2018	Super Smash Bros. Ultimate	Arrangements (Note: “Bloody Tears/Monster Dance”, "Mad Monster Mansion", and "Let's Go to Seoul! (Fatal Fury 2)")
2018	Wild Arms: Million Memories	Music with Saki Furuya, Naoki Chiba, and Kyohei Ozawa
2019	Rakugaki Kingdom	"Regaining"
2024	Eiyuden Chronicle: Hundred Heroes	Music with Motoi Sakuraba
2025	Armed Fantasia	Music with Noriyasu Agematsu

=== Other ===
Year	Title	Role
2006	FM Sound Module Maniax	Music with several others
2009	Griotte no Nemuri Hime ~FEL ARY LU EN TINDHARIA~	Music with several others
2013	Feedback	Music
2013	Feedback 2nd	Music
2013	Feedback 3rd	Music
2013	Feedback 4th	Music
2014	Game Music Prayer II	Music with several others
2014	THE LEGEND ARTISTS Otakara Hakken!	Music with several others
2014	Feedback 5th.	Music
2014	Feedback 6th.	Music
