= Tenshi no Uta =

Role-playing video game series

- Cover art of the third game, Tenshi no Uta: Shiroki Tsubasa no Inori
- Genre: Role-playing video game
- Developer: Telenet Japan
- Publisher: Telenet Japan
- Creators: Kenichi Nishi; Akifumi Kaneko
- Artists: Hiroshi Fuji; Nobuteru Yūki
- Composers: Michiko Naruke; Motoi Sakuraba; Shinji Tamura; Hiroya Hatsushiba
- Platforms: TurboGrafx-16 Super CD-ROM², Super NES
- First release: Tenshi No Uta; 25 October 1991
- Latest release: Tenshi no Uta: Shiroki Tsubasa no Inori; July 29, 1994

Tenshi no Uta is a role-playing video game series developed and published by Telenet Japan. The series has a motif of Celtic mythology and consists of three games: Tenshi no Uta (1991), Tenshi no Uta II: Datenshi no Sentaku (1993), and Tenshi no Uta: Shiroki Tsubasa no Inori (1994).

== Games ==
=== Tenshi no Uta ===
Tenshi no Uta (天使の詩) was released on 25 October 1991 as one of the launch titles for the PC Engine Super CD-ROM².

=== Tenshi no Uta II: Datenshi no Sentaku ===
Tenshi no Uta II: Datenshi no Sentaku (天使の詩II 堕天使の選択; lit. "- Choices of the Fallen Angel") was released on 26 March 1993, also for the Super CD-ROM². The game is set in a 100-year-after parallel universe of its predecessor. Characters were designed by Nobuteru Yūki.

=== Tenshi no Uta: Shiroki Tsubasa no Inori ===
Tenshi no Uta: Shiroki Tsubasa no Inori (天使の詩 〜白き翼の祈り〜; lit. "- Prayer of the White Wings") was published for the Super Famicom on July 29, 1994. It is the third episode in the series, but is not a true sequel to the first and second episodes previously released on the PC Engine.

Members of Wolfteam were involved with this project. It was the first time that Wolfteam members worked with many workers getting transferred from the Riot subsidiary. Music and sound design were provided by Motoi Sakuraba, Shinji Tamura, and Hiroya Hatsushiba. An English fan translation was released in 2018.

== Release ==
Tenshi no Uta: The Angel Verse Collection, which includes the two Tenchi no Uta games for the PC Engine, was released by Edia in 12 September 2024. It was released in English in 2026.
