= Wild Arms (video game) =

1996 role-playing video game

- North American cover art featuring the three protagonists Rudy, Cecilia, and Jack
- Developer: Media.Vision (Note: Sony Computer Entertainment Japan assisted on development.)
- Publisher: Sony Computer Entertainment
- Producer: Takashi Fukushima
- Designer: Akifumi Kaneko
- Writer: Akifumi Kaneko
- Composer: Michiko Naruke
- Series: Wild Arms
- Platform: PlayStation
- Release: JP: December 20, 1996; NA: April 30, 1997; EU: October 1998
- Genre: Role-playing
- Mode: Single-player

Wild Arms (Note: Japanese: ワイルドアームズ, Hepburn: Wairudo āmuzu) is a role-playing video game developed by Media.Vision and published by Sony Computer Entertainment for the PlayStation. The game was released in Japan in 1996, in North America in 1997, and in Europe in 1998. It utilizes 2D computer graphics for navigating the world and setting, while battle sequences are rendered in 3D.

Wild Arms takes place in the world of Filgaia, a setting which blends both fantasy and Western genres. In Filgaia, bands of miscreants and adventurers called Dream Chasers scour the world in search of excitement and fortune. The player assumes control of a party of three such adventurers. Rudy can operate powerful weapons called Ancient Relic Machines (ARMs), forbidden remnants of a lost age that resemble firearms; Jack is a wandering swordsman struggling with a past failure; and Cecilia is a princess with the power to communicate with Guardians, powerful spirits of Filgaia. The group must use their respective skills to navigate through the wastelands and dungeons of Filgaia, and prevent an otherworldly threat from reviving their lost leader and destroying the world.

Despite its release being somewhat overshadowed by the hype for the upcoming Final Fantasy VII, Wild Arms was a critical and commercial success. There were relatively few RPGs available for the PlayStation in the North American market at the time, giving Wild Arms a clear field. In November 2003, an enhanced remake titled Wild Arms Alter Code: F was released for the PlayStation 2 in Japan, with a North American version released in November 2005. Alter Code: F features a new graphical style, an expanded script, a remastered soundtrack, more playable characters, and additional gameplay scenarios.

== Gameplay ==

Top: A town, rendered with 2D sprites.
Bottom: A battle, rendered in 3D. In the early era of the PlayStation, 3D graphics were considered a major differentiator for the console.

Wild Arms is a role-playing video game. The player controls the party of three characters, Rudy, Jack, and Cecilia, as they explore the world of Filgaia, navigate its environments, battle enemies, and solve puzzles. The game is presented in a top-down two-dimensional fashion where the player has an overhead view of all the action taking place on a particular screen. As the game's story progresses, the player navigates through various dangerous areas filled with randomly appearing enemies, as well as set-piece boss encounters. Characters progress and grow more powerful by gaining experience points after a battle, finding ARMs (Rudy), discovering crest graphs used for magic spells (Cecilia), and mastering sword techniques prompted by various events in the game (Jack). Players can also find and purchase a variety of equipment, including weapons, armor, and consumable single-use items.

While exploring dungeons, various situations will block progress until they are solved, essentially serving as puzzles. The party finds a variety of devices called "Tools," unique to each character, which are used to solve these puzzles and continue onward. Rudy's bomb tool, for example, can demolish large rocks and other impediments, while Jack's grappling hook allows the party to cross large gaps and chasms while avoiding traps.

=== Battle system ===
Combat is rendered in 3D graphics. Wild Arms employs a turn-based battle system, where the player inputs commands at the start of each round for each character. The order in which each character and enemy performs these actions is based on their "response" (RES) statistic, which denotes how quickly a particular character can act. Actions include attacking with their equipped weapon, performing unique skills, using items from their inventory, and fleeing from the combat. Enemy units are defeated when their hit points, a numerical representation of their vitality, reach zero.

Each of the three playable characters has a unique set of abilities that can be used to defeat enemies or aid party members. Rudy utilizes "ARMs", powerful attacks involving gun-like weapons, but that deplete a limited ammunition supply. Jack's "Fast Draw" sword techniques can damage opponents in various ways. Cecilia's magic has a variety of effects, including restoring hit points to the party, raising or lowering statistics, and damaging enemies with harmful spells. Additionally, a character can equip special items called "runes," allowing them to summon powerful Guardians to aid them in battle. New ARMs, Fast Draws, and magic spells can be acquired as the main story progresses.

During combat, each character has a "Force Bar" that grows through battle actions such as attacking, dodging, or receiving damage. Characters can spend this accumulated meter on powerful "Force Techniques". Each character eventually gets access to four such techniques. For example, Cecilia's "Mystic" ability allows an item to be used to cast a spell, while Jack's "Accelerator" lets him get a guaranteed first action in the combat round with a slight damage boost. More powerful skills cost more of the Force Bar.

Like normal equipment, Runes can be equipped that improve a character's statistics. Equipping these Runes has the added benefit of allowing a character to summon powerful magic creatures known as Guardians. These effects include attacking all enemies at once or aiding allies with beneficial magic. New runes can be obtained through both dungeon exploration and in certain story events. Most Guardian attacks, like Cecilia's magic, have an elemental designation that is more effective against certain enemies.

== Plot ==
=== Setting ===
Wild Arms takes place in the world of Filgaia, a fantasy world. The technology of the world varies greatly, with some areas resembling medieval Europe, featuring cloistered monasteries and castles, while other areas resemble a frontier loosely akin to the American West. Advancements such as motors are found sporadically. Much of the technology is remnants recovered from the distant past by archaeologists and engineers who refashion it for the present day. Destructive technology such as ARMs (firearms) is seen as a dangerous and therefore forbidden technology that is feared by the general populace.

A thousand years before the main events of Wild Arms, a great war engulfed Filgaia between its original inhabitants, the humans and Elw, and an invading race called the Metal Demons. The Metal Demons had lost their own homeworld and sought to make Filgaia their new home. During the conflict, powerful weapons were developed, including mechanical golems and artificial warriors known as Holmcrosses, which combined metal and flesh. The humans eventually captured the demon's leader, "Mother," and sealed her within a castle in the tundra of Arctica. However, they were unable to destroy her regenerating body completely. With the aid of the Guardians, the protectors of Filgaia, she was imprisoned within a cocoon. Her heart was removed and torn into three pieces, and the pieces of her heart were placed inside three stone statues which were scattered across the world. The war came to an end, with the majority of the Metal Demons remaining either in seclusion or in their dimension. However, the conflict had devastated the surface of Filgaia, creating wastelands and leaving scars which still have not yet recovered in the present. (Note: Zeikfried: It's been 1000 years since we came here. The loss of our home world, Hiades... We came to this planet to make it our home... Power rules all. This place will belong to us. (Wild Arms))

If the title screen is left idle, an introductory scene plays depicting the more recent past. A group of metal demons invade Arctica Castle, kills the inhabitants, and reclaims the inert cocoon of Mother. The only seeming human survivors are two Fenril Knights of Arctica, Garret and Elmina, with Garret escaping. (Note: Ryan: 'A surprise attack within the snowstorm... Maybe they're after... Chief Coldbird, maybe the demons are after the cocoon?' Alhazad: '... I don't have much time, so let me get to the point... All right? Will you give me that thing you call a cocoon?')

=== Characters ===
Wild Arms features three playable characters, each with a brief introduction at the start of the game.

- Rudy Roughnight (ロディ・ラグナイト Rodi Ragunaito; "Roughknight" in Alter Code: F) is a 15-year-old boy from a remote village who was orphaned several years prior to the start of the game when his grandfather died. Under the care of the town's mayor, Rudy worked as a farmhand for his neighbor. In his prologue, Rudy finds and rescues a local boy lost in a cave just outside town, yet inadvertently frees a zombie sealed within the cavern. He defeats the zombie and saves the village but alerts the villagers to his forbidden ARM weapon in the process, causing him to be cast out of the village. (Note: Townsperson: I know about you. You possess the ARM. The forbidden power! I know I shouldn't have, but I looked through your stuff the other day. The ARM has brought doom upon us all! (Wild Arms)) He is forced into the life of an adventurer and Dream Chaser. Rudy is a silent protagonist, though he does have one line in the game.
- Jack Van Burace (ザック・ヴァン・ブレイス Zakku Van Bureisu) is a treasure hunter and swordsman-for-hire who is searching the world for the "ultimate power" that will allow him to confront his troubled past. In his prologue, Jack discovers an ancient holographic device within the Memory Temple bearing a warning from the lost race of the Elw, who had developed advanced technology. He sets off to the town of Adlehyde to find more information that will point him in the direction of his goal. Jack is accompanied by 'Hanpan,' a "wind mouse" that speaks and understands the human language and often acts as Jack's moral compass.
- Cecilia Lynn Adlehyde (セシリア・レイン・アーデルハイド Seshiria Rein Aderuhaido) is a young princess who has spent most of her life studying at the Curan Abbey magic school. Her 17th birthday at the beginning of the game marks her official ascension into the Adlehyde royal family and departure from the school. Before she leaves, however, she is contacted by a mysterious voice who beckons her to a hidden library deep within the abbey. There she confronts and defeats a demon using her fledgling magic skills, and frees a powerful entity known as a Guardian from a sealed book. The Guardian informs Cecilia that her royal blood allows her to be a medium between the real world and the spirit dimension occupied by the avatars of all the world's elemental forces, and that she will be instrumental in securing the future and reconstruction of the barren planet.

There are also various supporting characters and villains. Supporting characters include the scientist and golem-enthusiast Emma; Jane Maxwell, another wielder of ARMs like Rudy; and the sole remaining Elw in Filgaia, Mariel. The main antagonist group is the Quarter Knights, dedicated to the Metal Demon's cause: their leader Zeikfried, the scientist and magician Alhazad, the warrior Belselk, and the swordswoman Lady Harken. Belselk is later replaced by the demon Boomerang, accompanied by the Guardian Lucied. They are on a quest to revive Mother and reclaim a new homeland for the Metal Demons by re-igniting the war that occurred 1,000 years earlier.

=== Story ===
The player can choose to play through Rudy, Jack, or Cecilia's prologues in any order. After their prologues, the trio independently makes their way to the city of Adlehyde, where they meet. They help a local engineer, Emma, who is researching ancient technology and believes a remnant of the ancient wars may be inside a nearby tomb. They discover a deactivated robotic creature, a golem. The three adventurers escort Emma and their discovery back to Adlehyde to exhibit it at the town's Ruin Festival. (Note: Emma:Yes, this is Lolithia. One of the eight golems. Isn't it cute? This thing is unbreakable. It's still in mint condition and it's completely dormant. (Wild Arms)) During the festival, an army of demons led by Belselk of the Quarter Knights attacks Adelhyde, burns the town, and steals the golems. In the fighting, Cecilia's father is mortally wounded. To spare the remaining people of Adlehyde, Cecilia gives Belselk her family heirloom, a pendant called the Tear Drop that has magical properties which can be used as a catalyst for reviving the demon's leader Mother. (Note: Cecilia: What do the demons want with the Tear Drop? Do they want to destroy the world with it? Gurdijeff: With the Tear Drop, it is possible. The demons are trying to use it to revive their master, the Mother. (Wild Arms)) The invaders leave, but Rudy, Jack, and Cecilia decide to oppose the demons and restore the weakening balance of Filgaia's elemental forces. Cecilia cuts off her long hair to symbolize breaking with her royal origin.

Traveling across Filgaia, the heroes make their way to the abandoned Guardian Temple to gain the aid of the mystical Guardians who maintain the forces of nature. (Note: Gurdijeff: Because you are weak, you seek power... We shall give you the power that you seek, but time is running out. You will have the power to summon us into your reality. Take our powers before they weaken any further and stop the demons from regenerating the Mother. We shall send our warriors to their lair. (Wild Arms)) The Guardians inform the party that the demon's leader, "Mother," has been sealed away by three scattered statues that lie across Filgaia. (Note: Baskar Chief: During the war 1000 years ago, the Demon Queen's heart was torn into three pieces and sealed in three separate Guardian Statues. They are planning an all out attack after the revival of their Queen. (Wild Arms)) Utilizing ancient Elw technology in the form of teleportation devices, the group travels the world to stop the Quarter Knights from destroying the statues, but they fail in each attempt. The resurrection of Mother occurs, yet the Quarter Knight Zeikfried discovers that her intentions are not what he expected. Rather than conquer Filgaia for the Metal Demons, she intends to eradicate it. Mother reveals that she was the one who destroyed the old home of the Metal Demons when Zeikfried was only a child and tells the Quarter Knights that their deaths will follow soon after. (Note: Mother: Rule? Order? What do those things have to do with me! Filgaia will end up just like the other worlds I've been to. The flame of life is the most beautiful at its scattering end... The end of a planet is the ultimate beauty supplied by the universe. (Wild Arms))

The heroes decide to attack the demons' stronghold, the Photosphere. Rudy, Jack, and Cecilia gather the necessary materials to enter the tomb of the last remaining golem, the Earth Golem, Asgard. Convincing him to aid them in their struggle, (Note: Cecilia: No! It's not our weapon! It's joining us as a member of the group ... Please lend me your big hand for the future! A future where you're no longer needed as a weapon. (Wild Arms)) Asgard neutralizes the protective seal around the Photosphere, granting the team access. With the aid of a blue-hooded figure, the heroes reacquire Cecilia's Tear Drop, which had previously served as the power source to the entire fortress. They attack the weakened Mother, destroying her body as the Photosphere sinks into the ocean. Thinking the worst was over, the trio departed for Adlehyde, where the Quarter Knights confronted them. The blue-hooded character who assisted them is revealed to be Ziekfried, who had betrayed the megalomaniacal and insane Mother. However, the Quarter Knights still plan to conquer Filgaia, as initially intended. (Note: Emma: From what I've heard, it sounds like the enemy is stepping up their plans... The total annihilation of all life on Filgaia and the complete destruction of the Guardians' powers... (Wild Arms))

The demons attempt to destroy the "Ray Line" underneath Filgaia that connects the Guardians and the planet. These plans are temporarily thwarted when Zeikfried is thrown through a dimensional rift during the confrontation with the three. Finding himself transported to the underwater wreckage of the Photosphere, Zeikfred is met by a deformed visage of Mother, who devours him. (Note: Zeikfried: No way... I'm back on the control chair of the Photosphere! ... That was close. I thought I was going to be lost in another dimension. Although, it's ironic that I'm back at this place of hatred. The hatred between a child and a parent. (Wild Arms)) The remaining Quarter Knights find another way to disrupt the Ray Line by creating their own imitation destructive Tear Drop. They use the Elw teleportation system to distribute it over Filgaia, throwing the forces of nature into chaos.

In the resulting conflicts, both Rudy and Jack's backstories are revealed. Rudy has to sever his own arm in the conflict with Zeikfried (by sword in Wild Arms, and by gun in Alter Code: F). With his inhuman interior revealed, Rudy is shown as a Holmcross, an artificial being designed as a weapon that shares the same basic physiology as the Metal Demons. These beings were largely discarded and destroyed after the ancient war as violent threats nearly as dangerous as the Metal Demons they fought against. Rudy's adoptive grandfather, Zepet, gave Rudy a gentle upbringing and the capacity to care and love, steering him away from being a weapon of destruction like his brethren. Jack is revealed to have originally been Garret, a knight of the fallen castle of Arctica. Lady Harken of the Quarter Knights is his old friend and colleague Elmina, since transformed into a servant of the Metal Demons by Alhazad's experiments.

The Metal Demons find the tower of Ka Dingel and raise it to skyward to connect with Malduke, an ancient giant structure on one of the moons orbiting the planet. Rudy, Jack, and Cecilia confront what remains of their adversaries before reaching the teleportation device to take them to Malduke. There they confront Zeikfried, who has become possessed by Mother, and defeat the combined being. (Note: Motherfried: Even if my flesh is destroyed, I will always have a home at the end of time... Filgaia will not be able to escape the darkness that is upon it... Nothing can stop the end from arriving... (Wild Arms)) It still seems too late to stop Malduke's superweapon from destroying Filgaia, but the Guardians are able to pool their strength and revive the world. Rudy, Jack, and Cecilia board the teleportation device to be transported back home but are stopped mid-voyage by Zeikfried. The weakened Zeikfried launches a last desperate assault but is finally defeated. (Note: Zeik Tuvai: As I said before, battle in artificial space is very risky. Our previous battle was nothing compared to this. We will all be blown away! (Wild Arms)) Narrowly escaping through the destabilized portal to Filgaia, the Earth Golem Asgard shields the trio from a collapsing Ka Dingel. Asgard sustains great damage and is allowed to sleep once more beneath the earth with Cecilia's help. Cecilia prepares to live in Adlehyde to fulfill her duties as ruler. She soon leaves leadership responsibilities to others and joins Jack and Rudy on a new journey. (Note: Cecilia: Am I not supposed to be here? I'm delivering to you, the item that you forgot. (Wild Arms))

== Development ==
Wild Arms was developed by Japanese software company Media.Vision. The studio was founded in 1993 by several members of Telenet Japan who had left the Riot division after working on the RPG series Tenshi no Uta for the NEC PC Engine. The idea for the game had been around for some time; it may have been originally intended for the Super Famicom (SFC / SNES) in its earliest stages before plans changed and it became a Sony PlayStation (PSX) game. The game took about 3 years to create and was driven largely by a team of just 10 or so employees, including producer Takashi Fukushima, game designer Akifumi Kaneko, and character designer Yoshihiko Ito. Kaneko later remarked that Sony, the publisher, was largely hands-off and let Media.Vision pursues their concept without meddling or rushing them. Sony's "Japan Studio" team assisted a bit with development. The game was released in Japan in late 1996.

Wild Arms' soundtrack was composed by Michiko Naruke. It is heavily inspired by Spaghetti Westerns, featuring instrumentation from mandolins, acoustic and electric guitars, finger cymbals, trumpets, and whistling. A classical theme is also present in many tracks, with the melody provided by string instruments and deep drums to heighten the mood or increase tension. The game's overworld theme "Lone Bird in the Shire" contains the melody from Ennio Morricone's "The Ecstasy of Gold", originally from The Good, the Bad, and the Ugly. "Into the Wilderness" contains parts from Riz Ortolani's soundtrack to Day of Anger.

The opening video sequence to Wild Arms was created by Japanese animation studio Madhouse, with the accompanying music track "Into the Wilderness" composed by Naruke. The song was arranged by Kazuhiko Toyama and features whistling by Naoki Takao.

== Release ==
While RPGs were common in the Japanese market, the American branch of Sony Computer Entertainment generally discouraged RPGs from being released in the North American market. (Note: Previous RPGs released for the PlayStation in the U.S. include Beyond the Beyond, Vandal Hearts, Tecmo's Deception, and Revelations: Persona.) This policy was only reversed in 1996, with Wild Arms one of the first games to benefit from this, resulting in it having a relatively open market in North America. The policy change was generally linked to Sony securing the then-upcoming Final Fantasy VII to be a PlayStation game, of which there were high expectations. Wild Arms was sometimes designated as a holdover game for Final Fantasy VII, which would be released five months later.

First appearing as a video demo on the promotional PlayStation Jampack vol. 1 in January 1997, the full English version of Wild Arms was made available in March of the same year by Sony Computer Entertainment America (SCEA). Due to the short time frame allotted between the game's completion and its North American release, SCEA assigned seven people to work on the translation, nearly twice as many as their previous RPG translation, Beyond the Beyond. Being released just before the Entertainment Software Rating Board (ESRB) updated their video game ratings system, the game thus received two separate North American ratings: first, "Kids to Adults" (K-A), and later "Everyone" (E) for copies released after January 1, 1998, though both versions contain the same software and catalog number. Wild Arms was later released in the PAL region (Europe) in late 1998, with translations into French, Spanish, German, and Italian.

The Wild Arms Original Game Soundtrack was released in Japan on January 22, 1997, and was reprinted two years later. This version was a single compact disc with a sample of the game's music. After the release of the enhanced remake Wild Arms Alter Code: F and its arranged soundtrack, a complete version of the original Wild Arms soundtrack containing all of the game's music, titled Wild Arms Complete Tracks was released on April 6, 2006.

On July 26, 2007, Wild Arms was released on the PlayStation Network (PSN) in Japan, through which it can be played on the PlayStation Portable and, as of Operating System update 1.70, on the PlayStation 3. On December 6, 2007 this version was released on the North American PlayStation Network. On January 4, 2012, Wild Arms was released on the European PlayStation Store.

Wild Arms was included on the PlayStation Classic, a dedicated console for playing PlayStation games. The console was released on December 3, 2018.

Wild Arms was released on the PlayStation 4 and PlayStation 5 for the upgraded PlayStation Plus service on June 13, 2022. This release features the ability to rewind the game, as well as video filters and PlayStation Network trophies.

== Reception ==
Reception

Aggregate score
Aggregator	Score
GameRankings	79%

Review scores
Publication	Score
Electronic Gaming Monthly	35 / 40
Famitsu	8/10, 7/10, 8/10, 8/10
Game Informer	8.75 / 10
GameFan	277 / 300
GameSpot	8.6 / 10
IGN	8 / 10
Next Generation	4/5
RPGFan	94% (1998); 89 / 100 (1999); 85 / 100 (PSN/PS3)
Dengeki PlayStation	80/100, 90/100, 75/100, 70/100

Wild Arms garnered a positive response. It sold over 250,000 copies in Japan during its first two weeks after its release and was positively reviewed by Japanese critics. Game Informer magazine stated that it was "by far one of the best action RPGs of the year", praising the game's use of 3D battle graphics in addition to the colorful 2D graphics of normal gameplay. Their three reviewers scored it 9, 9.25 and 8.5 out of 10. GameFan's three reviewers scored it 95%, 92%, and 90%, and also awarded it their "Game of the Month" honor. They said it's a spectacular RPG" and, "if not for [Final Fantasy VII], Wild Arms would definitely be RPG of the year so far."

Electronic Gaming Monthly's four reviewers scored it 9, 8.5, 9 and 8.5 out of 10, earning it an "Editor's Choice Silver Award". Crispin Boyer said it is "easily the best PlayStation RPG to date". They gave it their "Game of the Month" award. Electronic Gaming Monthly gave Wild Arms the Runner-Up award for Role-Playing Game of the Year of 1997 behind Final Fantasy VII, while a "Reader's Choice Awards" poll run by GamePro gave Wild Arms the 3rd Place award for Best Role-Playing Game behind Final Fantasy VII and Alundra.

Praise for the game centered on its cutting edge visuals, particularly the detailed polygonal graphics and moving camera of the battle sequences. GamePro added that even the graphics outside of battles were on par with the greatest RPGs, and that the game's graphics alone were "enough to make it one of the season's best titles, no matter what the genre." Next Generation emphasized that "Even with Final Fantasy VII around the corner, Wild Arms still packs a strong visual punch that won't soon be forgotten."

Other commonly applauded aspects of the game included the party dynamic where each of the characters had their own role in solving puzzles and defeating enemies. Boyer wrote it was "one of the best party systems in RPG history." Trent Ward praised the puzzles and exploration in GameSpot, and wrote that "Since all of these options are available to you at all times, the role-playing element never feels constraining."

RPGFan approvingly wrote that Wild Arms is "very well designed and is a lot of fun to play" and concluded that it "has a great English translation, interesting ideas and makes you use your brain to solve puzzles." The game held an average rating of 79% on GameRankings at the time of the site's 2019 closure, aggregating reviews from 14 publications.

The game was a finalist for the "Console Role-Playing Game of the Year" at the Academy of Interactive Arts & Sciences' inaugural Interactive Achievement Awards, which was ultimately awarded to Final Fantasy VII.

Later reviews have generally echoed the contemporary reviews of Wild Arms as a decent RPG if not quite an era-definer like Final Fantasy VII was. Bryan Cebulski particularly praised composer Naruke and character designer Yoshihiko Ito in a 2021 review, saying that their great work both defined and sold the fantasy–Western feel the Wild Arms series would become known for. A 2022 review by Robert Ramsey of the downloadable PSN version for the PS4/PS5 called it a "classic" that was charming and still playable, albeit perhaps a tad slow by later standards.

== Legacy ==
The success of Wild Arms led to a series of sequels and spinoffs. These included 5 other console video games, mobile phone adaptations, a manga, and Wild Arms: Twilight Venom, an anime distributed by ADV Films.

== Wild Arms Alter Code: F ==
Alter Code: F has 3D character models in exploration and cutscenes, unlike the original. The art style for the 3D models is also different.

Wild Arms Alter Code: F (Note: Japanese: ワイルドアームズ アルターコード:エフ, Hepburn: Wairudo āmuzu arutā kōdo: F) is an enhanced remake of Wild Arms for the PlayStation 2 (PS2), developed by Media.Vision and published by Sony in Japan and Agetec in North America. The game features a new graphical engine, more playable characters, redesigned dungeons, new puzzles, and other changes. The Japanese version was released on November 17, 2003. The game's North American release was postponed several times until it was released on November 15, 2005. The North American version comes with a bonus DVD featuring the first episode of the Wild Arms anime series, Wild Arms: Twilight Venom. The game was never released in Europe.

The game features more playable characters than the original trio. The rival ARM-wielder Jane Maxwell, scientist Emma Hetfield, and the rogue Metal Demon Zed are recruitable as permanent party members; temporary characters include Jane's servant Magdalene Harts (McDullen Harts in the original translation) and the Elw girl Mariel. Alter Code: F was graphically overhauled for the PS2, and has 3D graphics both in and out of battles. In particular, the graphical style is somewhat more realistically proportioned than the stylized "chibi" characters from the PlayStation version. Various full motion videos (FMVs) were added to illustrate key points in the game as well as for Cecilia's guardian summoning. Scenes within movies with Japanese voices had the voices somewhat awkwardly removed for the North American release, presumably due to a rights issue.

The encounter cancel system from Wild Arms 2 and 3, which allows a player to skip a random battle potentially, was added. The English localization was also redone with new translations. In general, the original translation at times obscured English words in the Japanese script by modifying them, such as localizing a demon named "Berserk" as "Belselk"; Alter Code: F generally opted to reverse these and maintain terms exactly. Other elements were removed; for example, characters no longer have equipment choices nor much in the way of customization, instead growing in power by equipping personal skills and gaining more levels. The capability of escaping a battle once begun was removed, and characters were reduced to only a single Force ability rather than four.

=== Music ===
The soundtrack to Alter Code: F remixed all of the tracks from the original game, as well as added some new tracks. King Records released a soundtrack CD featuring Naruke's remixed tracks for the game, Wild Arms Alter Code: F Original Score, in January 2004. Mike Wilson of RPGFan praised the album, although he thought that perhaps remixing every track may have been excessive – some of the original tracks, such as "Critical Hit!" were fine as they were, and the remix arguably made them worse, in his opinion. Still, he wrote that new tracks such as "Windward Birds" will "remind you why you fell in love with Michiko Naruke in the first place".

=== Reception ===
Reception

Aggregate score
Aggregator	Score
Metacritic	73

Review scores
Publication	Score
Game Informer	6 / 10; 6.25 / 10
GameSpot	7.2 / 10
IGN	7.7 / 10
Official U.S. PlayStation Magazine	3 / 5
RPGamer	2 / 5
RPGFan	82 / 100

The critical reception to Alter Code: F was mixed, with review aggregator Metacritic giving an average critic score of 73/100. Jeremy Dunham of IGN overall enjoyed the game, praising the redesigned dungeons, puzzles and remixed soundtrack, but considered the new graphics bland and unimpressive for the PS2. He also thought that the game's system had been perhaps oversimplified and was a touch on the easy and linear side. Alan Knight of RPGFan also praised the game, saying that it included some nice additions for nostalgic players of the original, although he was unsure if it would receive as high a recommendation from players unfamiliar with the original Wild Arms. Bethany Massimilla of GameSpot thought that while the experience was overall good, the battles were both too frequent and too slow, with characters uselessly milling around and taking too long to perform their actions.

Greg Sewart of Official U.S. PlayStation Magazine was lukewarm, saying that the game was "serviceable" but did not stand out compared to contemporary PS2-era RPGs such as Dragon Quest VIII and Digital Devil Saga. He also criticized the revised battle system as too simplistic and that the "wandering camera" provided awkward views of the game. Matthew Demers at RPGamer thought the remake was underdone and needed additional work, especially criticizing Agetec's English translation and localization as poor. Game Informer had a hostile review. It stated that Naruke's soundtrack remained the highlight, that the story remained compelling, but that the camera angles were awkward, the revamp graphics were unimpressive, and that the overworld search mechanic from Wild Arms 2 and 3 was not fun. It concluded that the original was superior. Bryan Cebulski wrote in a 2021 retrospective that the visuals were bland and plastic, and that the new translation was worse than the original. Cebulski suggested that curious gamers would be better served playing the original rather than the remake.
