= Wild Arms 2 =

1999 video game

- North American version cover art
- Developer: Media.Vision (Note: Additional work by Sony Computer Entertainment Japan.)
- Publisher: Sony Computer Entertainment
- Directors: Eitarō Nagano; Nobukazu Satō
- Producers: Takashi Fukushima; Takahiro Kaneko
- Designer: Akifumi Kaneko
- Writer: Akifumi Kaneko
- Composer: Michiko Naruke
- Series: Wild Arms
- Platform: PlayStation
- Release: JP: September 2, 1999; NA: May 2, 2000
- Genre: Role-playing
- Mode: Single-player

Wild Arms 2, known in Japan as Wild Arms: 2nd Ignition (Note: Japanese: ワイルドアームズ セカンドイグニッション, Hepburn: Wairudo Āmuzu Sekando Igunisshon), is a 1999 role-playing video game developed by Media.Vision and published by Sony Computer Entertainment for the PlayStation. It is the second installment in the Wild Arms series.

When a terrorist organization called Odessa tries to conquer the world, an international anti-terrorist group called ARMS is formed to combat them. They recruit several heroes to help them, including Ashley, a gunfighter; Lilka, a teenage sorceress; and Brad, a former war hero.

Wild Arms 2 was released for the PlayStation Network in Japan on November 28, 2007, and in North America on July 23, 2009.

== Gameplay ==
Wild Arms 2 is a role-playing game that involves the player controlling several characters as they progress through a number of environments, battle enemies, and solve puzzles. The game is presented in an isometric fashion where the player has an overhead view of all the action taking place on a particular screen. While characters are represented as two-dimensional sprites, backgrounds and environments are instead rendered in 3D. The game's camera is centered on the currently controlled character, which can be rotated by the player through 360 degrees.

In order to advance, the player must overcome a number of story-based scenarios and sequences that involving navigating through dungeons while fighting monsters and other enemies that appear randomly every few steps. Oncoming battles are indicated by a speech balloon with an exclamation mark appearing over the character's head, and can in some instances be avoided. Characters progress and grow by gaining experience points after a battle and thereby gain levels, giving them better statistics and making them able to battle increasingly difficult enemies. Progressively more powerful armor and weapons can be purchased for each character from specialized shops in towns throughout the world, and new skills can be learned to help the player complete tougher challenges.

Special devices called "Tools" unique to each character allow the player to traverse otherwise impassable situations while not in battle. These items are obtained at certain points in the game, and allow hidden areas or pathways to be discovered, as well as destroy objects and solve puzzles. Tools such as Brad's "kick boots" allow him to move large objects by hitting them, and Lilka's fire wand allows the player to light torches and activate switches from afar.

=== Tools ===
Throughout the game, one acquires many tools. Each character can unlock three tools. Ashley's tools are the Hurl Knife, Booty Call (secret - telepath tower), and Flare Gun. Brad's tools are the Kick Boots, Bombs, and Earthquake. Lilka utilizes three rods: Fire, Freeze, and Change, which turns large gems into traversable blocks. Tim uses "Pooka", a guide which can unlock secret "medium" powers, as well as Air Ballet and Mist Cloak. Kanon uses the Wire Hook, Rad Blades, and Jump Shoes. Marivel, the secret character, comes with the Electel, and can unlock the Windup Key and My Mike, which summons secret enemies.

=== Battle system ===
While normal gameplay is exhibited using both two and three-dimensional graphics, battle sequences are rendered entirely in 3D. Wild Arms 2 utilizes a turn-based approach to combat, with playable characters and enemies acting according to their "response" or RES statistic, a numerical designation that shows how fast a character is and how soon they can act. A character or enemy with the highest response rate will act first, followed by the next highest in sequence every combat round until the battle is over. Each round, the player has the option of performing a number of actions with each character, including attacking enemies, defending, running from battle, or using curative items to restore hit points, a representation of a particular character's remaining vitality.

In all, six characters are available for use in and out of combat, though only three may be used in a particular battle. In addition to having different statistics such as strength and magic power, each character has a unique set of abilities at their disposal. Ashley and Brad, each firearm users, can use powerful attacks based on whatever weaponry the player has collected throughout the course of the game, while Lilka, a magician, can conjure a variety of spells to either aid party members by curing wounds or damage enemies with harmful magic. Additional members Tim, Kanon, and Marivel have their own respective techniques as well. Each character can be actively switched in or out of a battle at any time, provided enough characters are in the player's party at the time.

== Plot ==
=== Setting ===
Wild Arms 2 is set in the world of Filgaia, a planet with science fiction, steampunk, and traditional fantasy elements such as magic and demons.

Firearms called "ARMs" represent Filgaia's ever-growing warfare technology, and, unlike the first Wild Arms, are not considered inherently dangerous. Similar technology is used to create other mechanical weaponry, including cybernetic limbs and miniature robots. Other forms of high technology such as aircraft, motorized vehicles, and radio devices also appear, though some of their usage is attributed to magic rather than science.

=== Characters ===
The playable characters consist of six heroes (Ashley Winchester, Lilka Eleniak, Brad Evans, Tim Rhymeless, Kanon, and Marivel Armitage) who are called upon by a wealthy benefactor to put an end to the terrorist organization Odessa, the game's principal adversaries. "Operation ARMS" is the moniker of the player's team, led by the reluctant young gunman Ashley Winchester. ARMS is aided by supporting characters, including Ashley's girlfriend Marina. The game's primary conflict stems from the two groups conflicting ideologies on the safety of the world. While Odessa seeks to bring about order through oppression and conformity, ARMs sees Odessa's methods as a sacrifice of freedom and the largest threat to global security.

Marivel is a secret character that can be unlocked at Crimson Castle. Irving Vold Valeria, the leader of ARMS, introduces Marivel in the beginning of the game, and her true form is shown at the "Memory Maze", where the Sword Magess Anastasia reveals herself to Ashley. Marivel then joins ARMS at Crimson Castle, and several different events can be unlocked.

=== Story ===
One thousand years earlier, a great Blaze of Disaster swept the land of Filgaia. The cause was a demon known as Lord Blazer. Many heroes tried to defeat him and failed, until a girl holding the magic sword Argetlahm stepped forth and defeated him. However, she could not kill him; rather, she exchanged her life in order to seal Lord Blazer away forever. The girl's name was forgotten by time, and she became known as simply the Sword Magess.

In the present day, Filgaia is a desolate land, dying steadily. Much of the world has already become desert, and the few areas of greenery left are steadily declining. Ashley Winchester, a member of a military unit near Meria Boule, becomes involved in the fate of the world when his group is involved in a demon summoning experiment. This experiment is conducted by the sinister organization of Odessa in order to resurrect Lord Blazer - or so it seems. After all of his friends and comrades have been possessed by demons, Ashley is finally taken over as well. After killing all of his former comrades, he claims the legendary Argetlahm, which had been brought to the summoning ceremony as a relic. After coming into contact with it, he confronts both the demon inside him, Lord Blazer himself, and the wielder of the sword, the Sword Magess. Repressing Lord Blazer for the time being, Ashley escapes back to his home town of Meria.

Ashley receives an offer from a mysterious man named Irving to join an elite team of fighters named "ARMS" (Agile Remote Missions Squad)/(Awkward Rush and Mission Savers). After accepting, Ashley meets the other two people selected for ARMS: Lilka Eleniak, a girl in training to be a Crest Sorceress, and Brad Evans, an ex-war hero turned criminal. Irving reveals his plans to them: he wishes to combat Odessa, which he claims will make its presence known to the world soon.

== Reception ==
Reception

Aggregate score
Aggregator	Score
GameRankings	68%

Review scores
Publication	Score
AllGame	2.5/5
Electronic Gaming Monthly	7/10 (Note: Three critics of Electronic Gaming Monthly gave the game each a score of 7/10, 6.5/10, and 7.5/10.)
EP Daily	3/10
Famitsu	31/40
Game Informer	8.5/10
GameFan	90%
GameRevolution	C+
GameSpot	5.4/10
IGN	6/10
Next Generation	3/5
Official U.S. PlayStation Magazine	3.5/5
RPGFan	90%

The game received average reviews according to the review aggregation website GameRankings. Eric Bracher of NextGen called it "An adequate title, but one that doesn't have as much to offer as competitors such as Vagrant Story or Alundra 2." In Japan, Famitsu gave it a score of 31 out of 40.

Four-Eyed Dragon of GamePro said, "Wild Arms 2 returns to the classic role-playing style where story and character-building are at the heart of the gameplay. While it doesn't offer anything new to the genre, it's still worth every minute of playing time." (Note: GamePro gave the game two 4/5 scores for graphics and fun factor, 3.5/5 for sound, and 4.5/5 for control in one review.) In another review for GamePro, E. Coli called it "a good game. Its lack of visual splendor in the age of amazing RPGs definitely hinders its chance of sticking out in the crowd. However, gamers whose sole purpose is to find an engaging RPG that will challenge and entertain should definitely give this one a try." (Note: GamePro gave the game 3.5/5 for graphics, two 3/5 scores for sound and control, and 4/5 for fun factor in another review.)
