= Rubik's WOWCube =

Handheld electronic gaming system

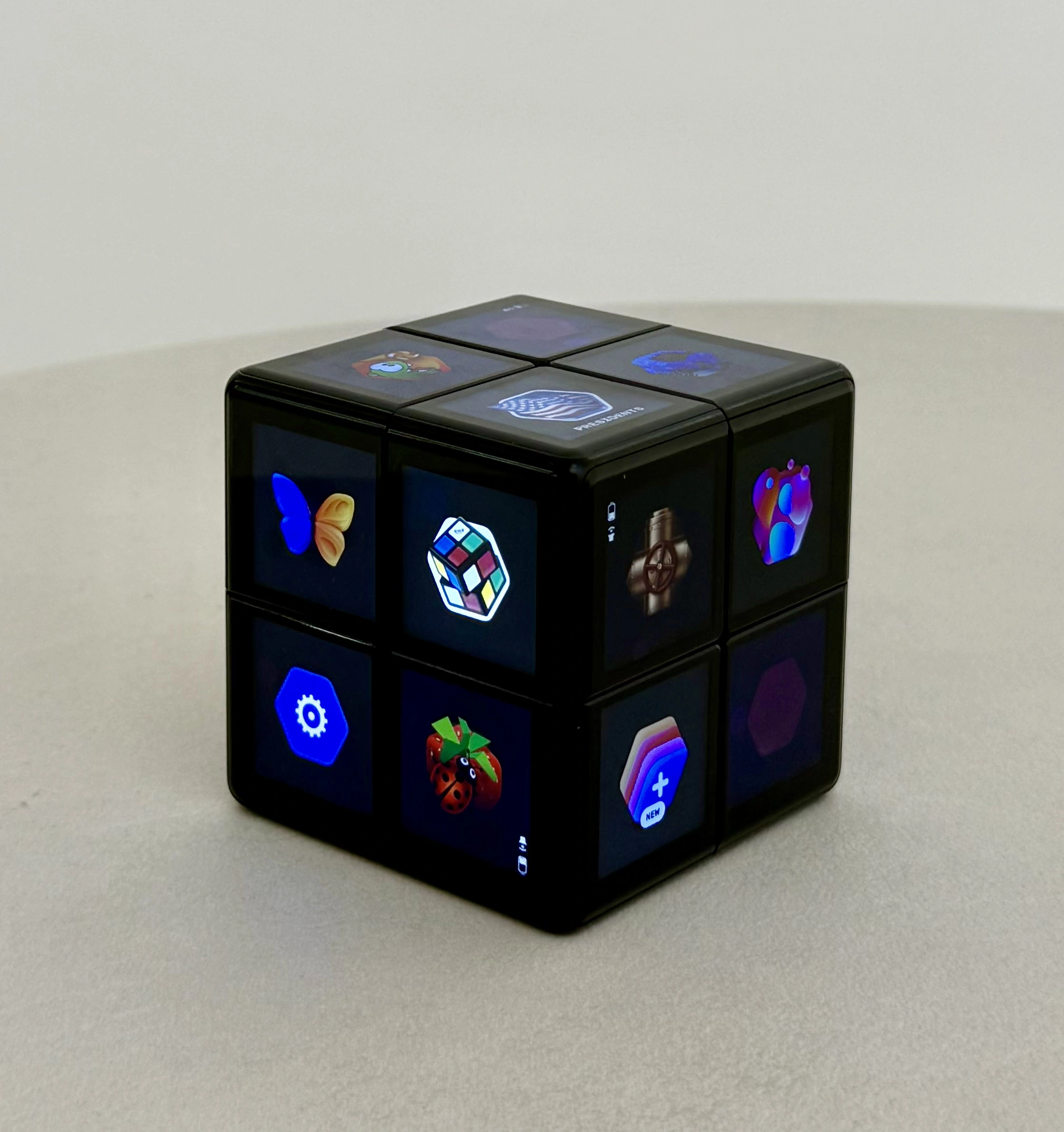
- Developer: Cubios Inc.
- Manufacturer: Shenzhen Mineiwing Electronics Co.
- Product family: Rubik's
- Type: Dedicated handheld gaming system
- Released: 2025
- Introductory price: US$299 (launch price)
- Operating system: CubiOS
- CPU: 8 embedded processors
- Display: 24 IPS LCD panels
- Input: Gyroscopes, accelerometers, microphones
- Controller input: Device itself (twist, tilt, shake)
- Connectivity: Bluetooth
- Power: 3600 mAh battery
- Dimensions: 2.75 x 2.75 x 2.75 in (70 x 70 x 70 mm)
- Weight: 11.29 oz (320 g)

Rubik's WOWCube is a handheld electronic gaming device shaped like a cube. It was developed by Cubios Inc together with Canadian company Spin Master, owner of the Rubik's brand.

The device has a 2×2 cube design with 24 LCD screens and built-in motion sensors. Games are controlled by twisting, tilting and shaking the cube instead of using regular buttons. It can run different games and applications, including licensed versions of Cut the Rope and Space Invaders.

An earlier version, the WOWCube Entertainment System, was included in Time magazine's list of the "100 Best Inventions of 2021".

== History ==
The WOWCube concept dates to 2016, and Cubios Inc. was registered in 2017.

In 2024 Cubios announced partnership with Spin Master, company which owns the Rubik's brand, to release new version called Rubik's WOWCube.

Pre-orders for the Rubik's WOWCube opened in 2025 at a launch price of US$299, ahead of the 2025 holiday season. It is an updated version of the earlier WOWCube Entertainment System, released under the official Rubik's brand.

== Design and features ==
Rubik's WOWCube is made from eight connected modules arranged as 2x2x2 cube. The outside of the device has 24 small IPS LCD screens in total. The cube can be twisted like normal Rubik's Cube while modules still stay connected electronically

Each module contains its own processor and motion sensors. The device also includes speakers, microphones and battery system. According to launch specifications, the cube uses eight processors and battery around 3600 mAh.

Games are controlled mostly by physical movement. Users twist cube parts, tilt or shake the device, and in some games also tap on screens. Besides games, the system can also display simple apps and widgets like clock, weather, photo animations.

Software for the device is installed through smartphone application. The cube connects using Bluetooth and games or widgets can be downloaded from app store.

== Reception ==
The original WOWCube Entertainment System was noted mainly for its multi-screen cube design and motion-based controls. In 2021, Time included it in its "100 Best Inventions" list.

Reviewers of the 2025 Rubik's WOWCube often mentioned its US$299 launch price. PC Gamer questioned whether the device worked as puzzle or novelty gadget, while in Hackaday, Maya Posch wrote that it was not very clear which market the product was aimed at.

Forbes described the device as hybrid of game console and puzzle, and a 2026 Newsweek hands-on article called it a blend of physical puzzle and digital gaming.

The Toy Insider presented the device as STEM-oriented product based on the Rubik's Cube.

In 2026, The official Rubik’s WOWCube System entered the collection of The Strong National Museum of Play and was catalogued in the museum’s Electronic Games department under object numbers 126.1046, 126.1047, and 126.1048.

== See also ==
- Rubik's Revolution
- Sifteo Cubes
- Playdate (console)
- Nintendo Labo
- Tamagotchi
- Bop It!
- Nex Playground
- Pleo
- Toio
