= Sunil Vemuri =

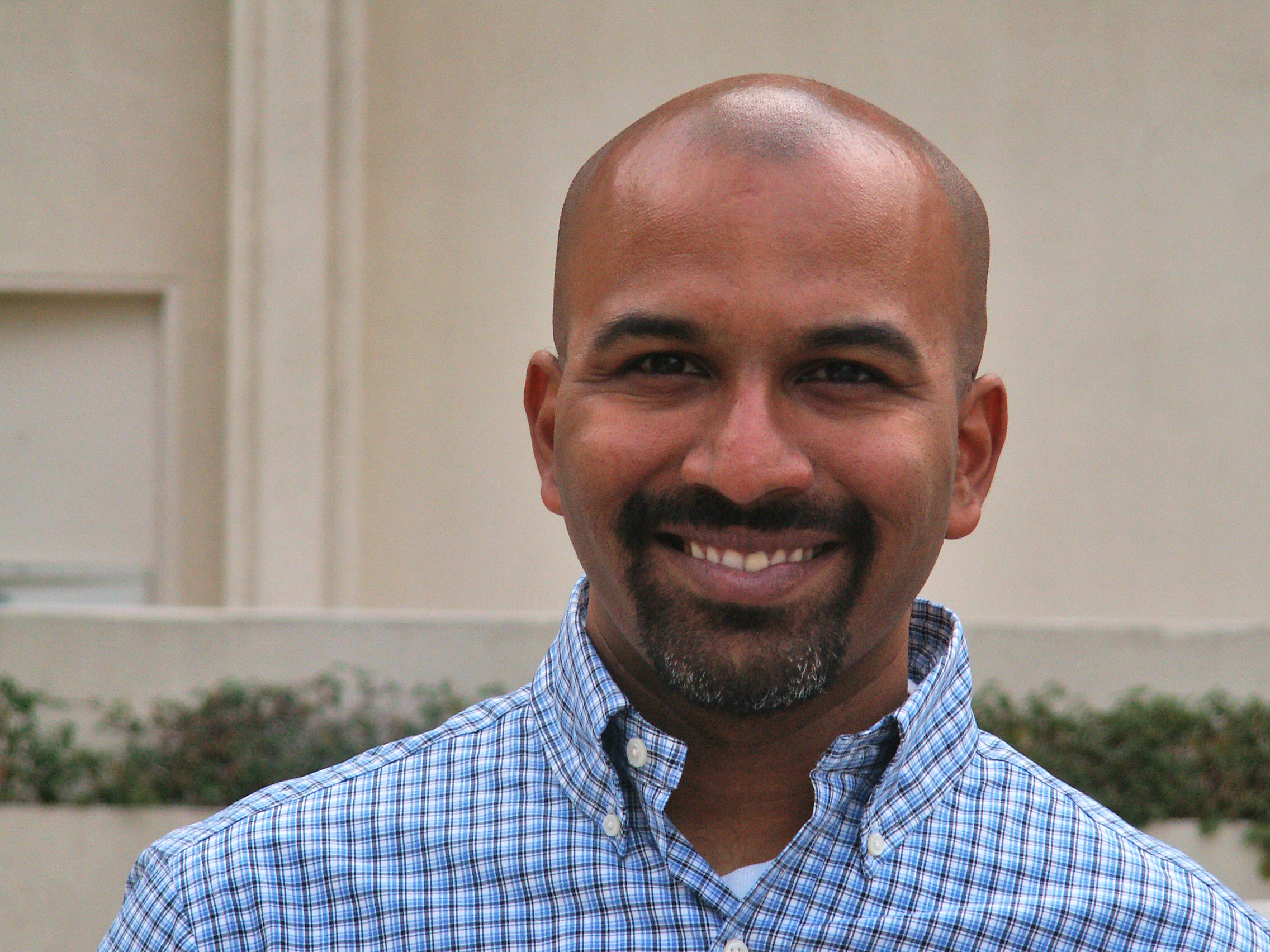

Sunil Vemuri is a co-founder of reQall Inc., an MIT Media Lab spin off, and a NASA Research Partner. His areas of research include human memory assistance, information retrieval, information extraction, information visualization, knowledge acquisition, organizational memory, speech recognition, and interface/interaction design.

CNN has named Sunil Vemuri a "CNN Explorer" in 2005.

On the occasion of the 25th anniversary of MIT's Media Lab, his research has been cited as one of the top 25 ideas that have been spun out of the Media Lab.

Prior to reQall, he worked at France Telecom's Cambridge Lab. and Apple Inc. He has six patents in information retrieval and his research has been extensively covered in mainstream press.

During his student days, Sunil worked at the Beckman Research Institute of the City of Hope hospital near Los Angeles, CA., with Terry Lee and created "MacProMass", a Macintosh program to aid in Mass Spectral Analysis and Protein Chemistry (it has been since renamed MacBioSpec). Sunil received his Ph.D. from MIT Media Lab, a master's degree in Computer Science from Stanford University, and his bachelor's degree in Cybernetics from UCLA.

Sunil Vemuri, Co-founder and Chief Product Officer of reQall, talks about reQall: The Context-Aware Intelligent Assistant Experience in an interview with Robert Scoble.

Sunil is currently a product manager at Google.

== Patents ==
- February 16, 1999 Patent 5,873,107 for "System for automatically retrieving information relevant to text being authored". Borovoy, R., Machiraju, N.R., Graves. M., Vemuri. S.
- February 22, 2000 Patent 6,028,601 for "FAQ link creation between user's questions and answers". Machiraju, N.R., Graves, M., Vemuri, S., Chandhok, R., Lofgren, C.
- June 5, 2001 Patent 6,243,090 for "FAQ Linker". Machiraju, N.R., Graves, M., Vemuri, S., Chandhok, R., Lofgren, C.
- May 11, 2010 Patent 7,716,153 for "Memory assistance system comprising of [sic] a signal processing server receiving a media signal and associated data relating to information to be remembered and processing the input signal to identify media characteristics relevant to aiding user memory". Vemuri, S.
- March 22, 2011 Patent 7,912,454 for "Method and system for archiving data in real-time communications" Vemuri, S. Machiraju N. R.
- July 3, 2012 Patent 8,214,208 for "Method And System For Sharing Portable Voice Profiles". Jacqueline Mallett, Sunil Vemuri, N. Rao Machiraju.

== Publications ==
- Vemuri, S., Schmandt, C., Bender, W., Tellex, S., Lassey, B. "An audio-based personal memory aid." In Proceedings of Ubicomp 2004: Ubiquitous Computing. September 7–10, 2004. Nottingham, UK. 400–417. (2004). pdf
- Vemuri, S., DeCamp, P., Bender, W., Schmandt, C. "Improving Speech Playback Using Time-Compression and Speech Recognition" In Proceedings of CHI 2004. pdf
- Vemuri, S., Schmandt, C., Bender, W. "iRemember: A Personal Long-term Memory Prosthesis". In Proc. of CARPE 2006 (October 2006). pdf
- Vemuri, S., Bender, W. "Next-generation personal memory aids." In BT Technology Journal. 22(4) 125–138 (October 2004). pdf
- Vemuri. S. "Personal long-term memory aids". Ph.D. Dissertation. MIT Media Lab. (September 2004) pdf
- Borovoy, R., Martin, F., Vemuri, S., Resnick, M., Silverman, B., and Hancock, C. "Meme Tags and Community Mirrors: moving from conferences to collaboration" in Proceedings of Computer Supported Cooperative Work. 159–168. (1998). pdf
