= Erwin Huang =

Chinese businessman

Erwin Huang (黃岳永, born 1965) is a Chinese entrepreneur.

== Early life ==
Erwin Huang is the son of Steve Huang, who was the first Chinese person to be appointed as General Manager of Rediffusion Television Limited. Huang's mother, Prof. Dolly P. Huang, was the Honorary Professor of the Department of Clinical Oncology in the Chinese University of Hong Kong and the pioneering expert in nasopharyngeal cancer. Huang has an elder sister and a younger brother.

Huang received his primary and secondary education in La Salle College, where he went to the same class as Brandon Lee, the son of Bruce Lee. To prove he could do as good as his dad, Huang applied and got admitted successfully to the University of California, Berkeley, the university where his dad graduated in. However, after studying there for six months, his dad made him transfer to Occidental College in Los Angeles because his father thought the university ‘was not suitable’ to him.

During his studies, Huang's father refused to pay anything but his tuition to avoid him being distracted from school. He worked part-time after school to buy his first car, which was then worth US$65. He also used the salary of his part-time job to travel around US and Europe, demonstrating that it was possible to “read thousands of books and travel thousands of miles at the same time”. The social entrepreneur graduated at Boston University in 1986 with a double degree in Information Technology and System Management. Huang has also studied in MIT, Harvard Business School and Tsinghua University in Beijing. He likes to meet with young people and undergraduates to exchange ideas and experience in many university talks in Hong Kong.

== Career ==
Huang's career started in Apple Inc in US. Thereafter, he focused on establishing his own start-up companies and software development. He invested and ran various publishing, information technology and telecommunication companies, as well as developing software for phones (which were the predecessors of smartphone apps) in Hong Kong, China, Tokyo, San Francisco, Silicon Valley, New York, Brazil and London.

In 2005, he was invited to join Tse Sui Luen Jewellery (International) Limited (thereafter known as TSL; HKEx 417) and was appointed as CEO in 2008. Huang is now the Non-Executive Director and Deputy Chairman. In 2008, he worked with Senior Citizen Home Safety Association and CSL Mobile to develop Personal Emergency Link Service successfully.

In 2009, Huang participated in TV reality show “Rich Mate Poor Mate Series” to explore the problem of extreme disparity between the rich and the poor in Hong Kong, which was his first time experiencing the despair of the poverty-stricken communities in real life. In 2011, he founded the social enterprise WebOrganic. He is currently the Vice Chairman of the enterprise. Huang was also the President of Hong Kong Information Technology Federation (HKITF), Chairman of eLearning Consortium and Vice Chairman of SCHSA (safety bell).

In 2016, Huang accepted the invitation from The Hong Kong University of Science and Technology (HKUST) to be appointed as Adjunct Professor of Information Systems, Business Statistics and Operations Management in School of Business, Associate Professor of Engineering Practice in School of Engineering, and Senior Advisor of Centre for Education Innovation in Entrepreneurship.

=== Information technology ===
After graduating from university, Huang joined Apple in 1986 responsible for the retail and distribution network in China. He was the first person selling Apple computers to China. At that time, Apple's Macintosh did not provide a Chinese version. Therefore, Huang went back to the headquarters and negotiated for a Chinese version with PageMaker. In 1989, he returned to Hong Kong to start his business. In two months’ time, he introduced the desktop publishing layout software PageMaker (Chinese version) to Hong Kong. By breaking the limits of the traditional publishing industry, as well as assisting the first publication of Next Magazine, Huang had thus successfully earned HK$10 million.

The introduction of PageMaker allowed people to do publishing work on a desktop computer easily, therefore gradually replacing the traditional typesetting technology. Then, Huang started doing web-based software development. The Internet was starting to take off at that time. He founded Digital Creation to write websites and develop a campus information-sharing software Schoolteam, allowing students to access information online anytime, anywhere. The software was highly recognized by Dr Rao Machiraju, the Director of Technology of Apple Inc at that time. Dr Machiraju thus invited him to Silicon Valley to found Magically, Inc., which provided online virtual office, email communication and information synchronization SyncML services. Through acquisition of a listed company in the United Kingdom, Huang helped the company to get listed in the Alternative Investment Market in the UK. Magically's strategic investors included Richard Li Tzar Kai.

In 2003, due to his parents severe illness, Huang decided to sell his business in US and returned to Hong Kong. In 2004, he founded Digital Life and became an angel investor who focused on investing technology companies with good prospects. In 2007, the technology expert started Xtown Mobile to develop smartphone apps. In 2009, his company worked with Next Media to develop an iPhone version for Apple Daily. In 2011, Xtown Mobile made to the top five in Microsoft's list of top technology developers in China.

Huang once said his personal investment rule is “insisting not to invest in sectors that he is unfamiliar with” but he admitted that he had also made failed investments. Before the dot-com bubble in Hong Kong, he invested in Albert Cheng’s 36.com. Prior to the public listing of the company, he invested HKD$700,000, which later soared to a top of HKD$2,000,000. However, its stock price collapsed eventually and was worth virtually nothing in the end. He later revealed in an interview that around 25% of the companies he invested in would succeed, higher than the industry average of angel investment.

=== Business ===
In 2005, Huang was invited by his college classmate Tommy Tse Tat-fung to join Tse Sui Luen Group as one of the Board of Directors. In less than a month, Tse Sui-luen and his son, Tommy Tse Tat-fung, were arrested by ICAC for an alleged illegal commission scheme and misappropriating listed company funds. Huang said in an interview that at that moment he was not sure whether he had joined an unscrupulous shop. Yet, he still decided to continue his work with the company for personal loyalty.

Huang was promoted to the CEO of TSL Group in June 2008, working alongside Tommy Tse Tat-fung's wife, Annie Yau On Yee, the Chairman of the company. The company was resumed to trading in 2009, and Huang was promoted to Deputy Chairman of the TSL Group. Despite the 2008 financial crisis, the Group's performance improved in the poor-performing market with a 60% increase in net profit. After the resumption of trading in June 2009, the stock price had been increased tenfold within 6 months. In early 2010, Huang decided to resign as the company CEO and only kept his position as the Deputy Chairman in order to spare more time on community and education work. On March 1, 2015, Huang resigned as TSL Group’s Executive Director, Executive Committee member and Business Development Director and became Non-executive Director and Deputy Chairperson of the company, acting as the advisor and consultant of the Group.

Huang repeatedly said that he was more interested in entrepreneurship than working as an employee. He once said his work in TSL Group had always been a challenge to him, but it was surely not an end. During his employment at TSL Group, the serial entrepreneur founded Xtown. Huang once said in an interview his financial return on investing in Xtown might not be higher than his income in TSL Group, however, he believed life was not only about making a lot of money, and he felt much more satisfied if he could bring a revolution and make a difference to the industry.

=== Social innovations ===
In 2008, Huang, then Vice-president of Senior Citizen Home Safety Association, served as the Convener of “Mobile Link” and cooperated with CSL to develop Personal Emergency Link Service, also known as Safety Bell for the elderly. In the following year, Huang was invited to join RTHK’s reality TV show “Mate Poor Mate Series” to experience the lives of the underprivileged, which became the turning point of his life. During the reality show, he took some freelance cleaning jobs in Tsz Wan Shan in Hong Kong, earning 50 HKD (around US$6.4) per day and living in a rental of 700HKD (US$90) per month subdivided apartment in Sham Shui Po for 5 days. The only thing he could bring with him was his iPhone during the 5-day experience.

On the show premier, the General Manager of YMCA Hong Kong, Dr. Alice Yuk said to him, “You returned to your own world, but their lives are still the same. Many people are still very poor. What can we do to help?” This has prompted him to resign as the CEO of TSL Group in 2010. In May next year, Huang founded WebOrganic.

In May 2014, Huang partnered with Wayne Chau to start a new social enterprise “Agent of Change”. They found out that many poor people in Hong Kong bought cooking oil with a small cup in little street shops for 2 HKD each time. This kind of oil, however, was produced by food residue and trash without any safety protection. The social enterprise cooperated with the biggest oil refinery in Hong Kong, Hop Hing Oil Refinery, and borrowed the venues of non-profit organizations, district councilor offices and schools to provide cooking oil to the poor at a 30% discount.

Huang has emphasized multiple times that the products from social enterprises are not cheap product. Instead, every social enterprise that he involves in provides the best products for his customers. His mission is to teach Social Innovation and Entrepreneurship to university students and to let more young generations understand entrepreneurial spirit, identify social issues, as well as creating social impact through innovations.

== Social impact and awards ==
=== Mobile Link ===
A sudden cold snap hit Hong Kong in the 90s, killing almost a hundred of old people in town. Senior Citizen Home Safety Association was thus founded to research on the ways to use technology to provide safety for our elderly, using a self-sufficient model independent on the government subsidy. In 1996, Huang joined the Association as a founding committee member, serving as an IT consultant to develop Mobile Link. The Association decided to use a sustainable business model to run the organization and successfully broke even in 3 years.

Huang served as the project convener and developed Personal Emergency Link Service in 2008. Mobile Link is effectively the outdoor version of Safety Bell, allowing senior citizens to call emergency service with one click when an accident occurs. In 2010, Personal Emergency Link Service received the Grand Prize of the Digital Opportunity Award from World Information Technology and Services Alliance.

=== WebOrganic ===
Founded in 2011, the meaning of the company name WebOrganic is “to provide hardware and software support to make e-learning possible, which in turn opens up new opportunities for the children”. The goal of the enterprise is to bridge the digital gap in Hong Kong with a mission to provide equal learning opportunities for over 200,000 poor students through enabling access to numerous e-learning opportunities by selling affordable device and Internet services. Participating organizations include Apple, Google, Microsoft and other international corporations.

In 2013, the government terminated a contract with the eInclusion Foundation, which is affiliated with the Internet Professional Association (iProA), to co-run a HK$220 million internet subsidy scheme that helped underprivileged children, due to untruthful information about its operation. In the same year, WebOrganic and The Boy's and Girls’ Association of Hong Kong started to implement the Internet Learning Support to assist students from low-income families to perform online learning at home. In 2014, WebOrganic organized a fundraising campaign “WebOrganic Walkathon” to raise fund to purchase 100 computers for 100 children in need.

In 2013, its service extended beyond Hong Kong to Cambodia and Africa. The company is planning to expand its operation to South East Asia and Mongolia to help more underprivileged students.

=== e-Learning ===
Huang is the non-official member of the Steering Committee on Strategic Development of Information Technology in Education of the Education Bureau. In 2009, Hong Kong Information Technology Federation] founded e-Learning Consortium. Being the Convener of the federation, Huang started to promote this e-Learning as the new teaching methodology in different channels. He once wrote in his newspaper column that this was another education reform after the emergence of blackboard hundreds of years ago. Huang criticized the Hong Kong government for its lack of long-term vision on promoting e-Learning in the city and its sluggish progress in providing schools with basic internet infrastructure. Huang advocates the adoption of “Flipping Classroom” teaching method in Hong Kong. With WiFi installations in 100 schools in town, some schools allowed their pupils to “bring your own device (BYOD)” for class from September 2014.

== Media and publishing ==
=== TV programmes ===
In the 90s, Huang acted as “Dr. Wong” to host a TV programme “Complete PC Handbook” (完全電腦手冊) and “The Smart Tribe” (精靈一族) on Asia Television (ATV), teaching information technology.

=== Radio programmes ===
From 1998 to 1999, the IT expert hosted a radio programme “The Brainy Notebook” (有腦事件簿) on Hong Kong Metro Radio. He started to host another radio programme “Life Hacker” (思潮作動。生活黑客) on RTHK from 2014.

=== Publishing and blogging ===
Due to the popularity of Huang's TV programme, Huang published “Dr Wong’s Nethandbook”, which was the first Internet reference book written in Chinese. He later published “XP Digital Life” (XP 數碼生活), becoming the first Information Technology textbook adopted in primary schools in Hong Kong.

He writes occasionally on newspaper column discussing how to use technology to improve people's lives and make public policy and facilities more user-centric. He suggested introducing the role of a chief technology officer (CTO) in Hong Kong with an aim to keep the city abreast of the technological advancement in the world. In 2014, Huang became a columnist of Hong Kong Economic Journal. He also publishes articles on Facebook regularly.

== Religion and beliefs ==
Huang is a Christian. He once said Christian leaders had been using unilateral way to instruct and educate believers, yet, the interaction was necessary nowadays. He believes that the widespread availability of smartphone serves as an interactive platform and provides a good opportunity for Christians to spread the message from God to the public.

== Interests ==
When iPhone was first premiered in 2007, Huang was widely reported to be the first Hongkonger to fly from Hong Kong to Apple's headquarters in the U.S. to queue up to purchase an iPhone. His work had always been related to Apple. He had worked at Apple and developed smartphone apps. When filming the TV reality show “Rich Mate Poor Mate Series”, he chose to keep his iPhone as the only one belonging without a second thought. Therefore, media like to call him the “No. 1 fan of Apple”.
