= Nagabhushanam =

Nagabhushanam may refer to:

- Shiva, major Hindu deity, also known as Nagabhushana (adorned with snakes)
- Nagabhushanam (actor), Indian actor in Telugu cinema
- T. D. J. Nagabhushanam, Indian agriculturalist
- Nagabhushan Rao Machiraju, Indian-American CEO
- Kadaru Nagabhushanam, (1902–1976), Indian film director and producer

== See also ==
- Nagabhushana, Indian actor
