= Jott =

Jott and company
- Website type: Voicemail service
- Available in: English
- Owner: Jott Networks Inc.
- Creators: John Pollard, Shreedhar Madhavapeddi
- Website: www.jott.com
- Commercial: Yes
- Registration: Required
- Launched: April 2006

Jott was a web-based voice-to-text transcription service which allowed its users to call a toll-free telephone number and speak for up to 30 seconds. The speech was then transcribed to text using a combination of computerized speech recognition software and human transcribers who worked in a "sterile environment which also includes medical dictation." The message could be sent back to oneself, turned into a reminder, sent to a contact or group, or sent to a third-party "Jott link" such as LiveJournal.

== History ==
Jott was founded in April 2006 and gained $5.4 million in venture capital in May 2007. Investors in the firm included Ackerley Partners and Draper Richards.

As of July 14, 2009, the company was purchased by Nuance Communications.

On April 4, 2011, it was announced that the Jott.com service would be ending on May 3, allowing the company to instead "focus our voice-to-text service investments on carrier and enterprise distribution".

== Service ==
Transcribed messages could be delivered to recipients via email, text message, or both. After completing its beta stage, Jott services were offered according to several subscription plans: Jott Basic (free); Jott ($4/month) and Jott Pro ($13/month). There were other plans such as the $9.95 per month package, which included forty transcribed voice mails.

== See also ==
- reQall
