= Machiraju =

Machiraju (Telugu: మాచిరాజు) is a Telugu surname. Notable people with the surname include:

- Pradeep Machiraju, Indian-American scientist and business executive
- Rao Machiraju (born 1985), Indian television actor
