= Hiroshi Ishii (computer scientist) =

Japanese computer scientist

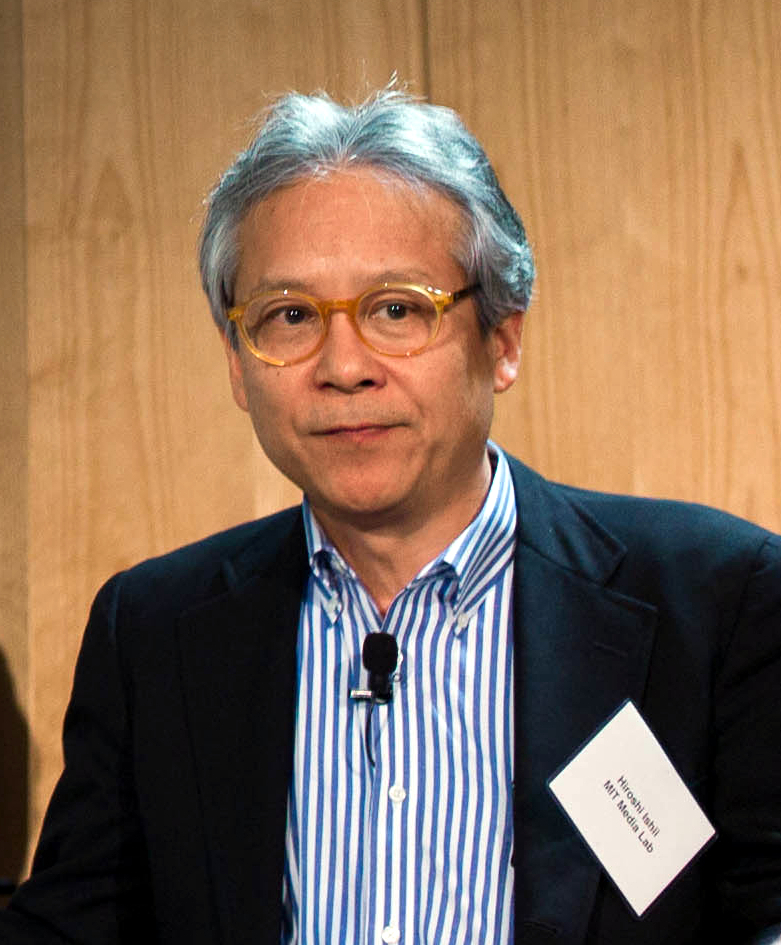
- Born: Tokyo
- Education: Hokkaido University
- Known for: Tangible User Interfaces (TUI)
- Scientific career
- Fields: Computer Science; Human-Computer Interaction (HCI)
- Workplaces: Massachusetts Institute of Technology

Hiroshi Ishii (石井 裕, Ishii Hiroshi; born 1956) is a Japanese computer scientist and a professor at the Massachusetts Institute of Technology. He is also Associate Director of the MIT Media Laboratory.

== Early life and education ==
Ishii was born in Tokyo and raised in Sapporo, Japan. He received a Bachelor of Engineering degree in electronic engineering (1978), and Master of Engineering (1980) and PhD (1992) in computer engineering, all from Hokkaido University in Sapporo.

== Career ==
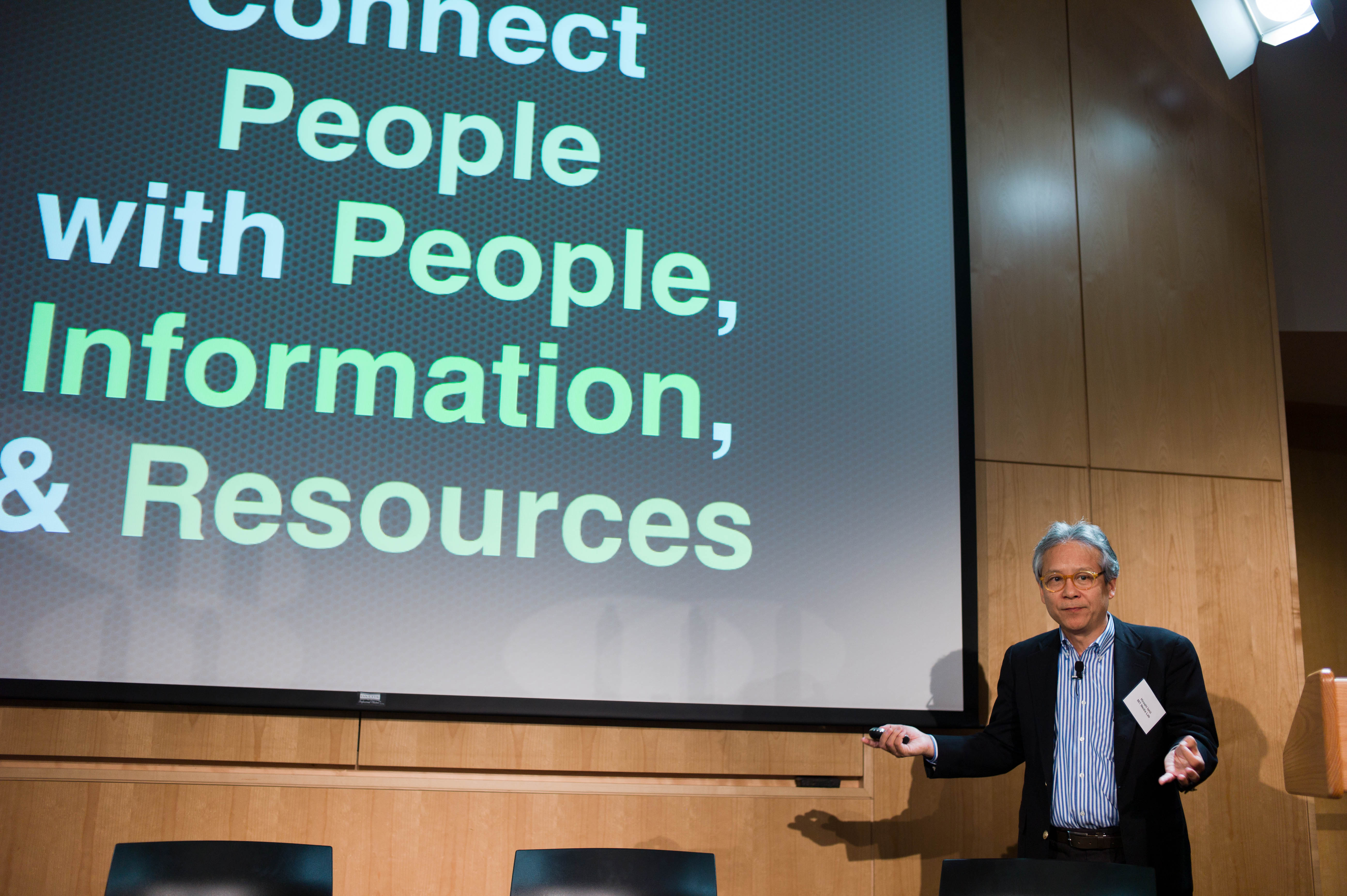
in Boston on April 6, 2012

Ishii worked at Japan's NTT Human Interface Laboratories in Yokosuka, where he made his mark in Human-Computer Interaction (HCI) and Computer-Supported Cooperative Work (CSCW) in the early 1990s.

During his time at NTT, he co-authored two papers. In 1990 he and Kazuho Arita created the "TeamWorkStation." This device allowed users to record their desk and broadcast it to another user in a video conference, similar to a service like Zoom or Discord. His second project at NTT was the "ClearBoard", which was published in 1992. This piece of technology allowed to users to write on a see-through white-board like device that allowed them to maintain eye contact while collaborating.

In 1995, he joined the MIT Media Laboratory as a professor of Media Arts and Sciences, and founded the Tangible Media Group and started their ongoing Tangible Bits project.

In 1997, Ishii pioneered Tangible User Interfaces (TUI) in the field of human-computer interaction with the paper Tangible Bits: Towards Seamless Interfaces between People, Bits and Atoms, co-authored with his then PhD student Brygg Ullmer. In 2005, Ishii, Ullmer, and Robert J. K. Jacob published a token+constraint framework for tangible interfaces.

In 2012, he extended his vision of HCI to "Radical Atoms", a hypothetical future generation of materials which can change form and properties dynamically and computationally, becoming as reconfigurable in the physical 3D world as pixels on a 2D graphical user interface (GUI) screen. Ishii's inFORM display, released in 2013, is a tactile tabletop device for prototyping interfaces, with an appearance compared to a pin board. The TRANSFORM, a larger-scale shape-changing table, received the A'Design Platinum Award in 2015.

Ishii was elected to the CHI Academy in 2006. In 2019, he received the SIGCHI Lifetime Research Award. He was named to the 2022 class of ACM Fellows, "for contributions to tangible user interfaces and to human-computer interaction".

As of 2025, he teaches the class MAS.834 Tangible Interfaces at the Media Lab.
