= Siftable =

Siftables are small computers that display graphics on their top surface and sense one another and how they are being moved. Siftables were developed as a platform for hands-on interactions with digital information and media and were the prototype for Sifteo cubes.

Siftables were created by David Merrill and Jeevan Kalanithi when they were graduate students at the MIT Media Lab. Merrill and Kalanithi are friends from their undergraduate years at Stanford, where they both majored in symbolic systems, Merrill focusing on human-computer interaction and Kalanithi on artificial intelligence and neuroscience.

Merrill and Kalanithi were surrounded by colleagues at the Media Lab who were working on wireless sensor networks (e.g. the Tribble project,) and tangible user interfaces (e.g. Topobo). Merrill and Kalanithi wanted to create a general-purpose tangible user interface that leveraged the technologies of wireless sensor networks. From this idea came the idea of interactive tiles that would enable people to interact with collections of virtual objects—digital pictures, document files, etc.—in the same way that people interact with collections of small physical objects like LEGO —another common sight at the Media Lab.

The initial applications envisioned for Siftables were organizing personal media (digital photos, songs, videos) and facilitating business processes, such as coordinating people, distributing tasks, and creating Gantt charts.

Merrill was invited to present Siftables at the 2009 TED Conference, held in Long Beach / Palm Springs February 3–7, 2009. During his talk, he demonstrated several applications on Siftables: portraits that reacted to being placed next to one another, mixing colors from "paint buckets" on adjacent cubes, building the Fibonacci sequence with an arithmetic application, creating words by arranging individual letters, an interactive graphical narrative for children, and constructing a music sequence. The video of Merrill's TED talk quickly went viral once online, attracting over 1 million views. With this indication of widespread interest in the concept of Siftables, Merrill and Kalanithi decided to focus on developing Siftables into a retail product.

The transformation of Siftables into Sifteo cubes (the retail product sold by Sifteo, Inc.) required a complete re-implementation of code and hardware. While the underlying capabilities—the ability to sense tilting, shaking, rotation, and neighboring—of Siftables and Sifteo cubes are the same, the technology behind them is significantly different.

== See also ==
- Tangible User Interface
- Distributed sensor network
- Game console
- Perceptual learning
