= Sifteo Cubes =

Sifteo Cubes are an interactive gaming platform developed by Sifteo, Inc. The cubes are 'motion-aware' and 1.5-inch in size with touch screens. They are designed for use by players ages six and up. On August 30, 2012, Sifteo announced the second generation of their product, Sifteo Cubes Interactive Game System, which was meant to have improved upon various perceived deficiencies of the original Sifteo Cubes. Sifteo was acquired by 3D Robotics in July 2014 for an undisclosed amount of money and Sifteo Cubes were discontinued.

== History ==
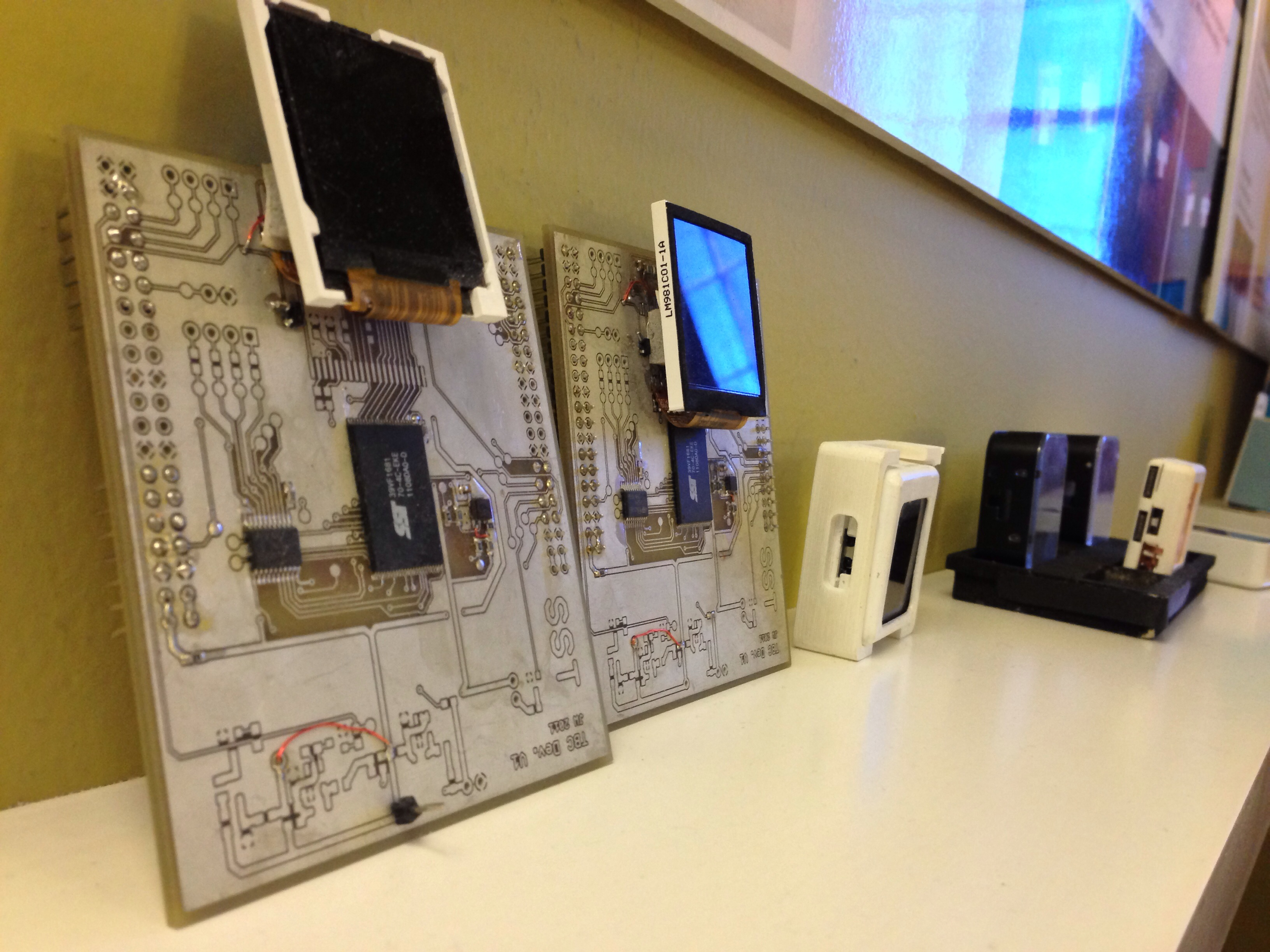
Various Sifteo Cube prototypes

The original Sifteo Cubes evolved from Siftables, a working prototype technology developed by David Merrill and Jeevan Kalanithi at the MIT Media Lab. The Siftables prototype was previewed at the TED Conference in February 2009. After leaving the Media Lab, Merrill and Kalanithi founded Sifteo, Inc. to manufacture and market the original Sifteo Cubes.

Sifteo, Inc. debuted Sifteo Cubes at the 2011 Consumer Electronics Show in Las Vegas, at which the original Sifteo Cubes were named an International CES Innovations 2011 Design and Engineering Awards Honoree. The company began distribution of the original Sifteo Cubes in September 2011. The product's successor, Sifteo Cubes Interactive Game System, was announced on August 30, 2012, and began shipping on November 23, 2012.

The company was acquired by 3D Robotics in July 2014. The company's website has been removed. The software to program the cubes was moved to GitHub, and parts open-sourced on December 23, 2014. The product is no longer offered for sale.

== Features ==
A range of games were available for the original Sifteo Cubes, most created by Sifteo. Sifteo games are designed to be fun while encouraging the development of core thinking skills, such as spatial reasoning, strategy, collaboration, and pattern recognition. Most games target ages 7+, though some are for children as young as four. LoopLoop, an interactive music game that won Best in Show at the 2012 Interaction Awards, was designed and created by San Francisco-based interaction design and development firm Stimulant.

Users start, stop, download, and create games using Siftrunner. The Creativity Kit within Siftrunner enables users with no knowledge of programming to create their own sorting games.

An Alpha software development kit was available for free on Sifteo's website. Sifteo encouraged users to create their own games and applications for Sifteo Cubes and, in December 2011, began accepting game submissions for inclusion in the Sifteo store.

Each Sifteo cube is a 1.5-inch wide block that had a clickable, full color LCD screen, a variety of motion sensors and a rechargeable battery. Sifteo Cubes support 4 hours of play on a single charge; they recharge in a custom Sifteo charging dock.

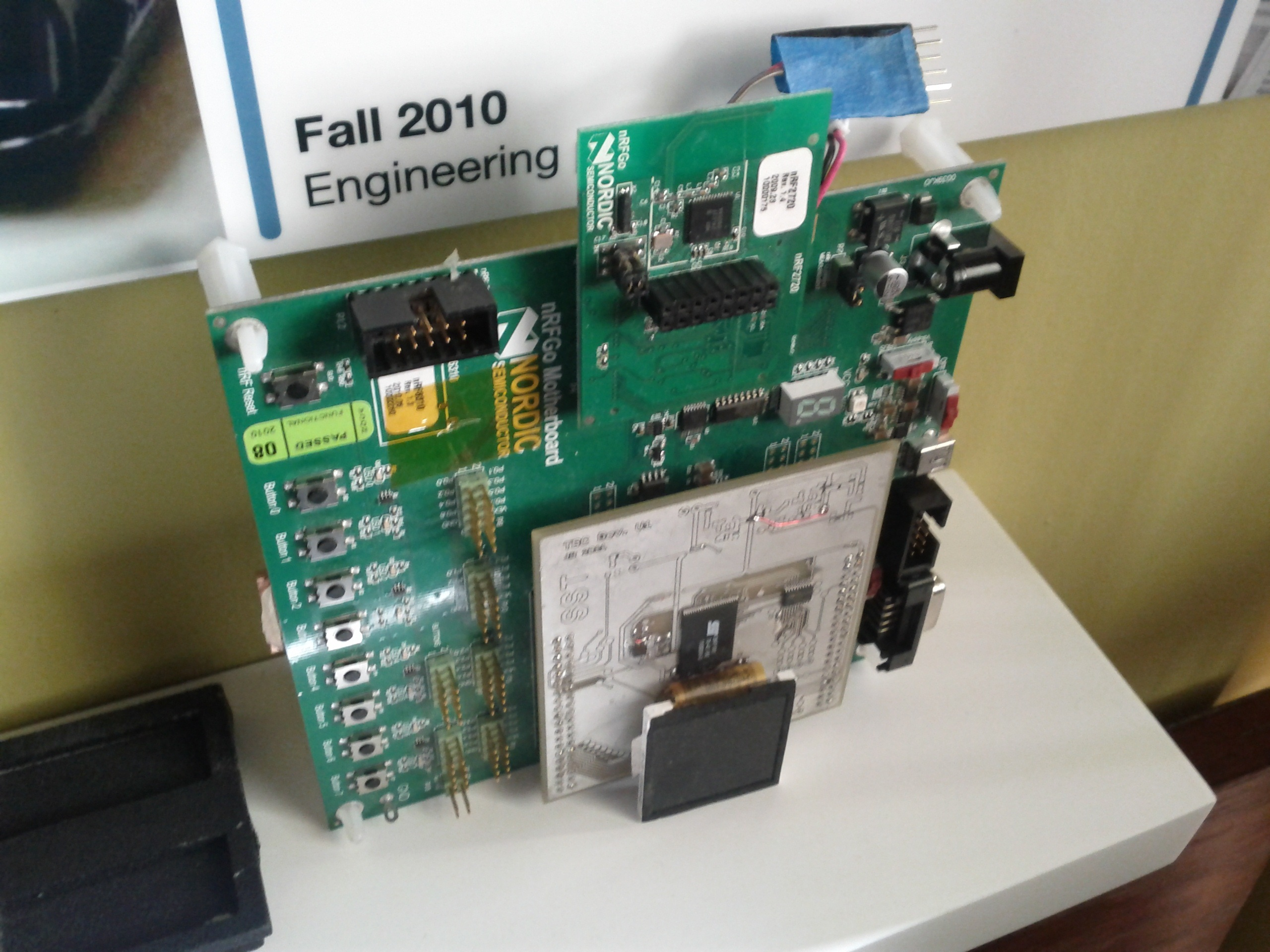
A prototype Sifteo cube

The technical specifications of a Sifteo Cubes are the following:

- 32-bit ARM CPU
- 128 x 128 color TFT LCD
- 3-axis accelerometer
- 8MB Flash
- Lithium Polymer rechargeable battery
- 2.4 GHz wireless radio
- Proprietary near-field object sensing technology

== See also ==
- Tangible user interface
- Distributed cognition
- Perceptual learning
