= Robert J. K. Jacob =

American computer scientist

- Born: Robert Joseph Kassel Jacob
- Education: Johns Hopkins University (BA, MSE, PhD)
- Known for: Eye movement-based interfaces; Reality-Based Interaction
- Awards: SIGCHI Academy (2007); ACM Fellow (2016)
- Scientific career
- Fields: Human-computer interaction
- Institutions: U.S. Naval Research Laboratory; Tufts University
- Thesis: Computer-Produced Faces as an Iconic Display for Complex Data (1976)
- Website: engineering.tufts.edu/cs/people/faculty/robert-jacob

Robert J. K. Jacob is an American computer scientist and professor at Tufts University, known for his work on eye tracking and the Reality-Based Interaction framework for post-WIMP interfaces. He was elected to the ACM SIGCHI Academy in 2007 and named an ACM Fellow in 2016.

== Early life and education ==
Jacob grew up in Brooklyn, New York. He attended Johns Hopkins University, earning a B.A. in 1972, an M.S.E. in 1973, and a Ph.D. in 1976, in Electrical Engineering. His dissertation used computer-generated Chernoff faces to encode multivariate data; each facial feature encoded a different piece of information, which he found to aid the rapid visual parsing of quantitative datasets.

== Career ==
After Johns Hopkins, Jacob worked in the Human-Computer Interaction Lab at the United States Naval Research Laboratory in Washington, D.C. During this time, he also taught computer science at George Washington University. He then joined Tufts University, where he is a professor in the Department of Computer Science and leads research at the Human-Computer Interaction Lab.

== Research ==
=== Eye movement-based interfaces ===
At the Naval Research Laboratory, Jacob investigated eye tracking as an input modality for human-computer interfaces. He identified the "Midas Touch problem" with eye movement-controlled interfaces: because users must look around to perceive an interface, gaze-based systems cannot distinguish intentional commands from simple visual scanning. He rejected blinks as a trigger and found dwell time more practical than button presses.

He later extended this work into a broader survey of eye tracking in human-computer interaction and usability research.

=== Reality-Based Interaction ===
At Tufts, Jacob contributed to research on tangible interaction. He co-authored a framework for token-and-constraint systems that described how physical objects can represent and manipulate digital information.

In 2006, he organized a workshop at CHI to identify commonalities among emerging interaction styles. He named the framework "Reality-Based Interaction", under which grouped a seemingly unrelated set of emerging post-WIMP interface technologies, including multi-touch screens and emotion-reading systems, under four underlying themes: naïve physics, body awareness, environmental awareness, and social awareness. The framework proposed that interfaces drawing on users' existing knowledge of the physical world could reduce the cognitive cost of learning to use them.

== Recognition ==
Jacob was inducted into the SIGCHI Academy in 2007. He was named an ACM Fellow in 2016 "for contributions to human-computer interaction, particularly new interaction modes and novel user interface software formalisms."

== Selected publications ==
- Jacob, Robert J. K. (April 1983). "Using Formal Specifications in the Design of a Human-Computer Interface". Communications of the ACM. 26 (4). Association for Computing Machinery: 259–264. doi:10.1145/2163.358093.
- Jacob, Robert J. K. (October 1986). Bergeron, R. Daniel (ed.). "A Specification Language for Direct-Manipulation User Interfaces". ACM Transactions on Graphics. 5 (4). Association for Computing Machinery: 283–317. doi:10.1145/27623.27624.
- Jacob, Robert J. K. (March 1, 1990). "What You Look at Is What You Get: Eye Movement-Based Interaction Techniques". CHI '90: Proceedings of the SIGCHI Conference on Human Factors in Computing Systems. Association for Computing Machinery. pp. 11–18. doi:10.1145/97243.97246.
- Jacob, Robert J. K. (April 1991). Allen, Robert B. (ed.). "The Use of Eye Movements in Human-Computer Interaction Techniques: What You Look at Is What You Get". ACM Transactions on Information Systems. 9 (2). Association for Computing Machinery: 152–169. doi:10.1145/123078.128728.
- Jacob, Robert J. K.; Sibert, Linda E.; McFarlane, Daniel C.; Mullen, M. Preston Jr. (March 1994). Olsen, Dan R. Jr. (ed.). "Integrality and Separability of Input Devices". ACM Transactions on Computer-Human Interaction. 1 (1). Association for Computing Machinery: 3–26. doi:10.1145/174630.174631.
- Jacob, Robert J. K.; Karn, Keith S. (2003). "Eye Tracking in Human-Computer Interaction and Usability Research: Ready to Deliver the Promises". In Hyönä, Jukka; Radach, Ralph; Deubel, Heiner (eds.). The Mind's Eye: Cognitive and Applied Aspects of Eye Movement Research. Amsterdam: North-Holland. pp. 573–605. ISBN 978-0-444-51020-4.
- Ullmer, Brygg; Ishii, Hiroshi; Jacob, Robert J. K. (March 2005). "Token+Constraint Systems for Tangible Interaction with Digital Information". ACM Transactions on Computer-Human Interaction. 12 (1). Association for Computing Machinery: 81–118. doi:10.1145/1057237.1057242.
- Jacob, Robert J. K.; Girouard, Audrey; Hirshfield, Leanne M.; Horn, Michael S.; Shaer, Orit; Solovey, Erin Treacy; Zigelbaum, Jamie (April 6, 2008). "Reality-Based Interaction: A Framework for Post-WIMP Interfaces". CHI '08: Proceedings of the Twenty-Sixth Annual SIGCHI Conference on Human Factors in Computing Systems. Florence, Italy: Association for Computing Machinery. pp. 201–210. doi:10.1145/1357054.1357089. ISBN 978-1-60558-011-1.
