= Potion Design =

- Company type: Private
- Industry: Interactive design
- Founded: 2005; 21 years ago
- Headquarters: New York City
- Key people: Jared Schiffman and Phillip Tiongson
- Website: http://www.potiondesign.com/

Potion Design is a private interactive design firm located in New York City. It was founded in 2005 by Jared Schiffman and Phillip Tiongson, who had previously studied together at the MIT Media Lab. The firm's specialty is interactive kiosks, especially flat surfaces that respond to human input through a combination of light displays and overhead video cameras.

Museums for which Potion Design has created installations include the National World War I Museum in Kansas City, the Metropolitan Museum of Art in New York City, the Smithsonian Institution's National Building Museum and National Museum of American History in Washington, D.C., and the Museum of Science and Industry in Chicago.

They have also created interactive installations at bars and restaurants such as The St. Regis Hotel and the Clo Wine Bar.

== App development ==
Potion Design has done software development, mostly in the form of iPad apps. Their first major such project was the "Biblion" iPad app in 2011, for the New York Public Library, which presents an interface for viewing images, documents and text from the library's archives. Alexis Madrigal, a senior editor for The Atlantic, called Biblion "one of the slickest media consumption experiences that I've seen for the iPad."

They have also designed iPad apps for Josef Albers' 1963 book Interaction of Color (for Yale University Press), and for the works of photographer Richard Avedon (for the Richard Avedon Foundation).

== Awards and recognition ==
Potion Design has won a variety of design awards, including various American Alliance of Museums Muse Awards and Communication Arts interactive awards. They were also finalists for the National Design Awards in both 2009 and 2010. In 2010, Fast Company magazine listed Potion Design at #8 in their list of "most innovative design companies", lauding them for creating "interactive installations that get computing out of the box."
