= Bates's chip =

Bates's chip (also called a sloppy chip or fuzzy chip) is a theoretical chip proposed by MIT Media Lab's computer scientist Joseph Bates that would incorporate fuzzy logic to do calculations. The resulting calculations would be less accurate, though they would be performed significantly faster.
