= MIT Media Lab =

Research laboratory at the Massachusetts Institute of Technology

Coordinates: 42.36045°N 71.08737°W

- Established: 1985; 41 years ago
- Budget: $80 million
- Field of research: Technology, multimedia, sciences, art, design
- Directors: Jessica Rosenworcel, Tod Machover
- Location: Cambridge, Massachusetts, United States
- Affiliations: MIT School of Architecture and Planning
- Website: media.mit.edu

The MIT Media Lab is a research laboratory within the School of Architecture and Planning at the Massachusetts Institute of Technology. It is located in Cambridge, Massachusetts, United States.

== History ==
The media lab was founded in 1985 by Nicholas Negroponte and former MIT President Jerome Wiesner, and is housed in the Wiesner Building (designed by I. M. Pei), also known as Building E15. The lab has been written about in the popular press since 1988, when Stewart Brand published The Media Lab: Inventing the Future at M.I.T., and its work was a regular feature of technology journals in the 1990s. In 2009, it expanded into a second building.

Growing out of the Architecture Machine Group in the MIT School of Architecture, its research does not restrict to fixed academic disciplines but draws from technology, media, science, art, and design. As of 2014, Media lab's research groups include neurobiology, biologically inspired fabrication, socially engaging robots, emotive computing, bionics, and hyperinstruments.

The media lab came under scrutiny in 2019 due to its acceptance of donations from convicted child sex offender Jeffrey Epstein. This led to the resignation of its director, Joi Ito, and the launch of an "immediate, thorough and independent" investigation into the "extremely serious" and "deeply disturbing allegations about the engagement between individuals at the Media Lab and Jeffrey Epstein" by L. Rafael Reif, the president of MIT.

In December 2020, Dava Newman, professor of aeronautics and astronautics and former deputy administrator of NASA under President Barack Obama, was named the new director of the MIT Media Lab.

== Administration ==
The founding director of the lab was Nicholas Negroponte, who directed it until 2000. Later directors were Walter Bender (2000–2006), Frank Moss (2006–2011), and Joi Ito (2011–2019) who resigned in connection with the Jeffrey Epstein scandal. Later, Dava Newman (2021–2025) took the position as the first woman to do so.

Following Newman's departure, Jessica Rosenworcel was selected for a new role of "Executive Director", in charge of the public-facing duties, sharing responsibilities with Tod Machover, who was named "Faculty Director" to oversee the academic and research side of the lab.

As of 2014, the media lab had roughly 70 administrative and support staff members. Associate directors of the lab were Hiroshi Ishii and Andrew Lippman. Pattie Maes and Mitchel Resnick were co-heads of the program in media arts and sciences, and the lab's chief knowledge officer was Henry Holtzman.

The media lab has at times had regional branches in other parts of the world, such as Media Lab Europe and Media Lab Asia, each with their own staff and governing bodies.

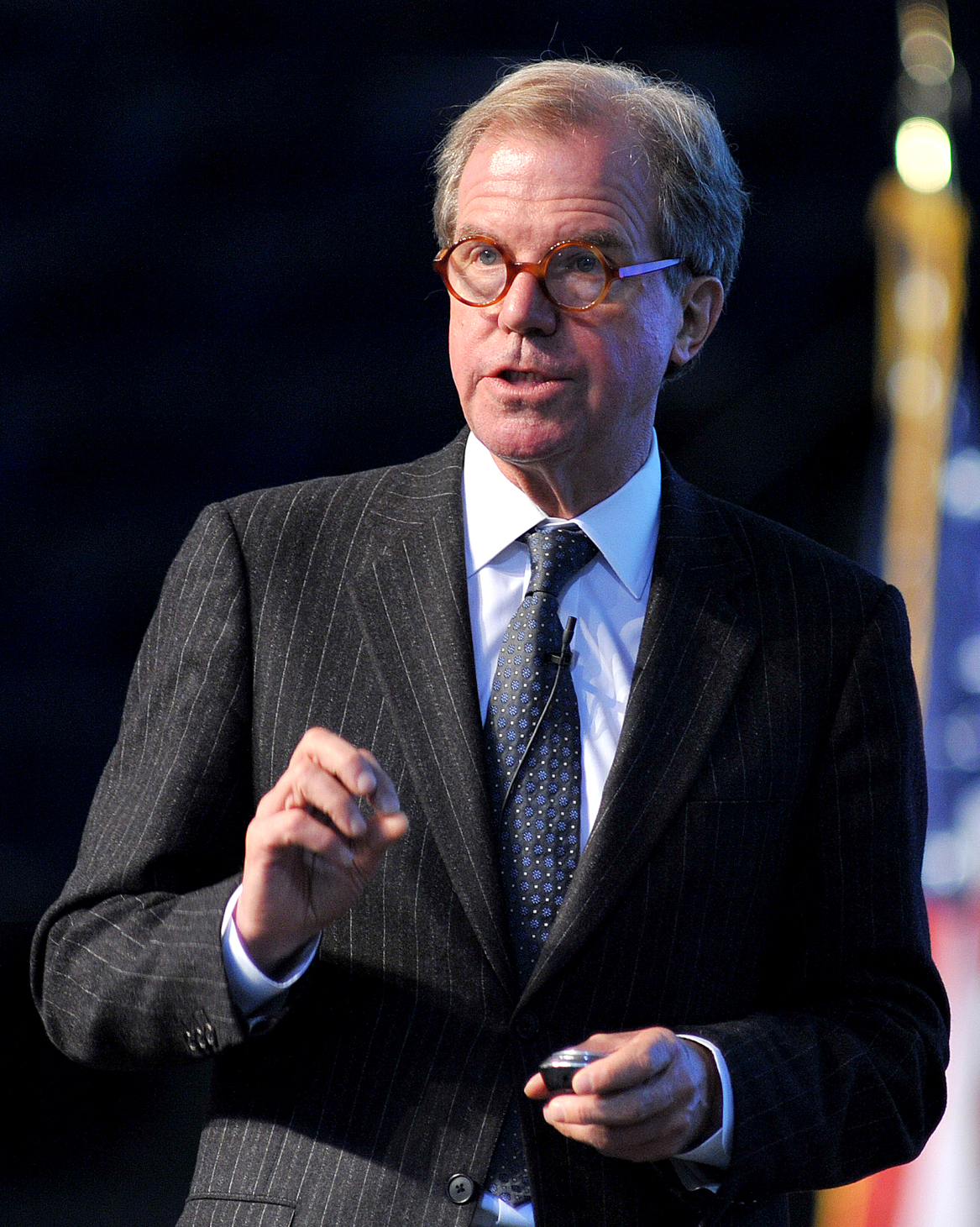
Nicholas Negroponte

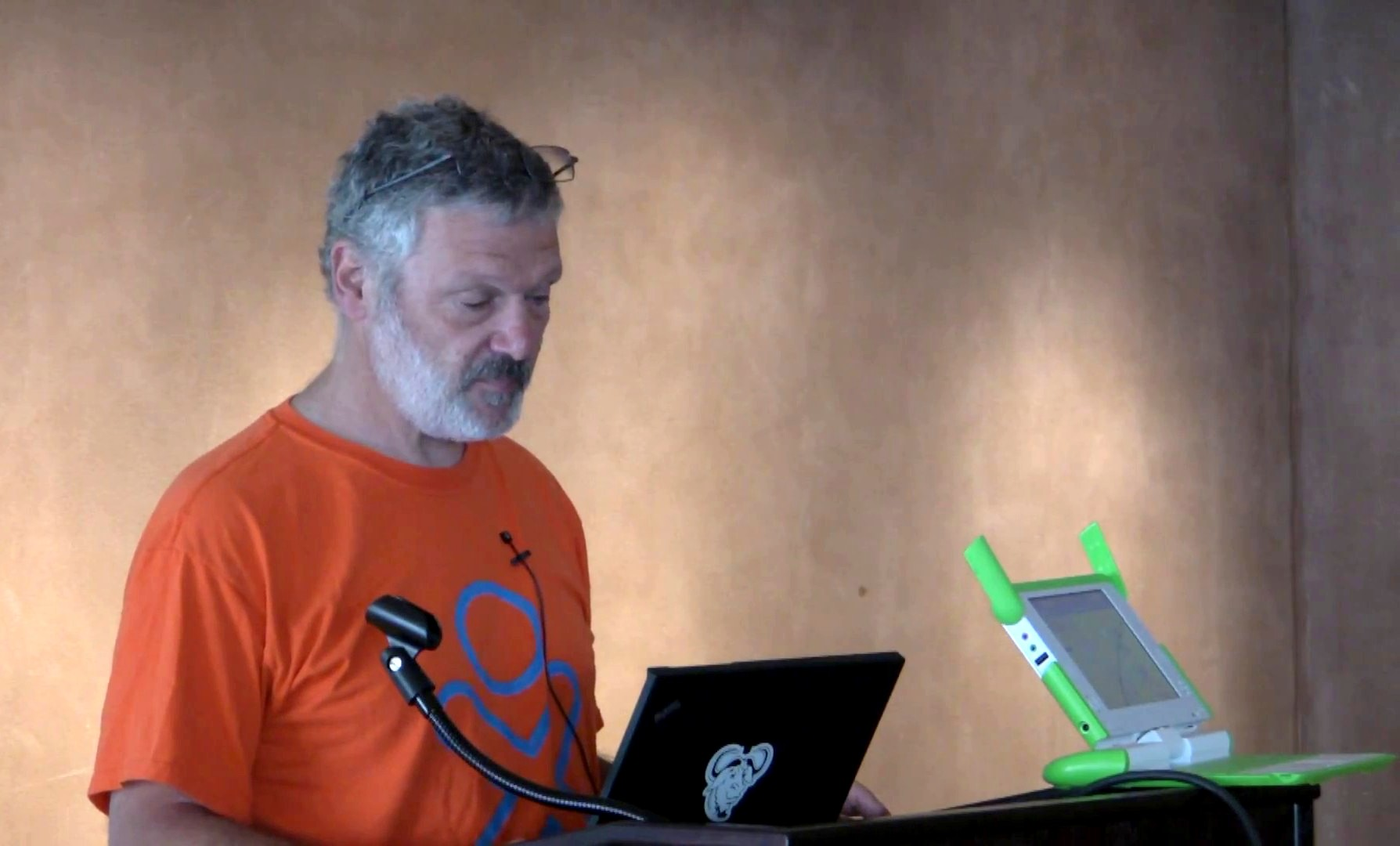
Walter Bender

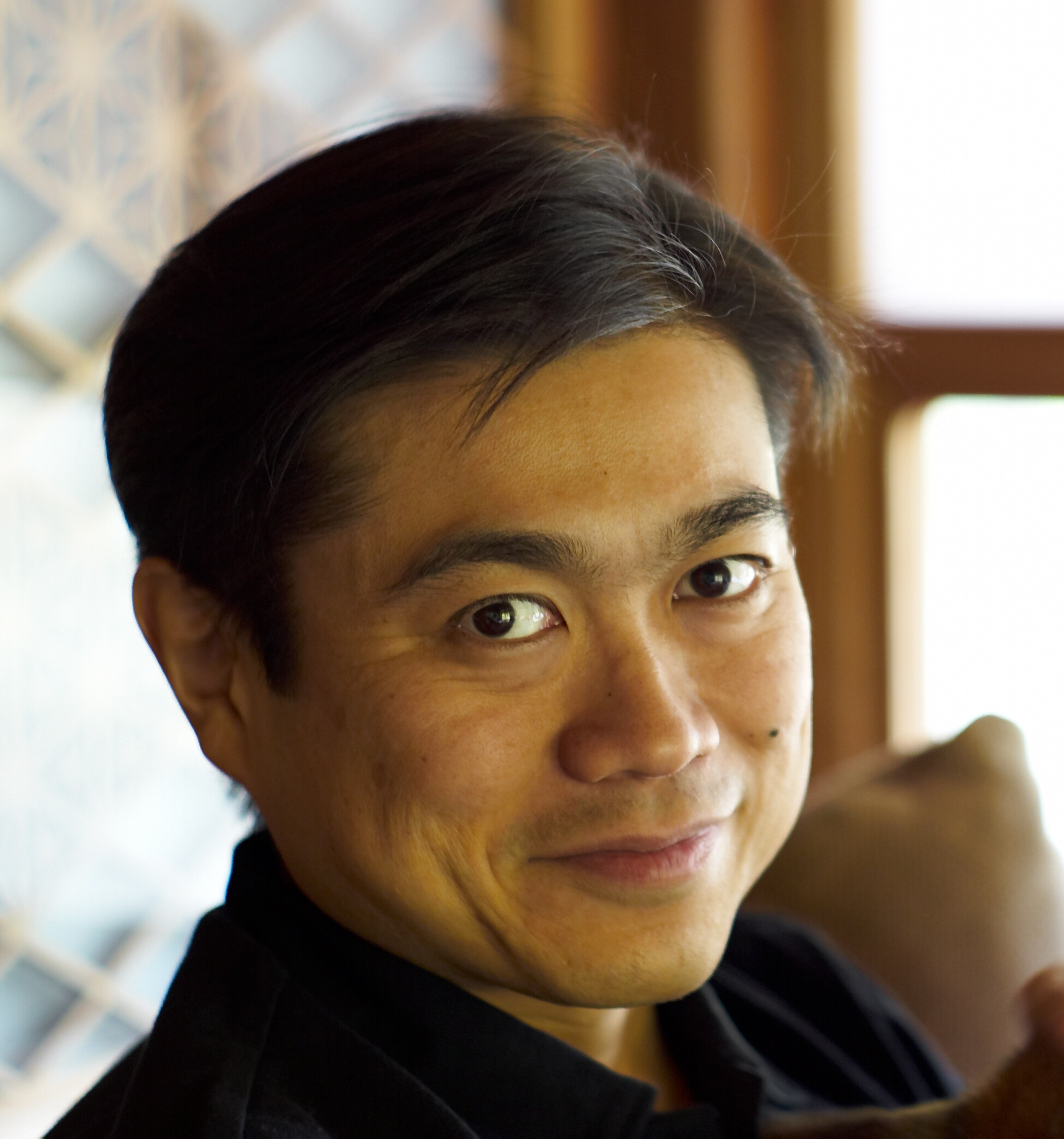
Joi Ito

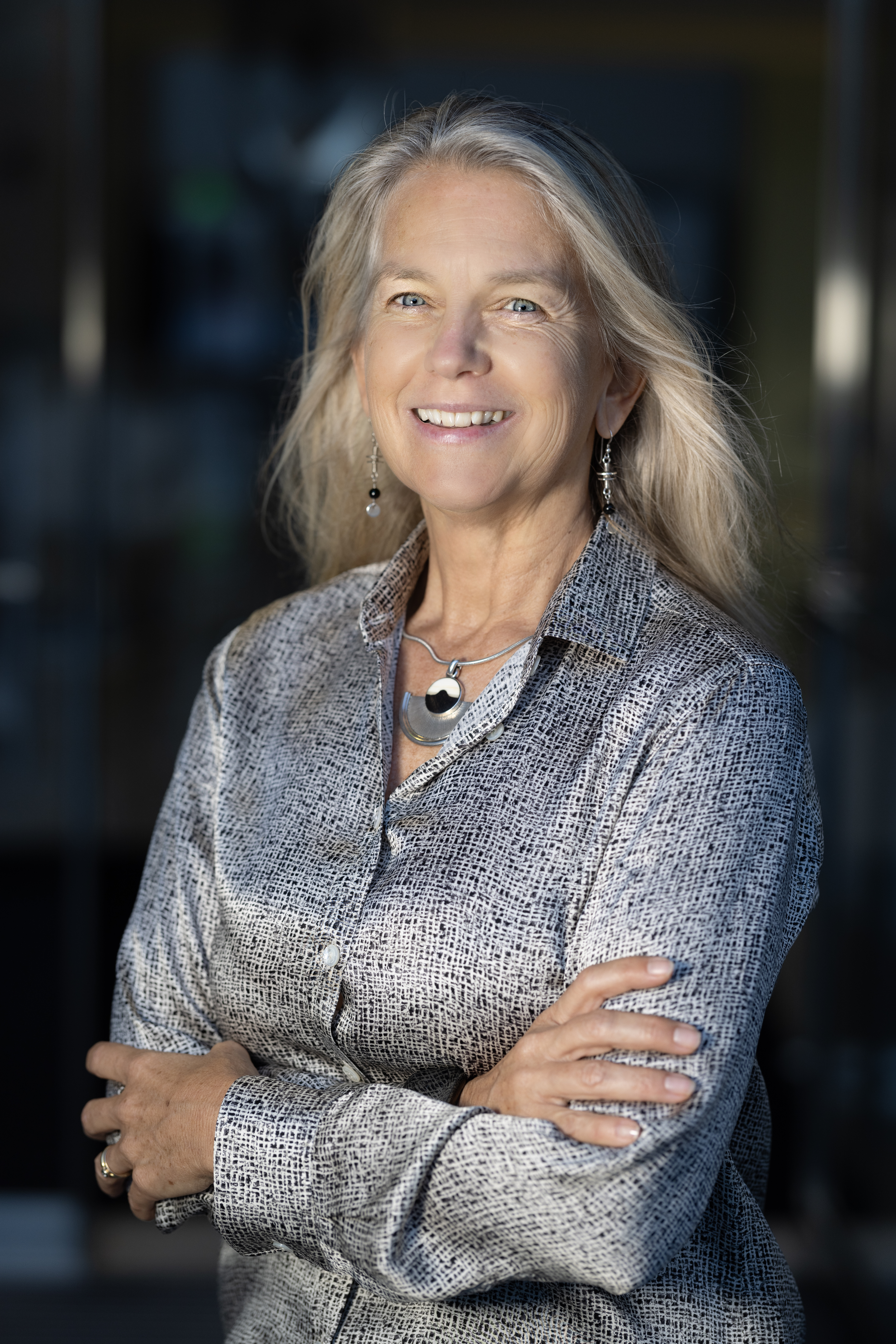
Dava Newman

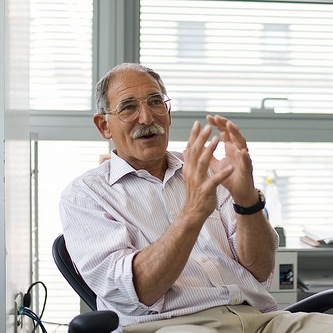
Andy Lippman

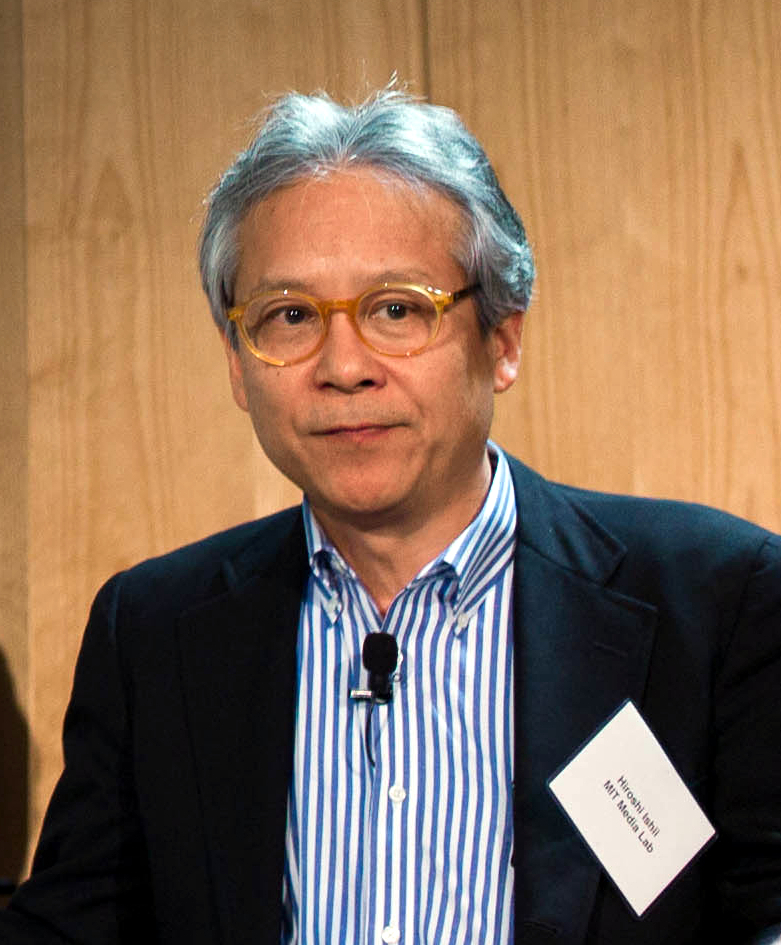
Hiroshi Ishii

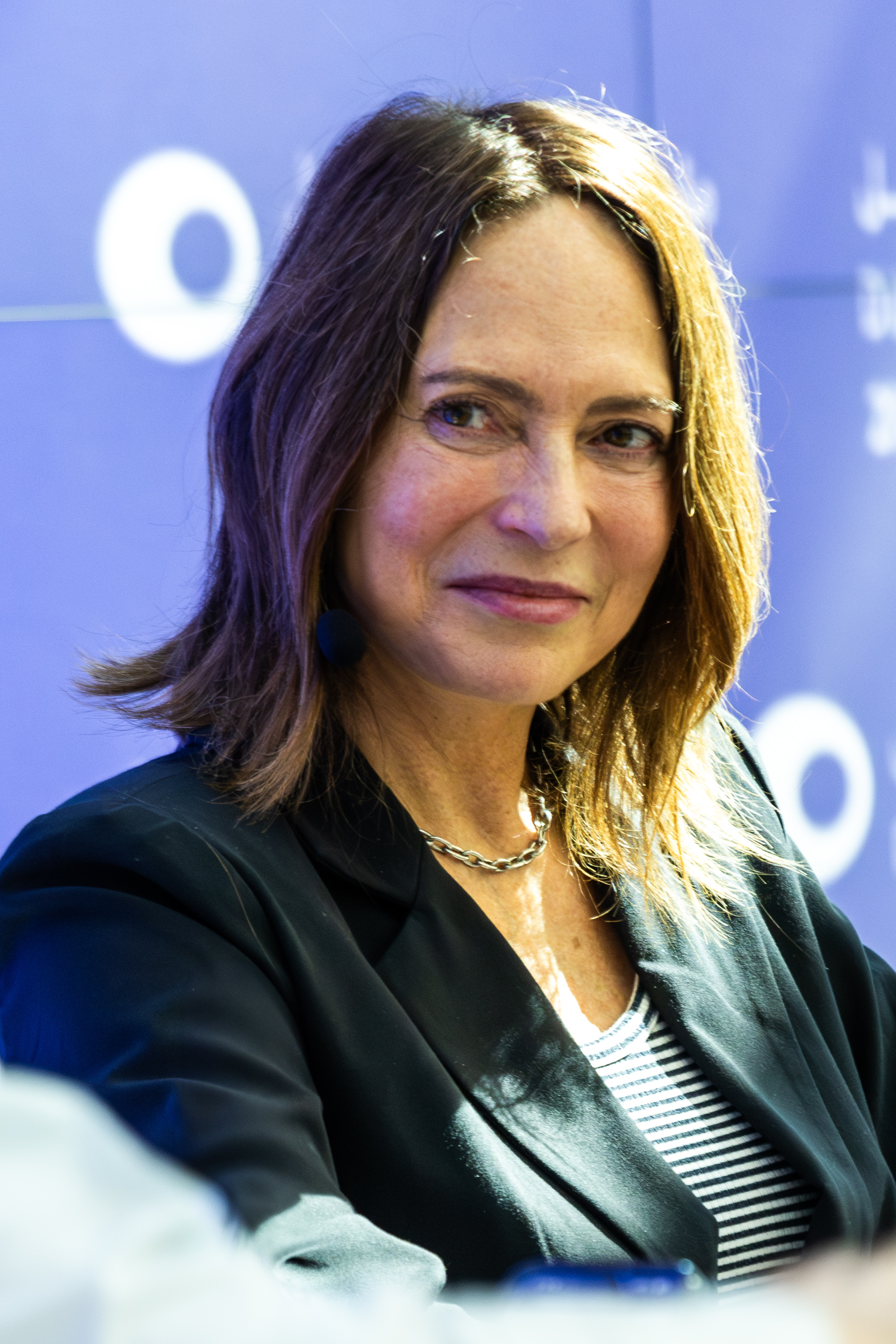
Pattie Maes

=== Funding model ===
The lab's primary funding comes from corporate sponsorship. Rather than accepting funding on a per-project or per-group basis, the lab asks sponsors to fund general themes; sponsors can then connect with media lab research. Specific projects and researchers are also funded more traditionally through US government institutions including the NIH, NSF, and DARPA. Also, consortia with other schools or other departments at MIT are often able to have money that does not enter into the common pool.

MIT Media Lab has an approximately $75 million annual operating budget.

=== Intellectual property ===
Companies sponsoring the lab can share in the lab's intellectual property without paying license fees or royalties. Non-sponsors cannot make use of media lab developments for two years after technical disclosure is made to MIT and media lab sponsors. The media lab generates approximately 20 new patents every year.

== Research at the lab ==
Some recurring themes of work at the media lab include human adaptability, human computer interaction, education and communication, artistic creation and visualization, and designing technology for the developing world. Other research focus includes machines with common sense, sociable robots, prosthetics, sensor networks, musical devices, city design, and public health. Research programs all include iterative development of prototypes which are tested and displayed for visitors.

Each of these areas of research may incorporate others. Interaction design research includes designing intelligent objects and environments. Educational research has also included integrating more computation into learning activities – including software for learning, programmable toys, and artistic or musical instruments. Examples include Lego Mindstorms, the PicoCricket, and One Laptop per Child.

The lab has over twenty research groups.

== Academic program ==
The media arts and sciences program is a part of MIT's school of architecture and planning, and includes three levels of study: a doctoral program, a master's of science program, and a program that offers an alternative to the standard MIT freshman year as well as a set of undergraduate subjects that may form the basis for a future joint major. All graduate students are fully supported (tuition plus a stipend) from the outset, normally by appointments as research assistants at the media laboratory, where they work on research programs and faculty projects, including assisting with courses. These research activities typically take up about half of a student's time in the degree program.

The media arts and sciences academic program have a close relationship with the media lab. Most media lab faculty are professors of media arts and sciences. Students who earn a degree in media arts and sciences have been predominantly in residence at the media lab, taking classes and doing research. Some students from other programs at MIT, such as mechanical engineering, or electrical engineering and computer science, do their research at the media lab, working with a media lab/Media Arts and Sciences faculty advisor, but earn their degrees (such as MEng or an MS in EECS) from other departments. Over 1,000 students apply to the MAS program and the admission is less than 5% per year.

== Buildings ==
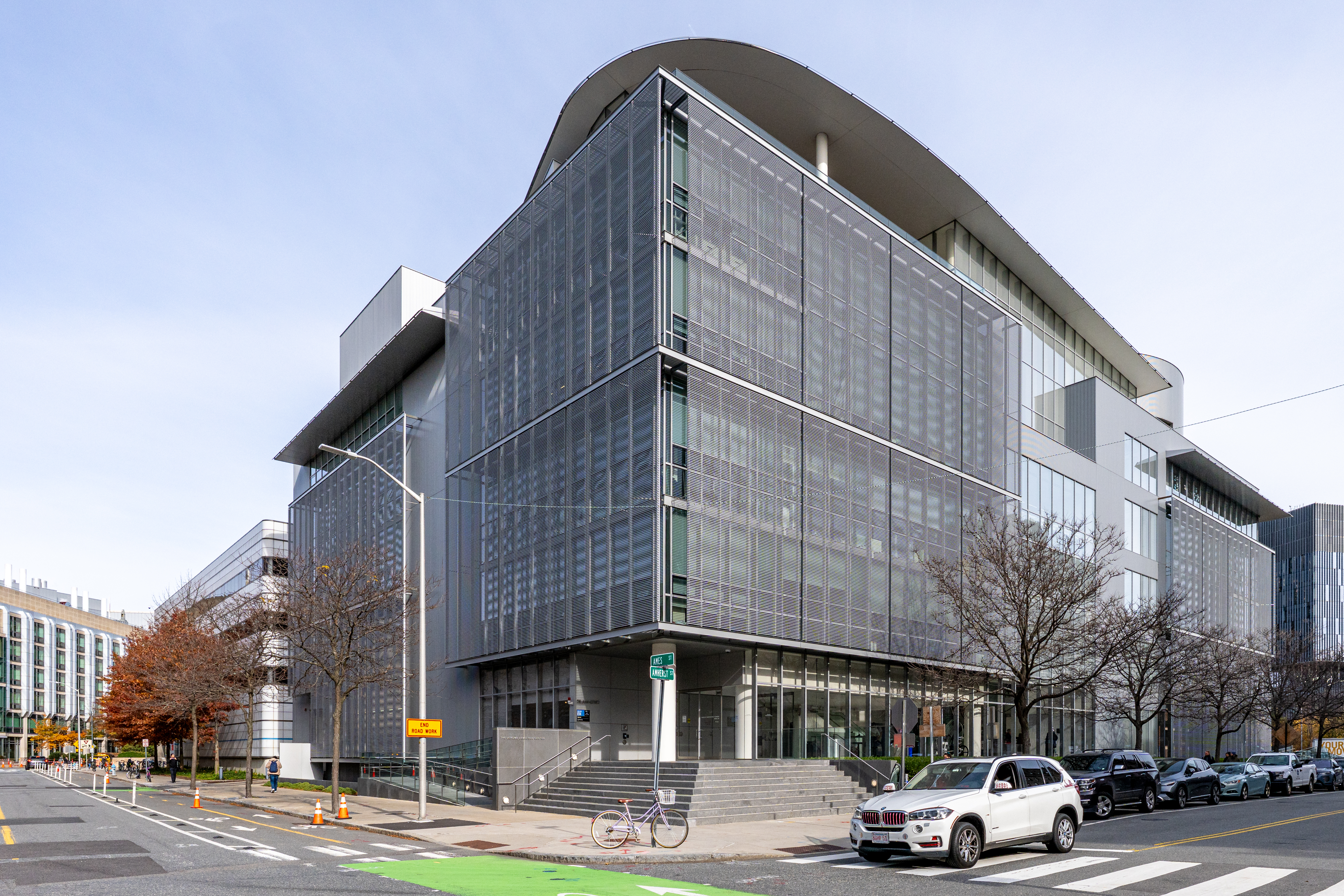
The new media lab expansion (Building E14). Original Wiesner Building (E15) is visible at left.

In addition to the media lab, the combined original Wiesner building (E15) and new (E14) buildings also host the List Visual Arts Center, the School of Architecture and Planning's Program in Art, Culture and Technology (ACT), and MIT's Program in Comparative Media Studies.

In 2009, the media lab expanded into a new building designed by Pritzker Prize-winning Japanese architect Fumihiko Maki. The local architect of record was Leers Weinzapfel Associates, of Boston. The Maki building has predominantly glass walls, with long lines of sight through the building, making ongoing research visible and encouraging connections and collaboration.

== Faculty and academic research staff ==
Media arts and sciences faculty and academic research staff are principal investigators/heads of the media lab's various research groups. They also advise media arts and sciences graduate students and mentor MIT undergraduates. "Most departments accept grad students based on their prospects for academic success; the media lab attempts to select ones that will best be able to help with some of the ongoing projects."

As of 2014, there are more than 25 faculty and academic research staff members, including a dozen named professorships. A full list of media lab faculty and academic research staff, with bios and other information, is available via the media lab website.

As of August 2019, Alex Pentland is professor of media arts and sciences, Toshiba Professor and Media Lab Entrepreneurship Program Director.

== Controversies ==
=== Connections to Jeffrey Epstein ===
In August 2019, director Joi Ito said that the organization had received funding from multimillionaire convicted child sex offender Jeffrey Epstein through foundations Epstein controlled; that Ito had visited several of Epstein's residences; and that Epstein had invested "in several of my funds which invest in tech startup companies outside of MIT". Ito later admitted to taking $525,000 in funding from Epstein for the lab. In 2019, media lab founder Nicholas Negroponte expressed support for Ito's decision to accept the funding from Epstein. Also in 2019, a federal court deposition was unsealed in which Virginia Giuffre stated that Epstein's associate directed her to have sex with former media lab professor Marvin Minsky.

In September 2019, it was revealed by emails leaked to Ronan Farrow of The New Yorker that Ito and Peter Cohen, the MIT Media Lab's director of development and strategy at the time, have worked for years to solicit anonymous donations from Epstein despite Epstein being marked as Disqualified by the university as a donor. Ito has referred to Epstein as "fascinating".

Ito resigned due to the scandal shortly after the New Yorker article. L. Rafael Reif, the president of MIT, announced an "immediate, thorough and independent" investigation to be led by an outside law firm into the "extremely serious" allegations.

On January 10, 2020, the executive committee of the MIT Corporation, the institute's governing board, released the results of Goodwin Procter's fact-finding regarding interactions between Jeffrey Epstein and the Institute. The report revealed that Epstein made 10 donations through various entities to MIT totaling $850,000, including nine donations, totaling $750,000, made after his 2008 conviction. In 2002, four years before Epstein's first arrest for a sex offense, Epstein made a $100,000 donation to MIT through a charitable foundation to support the research of Professor Marvin Minsky (former Toshiba Professor of media arts and sciences, media lab). Epstein's $100,000 donation in May 2013 was intended to be used at Joi Ito's discretion. His donations in November 2013 and in July and September 2014, totaling $300,000, were made to support research by Joscha Bach, a media lab research fellow from Germany whom Epstein introduced to Ito in 2013. Bach declined to be interviewed for Goodwin Procter's fact-finding. Epstein's other donations to the media lab between 2015 and 2017, totaling $350,000, were made to support Professor Seth Lloyd (Professor of Mechanical Engineering, $225,000), and Professor Neri Oxman (associate professor of media arts and sciences, $125,000).

Shortly after signing a petition in support of Ito, attorney and political activist Lawrence Lessig argued that the undesirable nature of donations to academic institutions from criminals like Epstein, whose fortune does not derive from their crimes, is partially mitigated if the donations are anonymous. He argues that it was "a mistake to take this money, even if anonymous," but that "if you take them, at least don't give the criminal a chance to publicly launder his reputation". "Everyone seems to treat it as if the anonymity and secrecy around Epstein's gift are a measure of some kind of moral failing," Lessig wrote. "I see it as exactly the opposite."

The Boston Globe reported it had seen emails indicating Bill Gates had donated $2.2 million to the media lab through Epstein.

=== Other funding controversies ===
On March 24, 2018, Saudi Arabian Crown Prince Mohammed bin Salman visited MIT and prompted protests. Salman's non-profit foundation MiSK was a member company of the lab until 2018. According to The New York Times, a sizable part of the annual budget of the lab comes from corporate patrons, who pay at least $250,000 each year. Prince Mohammed's personal foundation was among the roughly 90 members at their time of membership.

== Selected publications ==
Books

- Hidalgo, Cesar A. (June 2, 2015). Why Information Grows. Basic Books. p. 256. ISBN 9780465048991.
- Breazeal, Cynthia L. (May 2002). Designing Sociable Robots. MIT Press. p. 282. ISBN 9780262025102.
- Bar-Cohen, Yoseph; Breazeal, Cynthia L. (May 13, 2003). Biologically Inspired Intelligent Robots. SPIE Press. p. 406. ISBN 9780819448729.
- Ariely, Dan (2008). Predictably Irrational. HarperCollins Publishers. p. 349. ISBN 9780061353246.
- Shrobe, Howard; Shrier, David L.; Pentland, Alex (2018). New Solutions for Cybersecurity. MIT Press. p. 504.
- Moss, Frank (June 7, 2011). The Sorcerers and Their Apprentices: How the Digital Magicians of the MIT Media Lab Are Creating the Innovative Technologies That Will Transform Our Lives. Crown Business. p. 272. ISBN 9780307589101.
- Harel, Idit (August 1991). Children Designers. Ablex Publishing. ISBN 9780893917883.
- Maeda, John (August 21, 2006). The Laws of Simplicity. MIT Press. p. 128. ISBN 9780262134729.
- Maeda, John (May 7, 1999). Design by Numbers. MIT Press. p. 256. ISBN 9780262133548.
- Ito, Joi; Howe, Jeffrey (December 6, 2016). Whiplash: How to Survive Our Faster Future. Grand Central Publishing. p. 320. ISBN 9781455544592.
- Minsky, Marvin; Papert, Seymour (January 1969). Perceptrons: An Introduction to Computational Geometry. MIT Press. p. 258. ISBN 9780262130431.
- Minsky, Marvin (November 13, 2007). The Emotion Machine: Commonsense Thinking, Artificial Intelligence, and the Future of the Human Mind. Simon & Schuster. p. 400. ISBN 9780743276641.
- Minsky, Marvin (March 15, 1988). Society of Mind. Simon & Schuster. p. 336. ISBN 9780671657130.
- Resnick, Mitchel (January 10, 1997). Turtles, Termites, and Traffic Jams: Explorations in Massively Parallel Microworlds. MIT Press. p. 184. ISBN 9780262680936.
- Gershenfeld, Neil (January 12, 1999). When Things Start to Think. Henry Holt and Co. p. 225. ISBN 9780805058741.
- Negroponte, Nicholas (January 3, 1996). Being Digital. Vintage. p. 272. ISBN 9780679762904.
- Picard, Rosalind W. (July 31, 2000). Affective Computing. MIT Press. p. 306. ISBN 9780262661157.
- Papert, Seymour (April 29, 1994). The Children's Machine: Rethinking School in the Age of the Computer. Basic Books. p. 256. ISBN 9780465010639.
- Papert, Seymour (August 4, 1993). Mindstorms: Children, Computers, and Powerful Ideas. Basic Books. p. 252. ISBN 9780465046744.
- Benton, Stephen A.; Bove, V. Michael Jr. (April 2008). Holographic Imaging. Wiley. p. 288. ISBN 9780470068069.
- Resnick, Eric; Mitchel (11 July 2001). Adventures in Modeling: Exploring Complex, Dynamic Systems with StarLogo. Teachers College Press. p. 192. ISBN 9780807740828.
- Mitchell, William J. (March 9, 2007). Imagining MIT: Designing a Campus for the Twenty-First Century. MIT Press. p. 152. ISBN 9780262134798.
- Mitchell, William J. (September 17, 2004). Me++: The Cyborg Self and the Networked City. MIT Press. p. 269. ISBN 9780262633130.

== Outputs and spin-offs ==
Some media lab-developed technologies made it into products or public software packages, such as the Lego Mindstorms, LEGO WeDo and the pointing stick in IBM laptop keyboards, the Fisher-Price's Symphony Painter, the Nortel Wireless Mesh Network, the NTT Comware Sensetable, the Taito's Karaoke-on-Demand Machine. A 1994 device called the Sensor Chair used to control a musical orchestra was adapted by several car manufacturers into capacitive sensors to prevent dangerous airbag deployments.

The MPEG-4 SA project developed at the Media Lab made structured audio a practical reality and the Aspen Movie Map was the precursor to the ideas in Google Street View.

In 2001, two research centers were spun off: Media Lab Asia and Media Lab Europe. Media Lab Asia, based in India, was a result of cooperation with the Government of India but eventually broke off in 2003 after a disagreement. Media Lab Europe, based in Dublin, Ireland, was founded with a similar concept in association with Irish universities and government, and closed in January 2005.

Created collaboratively by the Computer Museum and the media lab, the Computer Clubhouse, a worldwide network of after-school learning centers, focuses on youth from underserved communities who would not otherwise have access to technological tools and activities.

Launched in 2003, Scratch is a block-based programming language and community developed for children 8–16, and used by people of all ages to learn programming. Millions of people have created Scratch projects in a wide variety of settings, including homes, schools, museums, libraries, and community centers.

In January 2005, the lab's chairman emeritus Nicholas Negroponte announced at the World Economic Forum a new research initiative to develop a $100 laptop computer. A non-profit organization, One Laptop per Child, was created to oversee the actual deployment. Dr. Mary Lou Jepsen, who had recently joined the Media Lab faculty, was recruited as CTO and technical lead. MIT did not manufacture or distribute the device, instead the non-profit partnered with many organizations and governments. At the time, laptops typically cost $2000, plus software. In the first shipping year, the OLPC laptop cost was under $200 including built-in software, sales represented 12% of the laptop market, and over time government partnerships delivered devices to over three million children world-wide.

The Synthetic Neurobiology group created reagents and devices for the analysis of brain circuits are in use by hundreds of biology labs around the world.

In 2011, Ramesh Raskar's group published their femto-photography technique, that is able to image the movement of individual light pulses.

In 2013, the Media Lab launched E14 Fund as a program to support and invest in MIT Media Lab startups. In 2017, E14 Fund launched its first seed stage venture fund to invest in the MIT Media Lab startup community. It invested in companies like Formlabs, Affectiva, Tulip Interfaces, Wise Systems, Figur8 and more.

=== Spin-offs ===
Media Lab industry spin-offs include:

- Affectiva, commercializing software that detects emotions in pictures of faces
- Ambient Devices, which produces glanceable information displays
- Dimagi, a company that develops software for healthcare in the developing world.
- E Ink, which makes electronic paper displays that power the Amazon Kindle and Barnes & Noble Nook.
- Elance
- EyeNetra, which makes eye tests as $2 clip-ons for mobile phones, including potential use to correct vision for virtual reality displays.
- First Mile Solutions, bringing communications infrastructure to rural communities
- Formlabs makes high-resolution, desktop 3D printers (spin out from Center for Bits and Atoms)
- Groundhog Technologies, global leader in mobility intelligence and its applications on geo-analytics, geo-marketing, and network optimization.
- Harmonix, game company creator of Rock Band and Guitar Hero.
- Holosonics selling "audio spotlight" speakers using sound from ultrasound technology
- Nanda, a company that markets the Clocky alarm clock
- Oblong Industries, creators of the digital screen used by Tom Cruise in Minority Report
- One Laptop per Child's XO laptop
- Physiio International, merged with Empatica; manufacturer of wearable medical sensors
- Potion Design, an interactive design firm
- RadioSherpa, an online guide for HD Radio stations. acquired by Tune-in.
- reQall, a memory aid company.
- Salient Stills, a video resolution enhancement and video forensics company founded in 1996, acquired by DAC in 2013. The combined entity has been rebranded Salient Sciences.
- Sifteo, a company that has developed a tabletop gaming platform that grew out of Siftables.
- Squid Labs, engineering consulting company
- Supermechanical, manufacturer of Twine, a wifi interface for various environmental sensors; and Range, a smartphone-connected thermometer
- The Echo Nest, a music intelligence platform
- Tulip Interfaces, an industrial software company founded by Natan Linder and Rony Kubat in 2012.
- Wireless 5th Dimensional Networking, Inc. (acquired in 2006), which developed the first hybrid search engine
- Zebra Imaging, a digital holographic display company

== See also ==
- Bates's chip
- Computer lab - Academic software bundles
- Digital art education
- Living lab
- Object-Based Media Group
- SixthSense (device)
- Wiesner building
