= Twine (device) =

Twine is a stand-alone device that uses sensors to detect parts of its environment and that connects to a Wi-Fi network to communicate. Rules loaded into the Twine can test for sensor conditions and, based on logic, send messages through email or SMS, make an HTTP request, or light a LED. It can act as a data logger.

The device was created by Supermechanical in the US from funding raised on Kickstarter. Their original goal was for $35,000 yet they raised $556,541 from 3,966 backers on January 3, 2012. The product successfully shipped in November 2012. As of April 5, 2016, Supermechanical no longer manufactures Twine.
