= Toio =

Video game console

toio
- Manufacturer: Sony Interactive Entertainment
- Type: Video game console
- Generation: Eighth
- Released: JP: March 20, 2019; CHN: September 25, 2021
- Introductory price: JP¥16,980
- Storage: Flash memory
- Input: toio ring: Motion sensing (three-axis accelerometer, three-axis gyroscope); 5 Digital buttons (1, 2, 3, 4, direction key)
- Connectivity: Bluetooth

toio is an educational video game console developed by Sony Interactive Entertainment. It consists of two miniature robots, a docking station with a monochrome display, a cartridge port to load software onto, and two controllers. After shipping to crowdfunding backers in January 2018, the platform was released across Japan in March 2019.

== Development ==
The product was conceived by Alexis André, based out of Sony Computer Science Laboratories' Tokyo division. It was unveiled at the Tokyo Toy Show and was put up for pre-order on Sony Corporation's First Flight crowdfunding platform in June 2017. Bandai, LEGO and Sony Music were announced as partners in development and content creation. In late 2017, Sony Interactive Entertainment took over the project as it offered a challenge beyond the television. Backers began receiving toio in January 2018.

Shortly after the project shifted to the gaming division, the hardware and software was significantly redesigned to improve stability. Sony offered the revised version of toio to those who crowdfunded the original at no additional cost. This version began being sold to the general public in Japan on March 20, 2019. Sony made the platform open source and released a GitHub repository on June 13, 2019. On September 30, 2020, Sony and Morikatron released a free Unity software development kit designed for toio. The platform launched in China on September 25, 2021.

== Kits ==
Alongside the hardware itself, Sony has released a variety of themed kits that include game cartridges, additional toys for the robots and books with activities.

Game title	Release date
toio collection	March 20, 2019
Papercraft Creatures - Gesundroid	March 20, 2019
GoGo Robot Programming	March 20, 2019
toio drive	November 14, 2019
~More Fun For Everyone~ toio collection Expansion Pack	December 5, 2019
Picotons	September 10, 2020
The Phantom Thief and the Demon King's Museum	November 19, 2020
GoGo Robot Programming Advanced	July 13, 2023
toio Playground Basic	May 9, 2024
toio Playground Advanced	May 9, 2024
toio Playground Command	May 14, 2026

== Reception ==
The platform and its games have won multiple Japanese Good Design Awards between 2017 and 2020. Papercraft Creatures - Gesundroid made the Jury's Selection in the Entertainment category during the 22nd Japan Media Arts Festival in 2019. In 2020, the hardware won a Red Dot Design Award and an iF Product Design Award.
