= Rubik's Revolution =

Handheld electronic game

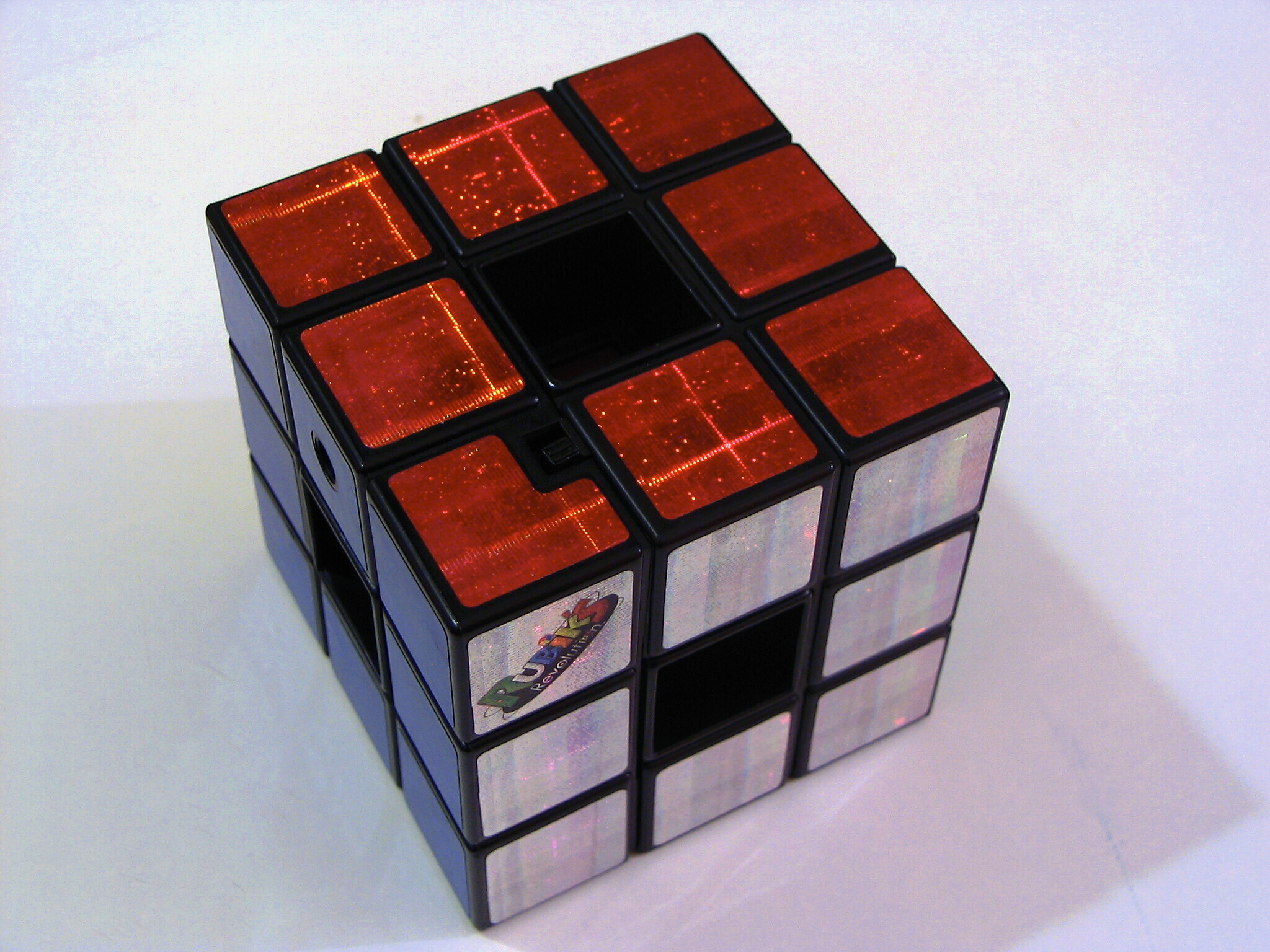
Rubik's Revolution

The Rubik's Revolution is a handheld electronic game invented, designed, developed and patented by Rehco LLC, a Chicago toy and game inventing firm. The Rubik's Revolution was formerly distributed by Techno Source and received the 2008 TOTY Game of the Year Award. 11–12 years later, it would be revamped by Techno Source's parent company, Super Impulse and be regarded as one of the many toys that would help battle boredom in the COVID-19 pandemic according to Time To Play Mag . Designed to resemble the classic Rubik's Cube puzzle, the device is a single rigid cube; it is about as large as a Professor's Cube, with each face subdivided into 9 square sub-faces. The center square of each face features a recessed LED-lit button colored to correspond with the stickers on the remaining squares. Gameplay involves pressing the buttons when they light up, or when directed to by the game's recorded voice.

This gameplay is completely different from that of the Rubik's Cube, despite the physical resemblance to the Rubik's Cube's solved state. There are no separate, movable sub-cubes as with the Rubik's Cube; the 6 faces are of uniform, unchanging color, and the 9 facets on each face are fixed in place.

== Features ==
Startup audio listing games. (2007 Version)

The Rubik's Revolution 15 includes 6 electronic games. Using the 6 lighted buttons in the recessed squares at the center of each face of the cube and the internal speaker. These games are called "Light Speed", "Rapid Recharge", "Pattern Panic", "Cube Catcher", "Multiplayer Madness", and "Code Cracker". A secret seventh mode is accessible by studying the instruction manual, referred to only as the "ultimate cube challenge" by the manual. There is also a Titanium Edition, an Ice Edition, a Micro Edition and the Super Impulse 2019 Reboot. The Titanium comes equipped with a memory system that keeps track of scores. The Ice Edition also keeps track of score but also tracks progress. The Micro Edition is a keychain-style cube on which only a shorter version of Light Speed can be played.

An electronic voice is used to guide the players both during game play and for configuration, such as changing the volume, which is done by pressing the Yellow & Silver squares when turning on the game. The games also employ various other sound effects, such as a "ding" sound when a button is pressed.

=== Light Speed (blue) ===
One button will light up, and the player has a certain amount of time to press the correct button. As the player makes progress, the player has less time to press the correct button. The game ends if the player presses the wrong button, runs out of time, or beats the game with the maximum score of 999 (20 minutes). The Titanium version of Light Speed allows scores of over 2,384 points (over an hour's worth of game play). The Ice Edition allows scores of over 9,999 points (which is 7,615 more points than the Titanium Edition). The Micro Edition has a maximum score of 99 and, unlike the other editions, has a ranking system for how well a person plays.

=== Rapid Recharge (yellow (2007 versions), silver (2019 Super Impulse Version)) ===
Buttons will randomly light up for a short period of time. When a button has been lit for a certain amount of time, it will start flashing and a warning alarm will sound. The player must rapidly press that button to "recharge" it. The player wins if they can simultaneously charge every button. The game ends when the player fails to recharge any of the buttons in time, or beats the game. This game was renamed "Full Charge" on the 2019 SuperImpulse Edition and adds in a new mechanic; it will also use a timer to tell the player how much time he has to recharge the button before the warning alarm goes off.

=== Pattern Panic (green) ===
A sequence of buttons light up and their colors are spoken, starting with one button on the first round, two on the next, etc. The player has five seconds to correctly press the same sequence of buttons. After a few rounds, the next level is unlocked. The game ends if the player presses the wrong button or runs out of time, or beats the game.

=== Cube Catcher (silver, 2007) ===
Various buttons light up randomly. The player has thirty seconds to press as many correct buttons as possible. Time warnings are given at 30, 25, 20, 15, and 10 seconds, with a five-second countdown from 5 to 1. After time runs out, the player's accuracy is assigned a percentage rating, with 70% or more meaning next level is unlocked. This game mode was removed from the Super Impulse 2019 version of Rubik's Revolution and replaced with the revamped version of Rapid Recharge, Full Charge.

=== Multiplayer Madness (red) ===
"Multiplayer Madness" is the same as "Light Speed", but for multiple players. The cube is passed between players. When a player cannot press the button in time or presses the wrong button, that player is eliminated and the next level is unlocked. At the end, one player wins.

=== Code Cracker (orange, 2007) ===
The player must try to guess the order in which the buttons should be pressed. If a wrong button is pressed, an alarm sounds and the player must begin again. Once the "code" is "cracked", the player is told how long it took and how many tries it took. This game was removed from the 2019-2020 Super Impulse version of Rubik's Revolution and replaced with "Sounds Out".

=== Ultimate Cube Challenge ===
If the red, silver, and green colors are being pressed at the same time while the cube is being turned on, the cube's speakers will tell you "You've unlocked the Ultimate Cube Challenge." To complete the game, you have to turn off all lit up lights. Afterwards, the cube will say how long you took, and your fastest completion.

=== Sounds Out (orange, Super Impulse 2019 Reboot) ===
Sounds Out is the replacement game for Code Cracker in the 2019 Super Impulse Reboot of Rubik's Revolution. Each button will play a sound and you have to press the light with the loudest sound to turn it off. Repeat the process for each sound in a descending volume level order until all sounds are gone.

=== Light Speed Prime (Yellow, Super Impulse 2019 Version) ===
Light Speed Trainer is a game mode introduced in the 2019 Super Impulse Reboot of Rubik's Revolution and works the same way as light speed but with a twist. Two buttons will light up and the player can press either one to advance.
