= Rao Machiraju =

Indian-American scientist and business executive

Nagabhushan "Rao" Machiraju
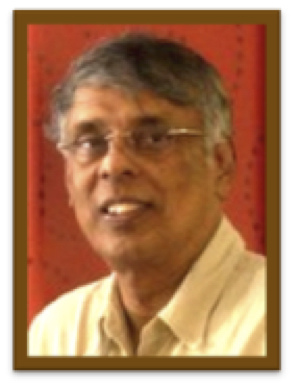
- Born: Nagabhushan Machiraju
- Education: California State University, Northridge, United Nations Institute for Training and Research, Stockholm University, UCLA, University of Southern California
- Occupations: scientist, business executive
- Known for: interdisciplinary work in information retrieval, co-founding tech companies, 10 patents

Nagabhushan "Rao" Machiraju is an American scientist and business executive, and holds 10 patents in information retrieval.

== Background and career ==
He has an interdisciplinary educational background: Masters in Public Health (M.P.H. from California State University, Northridge), he studied General Systems and Information Networks under James Grier Miller and Kjell Samuelson (Certificate from United Nations Institute for Training and Research, Stockholm University and UCLA), and Ed.D in Instructional Technology'(Doctorate from University of Southern California). He was an Executive in Residence and co-director of Center for Human Applied Reasoning and the Internet of Things, (Chariot) at the University of Southern California. Formerly he was a co-founder and the CEO of reQall Inc., an MIT Media Lab spin off, a former advisor to Dimagi with Sandy Pentland, and a NASA Research Partner. He is also the co-founder of Magically Inc., N. Rao Machiraju, was a principal scientist at Apple Inc., heading various groups including The Advanced Technology Group (ATG) Learning Communities Laboratory. Rao and his team have won the 1993 Optimas Award for Innovation and Excellence for Apple Inc. Rao also was a co-founder of Magically Inc and ConceptLabs.

Rao worked on a number of research and development efforts in information retrieval, organizational memory, wrote a number of articles and also lectured extensively. In 1996, the term "location sense" was coined by Rao Machiraju to refer to a capability of a device that can ascertain its location. Rao was also on the editorial boards of Journal of Expert Systems and Journal of Telematics and Informatics as a founding member. He was also on the Board of Councilors of National Science Foundation Engineering Research Center on Multi-Media Computing in (Integrated Media Systems Center) at the University of Southern California, and served on the advisory board of Dimagi.com, an MIT Medialab spin off. Rao also served as Chief Mentor for Ventura Technology Incubator. He was also a faculty member at USC. He is also a founding board member of the Don Norman Award.

== Research and publications ==
- The ATG Learning Communities Laboratory – An Overview by N.Rao Machiraju.
- Apple's Education Research Agenda by N. Rao Machiraju.
- A study of the usage of an international computer communications network: its implications for distance education.
- Handheld computers for Rural Healthcare: Experiences in a Large Scale Implementation.
- Microcomputer-based informatics: some training considerations.
- Telematics and Informatics: An International Journal on Telecommunications & Information Technology.
- International informatics access '87.
