= ReQall =

reQall

- Screenshot reQall 2.0
- Developer: reQall Inc.
- Release: January 2007
- Operating system: Cross-platform
- Available in: English
- Type: Personal information manager
- License: Freeware
- Website: www.reqall.com

reQall /ˈriːkɔːl/ debuted in 2007 as an app that intelligently organized spoken voice notes winning a DEMOgod award. Their first app was a voice-enabled personal productivity software program that integrates phone, email, text messaging and IM into a mobile memory aid. The software was available as a web-based application or as a download for the Apple iPhone, Android or the RIM BlackBerry smartphone. It was available in free and paid versions.

reQall was recognized as one of the top 25 ideas from MIT Media Lab over the past 25 years and is based on the Phd research work of Sunil Vemuri. Focused on how mobile technology could be used to help people capture their daily experiences and then efficiently catalog that information so that it could be retrieved and used at a later time.

In March 2009, the company introduced a new version of reQall that includes a patent-pending “Memory Jogger” that analyzes various aspects of the user’s current situation (time, location and upcoming calendar events) to provide a dynamically updated display of relevant to-dos and notes.

In 2014, reQall has forayed into bringing assistance to a range of devices such as Sony SmartWatch, Pebble, Toq, Google Glass, Samsung Gear and Gear Fit.

== See also ==
- vidby
- DeepL
