= PlayStation 2 online functionality =

Summary of online services for PlayStation 2

Various logos used to denote online-capable gaming on PS2 games

The PlayStation 2 home video game console has had the ability for online gaming and other Internet capabilities. Games that were online-compatible could make use of the feature using a network adapter that plugged into the system's Expansion Bay (the adapter is integrated into the hardware on later "slimline" models) and an Internet connection, which connected to one of Sony Computer Entertainment's or a third-party's network, depending on region. The last official online game server was shut down in 2016 by Square Enix; some games continue to have online functionality via unofficial fan-made servers.

== Overview ==
Instead of having a unified online service such as Xbox Live, online multiplayer on the PS2 was the responsibility of the game publisher and was run on third-party servers. However, later PS2 online games required the console to be authorized through Sony's Dynamic Network Authentication System (DNAS) before connecting to the server. Unofficial servers also exist which could be connected by setting up the DNS settings to connect to an unofficial DNS server.

Some games also allowed online gameplay using a dial-up connection (not available on all models), or LAN play by connecting two network adapters/slimline consoles together directly with an Ethernet cable or through the same router network. Most games, especially later ones, require the use of a broadband internet connection.

The company also attempted in Japan to market the console as a set-top box for other forms of entertainment using the PlayStation Broadband Navigator system.

== Services and lifetime ==
Online functionalities of the PlayStation 2 began in Japan shortly after its launch in March 2000 in the form of third-party 56k modems. In November 2000, Sun Corporation released the OnlineStation, a USB external modem with its EnjoyMagic software providing web and email to customers. In 2001, a year after the PlayStation 2's release, a third-party web browser named EGBrowser was released in April of that year for use with any compatible modem. Also in April 2001, Aiwa released a modem preloaded with software called NetFront. Sony would officially release a network adapter with broadband and a 56k modem on July 19, 2001, coinciding with the release of an official 3.5" hard disk drive as well as Final Fantasy X on the same day. Upon its release, the official network adapter came in two different form factors designed for the different models of the PlayStation 2 for that region, one for the early model's PC Card (PCMCIA) slot and the other for the later model's Expansion Bay. Later in September of that year, SquareSoft released a modem called PS2GATE to connect to its PlayOnline service. Some games such as the PlayStation 2 version of Age of Empires II can be played online using a USB modem; this game specifically also made use of a USB keyboard and mouse on the PlayStation 2. Sony Computer Entertainment (SCE) also launched the PlayStation BB service in April 2002 in Japan using a broadband internet connection. It also included a software service called Broadband Navigator which users to download PlayStation 2 software titles, download media and play music and video using RealPlayer software, and instant messaging. The broadband adapter was initially rented and included a hard disk drive, but was later made available to retail stores.

Online functionalities in North America were launched on August 27, 2002 ahead of its competitor, Microsoft, which wouldn't launch their own online service known as Xbox Live until November 15 that year. At launch, the first online games available were SCE's SOCOM U.S. Navy SEALs, Twisted Metal: Black Online, NFL GameDay 2003 and FreQuency Online, Sega's NFL 2K3, EA Sports's Madden NFL 2003, and Activision's Tony Hawk's Pro Skater 3. The network adapter costed initially US$40 and included a start-up disc and a demo disc with two playable games, Madden NFL 2003, and FreQuency Online. Sony Computer Entertainment America (SCEA) also partnered with AOL (to include the Netscape web browser, AIM chat software, email and other Internet services), RealNetworks, Macromedia (to include Flash) and Cisco. Despite the advanced take-up of broadband in the United States compared to Japan, Sony decided to still include a 56k modem for narrowband dial-up customers.

Online functionalities in Europe began to roll out in the spring of 2003. Sony Computer Entertainment Europe (SCEE) provided a service named Central Station with the setup discs that contained regular news of online services and provided a single sign-in username. Testing in Germany began on April 24; the test package included a network adapter, a hard disk drive, the Network Access Disc, a copy of SOCOM: US Navy SEALs and a USB headset. Central Station or "Network Gaming" launched on June 11 in Britain, July 2 in France, August 13 in Sweden, September in the Netherlands. Unlike in Japan or North America, online services on the PlayStation 2 in Europe required DSL broadband internet access like Xbox Live; as such, its network adapter has no 56k modem connections to it. Hardware: Online Arena was developed and released as an exclusive online-only game in Europe in 2003.

=== Discontinuation ===
In the years since, most game servers have been shut down. After ten years in operation, SCEA shut down the servers for the SOCOM games on August 31, 2012. The last official online server for the PS2, which was for Final Fantasy XI, was ultimately shut down on March 31, 2016, with the DNAS following it a couple of days later on April 4, indirectly shutting down several remaining unofficial servers, with the exception of ones that support non-DNAS PS2 titles such as Tribes: Aerial Assault and Tony Hawk's Pro Skater 3. Despite the DNAS shutdown, several fan-created servers still exist; most of them require a DNAS workaround to connect, with some exceptions such as Call of Duty 3 and Need For Speed: Underground.

== Adapter ==
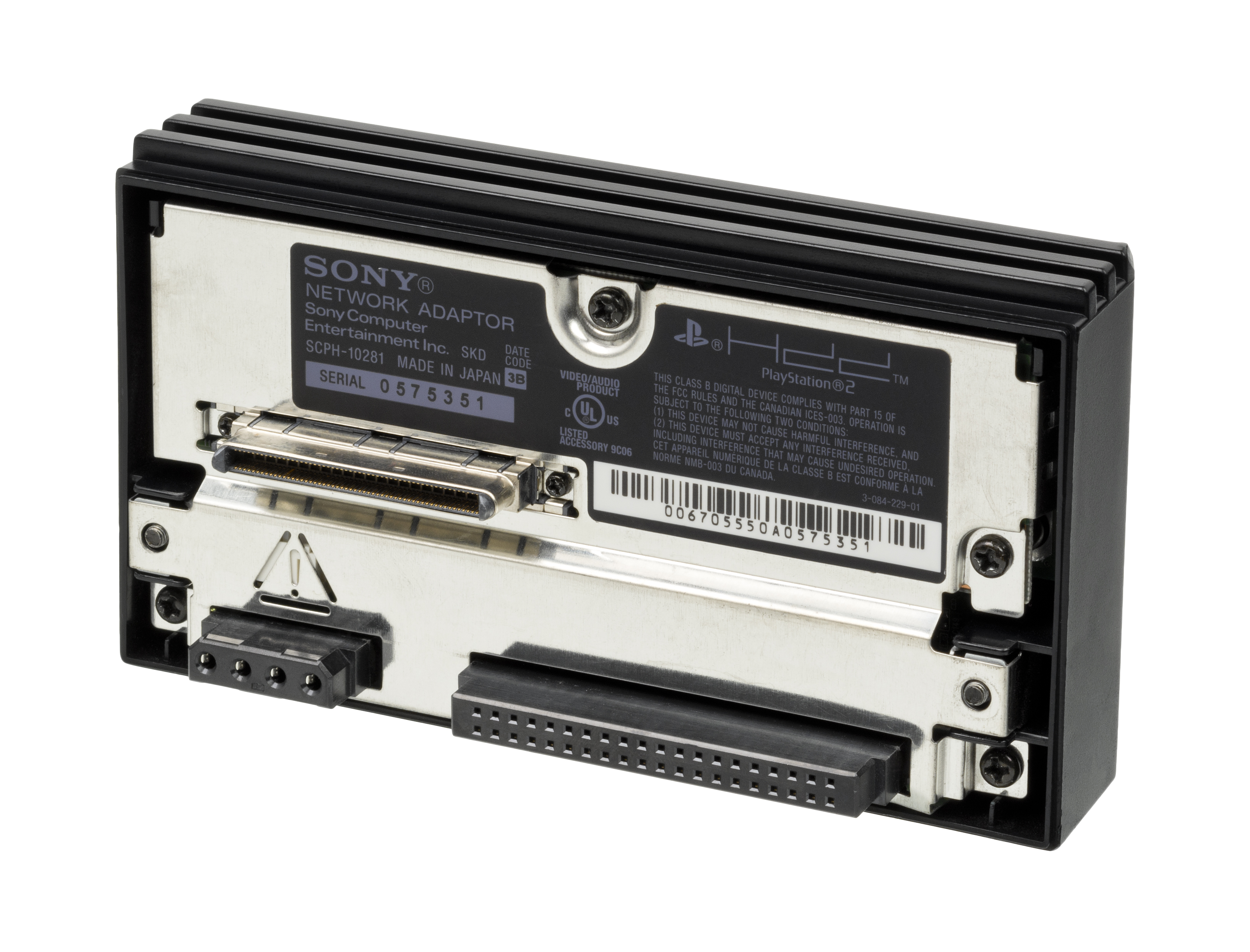
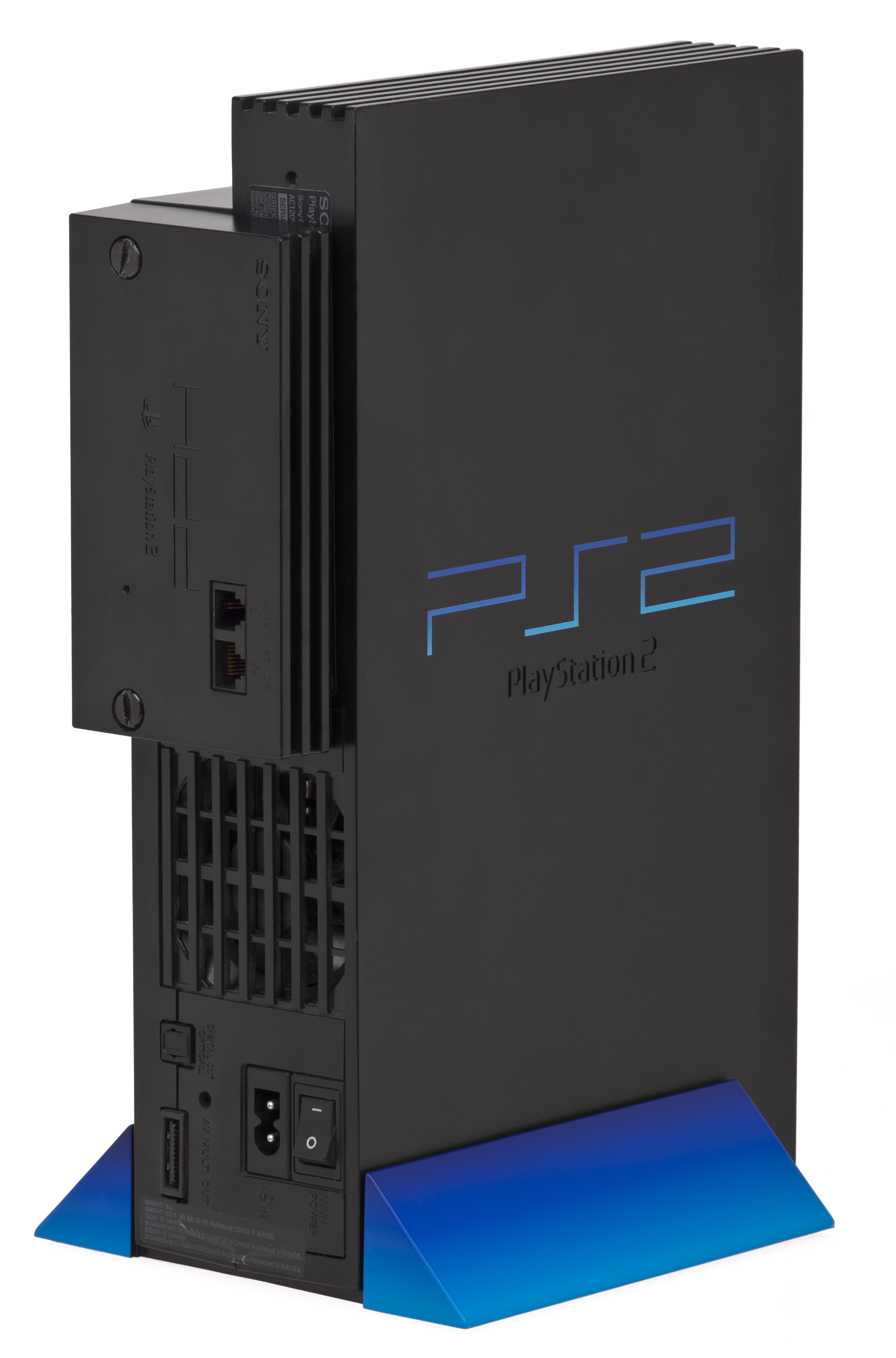
A PS2 Network Adaptor shown by itself (top) and inserted to a console (North American Dial-up/LAN/broadband version; bottom)

For the original (non-"Slimline") models of the PlayStation 2 console, a network adapter was needed to play online and use a hard drive. The initial versions released only in Japan were available in two form factors, one for the launch model PlayStation 2 systems released for that region (the SCPH-10000 to SCPH-18000 series) that utilized the PCMCIA slot on said consoles and the other that used a different form factor and was designed for the PlayStation 2's Expansion Bay that appeared on later revisions of the original PlayStation 2 models (the SCPH-3000x to SCPH-500xx series). The network adapter models released in North America and Europe use the model designed for the Expansion Bay as those consoles released in those regions include the bay in place of the PCMCIA slot found in early Japan-only units.

All versions of the Network Adaptor provide an Ethernet port, while some versions (especially some Japanese and most North American ones) also featured a phone-line port for dial-up connection. The newer slimline versions, however, have an Ethernet port (and in some early North American models, a phone-line port) built into them, making the Network Adaptor unnecessary and hard drive use nearly impossible, as well as ruling out any need to keep the network adapter in production.

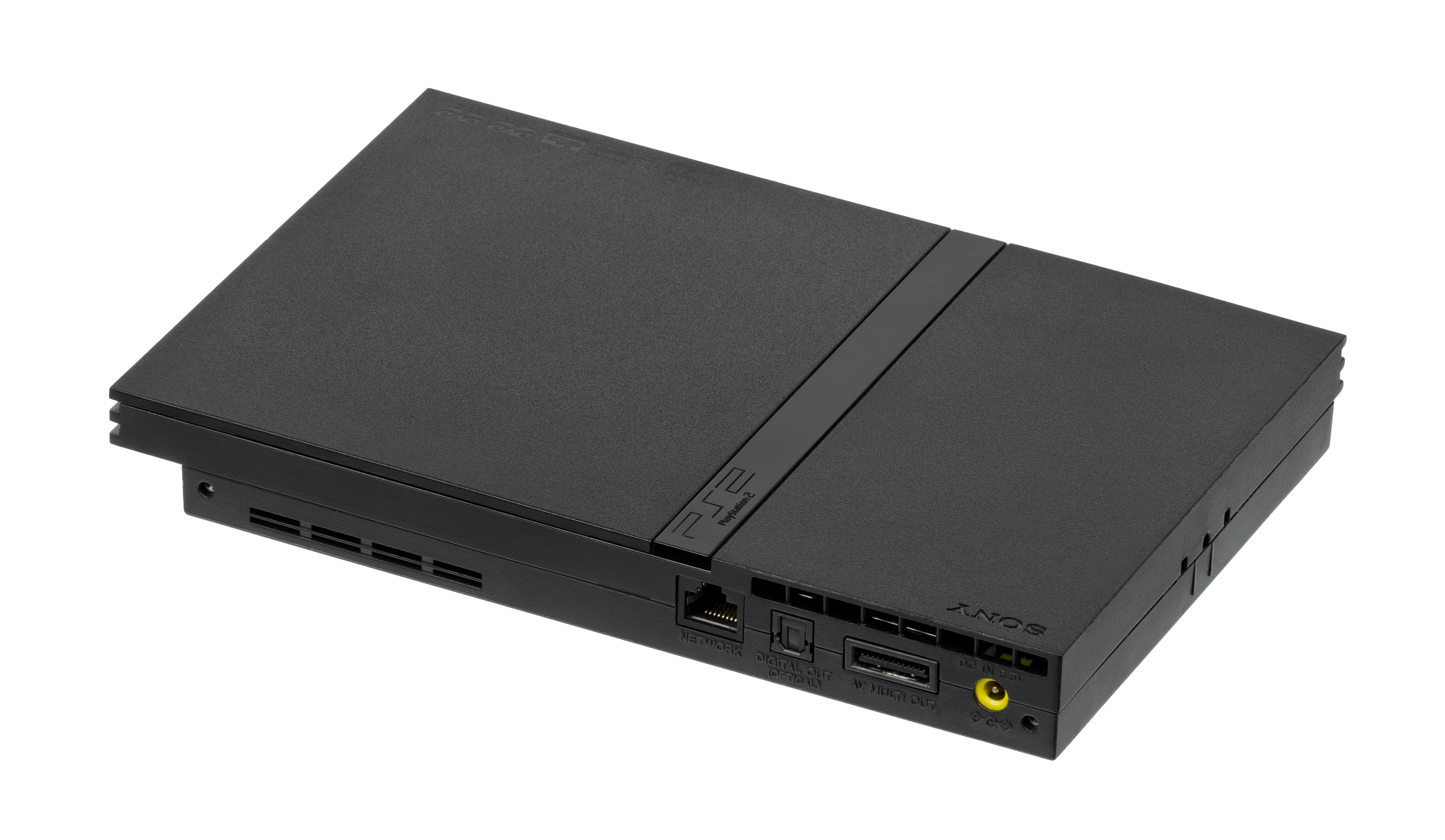
Slim model with network adapter embedded

Playing online games requires that users set up the system's network connection configuration, which is saved to a memory card. This can be done with the Network Startup Disc that came with the network adapter or using one of the many games that had the utility built into them, such as Resident Evil Outbreak, to set up the network settings. The new slimline PlayStation 2 came with a disc in the box by default. The last version of the disc was Network Startup Disc 5.0, which was included with the newer SCPH-90004 model released in 2009.

== Compatible games ==
This logo was shown on the covers of the early online PS2 games in North America that supported a dial-up connection.

Logo shown on early HDD-supporting games in Japan

Capcom vs. SNK 2 was the first ever video game to offer cross-platform play between two competing video game consoles, followed in 2002 by Final Fantasy XI which allowed connections between the PlayStation 2 and personal computers. SOCOM U.S. Navy SEALs, released in August of the same year, was one of the first video games that allowed voice chat on a console.

'With Net Play' on PAL covers

PAL games that supported online gaming display a banner on the cover near the top stating (in English-language releases): WITH NETWORK PLAY (later WITH NET PLAY). North American games feature an "Online" icon in the lower right corner of the cover; on games that do not support dial-up connectivity, "broadband only" is also found on the logo.

=== LAN tunneling ===
Computer programs such as XBSlink, SVDL and XLink Kai also allowed users to achieve online play for some PS2 games by using a network configuration that simulates a worldwide LAN.

== See also ==
- PlayStation Network
- List of PlayStation 2 online games
