= This Is Football 2 =

2000 video game

- Developer: Team Soho
- Publisher: Sony Computer Entertainment
- Producer: Tony Racine
- Composer: Jason Page
- Series: This Is Football
- Platform: PlayStation
- Release: EU: 3 November 2000
- Genre: Sports
- Modes: Single-player, multiplayer

This Is Football 2 is a 2000 association football video game developed by Team Soho and published by Sony Computer Entertainment for the PlayStation. It was only released only in Europe. Clive Tyldesley was replaced as the English-language commentator by his fellow ITV colleague, Peter Drury. It is the successor to This is Football.

== Gameplay ==
The player takes control of a football coach, who controls a football team. The game plays as technological variation of the sport, similar to a FIFA game.

== Reception ==
Absolute PlayStation gave the game 87% and said: "Compared to last years [sic] title This Is Football 2 is a much improved game."
