= Network Gaming Service =

Network Gaming Service may directly refer to:

- The Network Gaming Service website related to Central Station (online service)

Otherwise Network Gaming Service may refer to:

== Network Gaming Services ==
=== PC Services ===
- Steam (service)
- Origin (service)
- Epic Games Store
- PlayOnline

=== Console Services ===
- Xbox network
- PlayStation Network
- Nintendo Switch Online
- Nintendo Network
- Nintendo Wi-Fi Connection (Defunct)

=== Game Streaming Services ===
- Google Stadia
- Amazon Luna
- OnLive (Defunct)
