= Hardware: Rivals =

2016 video game

- Developer: SCE Connected Content Group
- Publisher: Sony Computer Entertainment
- Engine: Unreal Engine 4
- Platform: PlayStation 4
- Release: 5 January 2016
- Genre: Vehicular combat
- Modes: Single-player, multiplayer

Hardware: Rivals was a 2016 online multiplayer vehicular combat video game developed by SCE Connected Content Group and published by Sony Computer Entertainment for the PlayStation 4. It was the successor to the 2002 PlayStation 2 game, Hardware: Online Arena.

== Gameplay ==
The game gave players the option to play in either Tanks or Fast Attack Vehicles (FAVs), collecting various special weapon pickups such as Lasers, Railguns and Rockets.

In addition to deathmatch, team deathmatch and team domination multiplayer modes, the game also featured three single-player training modes, including "Time Trial" and "Target Practice".

== Development ==
The game was first announced on 10 September 2015 and is developed by the SCE Connected Content Group, based in London.

A Public Beta for the game took place from 30 September 2015 to 19 October 2015, and was exclusive to PlayStation Plus subscribers. When the PS Events app was released as part of the PlayStation 4 system software 3.00, the Hardware: Rivals beta was one of the first titles to make in-game events available such as "4 Wheels Only", an FAV-only special event. The game was released on 5 January 2016.

An update for the game was released on 22 January 2016, which added the "Scarab" FAV and the "Barbarian" Tank to the game. The next major game update, released on 26 February 2016, added a new map, "Mojito Bay", and introduced "Ranked Play", where players had the ability to compete against each other and earn exclusive rewards by ranking up. An update released on 13 May 2016 added a new map, "Bushpig Plateau", and introduced a new team game mode called "Capture the Flag". One last major update, released on 19 August 2016, added a new map, "Eagle Ridge".

== Reception ==
Reception

Aggregate score
Aggregator	Score
Metacritic	56/100

The game was met with mixed reception upon its release. IGN awarded it a score of 5.5 out of 10, saying "There is fun to be had, but the novelty of Hardware: Rivals wears thin pretty quickly."

== Shutdown ==
Around 26 August 2021, it was announced that the game's servers would be shut down on 8 December 2021. In addition, the game had been quietly delisted from the PlayStation Store. This announcement was not shared by PlayStation's social media team, but rather via an in-game message.
