= HD Loader =

Program for the PlayStation 2

HD Loader is a program for the PlayStation 2 video game console which allows users to play games installed on the optional hard drive peripheral via PlayStation 2 Network Adaptor. The games can be copied to the hard drive from within the program, or by using a computer with image dumping software that outputs to a specific custom format.

The HD Loader software does not require an original Sony hard drive to function properly, however some drives may be impossible to attach without modifying connectors. Games may also refuse to detect the drive if it is unofficial.

== Reaction ==
Sony does not support the HD Loader mod as a violation of the Digital Millennium Copyright Act, and filed a $9 million lawsuit against France-based Divineo in October 2006 for selling PlayStation 2 modchips with HD Loader pre-configured.

== Compatibility ==
HD Loader is not 100% compatible with all PS2 games. Some incompatibilities exist because game software depends on certain peculiarities of the PS2 drive hardware. Additional incompatibilities arise from the use of dual-layer DVDs in some PS2 games, which are sometimes not parsed properly by HD Loader (incidentally, dual-layer games can only be installed from a PC but as of 0.8c it's possible to install them from HD Loader). Finally, there are intentional impediments introduced by some recent high-profile PS2 titles, such as God of War and Gran Turismo 4, to prevent them from being executed off the hard drive.

In response to the limitations of HD Loader, a number of independent programmers have developed patches which extend the functionality of HD Loader to improve game compatibility or different software entirely (e.g., OpenPS2Loader). These include a fix to improve dual-layer support, one to implement a non-aligned data buffer (which allows Gradius V to be played from the HD), one to defeat newer copy-protection measures (popularly known as the God of War fix), one to support the new "slimline" SCPH-70000 series PlayStation 2 hardware and one to implement 48-bit Logical Block Addressing (which allows HD Loader to take full advantage of hard drives larger than 137 GB; or 128 GiB, as reported by HD Loader) as of 0.7c hard drives of up to 2 Terabytes can be used.

These unofficial patches have been accumulated into the HD Loader release known as 0.8b, The unofficial HD Loader is currently at version 0.8c as of April 2007. Version 0.8c continues support for 48-bit (up to 2 Terabyte hard drives), patches for Grand Theft Auto: Liberty City Stories, Grand Theft Auto: Vice City Stories and God of War II, 3 more modes and support for installing and running dual layer games directly off the hard drive.

Some games need to be patched in order to be played with HD Loader. Another may require using tricks, such as starting the game with an older, digital controller and then switching to DualShock 2, or refuse to install. According to PS2HD.COM, the compatibility rate of patched HD Loader is around 88.2%.

Original PlayStation games are not compatible with this method.

== Version history ==
Official HD Loader is extracted and released to the internet as a retaliation to the free library files used in its creation.

0.6d - the first unofficial version that improved game compatibility.

0.7c - fix for Suikoden V, patches for 48bit HDDs (up to 2 Terabytes), DMA modes (UDMA/MDMA) and DVD9 fix to allow dual layer games to be played were added. A stable GUI Patching app was created and allowed one to choose which patches and other various edits to apply to an Official unpatched version. Updated compatibility menu added.

0.7e - patches that fixed Shadow of the Colossus and Super Monkey Ball were added. This version enabled playing many previously incompatible games. Updated compatibility menu and changed modes description.

0.8 - A patch that fixed GTA: Liberty City Stories and the ability to edit the DMA button configuration.

0.8b - fixes a bug with HDL0.8 not installing to HDDs over 128 GB and a few other minor errors. Updated compatibility menu.

0.8b+ - A patch that fixed God of War II was added. This version is known under different names because author did not rename the version. Additionally, this patch breaks support for Grand Theft Auto: Liberty City Stories.

0.8c - A fix for the buffer alignment was added into the GUI Patcher app and made both GOW2 and GTA:LCS run without crashing. This is the current version. The unofficial releases can be run on a console with a modchip installed, or by using an exploit such as Free McBoot or PS2 Independence Exploit.

=== HD Advance ===
HD Advance is a cloned version of the HD Loader software for the PlayStation 2, which allow users to play games installed to the optional hard drive peripheral available for the PS2. HD Advance is identical in functionality to many patched versions of HD Loader freely available online (that include DVD-9 support and 48-bit hard drive addressing) - only with a different theme and some changed text strings.

The only benefit of HD Advance is that it is distributed on a pressed disk, giving a patched version of HD Loader that can run on a console without a modchip installed, and also without the need of the PS2 Independence Exploit or any other software modification.

However, players who were using HD Advance 2.0 retail pressed discs (CD or DVD) to format a Maxtor hard disk with 80 GB capacity and subsequently use the disc to play PS2 games from the HDD were reported experiencing a strange problem. HD Loader versions up to 0.7c boot up perfectly via the Independence Exploit but subsequent versions of HD Loader from 0.8 onwards freezes on the splash screen and refuses to start up if formatted with a HD Advance disc. This is possibly due to newer patches that are not in any HD Advance discs;a solution is to reformat the hard disk with HD Loader version 0.8 or higher, which is recommended for newer PS2 games. However, this is not confirmed to work 100% across the board as certain PS2 models (mainly PAL 7xxx consoles) was reported to still freeze at splash screen; a currently-unfixable problem related to HD Loader version 0.8 or higher on PAL single-port network adapter models was the main problem.

=== Open PS2 Loader ===
Open PS2 Loader, abbreviated as OPL, is an open-source program that allows playing of commercial games and homebrew installed from external storage devices. It has support for the internal hard disk drive (like HD Loader), USB drives (like USB Advance), SMB (over network), i.LINK and MX4SIO. It also has additional features, like the GSM feature that is used to disable videos and change the resolution of the game output, virtual memory cards (allowing the user to save on USB, HDD, SMB, i.LINK and MX4SIO), usage of the DualShock 3 controller over USB and Bluetooth (using a dongle) and a cheat engine. The interface of Open PS2 Loader can be customized with themes. It has been developed in version control since September 27, 2009.
