= This Is Football 2002 =

2001 video game

- UK version featuring Rio Ferdinand
- Developer: Team Soho
- Publishers: EU: Sony Computer Entertainment; NA: 989 Sports
- Producer: Tony Racine
- Designers: Dominic Cahalin; Kevin Mason
- Composers: Garry Taylor; Julian Chown
- Series: This is Football
- Platform: PlayStation 2
- Release: EU: 28 September 2001; NA: 17 February 2002
- Genre: Sports
- Modes: Single-player, multiplayer

This Is Football 2002, known as World Tour Soccer 2002 in North America, is an association football video game developed by Team Soho and published by Sony Computer Entertainment for the PlayStation 2. It was released by 989 Sports in North America. The British version of the game featured the Leeds United and England national football team defender Rio Ferdinand on the cover.

== Gameplay ==
This Is Football 2002 was licensed by FIFPro. While this meant all players in the game were licensed, the teams were not, with most of them being referred to by their hometown or other indicative names, such as Arsenal and Juventus being listed in the game as "Highbury" and "Turin" respectively. The game introduced a number of features unique to football games at the time, such as being able to make players deliberately dive (a feature described at the time as controversial). It also granted players the opportunity to deliberately foul with two-footed tackles.

== Release ==
This Is Football 2002 was released in September 2001 to be the first football game released before Christmas prior to the release of the FIFA and Pro Evolution Soccer series of games.

== Reception ==
Reception

Aggregate score
Aggregator	Score
Metacritic	77/100

Review score
Publication	Score
IGN	8.1/10

This Is Football 2002 received "generally positive" reviews, according to review aggregator Metacritic.

The BBC praised This Is Football 2002 for its unique gameplay features such as the deliberate dives but stated that the tactics and AI was poor compared to the FIFA and PES series. Wales on Sunday likewise praised the detail of players and stadiums but criticized it for being similar to previous football games. IGN gave it a 8.1/10 review praising its gameplay and graphics but criticised the sound effects of the crowd. The majority of reviews put the majority of the negatives down to the developers' inexperience of making football games compared to the longer-running rival franchises. Copa90 named it as one of their top 10 football games in history.
