= PlayStation 2 Expansion Bay =

3.5" drive bay for the PlayStation 2

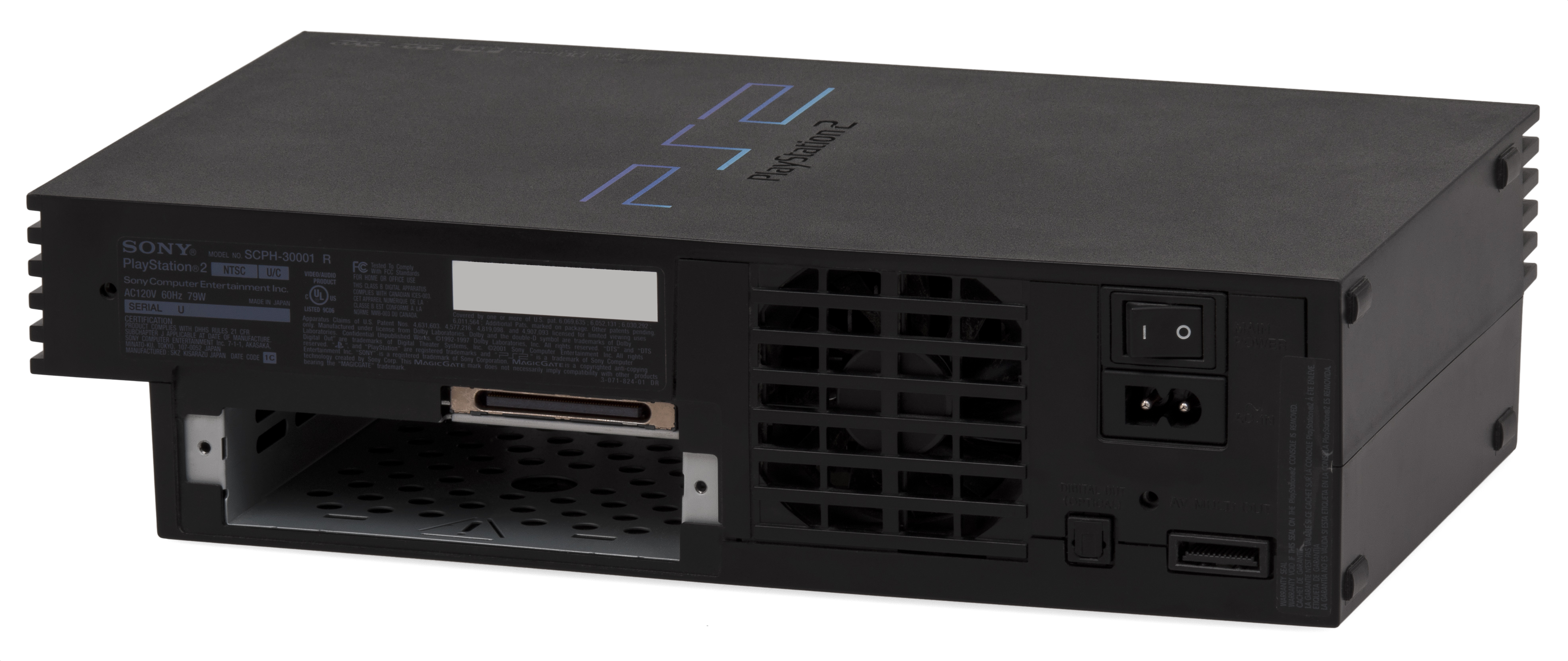
PlayStation 2 back showing Expansion Bay on SCPH-30001

The PlayStation 2 Expansion Bay is a 3.5-inch drive bay of the PlayStation 2 gaming console that was introduced with the model 30000 and 50000 (replacing the PCMCIA slot used in the models 10000, 15000 and 18000, and removed with the slimline model 70000). The bay is designed for the network adaptor and internal hard disk drive (HDD). These peripherals enhance the capabilities of the PS2 to allow online play and other features that were shown at E3 2001.

== Network Adaptor ==
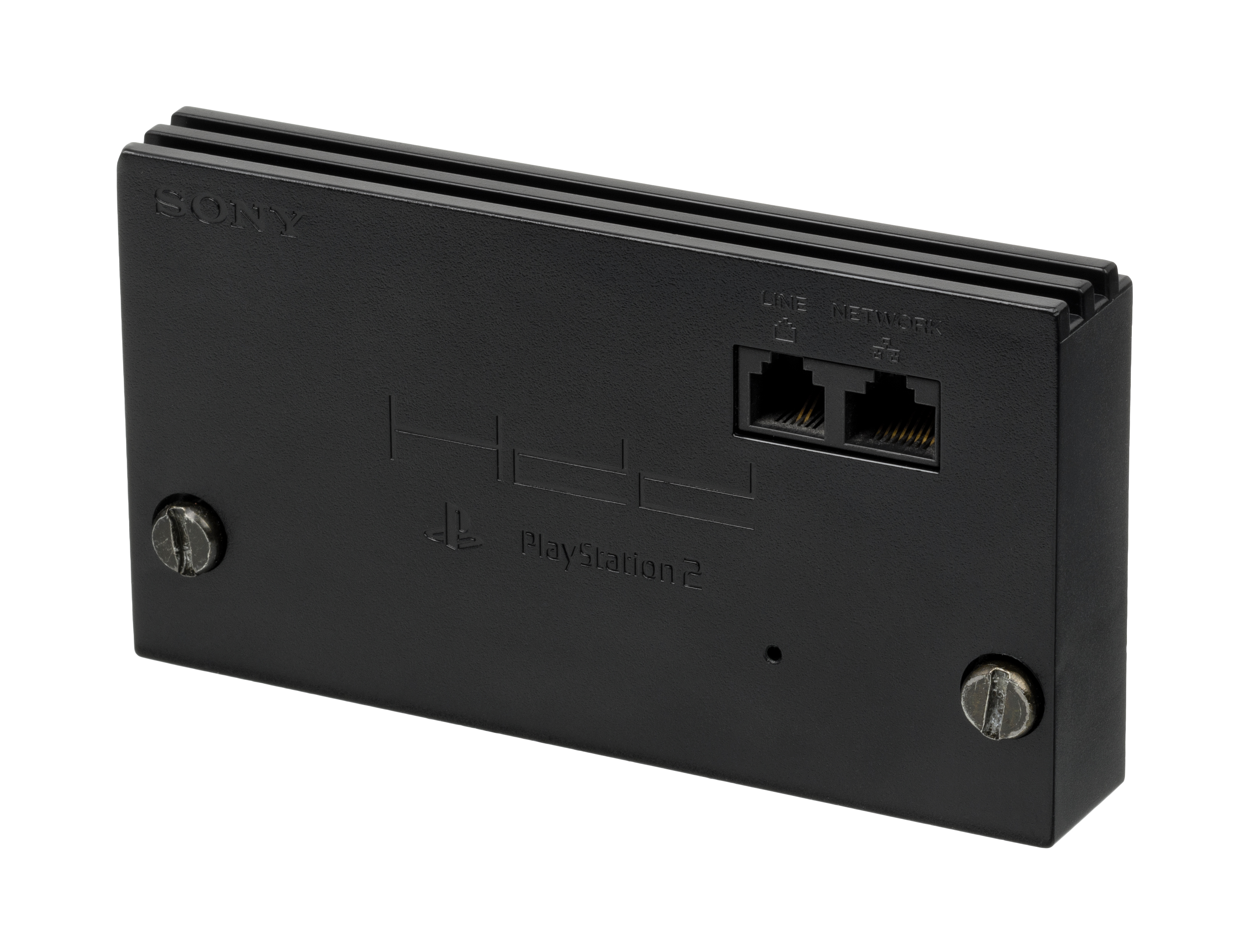
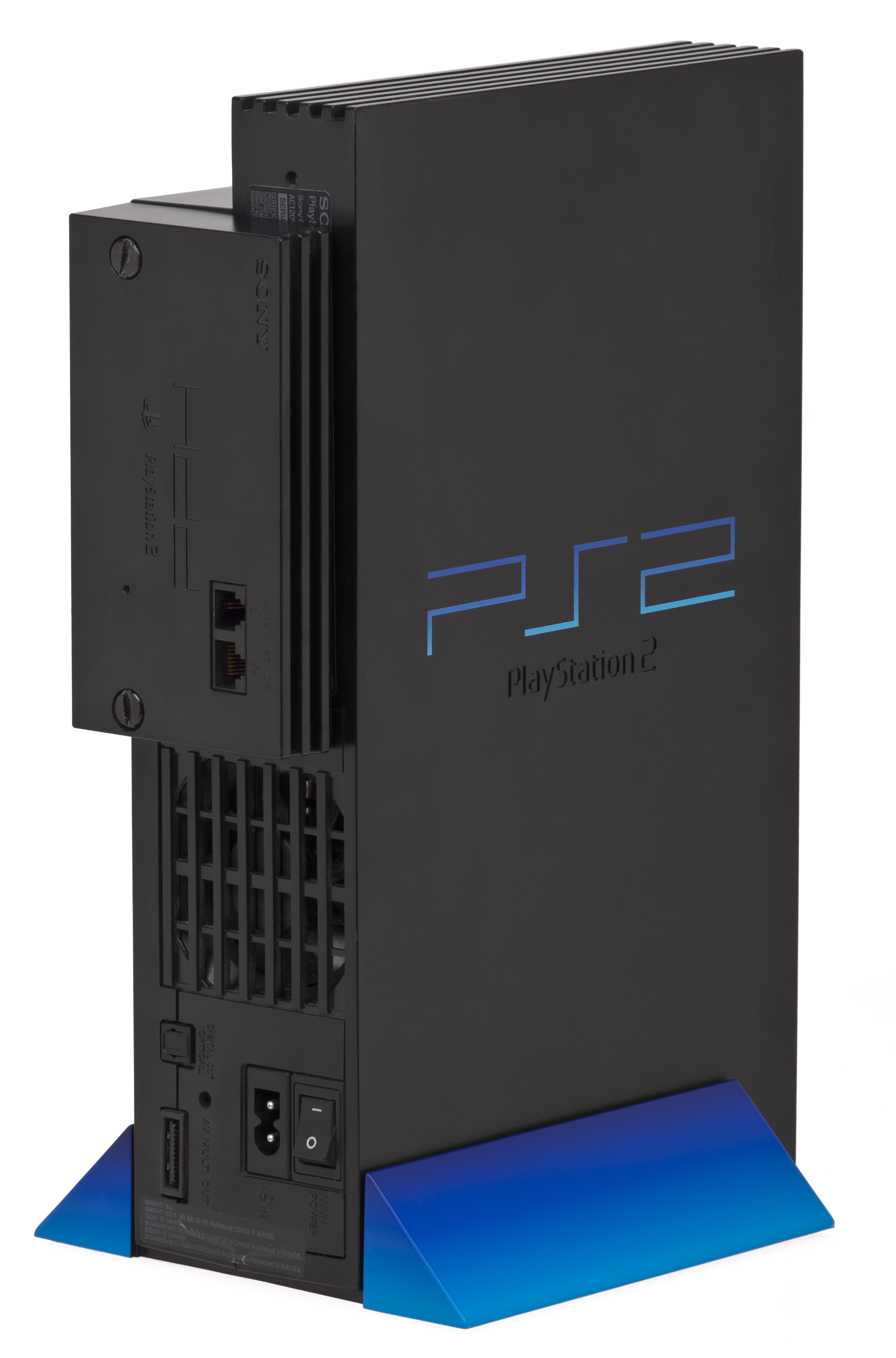
A PS2 Network Adaptor shown by itself (top) and inserted to a console (bottom)

The Network Adaptor was released together with the launch of the PlayStation 2's online play service. Two models of the adaptor were available - one with a dial-up modem and an Ethernet jack for broadband Internet connection (mainly sold in North America), and one with only an Ethernet interface (sold in Europe and other regions). A start-up disc ("Network Access Disc") is included with the Network Adaptor and installs a file on the memory card for connection settings which are accessible by all but one Network Adaptor compatible game. Tony Hawk's Pro Skater 3, released in November 2001, supported the Network Adapter hardware, but not the software as it was not finalized until much later.

The Network Adaptor also provides a Parallel ATA interface and a Molex disk drive power connector to allow installation of a 3.5" IDE hard disk drive in the expansion bay. The two disk connectors are on separate circuit boards from the main Network Adaptor one.

Slimline PlayStation 2 models have an Ethernet port built-in (with some early North American models including an analog dial-up modem), but no official hard disk drive interface. The first slimline model (SCPH-70000) has a complete Network Adapter on board and may be modified to add an external IDE connector board. From the SCPH-75000 series onwards, Ethernet functionality is integrated into the I/O processor (which was completely redesigned internally), completely removing the disk interface.

The maximum supported rate of the Network Adapter is 100 Mbit/s, at full duplex. It is backwards compatible with 10 Mbit/s hardware and configurations.

== Hard Disk Drive ==
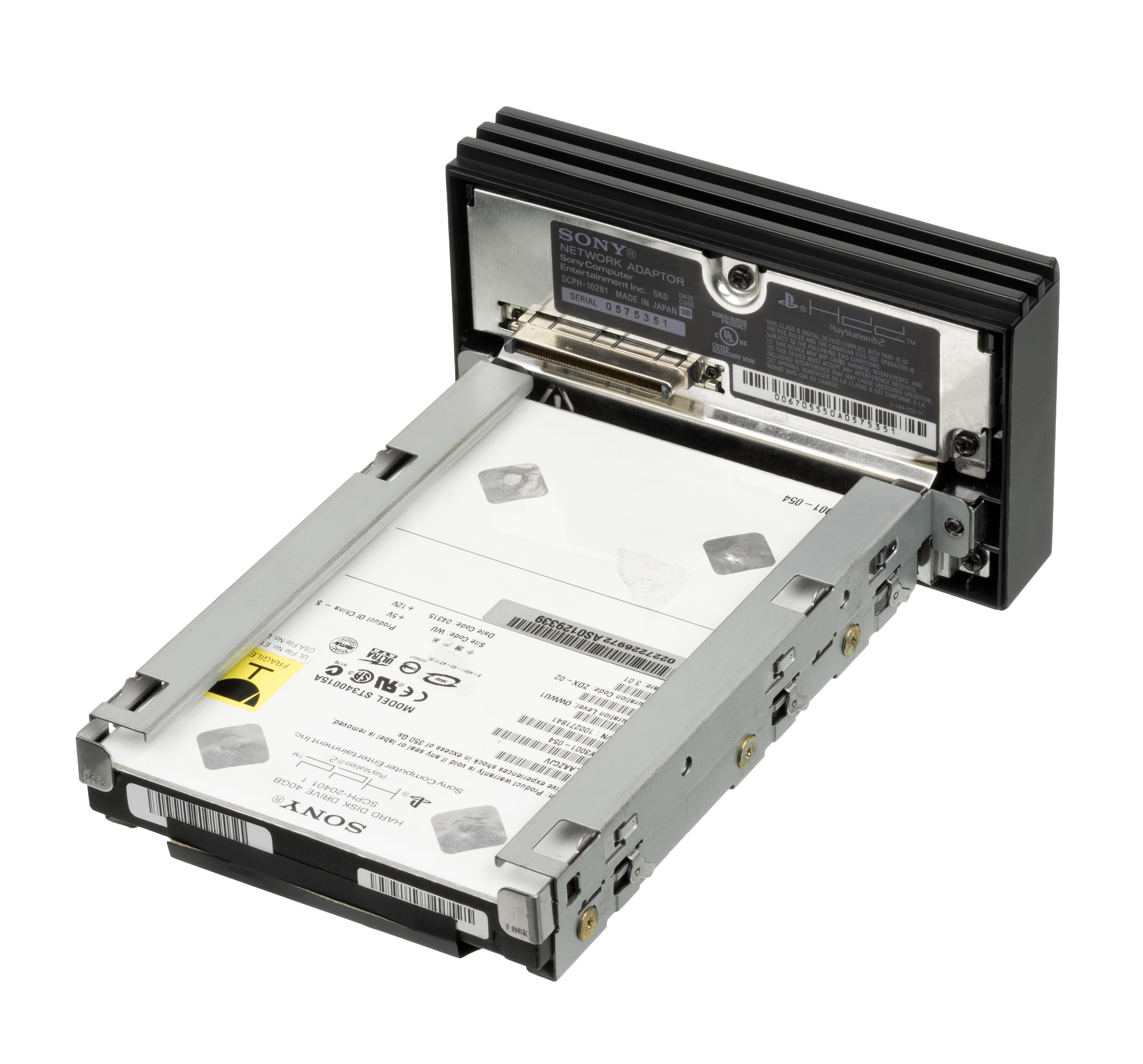
PlayStation HDD and Network Adapter

The PlayStation 2 Hard Disk Drive (PS2 HDD) was released on July 19, 2001, in Japan (together with the Network Adaptor), in Europe on May 22, 2002 (together with the Linux Kit), and in North America on March 23, 2004 (together with Final Fantasy XI). It requires the Network Adaptor to connect to the PlayStation 2 and to receive power. The HDD has a 40 GB capacity that can be used by games to reduce load time by putting data on the hard drive temporarily, installing downloadable content, or to transfer backup game save data from memory cards. IBM, Maxtor and Seagate produced hard drives used in these kits.

Due to MagicGate copyright protection, programs that are bootable directly from the HDD (e.g. PlayStation Broadband Navigator, PlayOnline Viewer, Central Station) are keyed to the system when that system installs them. The HDD can be transferred to another PlayStation 2 system and files on the HDD can be accessed, but those specific programs cannot be booted without being reinstalled. Contrary to popular belief, a complete reformat of the HDD is not necessary upon transfer of the HDD between consoles, or else it would not be useful to have the HDD be preformatted and have preinstalled software, as is the case with the North American HDD unit. An HDD Utility Disc is included to allow maintenance of the HDD (including defragmentation, disk repair and formatting utilities, along with a file manager browser) and in North America, Final Fantasy XI is also included. There are 35 North American games that support the HDD.

Unofficial software such as HD Loader (and later HD Advance and Open PS2 Loader (OPL)) allows users to copy entire games to the HDD and run them without the discs. They also allowed using some standard consumer hard drives with the PS2, however they will not be compatible with software expecting the standard PS2 hard drive. This software combined with a hard drive allows one to play games without using the original disc. This is desirable as it protects the fragile (and perhaps rare) game discs from harm, and in some cases, may improve performance. It is not without controversy, however; the aforementioned HD Loader software for example bypasses the usual copy-protection mechanisms built into the console, leading to piracy.

=== North American and European releases with HDD support ===
- ESPN NFL 2K5, NBA 2K5, ESPN College Hoops 2K5, Major League Baseball 2K5, and ESPN NHL 2K5 use the HDD to improve replays. (If the HDD is not installed, static screenshots are shown as replays. With the HDD, full cutscene-like replays can be displayed). ESPN NHL 2K5 has the ability to save files directly to the hard drive
- Final Fantasy XI is the only North American-released game truly dependent on the HDD as it requires various patches and upgrades from Square Enix.
- Metal Saga installs 1.7 GB to the HDD to decrease load time and uses the HDD to save/load game instead of Memory Card
- MLB 2K6, 2K7, 2K8, 2K9, 2K10, 2K11 and 2K12 support saving to the HDD as well as the automatic installation of data for faster loading.^{†}
- NHL 2K6, 2K7, 2K8, 2K9 and 2K10 support saving to the HDD.^{†}
- RPG Maker 3 installs 3 GB to the HDD to decrease load times.
- Resident Evil Outbreak (both, the original game and File #2) installs 1 GB to the HDD for reduced loading times.
- SOCOM 3 U.S. Navy SEALs supports additional maps, downloadable via the in game "Socom Store".
- SOCOM II U.S. Navy SEALs supports additional maps. However, the files must be copied from a magazine demo disc to the hard drive and cannot be downloaded.
- SOCOM U.S. Navy SEALs: Combined Assault supports additional maps.
- Street Fighter Alpha Anthology, like its Japanese counterpart, can install 2 GB to the HDD to reduce loading time.
- The Urbz: Sims in the City recognizes when the HDD is installed and allows data to be saved directly to it. Also uses a 512 MB "__tmp" Partition to cache Game Files to speed up load times.
- The Sims 2 recognizes when the HDD is installed and allows data to be saved directly to it. Also uses a 512 MB "__tmp" Partition to cache Game Files to speed up load times.

^† 2K sports titles up to the 2K9 versions (except College Hoops, where it only applies to 2K6, 2K7 and 2K8 versions since there is no 2K9), also use the HDD to display recorded replays from game action. Without it, stills are shown in NBA games (during halftime and the end of the game) and no end-of-inning replays are shown in MLB.

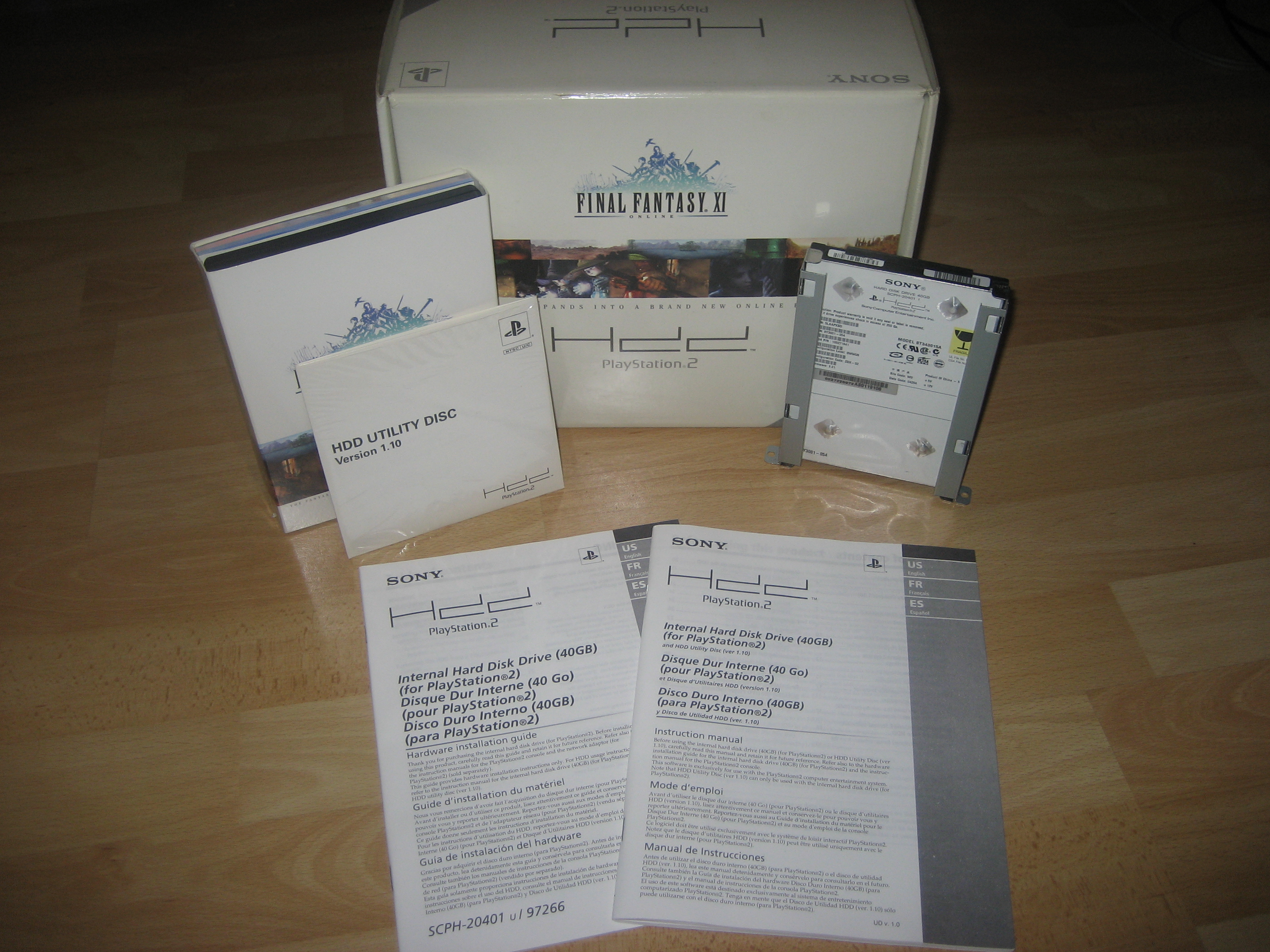
The Final Fantasy XI game that came bundled with the 40 GB hard drive that required the Network Adaptor

=== Japanese releases with HDD support ===
- A Ressha de Ikou 2001 Perfect Set (A-Train 2001 + Train-Pack) installs 256 MB to the HDD, and the Train-Pack installs an additional 14 MB.
- Ace Combat 4 installs 1 GB to speed up load times.
- Aero Dancing 4 uses the HDD for save games and as a cache for game files to decrease load times.
- Age of Empires II: The Age of Kings installs 128 MB to speed up the game, so it no longer "Freezes" in game to load the needed data from the Game CD-ROM.
- AirForce Delta Blue Wing Knights installs 1 GB to reduce load times.
- All Star Pro-Wrestling II installs 128 MB to reduce load times.
- Beatmania IIDX 5th Style can cache song files to the HDD to reduce load times. In addition, using HDD caching will enable a bonus gameplay mode.
- Biohazard Outbreak (Both File 1 and File 2) installs 1 GB to the HDD for reduced loading times.
- Bomberman Kart, has downloadable content with new tracks to install on HDD.
- Capcom vs. SNK 2 installs to the HDD to reduce load times and allows the game to be saved to and loaded from the HDD instead of a Memory Card.
- Beni no Umi 2 (Crimson Sea 2) installs 256 MB to reduce load times.
- Dark Chronicle (aka Dark Cloud 2) installs a 1.5 GB file to the HDD to reduce load times. The Asia version also supports the HDD (most Asia versions of games have HDD support removed).
- Vampire: Darkstalkers Collection installs 1 GB to speed up load times.
- Dirge of Cerberus: Final Fantasy VII requires the hard drive for online play as the game uses Square Enix's PlayOnline service.
- Final Fantasy X (and Final Fantasy X International) installs a 1.6 GB file to the HDD to reduce load times.
- Final Fantasy XI (and the Final Fantasy XI: Rise of the Zilart, Final Fantasy XI: Chains of Promathia, Final Fantasy XI: Treasures of Aht Urhgan, and Final Fantasy XI:Wings of the Goddess expansions) fully installs to the HDD so that it can be patched/updated. Uses 8,192 MB, with both expansions installed, as of March 7, 2005 (Note: This does not include the Treasures of Aht Urgahn and Wings of the Goddess expansions as they were released after).
- G1 Jockey 3 2003 installs 512 MB to reduce load times.
- G1 Jockey 3 2005 Nendoban installs 512 MB to reduce load times.
- G1 Jockey 4 2006 installs 1 GB to reduce load times.
- G1 Jockey 4 2007 & Winning Post 7 Maximum 2007 each install 1 GB to decrease load times.
- G1 Jockey 4 2008 installs 1 GB to speed up load times.
- G1 Jockey 4 installs 1 GB to reduce load times.
- Guitar Freaks 4th Mix & DrumMania 3rd Mix installs to the HDD to reduce load times.
- Gundam Musou 2 installs 512 MB to speed up load times
- Gundam Musou Special installs 512 MB to speed up load times.
- Taishou Mononoke Ibunroku installs 128 MB to reduce load times.
- Tamamayu Monogatari 2 (Jade Cocoon 2) installs to the HDD to reduce load times.
- Jikkyō Powerful Major League 2 installs 512 MB to reduce load times.
- Jikkyō Powerful Major League 3 installs 512 MB to reduce load times.
- Jikkyō Powerful Major League 2009 Installs 1 GB to reduce load times.
- Jikkyō Powerful Pro Yakyuu 12 Ketteiban installs 512 MB to reduce load times.
- Jikkyō Powerful Pro Yakyuu 13 installs 512 MB to reduce load times.
- Jikkyō Powerful Pro Yakyuu 13 Ketteiban installs 512 MB to reduce load times.
- Jikkyō Powerful Pro Yakyuu 14 installs 512 MB to reduce load times.
- Jikkyō Powerful Pro Yakyuu 14 Ketteiban installs 512 MB to reduce load times.
- Jikkyō Powerful Pro Yakyuu 15 installs 512 MB to reduce load times.
- Kessen III installs 2 GB to reduce load times.
- Kidou Senshi Gundam - Renpou vs. Zeon DX (Mobile Suit Gundam - Federation vs. Zeon Deluxe) uses the HDD for saving/loading.
- King of Colosseum Green/Red each install 512 MB to reduce load times. If you have both Green and Red installed, the Green version will use the installed files of the Red version as an "Expansion pack".
- Kingdom Hearts (and Kingdom Hearts Final Mix) installs a 1,280 MB file to the HDD to reduce load times.
- Lilie no Atelier Plus Salburg no Renkinjutsushi 3 installs 128 MB to reduce load times.
- Let's Bravo Music let players download extra music and adventures to the HDD.
- Metal Saga installs 1.7 GB to the HDD to decrease load time and uses the HDD to save and load game instead of a Memory Card.
- Mina no Golf Online requires the HDD for play.
- Tetra Master fully installs to the HDD so that it can be patched/updated, currently using 128 MB. It comes with Final Fantasy XI.
- TVware uses the HDD.
- Nobunaga no Yabou: Kakushin with Power-Up Kit installs 512 MB to reduce load times.
- Nobunaga no Yabou: Kakushin installs 512 MB to reduce load times.
- Nobunaga no Yabou: Online requires the HDD for updates/patches(MMORPG).
- Nobunaga no Yabou: Ranseiki installs to the HDD to reduce load times.
- Nobunaga no Yabou: Soutensoku with Power-Up Kit installs 256 MB to reduce load times.
- Nobunaga no Yabou: Soutensoku installs 256 MB to reduce load times.
- Nobunaga no Yabou: Tenka Sousei with Power-Up Kit installs 512 MB to reduce load times.
- Nobunaga no Yabou: Tenka Sousei installs 512 MB to reduce load times.
- PlayOnline Viewer fully installs to the HDD so that it can be patched/updated, currently using 1 GB. It is used to boot Final Fantasy XI, Front Mission Online, Tetra Master, and JongHowLo.
- PoPoLoCrois Hajimari no Bouken installs 640 MB to reduce load times.
- Winning Eleven 5: Final Evoloution installs 512 MB to reduce load times.
- Winning Eleven Tactics: European Club Soccer Installs to the HDD to reduce load times.
- Winning Eleven 6: Final Evolution installs 512 MB to decrease load times.
- Winning Eleven 8: Liveware Evolution installs 1 GB to decrease load times.
- Pro Soccer Club o Tsukurou Europe Championship installs 2.5 GB to reduce load times.
- Romancing SaGa Minstrel's Song installs a 5 GB file to the HDD to reduce load times.
- Sengoku Musō 2 Empires installs 1 GB to reduce load times.
- Sengoku Musō 2 Moushouden installs 1 GB to reduce load times.
- Sengoku Musō 2 installs 1 GB to reduce load times.
- Sengoku Musō Moushouden installs 1 MB to reduce load times.
- Sengoku Musō installs 1 GB to reduce load times.
- San Goku Shi 11 installs 512 MB to reduce load times.
- San Goku Shi 11 with Power-Up Kit installs 512 MB to reduce load times.
- San Goku Shi 9 installs 128 MB to reduce load times.
- San Goku Shi 8 installs to the HDD to reduce load times.
- San Goku Shi 10 installs 512 MB to reduce load times.
- Shadow Hearts 2 installs 1.28 GB to reduce load times.
- Shin Sangoku Musou 3 Empires installs 1 GB to reduce load times.
- Shin Sangoku Musou 3 installs a 512 MB file to the HDD to reduce load times.
- Shin Sangoku Musou 3 Moushouden installs a 1 GB file to the HDD to reduce load times.
- Shin Sangoku Musou 4 Empires installs 1 MB to reduce load times.
- Shin Sangoku Musou 4 installs 1 MB to reduce load times.
- Shin Sangoku Musou 4 Moushouden installs 1 MB to reduce load times.
- Shin Sangoku Musou 5 Special installs 512 MB to speed up load times.
- Star Ocean: Till the End of Time (and the Director's Cut) installs to the HDD to reduce load times. Installation also reduces occurrences of a game crashing glitch that is known to happen on the first batch of discs when played on model 1x000 PS2s.
- Street Fighter ZERO Fighter's Generation installs a 2 GB file to the HDD to reduce loading time.
- The Sims 2 optionally uses the HDD for save games and as a cache for game files to decrease load times.
- The Urbz: Sims in the City optionally uses the HDD for save games and as a cache for game files to decrease load times.
- Unlimited Saga installs a 3,072 MB file to the HDD to reduce load times.
- Venus & Braves uses the HDD for save games instead of a Memory Card.
- Virtua Fighter 4 installs 512 MB to HDD to decrease load times.
- Musou Orochi Maou Sairin installs 1 GB to decrease load times.
- Musou Orochi installs 1 MB to reduce load times.
- Wild Arms Advanced 3rd installs to the HDD to reduce load times.
- Wild Arms Alter Code:F installs to HDD to reduce load times.
- Winback 2:Project Poseidon installs 1 GB to reduce load times.
- Winning Eleven 7 installs to the HDD to speed up load times.
- Winning Post 5 Maximum 2002 installs 512 MB to reduce load times.
- Winning Post 5 Maximum 2003 installs 512 MB to reduce load times.
- Winning Post 6: 2005 Nendoban installs 1 MB to reduce load times.
- Winning Post 6 installs 1 MB to reduce load times.
- Winning Post 7 Maximum 2006 installs 1 GB to reduce load times.
- Winning Post 7 Maximum 2008 uses the HDD for save games and as a cache for game files to decrease load times.
- Winning Post 7 installs 1 GB to reduce load times.
- Winning Post World 2010 installs 1 GB to reduce load times.
- Winning Post World installs 1 GB to reduce load times.
- Xenosaga Episode 1 installs a 1.7 GB file to the HDD to reduce load times. It allows the game to be saved to and loaded from the HDD instead of a Memory Card. This is true for both the original release and the Reloaded edition.
- DJ Box Sony Computer Entertainment's MP3 DJ mixing program requires the hard drive for MP3 storage. Users can also save the DJ mixes that they make with the software to the hard drive.
- JongHowLo installs to the HDD so that it can be patched/updated; it comes with Final Fantasy XI. The game uses 256 MB.
- Pop'n Taisen Puzzle-dama Online Installation to the HDD is required to play. The game boots from PSBBN or HDD Utility Disc and does not require the disc or a registration code, making it a very unusual case of HDD support, as it has no anti-piracy protection to prevent the disc from being passed around in a group of people.
- Zettai Zetsumei Toshi (aka Disaster Report) installs to the HDD to reduce load times.

== Linux Kit ==
The Linux Kit for PlayStation 2 was released in 2002 and included the PlayStation 2 Linux software, keyboard, mouse, VGA adapter (which requires an RGB monitor that supports sync-on-green signals), Network Adaptor (Ethernet only) and a 40 GB hard disk drive. It allows the PlayStation 2 to be used as a personal computer.

== Hacking and modding ==
Since the mid-2010s, it is possible to install and use the PlayStation BB Navigator (PS-BBN) and the HDD-OSD (HDD Utility-Disc) on every PlayStation 2 console from every region. This can be achieved with the use of special "patched" files for the HDD-OSD, PS-BBN, and a modified version of "uLaunch" (a well-known piece of PlayStation 2 homebrew software) called "hacked-ule". It is now also possible to install homebrew software to the HDD and make it launchable through the HDD-OSD and PS-BBN's "Game-Channel", just like any other official HDD game. However, installing such homebrew software to the HDD still requires much work in a Hex-Editor. PS-BBN can now also be fully translated into any given language; the translation process involves the use of the "Beta-linux" release for PlayStation 2 and a specially compiled kernel which gives access to the "APA-ReiserFS" partitions.

As of 2013, most (if not all) games that use the HDD to install data (to decrease load time) and/or to save/load (instead of using a Memory Card) can be used on any PlayStation 2 console from any region and on any HDD by using a Hex-Editor (or ATADPatcher v0.02) and some type of booting software such as "ESR" (another well-known piece of PlayStation 2 homebrew software). If a "patched" copy of HDD-OSD and/or PlayStation BB Navigator (PS-BBN) is used, users can see all the data currently installed in the same way as with the official PS2 hard drive ("SONY 40 GB HDD", SCPH-20401).
