= Hardware: Online Arena =

2003 video game

- Developer: London Studio
- Publisher: Sony Computer Entertainment
- Producer: Peter Edward
- Designers: Nick Ryan; Pritpal Panesar
- Programmers: Andy Swann; Jason Doig; Tim Darby
- Artists: Noel Flores‑Watson; Iki Ikram; Matthew Painter; Matthew Harwood
- Composers: David Ranyard; Garry Taylor; Alastair Lindsay
- Platform: PlayStation 2
- Release: EU: 7 November 2003
- Genre: Vehicular combat
- Modes: Single-player, multiplayer

Hardware: Online Arena was a 2003 online multiplayer vehicular combat video game developed by London Studio and published by Sony Computer Entertainment for the PlayStation 2. It was released alongside the launch of online play for the console and was thus the first online game for PlayStation 2. Gameplay was focused on vehicular destruction using varying means such as missiles, lasers and machine guns. The game's commercial performance was initially modest until it was added onto the network access disk that came with the purchase of the network adaptor and, as a result, the game had become one of the three most popular games played online in 2003, having over 200 users online at any time. GamesMaster said the game was, "A great indicator of the shape of things to come for PS2 online."

A spin-off game on the PlayStation Portable was released in 2005 under the name Fired Up. A PlayStation 4 game based on the original called Hardware: Rivals was released as a PlayStation Plus exclusive beta on the PlayStation Network on 29 September 2015.
