= World Tour Soccer: Challenge Edition =

2005 video game

- North American cover art featuring Tim Howard
- Developer: London Studio
- Publisher: Sony Computer Entertainment
- Series: This Is Football
- Platform: PlayStation Portable
- Release: NA: 22 March 2005; EU: 1 September 2005
- Genre: Sports
- Modes: Single-player, multiplayer

World Tour Soccer: Challenge Edition, known as simply World Tour Soccer in North America, is a 2005 sports video game developed by London Studio and published by Sony Computer Entertainment exclusively for PlayStation Portable as a launch title for the system.

== Reception ==
Reception

Aggregate score
Aggregator	Score
Metacritic	70/100

Review scores
Publication	Score
1Up.com	B−
Eurogamer	7/10
Game Informer	6.25/10
GamePro	3.5/5
GameRevolution	C
GameSpot	7.6/10
GameSpy	3/5
GameZone	8.5/10
IGN	7.4/10
Official U.S. PlayStation Magazine	3/5

World Tour Soccer: Challenge Edition received "mixed or average" reviews, according to review aggregator Metacritic.
