= This Is Football =

Association football video game series

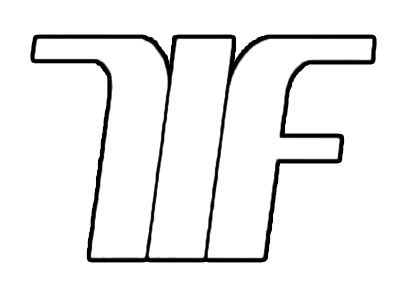
- Genre(s): Sports
- Developer(s): Team Soho (1999-2001); London Studio (2002-06); Sports Director Limited (2010)
- Publisher(s): Sony Computer Entertainment
- Platform(s): PlayStation, PlayStation 2, PlayStation Portable
- First release: This Is Football; 10 December 1999
- Latest release: This Is Football Management; 11 February 2010

This Is Football (known in North America as World Tour Soccer) is an association football video game series originally developed by Team Soho and published by Sony Computer Entertainment. Later instalments were developed by London Studio after Team Soho's merge into the studio. Sports Director Limited took over developing the latest game.

== Games ==
Aggregate review scores
Game	Metacritic
This Is Football	N/A
This Is Football 2	N/A
This Is Football 2002	77/100
This Is Football 2003	78/100
This Is Football 2004	68/100
This Is Football 2005	56/100
World Tour Soccer: Challenge Edition	70/100
World Tour Soccer 2	72/100
This Is Football Management	N/A

== See also ==
- Adidas Power Soccer
