= Team Soho =

British video game developer

- Formerly: Sony Computer Entertainment Europe (1995–2002)
- Type: Subsidiary
- Industry: Video games
- Founded: January 6, 1995; 31 years ago
- Defunct: ~2008; 18 years ago
- Fate: Dissolved
- Successor: London Studio
- Headquarters: Soho, London, United Kingdom
- Products: NBA ShootOut (1996–1997); This Is Football (1999–2001); The Getaway (2002)
- Parent: Sony Computer Entertainment

Team Soho was a British video game developer based in Soho, London. It was formerly the video game development division of Sony Computer Entertainment Europe before being spun off to develop The Getaway series; a second unit at Cambridge would later be spun off as SCEE Cambridge Studio.

The company was founded on January 6, 1995 as a unit of Sony Electronic Publishing. The original development staff had little to no experience in the video game industry, with most of them being recent college graduates, being members from Next Generation magazine.

They started out with developing NBA ShootOut, the first entry of the NBA ShootOut series, which released in 1996. They later developed NBA ShootOut '97, before moving to the San Diego studio in 1997. The company later made the racing games Porsche Challenge and Rapid Racer in 1997, the latter was localized in North America as Turbo Prop Racing.

In 1998, the team developed Spice World, which was published in the North America by Psygnosis under license from SCEE since SCEA executives isn't interested in localizing the game. Afterwards, they begin work on the This is Football series, meant for a European audience, which was localized by 989 Sports with World Tour Soccer.

In 2000, while Sony Computer Entertainment Europe was identifying the development teams, Team Soho was picked up as a development name during the production of The Getaway, while the Cambridge studio adopted the name SCEE Cambridge Studio.

In early 2002, the company made another breakthrough with the game The Getaway, with strong showings at E3 2002. In 2002, the studio was closed and merged with SCE Studio Camden (formerly Psygnosis Camden Studio) to form London Studio. The Team Soho brand was retained for The Getaway: Black Monday.

The Getaway creative director, Brendan McNamara, founded Team Bondi in mid-2003 in Sydney, and had hired several former staff members of Team Soho. After Bondi's closure, he founded Videogames Deluxe, which was sold to Rockstar Games in 2025.

== List of software developed ==
| Year | Game | Platform(s) |
|---|---|---|
| 1996 | NBA ShootOut | PlayStation |
| 1997 | NBA ShootOut '97 | PlayStation |
| 1997 | Porsche Challenge | PlayStation |
| 1997 | Rapid Racer | PlayStation |
| 1998 | Spice World | PlayStation |
| 1999 | This Is Football | PlayStation |
| 2000 | This Is Football 2 | PlayStation |
| 2001 | This Is Football 2002 | PlayStation 2 |
| 2002 | The Getaway | PlayStation 2 |
| 2006 | The Getaway 3 (cancelled) | PlayStation 3 |
