= World Tour Soccer 2 =

2006 video game

- European cover art
- Developer(s): London Studio
- Publisher(s): Sony Computer Entertainment
- Series: This Is Football
- Platform(s): PlayStation Portable
- Release: EU: 23 June 2006; NA: 27 June 2006
- Genre(s): Sports
- Mode(s): Single-player, multiplayer

World Tour Soccer 2, known as World Tour Soccer 06 in North America, is a 2006 sports video game developed by London Studio and published by Sony Computer Entertainment for the PlayStation Portable.

== Reception ==
Reception

Aggregate score
Aggregator	Score
Metacritic	72/100

World Tour Soccer 2 received "mixed or average" reviews, according to review aggregator Metacritic.
