= This Is Football Management =

2010 video game

- Developer(s): Sports Director
- Publisher(s): Sony Computer Entertainment
- Series: This Is Football
- Platform(s): PlayStation Portable
- Release: EU: 11 February 2010
- Genre(s): Sports
- Mode(s): Single-player, multiplayer

This Is Football Management is a 2010 sports video game developed by Sports Director and published by Sony Computer Entertainment for the PlayStation Portable. It was released as a PlayStation mini.

== Reception ==
The PSP version received 5 out of 10 from PlayStation Official Magazine – UK.
