= PlayStation Broadband Navigator =

Software for the PlayStation 2

PlayStation BB
- Developer: Sony Computer Entertainment
- Type: Operating system
- Launched: 2002
- Discontinued: Yes
- Final version: 0.32
- Platform: PlayStation 2
- Status: Discontinued
- Pricing model: Free, with additional subscriptions for optional content
- Website: https://web.archive.org/web/20060831015928/http://www.jp.playstation.com/ps2/psbb/index.html

PlayStation Broadband Navigator (also referred to as BB Navigator and PSBBN) is an operating system and a discontinued web service for the PlayStation 2 video game console. It was an replacement to the default system firmware which introduced more extensive internet functionality and required the console's Network Adapter and Hard Disk Drive accessories.

The software was originally released in April 2002 exclusively for the Japanese market, and was distributed through ISPs such as BIGLOBE and So-net. The software's included web services were shut down on March 31, 2016.

== Features ==
=== Game channels ===
Splash screen for the PlayStation Now! channel

The software featured access to several "channels" which featured content from game developers such as Bandai, Capcom, Electronic Arts, Hudson Soft, Koei, Namco and SCE Japan Studio. Channels from other sources included content from ISPs such as BIGLOBE and Isao.net, Sega's own internet service. Users could view information on releases and services by these companies and download content to the hard drive such as game demoes, exclusive games and multimedia content.

A "PlayStation Now!" channel was also available, which demonstrated new and upcoming titles, as well as popular games and PlayStation accessories.

=== Multimedia ===
As of version 0.20, users could also access channels for multimedia content beyond games.

- The Music Channel allows users to rip CDs and save music to the HDD as well as to transfer audio files between a NetMD player and the HDD.
  - The ability to transfer data to NetMD discs was removed in version 0.32
- The Photo Channel allows users to transfer pictures to and from the HDD and to display them on the PlayStation 2.
- The Movie Channel allows users to transfer videos to and from the HDD and to watch them on the PlayStation 2.

=== Other features ===
The BB Navigator also included the NetFront 3.0 web browser, an email client and (as of version 0.30) the ability to manage a feega account, a service ran by Sony for online games that had a subscription service.

== History ==
The software was first announced by Sony Computer Entertainment on February 13, 2002 as a partnership between different internet service providers in Japan.

PlayStation Broadband Navigator version history
Version	Release date	Changes
0.10	April 2002	Initial version, bundled with BB Unit kits
0.20	September 2002	Added the ability to update within the operating system; Added support for managing game saves on the HDD and Memory Card; Added support for transferring audio files to and from a MiniDisc player
0.30	July 2003	Support for managing feega accounts; Added an email client
0.31	Late 2003	Security patches
0.32	May 31, 2004	Removes ability to transfer music to a MiniDisc player

== International release ==
Sony Computer Entertainment released the Hard Disk Drive accessory in Europe as part of the Linux for PlayStation 2 bundle on May 22, 2002, with a North American release of the accessory on March 23, 2004. While Sony repeatedly asserted that the BB Navigator would release in non-Japanese regions at a later date, the Broadband Navigator was ultimately never released outside of Japan following the introduction of the PS2 slimline models, which did not have support for the hard drive.

The software can still be used with any compatible PS2s outside of Japan using a soft-modded console.

== See also ==
- Central Station (service)
- PlayOnline
- XrossMediaBar
