= This Is Football (video game) =

1999 association football video game

- Developer: Team Soho
- Publisher: Sony Computer Entertainment
- Producer: Tony Racine
- Designer: Dominic Cahalin
- Composer: Jason Page
- Series: This Is Football
- Platform: PlayStation
- Release: EU: 10 December 1999
- Genre: Sports
- Modes: Single-player, multiplayer

This Is Football is a 1999 association football video game developed by Team Soho and published by Sony Computer Entertainment for the PlayStation. The first instalment of the This Is Football series, it was only released in Europe. The game carries a licence from FIFPro allowing the inclusion of 30,000 real-life players and features English-language commentary from Clive Tyldesley.

== Gameplay ==
The player takes control of a football coach for a team of either the English Football League, or the French football team.

The player then takes control of the entire football team, kicking the ball between the players in attempt to score points by kicking the ball into the goal. The player can complete this task by using the game’s system of interceptions and kickings. The game plays like a game of football.

== Development ==
The game was developed by Sony Computer Entertainment Europe subsidiary studio Team Soho. Motion capture was carried out at the facilities of Aston Villa FC using an Oxford Metrics 370E system. Commentary comes from ITV's Clive Tyldesley.

== Reception ==
Steve Owen gave a mixed review of the game for Official UK PlayStation Magazine, criticising the control system and some of the AI behaviour while praising the overall presentation of the game and the quality of the animation, awarding it a score of 7 out of 10 but noting "with FIFA and ISS Pro on offer, TIF only scrapes into third place".
