= This Is Football 2004 =

2004 video game

- Developer: London Studio
- Publishers: EU: Sony Computer Entertainment; NA: 989 Sports
- Series: This Is Football
- Platform: PlayStation 2
- Release: EU: 26 March 2004; NA: 13 April 2004
- Genre: Sports
- Modes: Single-player, multiplayer

This Is Football 2004, known as World Tour Soccer 2005 in North America, is a sports video game developed by London Studio and published by Sony Computer Entertainment in Europe and 989 Sports in North America exclusively for PlayStation 2.

Most teams are unlicensed except for Spanish La Liga teams and Austrian Bundesliga teams.

== Reception ==
Reception

Aggregate score
Aggregator	Score
Metacritic	68/100

Review scores
Publication	Score
Eurogamer	8/10
GamePro	4/5
GameSpot	5.4/10
GameSpy	4/5
GameZone	7.5/10
IGN	76/100

This is Football 2004 received "mixed or average" reviews, according to review aggregator Metacritic.
