= Central Station (service) =

Online service for the PlayStation 2

- Developer: Sony Computer Entertainment Europe
- Type: Online service
- Launched: 2003; 23 years ago
- Platforms: PlayStation 2; PlayStation Portable
- Status: Defunct

Central Station (also known as Network Gaming Service) was an online service operated by Sony Computer Entertainment Europe in PAL regions for the PlayStation 2.

The service allowed users to have friend lists, view new game releases, read the latest PlayStation-related news, enter events, and play Central Station-integrated online games for the PlayStation 2 and PlayStation Portable consoles. The service acted as a Sony official alternative to middleware like GameSpy but with extra features similar to Xbox Live or PlayStation Network. The Central Station portal could be accessed via a Network Access Disc which would be used to set up an internet connection.

Central Station was superseded by the worldwide PlayStation Network upon release of the PlayStation 3. It is unclear when it was discontinued.

== History ==
Logo before rebrand

The overall history of Central Station is unclear due to very limited documentation. However, multiple Network Access Discs have been dumped and preserved online. These discs show that Central Station went through at least two major UI/Branding changes outside of beta testing.

Around November 2004, Sony gave out new discs to registered users. These discs included a new settings UI, a new Central Station portal, and Hardware: Online Arena.

The Central Station middleware seems to have been used on some PlayStation Portable games as-well, although no evidence exists showing that users could access the Central Station portal on PlayStation Portable consoles.

A beta disc known as "Mirage" was dumped online that has a very rough concept of the Central Station UI, alongside was a scanned document that was released on a Tumblr blog indicating that British Telecom worked with Sony Computer Entertainment Europe to integrate H.264 streaming into the Network Access Discs.

== Usage ==
Central Station required users to register their console with two to three different codes depending on the console's model. These would mainly consist of a Network Access Code (included in the disc or console packaging), the Console Model Number, and the Network Adapter Serial Number. After going through the registration process, users would receive a PIN code in the mail that could be entered on the console or on the Network Gaming Service website.

== Supported Games ==
All of the games that support Central Station are published by Sony Computer Entertainment or a similar subsidiary:

Title	Year	Developer
Amplitude	2003	Harmonix
Destruction Derby: Arenas	2004	Studio 33
EverQuest Online Adventures	2003	Sony Online Entertainment
Everybody's Golf 4	2003	Clap Hanz
EyeToy: Chat	2005	London Studio
FORMULA ONE 04	2004	Studio Liverpool
FORMULA ONE 05	2005	Studio Liverpool
Hardware: Online Arena	2003	London Studio
Jak X: Combat Racing	2005	Naughty Dog
Killzone	2004	Guerrilla Games
My Street	2003	Idol Minds
Ratchet & Clank 3	2004	Insomniac Games
Ratchet: Gladiator	2005	Insomniac Games
SOCOM 3: US Navy SEALs	2005	Zipper Interactive
SOCOM II: U.S. Navy SEALs	2003	Zipper Interactive
SOCOM: U.S. Navy SEALs	2003 (EU)	Zipper Interactive
SOCOM: U.S. Navy SEALs Combined Assault	2006	Zipper Interactive
Syphon Filter: Omega Strain	2004	Bend Studio
This is Football 2004	2004	London Studio
Twisted Metal: Black Online	2001	Incognito Entertainment
WRC 4	2004	Evolution Studios
WRC Rally Evolved	2005	Evolution Studios

== See also ==
- PlayStation 2 online functionality
- PlayStation Network
- PlayOnline
- Xbox Live
- Nintendo Wi-Fi Connection
