= PlayStation Multitap =

Peripheral for the PlayStation game console

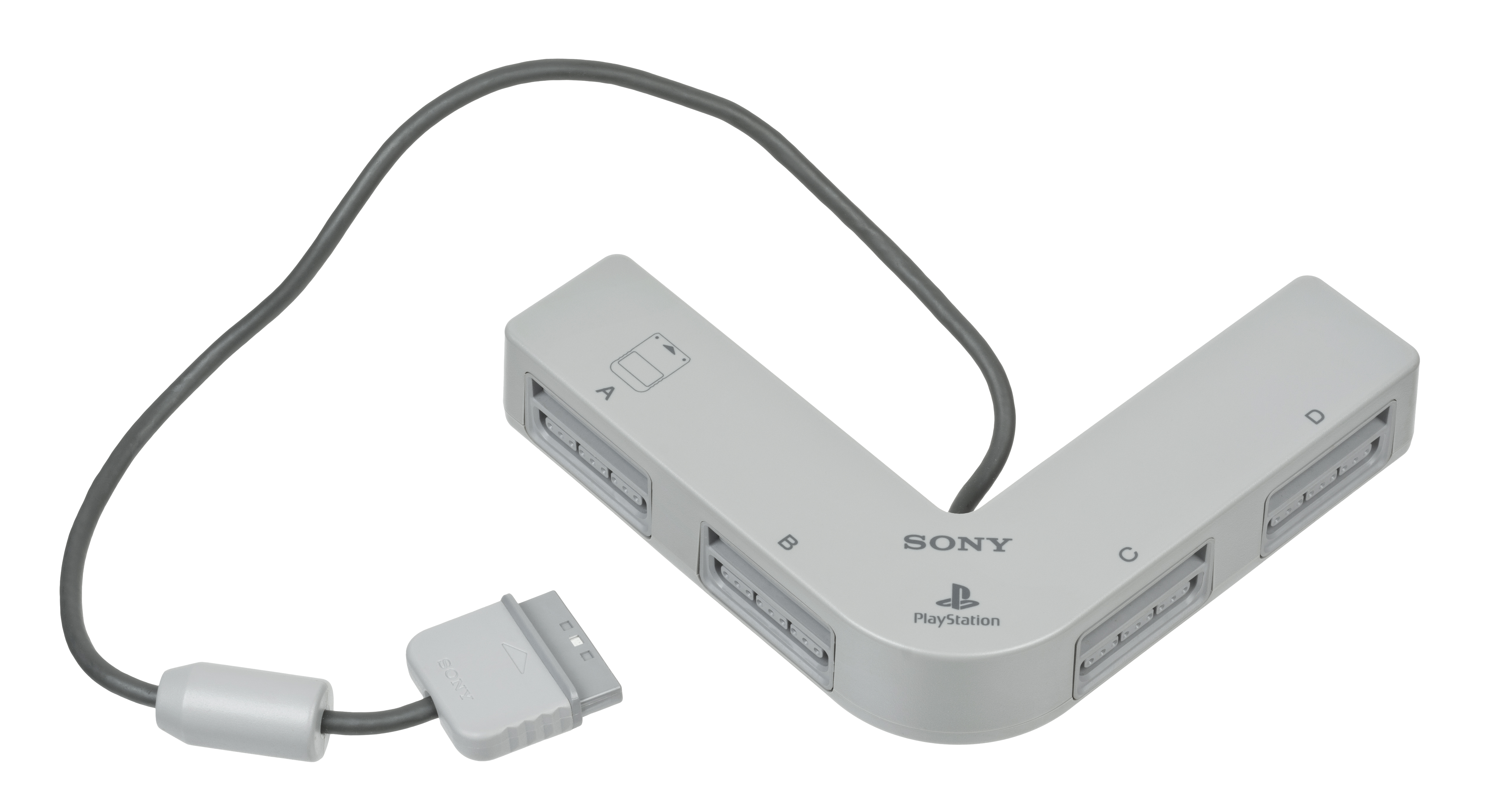
The official multitap for the PlayStation

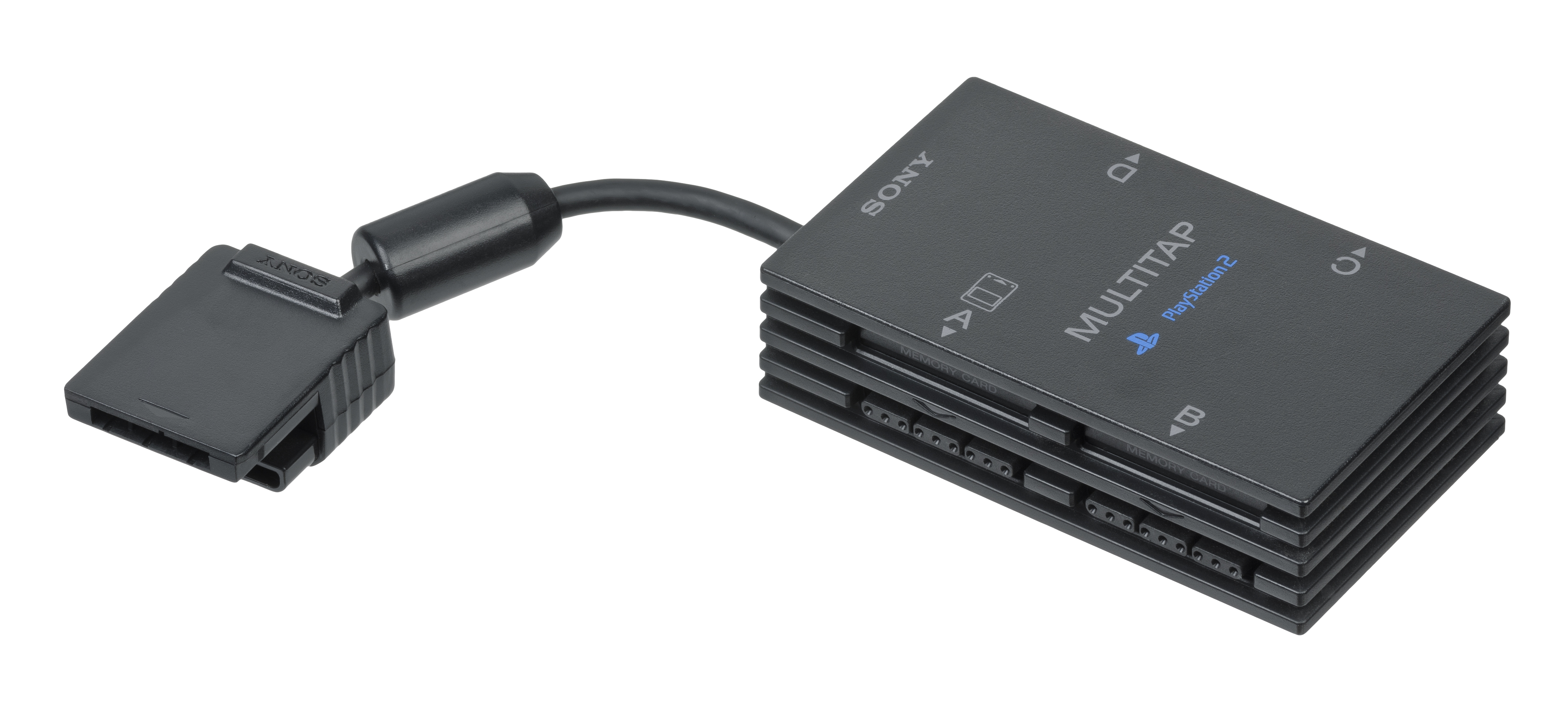
The official multitap for the PlayStation 2

The PlayStation Multitap is a peripheral for the PlayStation and PlayStation 2. It is an adapter that can be used to plug in up to four controllers and memory cards at the same time in a single controller port. With a second multitap, up to eight controllers and memory cards can be plugged at once. For 4-player games, the multitap must be plugged into controller port 1.

== Compatibility ==
The PlayStation Multitap was originally available in gray (SCPH-1070 U) to match the original console's color; however, it was later re-released in white as well (SCPH-1070 UH) to match the colors of the later PS one redesign. Both versions are compatible with the original PS one, as well as all models of the PlayStation 2 prior to the SCPH-70000 series. Both versions of SCPH-1070 will only function with original PlayStation games, while multiplayer PS2 games required a separate multitap, the SCPH-10090. PlayStation 2 consoles from the SCPH-70000 series require the SCPH-70120 multitap, which is compatible with both PS and PS2 software.

	PlayStation Multitap (SCPH-1070 U)	PS one Multitap (SCPH-1070 UH)	PlayStation 2 Multitap (SCPH-10090)	PlayStation 2 'slim' Multitap (SCPH-70120)
PlayStation	Yes	Yes	No	No
PS One	Yes	Yes	No	No
PlayStation 2 (PS1 game)	Yes	Yes	No	No
PlayStation 2 (PS2 game)	No	No	Yes	No
PlayStation 2 'slim' (PS1 game)	Yes	Yes	No	Yes
PlayStation 2 'slim' (PS2 game)	No	No	No	Yes

== Supported games ==
=== PlayStation ===
1–3 Players

- Bishi Bashi Special
- Capcom Generations: Blazing Guns
- Captain Commando
- Rampage Through Time
- Rampage 2: Universal Tour

1-4 Players

- Actua Golf 3
- Actua Ice Hockey
- Actua Ice Hockey 2
- Actua Soccer 2
- Actua Tennis
- Adidas Power Soccer
- Adidas Power Soccer 2
- Adidas Power Soccer 98
- Adidas Power Soccer International 97
- All Star Tennis 2000
- All Star Tennis '99
- All Star Watersports
- Anna Kournikova's Smash Court Tennis
- Anokodokonoko
- Arcade's Greatest Hits: The Atari Collection 2
- Art Camion Sugorokuden
- Atari Anniversary Edition Redux
- Backyard Soccer
- Battle Hunter
- Blast Chamber
- Blaze and Blade: Eternal Quest
- Blaze and Blade Busters
- Bleach Blade Battlers 2nd
- Blood Lines
- Bomberman Land
- Breakout
- Break Point
- Brian Lara Cricket
- Buttsubushi
- Caesars Palace 2000
- Caesars Palace II
- California Surfing
- Card Shark
- Catan: Die Erste Insel
- Chessmaster II
- Chocobo Collection
- Circuit Breakers
- College Slam
- Crash Bash
- Crash Team Racing
- Cubix - Robots for Everyone: Race 'N Robots
- CyberTiger
- David Beckham Soccer
- Davis Cup Complete Tennis
- Destruction Derby Raw
- Dinomaster Party
- Dioramos
- Disney's Pooh's Party Game: In Search of the Treasure
- Dragon Money
- Dynamite Soccer 98
- ECW Anarchy Rulz
- ECW Hardcore Revolution
- ESPN MLS GameNight
- European Super League
- Family Games Compendium
- Fantastic Four
- The F.A. Premier League Stars
- The F.A. Premier League Stars 2001
- Fire Pro Wrestling G
- Fox Sports Golf '99
- Frogger
- Frogger 2: Swampy's Revenge
- Galaxian 3
- Gekido
- Gritz: The Pyramid Adventure
- High School! Kimengumi: The Table Hockey
- Hi・Hou・Ou: Mou Omae Tobakuchi Kikan!!
- Hogs of War
- Hot Shots Golf
- Hot Shots Golf 2
- Hot Wheels Extreme Racing
- Hyper Tennis: Final Match
- International Superstar Soccer 2000
- International Superstar Soccer Deluxe
- International Track & Field
- International Track & Field 2000
- ISS Pro Evolution
- ISS Pro Evolution 2
- Itadaki Street: Gorgeous King
- Jarrett & Labonte Stock Car Racing
- Jetracer
- Jigsaw Island: Japan Graffiti
- Jigsaw Madness
- Jonah Lomu Rugby
- Jun Classic C.C. & Rope Club
- Karei Naru Casino Club: Double Draw
- Kero Kero King
- Kick Off World
- Klonoa Beach Volleyball
- Kurt Warner's Arena Football Unleashed
- Love Game's WaiWai Tennis Plus
- Meru Purana
- Michael Owen's World League Soccer '99
- Missland 2
- Monster Racer
- Monte Carlo Games Compendium
- Motor Mash
- Motto Trump Shiyouyo!: i-mode no Grand Prix
- Ms. Pac-Man Maze Madness
- Music 2000
- Nagano Winter Olympics '98
- NBA Hangtime
- NBA Jam Extreme
- NBA Jam Tournament Edition
- NBA Showtime: NBA on NBC
- Need for Speed: Porsche Unleashed (US) / Need for Speed: Porsche 2000 (PAL)
- Need for Speed: V-Rally 2
- NFL Blitz 2000
- NFL Blitz 2001
- NHL Open Ice: 2 On 2 Challenge
- NOON: New Type Action Game
- Olympic Soccer
- Pangaea
- Panzer Bandit
- Paro Wars
- Peter Jacobsen's Golden Tee Golf
- Pete Sampras Tennis 97
- Pitball
- Polaris SnoCross
- Pong: The Next Level
- Power Play Sports Trivia
- Power Spike: Pro Beach Volleyball
- Poy Poy
- Poy Poy 2
- Premier Manager 2000
- Premier Manager: Ninety Nine
- Pro Evolution Soccer
- Pro Evolution Soccer 2
- Pro Wrestling Sengokuden: Hyper Tag Match
- Putter Golf
- Puyo Puyo Box
- Quake II
- Rageball
- Rakugaki Showtime (Japan)
- Rally Cross (video game)
- Rat Attack!
- Risk: The Game of Global Domination
- Road Rash: Jailbreak
- Running Wild
- S.C.A.R.S.
- Scrabble (video game)
- Shinobi no Roku
- Simple 1500 Series: Vol.55 - The Darts
- Simple 1500 Series: Vol.60 - The Table Hockey
- Simple 1500 Series: Vol.65 - The Golf
- Simple 1500 Series: Vol.72 - The Beach Volleyball
- Sky Sports Football Quiz
- Sky Sports Football Quiz Season 02
- Slam 'N Jam '96 featuring Magic & Kareem
- Sled Storm
- Smash Court
- Soccer '97
- South Park: Chef's Luv Shack
- Speed Punks
- Striker '96
- Striker Pro 2000
- Suchie-Pai Adventure: Doki Doki Nightmare
- Super Football Champ
- SuperLite 1500 Series: Anokodokonoko Endless Season
- Syndicate Wars
- Tales of Destiny II
- Tales of Eternia
- Team Buddies
- Tennis
- Tennis Arena
- Tiger Woods 99 PGA Tour Golf
- Tiger Woods PGA Tour 2000
- Tiger Woods PGA Tour 2001
- TOCA World Touring Cars
- Trash It
- Trump Shiyouyo! Fukkoku-ban
- Twisted Metal 3
- Twisted Metal 4
- Uchū Gōshōden: Bakuretsu Akindo
- UEFA Challenge
- UEFA Champions League Season 1998/99
- Vegas Casino
- Vegas Games 2000
- Viva Soccer
- VR Golf '97
- Waku Waku Derby
- WCW Mayhem
- Westlife Fan-O-Mania
- Who Wants to Be a Millionaire
- Who Wants to Be a Millionaire: 2nd Edition
- World League Soccer '98
- World Soccer: Winning Eleven 6 International
- Wu-Tang: Shaolin Style
- WWF Attitude
- WWF in Your House
- WWF Smackdown!
- WWF Smackdown! 2: Know Your Role
- WWF War Zone
- Yeh Yeh Tennis
- ZigZagBall
- Zipangujima: Unmei wa Saikoro ga Kimeru!?

1-5 Players

- Aquarian Age: Tokyo Wars
- Bomberman Party Edition
- Bomberman World
- Devil Dice
- Overboard!
- Shipwreckers!

1-6 Players

- Brunswick Circuit Pro Bowling
- The Game of Life
- NBA Hoopz
- Space Jam
- Ten Pin Alley
- Top Shop

1-8 Players

- 2002 FIFA World Cup
- Actua Soccer 3
- All Star Soccer
- Chris Kamara's Street Soccer
- Dare Devil Derby 3D
- FIFA 2000: Major League Soccer
- FIFA 2001
- FIFA 99
- FIFA: Road to World Cup 98
- FIFA Soccer 2002
- FIFA Soccer 2003
- FIFA Soccer 2004
- FIFA Soccer 2005
- FIFA Soccer 96
- FIFA Soccer 97
- FoxKids.com Micro Maniacs Racing
- Fox Sports Soccer '99
- Inspector Gadget: Gadget's Crazy Maze
- Jimmy Johnson's VR Football '98
- Madden NFL 2000
- Madden NFL 2001
- Madden NFL 2002
- Madden NFL 2003
- Madden NFL 2004
- Madden NFL 2005
- Madden NFL 97
- Madden NFL 98
- Madden NFL 99
- March Madness '98
- Micro Machines V3
- Micro Maniacs
- Monopoly
- Monster Rancher Battle Card Episode II
- NBA Action 98
- NBA Basketball 2000
- NBA in the Zone
- NBA in the Zone 2
- NBA in the Zone 2000
- NBA in the Zone '98
- NBA in the Zone '99
- NBA Live 2000
- NBA Live 2001
- NBA Live 2002
- NBA Live 2003
- NBA Live 96
- NBA Live 97
- NBA Live 98
- NBA Live 99
- NBA ShootOut
- NBA ShootOut 2000
- NBA ShootOut 2001
- NBA ShootOut 2002
- NBA ShootOut 2004
- NBA ShootOut '97
- NCAA Basketball: Final Four 97
- NCAA Final Four 2000
- NCAA Final Four 2001
- NCAA Final Four 99
- NCAA Football 2000
- NCAA Football 2001
- NCAA Football 98
- NCAA Football 99
- NCAA Gamebreaker
- NCAA GameBreaker 2000
- NCAA GameBreaker 2001
- NCAA GameBreaker 98
- NCAA GameBreaker 99
- NCAA March Madness 2000
- NCAA March Madness 2001
- NCAA March Madness 99
- NFL GameDay 2000
- NFL GameDay 2001
- NFL GameDay 2002
- NFL GameDay 2003
- NFL GameDay 2004
- NFL GameDay 2005
- NFL GameDay '97
- NFL GameDay 98
- NFL GameDay 99
- NFL Quarterback Club 97
- NFL Xtreme 2
- NHL 2000
- NHL 2001
- NHL 97
- NHL 98
- NHL 99
- NHL Blades of Steel 2000
- NHL Breakaway 98
- NHL Championship 2000
- NHL FaceOff 2000
- NHL FaceOff 2001
- NHL FaceOff '97
- NHL FaceOff '98
- NHL FaceOff 99
- NHL Powerplay 98
- Olympic Summer Games (video game)
- Pro 18 World Tour Golf
- Professional Underground League of Pain
- Puma Street Soccer
- Rival Schools
- ShaoLin
- Shiritsu Justice Gakuen: Nekketsu Seishun Nikki 2
- Street Racer
- Super Match Soccer
- Sydney 2000
- This Is Football
- This Is Football 2
- Triple Play 97
- Triple Play 98
- Triple Play 99
- UEFA Champions League Season 1999/2000
- UEFA Champions League Season 2000/2001
- UEFA Euro 2000
- World Cup 98

=== PlayStation 2 ===
1-4 Players

- ATV Offroad Fury
- ATV Offroad Fury 2
- ATV Offroad Fury 3
- ATV Offroad Fury 4
- Crash Nitro Kart
- Champions of Norrath
- Champions: Return to Arms
- Dead or Alive 2
- Def Jam Vendetta
- Def Jam: Fight for NY
- Digimon Rumble Arena 2
- Digimon World 4
- F1 Championship Season 2000
- Gauntlet Dark Legacy
- Kung Fu Panda (video game)
- Looney Tunes: Space Race
- Marvel Super Hero Squad (video game)
- Marvel: Ultimate Alliance
- Mashed: Drive to Survive
- Mashed: Fully Loaded
- Monopoly Party
- Nicktoons Unite!
- Ratchet & Clank: Up Your Arsenal
- Ratchet: Deadlocked
- Rayman M
- Rayman Raving Rabbids
- Sega Classics Collection
- Sega Superstars Tennis
- The Simpsons: Hit & Run
- Samurai Warriors 2
- Shrek 2
- Shrek SuperSlam
- Sonic Riders
- Sonic Riders: Zero Gravity
- SpongeBob SquarePants: Lights, Camera, Pants!
- The Grim Adventures of Billy & Mandy (video game)
- Tekken Tag Tournament
- TimeSplitters
- TimeSplitters 2
- TimeSplitters: Future Perfect
- Twisted Metal: Black

1-5 Players

- Bombastic

1-6 Players

- Risk: Global Domination
- WWE SmackDown! Shut Your Mouth
- WWE SmackDown! Here Comes the Pain
- WWE SmackDown! vs. RAW
- WWE SmackDown! vs. RAW 2006
- WWE SmackDown vs. RAW 2007
- WWE SmackDown vs. Raw 2008
- WWE SmackDown vs. Raw 2009
- WWE SmackDown vs. Raw 2010
- WWE SmackDown vs. Raw 2011

1-8 Players

- FIFA Football 2005
- WWF SmackDown! Just Bring It
