= San Diego Studio =

American video game developer

- Logo used since 2018
- Type: Subsidiary
- Industry: Video games
- Predecessors: Red Zone Interactive; 989 Sports
- Founded: 2001; 25 years ago
- Headquarters: San Diego, US
- Products: MLB The Show
- Parent: Sony Computer Entertainment (2001–2005); PlayStation Studios (2005–present)
- Website: sonysandiegostudio.games

San Diego Studio is an American video game developer of Sony Interactive Entertainment based in Sorrento Valley, San Diego. It is responsible for MLB: The Show games. The studio also developed the NBA series, The Mark of Kri, High Velocity Bowling, and Sports Champions.

== History ==
=== Origins ===
San Diego Studio was founded through a merger of Red Zone Interactive and the development division of 989 Sports. 989 Studios' internal game development team was originated in San Diego at Sony Imagesoft when members of Park Place Productions moved to Sony Imagesoft to start its own internal development team in 1993, primarily to work on the ESPN series.

The development team became Sony Interactive Studios America in 1995, after Sony Imagesoft became SISA. In 1996, members of the NHL FaceOff team at SISA left to form an independent game developer, Killer Game. Some members left Killer Game to form SolWorks in 1998. In 1997, team members leave SISA to form an independent game developer, Idol Minds.

The team became 989 Studios again in 1998 and worked on the third and fourth Twisted Metal games. Team members of non-sports games moved production to Santa Monica in late 1998 to start Santa Monica Studio. The online division of 989 was spun off as RedEye Interactive, which was later renamed to Verant Interactive in 1999, before it was sold to Sony Online Entertainment in 2000.

Red Zone Interactive, a San Diego–based development studio, was founded in December 1997 by former employees of Sony Interactive Studios America (SISA), the sole in-house studio of the Sony Computer Entertainment America (SCEA) between 1995 and 1998.

SISA was later renamed 989 Studios before being merged into SCEA in February 2000, with the "989" label being retained as a brand name. Red Zone Interactive's NFL GameDay series was among the games published under the "989 Sports" label. SCEA acquired Red Zone Interactive in January 2001, including its 65 employees led by president Chris Whaley. SCEA later acquired SolWorks and Killer Game, with the intent of merging into its San Diego studio.

=== Current studio ===
The current San Diego Studio was formally founded in 2001 from the former teams of 989 Sports and Red Zone Interactive. The studio initially inherited a team of developers from the Twisted Metal series, and a series of sports games developed under the 989 brand name, like the MLB series and the NBA ShootOut series. In 2003, after the release of The Mark of Kri, many team members left to form the independent game studio BottleRocket Entertainment, with the first game Rise of the Kasai, being a sequel to The Mark of Kri, which received mixed to positive reviews.

The studio shifted focus on producing sports games mostly the MLB and the NBA game series, until its focus shifted onto MLB The Show. The company then eliminated the 989 Sports and RedZone Interactive team names from development, and shifted exclusively to using the San Diego Studio name. In 2016, the team asides from the MLB The Show series experienced a mass of layoffs.

== Games developed ==
Year	Title	Platform(s)
1994	ESPN National Hockey Night	Sega CD, Sega Genesis, SNES
1994	ESPN Baseball Tonight	Sega CD
1994	ESPN NBA Hangtime '95	Sega CD
1994	ESPN SpeedWorld	Sega Genesis, SNES
1995	Jeopardy!	Microsoft Windows
1995	Wheel of Fortune	Microsoft Windows
1995	ESPN Extreme Games	PlayStation, MS-DOS
1995	NFL GameDay	PlayStation
1995	NHL FaceOff	PlayStation
1996	NCAA Gamebreaker	PlayStation
1996	MLB Pennant Race	PlayStation
1996	2Xtreme	PlayStation
1996	NFL GameDay '97	PlayStation
1997	Rally Cross	PlayStation
1997	NCAA Gamebreaker 98	PlayStation
1997	Spawn: The Eternal	PlayStation
1997	Tanarus	Microsoft Windows
1998	NBA ShootOut 98	PlayStation
1998	MLB '99	PlayStation
1998	Blasto	PlayStation
1998	NFL Xtreme	PlayStation
1998	Twisted Metal III	PlayStation
1999	EverQuest	Microsoft Windows
1999	MLB 2000	PlayStation
1999	3Xtreme	PlayStation
1999	NFL Xtreme 2	PlayStation
1999	Twisted Metal 4	PlayStation
1999	NBA ShootOut 2000	PlayStation
2000	MLB 2001	PlayStation
2001	NBA ShootOut 2001	PlayStation 2
2001	MLB 2002	PlayStation
2001	NFL GameDay 2002	PlayStation, PlayStation 2
2002	MLB 2003	PlayStation
2002	The Mark of Kri	PlayStation 2
2002	NBA ShootOut 2003	PlayStation 2
2002	NCAA GameBreaker 2003	PlayStation 2
2002	NFL GameDay 2003	PlayStation, PlayStation 2
2003	MLB 2004	PlayStation, PlayStation 2
2003	NBA ShootOut 2004	PlayStation 2
2003	NCAA GameBreaker 2004	PlayStation 2
2003	NFL GameDay 2004	PlayStation, PlayStation 2
2004	MLB 2005	PlayStation, PlayStation 2
2004	NFL GameDay 2005	PlayStation
2005	NBA	PlayStation Portable
2005	MLB 2006	PlayStation 2, PlayStation Portable
2005	NBA 06	PlayStation 2, PlayStation Portable
2006	MLB 06: The Show	PlayStation 2, PlayStation Portable
2006	Neopets: Petpet Adventures: The Wand of Wishing	PlayStation Portable
2006	NBA 07	PlayStation 2, PlayStation 3, PlayStation Portable
2007	MLB 07: The Show	PlayStation 2, PlayStation 3, PlayStation Portable
2007	NBA 08	PlayStation 2, PlayStation 3, PlayStation Portable
2007	High Velocity Bowling	PlayStation 3
2008	MLB 08: The Show	PlayStation 2, PlayStation 3, PlayStation Portable
2008	NBA 09: The Inside	PlayStation 2, PlayStation 3, PlayStation Portable
2009	MLB 09: The Show	PlayStation 2, PlayStation 3, PlayStation Portable
2009	NBA 10: The Inside	PlayStation Portable
2009	Pinball Heroes	PlayStation Portable
2010	MLB 10: The Show	PlayStation 2, PlayStation 3, PlayStation Portable
2010	ModNation Racers	PlayStation Portable, PlayStation 3
2010	Sports Champions	PlayStation 3
2011	MLB 11: The Show	PlayStation 2, PlayStation 3, PlayStation Portable
2011	Medieval Moves: Deadmund's Quest	PlayStation 3
2012	ModNation Racers: Road Trip	PlayStation Vita
2012	MLB 12: The Show	PlayStation 3, PlayStation Vita
2012	Sports Champions 2	PlayStation 3
2012	LittleBigPlanet Karting	PlayStation 3
2013	MLB 13: The Show	PlayStation 3, PlayStation Vita
2013	Pinball Heroes: Complete	PlayStation Vita
2014	MLB 14: The Show	PlayStation 3, PlayStation 4, PlayStation Vita
2015	MLB 15: The Show	PlayStation 3, PlayStation 4, PlayStation Vita
2015	Guns Up!	PlayStation 4, Microsoft Windows
2016	MLB The Show 16	PlayStation 3, PlayStation 4
2016	Kill Strain	PlayStation 4
2017	MLB The Show 17	PlayStation 4
2017	Drawn to Death	PlayStation 4
2017	StarBlood Arena	PlayStation 4
2018	MLB The Show 18	PlayStation 4
2019	MLB The Show 19	PlayStation 4
2020	MLB The Show 20	PlayStation 4
2021	MLB The Show 21	PlayStation 4, PlayStation 5, Xbox One, Xbox Series X/S
2022	MLB The Show 22	PlayStation 4, PlayStation 5, Xbox One, Xbox Series X/S, Nintendo Switch
2023	MLB The Show 23	PlayStation 4, PlayStation 5, Xbox One, Xbox Series X/S, Nintendo Switch
2024	MLB The Show 24	PlayStation 4, PlayStation 5, Xbox One, Xbox Series X/S, Nintendo Switch
2025	MLB The Show 25	PlayStation 5, Xbox Series X/S, Nintendo Switch
2026	MLB The Show 26	PlayStation 5, Xbox Series X/S, Nintendo Switch
