= PlayStation Underground =

American video game magazine

- The first issue of the PlayStation Underground
- Categories: Video game magazine
- Publisher: Sony Computer Entertainment America
- First issue: March 26, 1997
- Final issue Number: Q3 2001; 5.1
- Company: Sony Computer Entertainment America
- Country: United States
- Based in: Foster City, California
- Language: English

PlayStation Underground was an American video game magazine published quarterly by Sony Computer Entertainment America from 1997 to 2001. The magazine focused on the PlayStation fanbase, including gaming on the original Sony PlayStation and the PlayStation 2, and was promoted as a "PlayStation fan club". Unlike its paper-based counterpart the Official U.S. PlayStation Magazine, PlayStation Underground came in the form of CD-ROMs which could be played on the PlayStation and PlayStation 2 consoles. Subscribers were also given access to a members-only website.

== History ==
In December 1996, Sony announced a partnership with marketing agency Rapp Collins Worldwide to launch PlayStation Underground, a club designed to provide news, game demos, tips, interviews, and behind-the-scenes information. The magazine released its first issue on March 26, 1997 and its final issue in 2001, accumulating a total of seventeen issues during its active years. It was merged with Official U.S. PlayStation Magazine in 2001 after it was discontinued.

The RP-T version of PlayStation Underground's 'Holiday 2004' demo disc was released with a major glitch that caused the save data to be wiped on all memory cards connected to the PlayStation 2 if the demo for Viewtiful Joe 2 was played. Sony sent an email to subscribers of the magazine warning users to remove the memory cards from the PlayStation 2 before inserting the demo disc.

In 2015, PlayStation Underground returned as a video series where gameplay from upcoming games is shown in a Let's Play format while the PlayStation blog team discusses the game with the developer.

== Content ==
Each issue consists of two CD-ROMs that can be played on a PlayStation or a PlayStation 2 console, or an emulator.

=== Disc one ===
- The Vault - A collection of playable game demos of upcoming Sony Computer Entertainment America game titles.
- Code Book - Hints, cheat codes and strategy guides for video games.
- Imports - Preview of games from around the world such as Europe and Japan which have yet to be released in the United States.
- Download Station - Additional game content, such as extra secret levels or hidden characters, which are saved into the memory card for use with certain games, similar to DLC.
- Tech Q&A - A section which asks and answers questions behind product development and the PlayStation's technological capabilities.
- Debriefing - Video interviews with major video game designers who work with the PlayStation console.
- Behind the Scenes - A look at the "making of" video games, commercial spots, etc.
- Event Center - A highlight of current happenings in the PlayStation brand, promotions and marketing events.
- Bulletins - Exclusive special notices and opportunities for PlayStation Underground club members.
- Transmission - A feature showcasing upcoming features and contests.
- Alphas - Exclusive previews and premieres of upcoming games.
- Hidden Content - Each issue had various Easter Eggs hidden throughout the sections including cheat codes, game movies, and game demos.

=== Disc two ===
The second disc contains mostly demos of upcoming games as well as game trailers. For example, in the second issue of PlayStation Underground the second disc was a Square themed disc containing demos to Final Fantasy VII and Bushido Blade as well as exclusive upcoming trailers of new Square games.

== Jampack ==
Jampack was a series of video game compilation discs produced by Sony Computer Entertainment America and released under the PlayStation Underground brand. (Note: The "Underground" name was not used on the first two Jampack discs, which were simply titled Jampack Vol. 1 and Jampack Vol. 2.) The discs featured game demos, interviews, and cheat codes for PlayStation games, and were distributed via retailers and the PlayStation Underground subscription service, with the first volume released in July 1997.

The series previewed many popular games from the PS2's lifespan, ranging from SSX Tricky and Final Fantasy X to Need for Speed Underground and Tony Hawk's Pro Skater 3. Many of the later PS2 Jampack volumes were issued with the option of a counterpart that removed or replaced any demos for mature-rated and some teen-rated games, essentially serving as a clean version of the compilations.

=== Volumes ===
Title	Demos	Notes
Jampack Vol. 1	Codename: Tenka, Dynasty Warriors, Herc's Adventures, Machine Hunter, MDK, NBA ShootOut '97, Pitfall 3D: Beyond the Jungle, Rage Racer, Rally Cross, Super Puzzle Fighter II Turbo, The Lost World: Jurassic Park, Thunder Truck Rally	Videos: Wild Arms (video game), Ogre Battle: The March of the Black Queen, and Steel Reign (hidden code only)
Jampack Vol. 2	Bravo Air Race, Colony Wars, Cool Boarders 2, Fighting Force, I.Q.: Intelligent Qube, NFL GameDay 98, Nightmare Creatures, Nuclear Strike, PaRappa the Rapper, Test Drive 4, Tomb Raider II, Vs.	Videos (with hidden codes only): One, Gex: Enter the Gecko, and Pandemonium 2
Jampack	Blasto, Duke Nukem: Time to Kill, Gran Turismo, Hot Shots Golf, Jersey Devil, Tekken 3,Test Drive 5, Tomba!	First PS1 volume June 1, 1998
Jampack Winter '98	A Bug's Life, Cool Boarders 3, MediEvil, Metal Gear Solid, NFL GameDay 99, NHL FaceOff 99, Rally Cross 2, Small Soldiers, Spyro the Dragon, Tomb Raider III	Imports: Irritating Stick; the fifteenth best-selling home console title in the United States in its first month of release.
Jampack Summer '99	3Xtreme, Ape Escape, Bloody Roar 2, MLB 2000, R4: Ridge Racer Type 4, The Next Tetris, Tony Hawk's Pro Skater, Xena: Warrior Princess	Imports: Gangway Monsters
Jampack Winter '99	Cool Boarders 4, Gran Turismo 2, NFL GameDay 2000, NHL FaceOff 2000, Sled Storm, Spyro 2: Ripto's Rage!, Thrasher Presents Skate and Destroy, Tiny Tank, Tomba! 2: The Evil Swine Return, Toy Story 2: Buzz Lightyear to the Rescue, UmJammer Lammy	
Jampack Summer 2K	Grind Session, Hot Shots Golf 2, MediEvil 2, NASCAR Rumble, Speed Punks, Spider-Man, Syphon Filter 2, The Legend of Dragoon, Tomba! 2: The Evil Swine Return, Tony Hawk's Pro Skater 2	Imports: Ore no Ryouri
Jampack Winter 2000	102 Dalmatians Puppies to the Rescue, Army Men: Air Attack 2, Cool Boarders 2001, Crash Bash, Madden NFL 2001, Mat Hoffman's Pro BMX, Spider-Man, Spyro: Year of the Dragon, Sydney 2000	
Jampack Summer 2001	ATV Offroad Fury, Cool Boarders 2001, Gauntlet Dark Legacy, Ico, Klonoa 2: Lunatea's Veil, Legacy of Kain: Soul Reaver 2, MX 2002 featuring Ricky Carmichael, Red Faction, Star Wars: Starfighter, Zone of the Enders	First PS2 volume
Jampack Fall 2001	Aladdin in Nasira's Revenge, Atlantis: The Lost Empire, Barbie: Explorer, NFL GameDay 2002, Spider-Man 2: Enter Electro, X-Men: Mutant Academy 2	Final PS1 volume
Jampack Winter 2001	Baldur's Gate: Dark Alliance, Drakan: The Ancients' Gates, Dynasty Warriors 3, Extermination, Final Fantasy X, Kinetica, SSX Tricky	Videos: Jak and Daxter: The Precursor Legacy, Okage: Shadow King, Splashdown, and Tony Hawk's Pro Skater 3
Jampack Summer 2002	Crash Bandicoot: The Wrath of Cortex, Freekstyle, Frequency, Half-Life, Hot Shots Golf 3, Jak and Daxter: The Precursor Legacy, PaRappa the Rapper 2, Star Wars: Jedi Starfighter, TimeSplitters 2	Videos: Jak and Daxter: The Precursor Legacy, Kingdom Hearts, SOCOM U.S. Navy SEALs
Jampack Winter 2002	Primal^{†}, Ratchet and Clank, SOCOM U.S. Navy SEALs^{†}, Sly Cooper and the Thievius Raccoonus, Street Hoops*, Stuntman*, The Mark of Kri^{†}, Tony Hawk's Pro Skater 4, Wild Arms 3	Videos: Rygar: The Legendary Adventure, Tomb Raider: The Angel of Darkness, Treasure Planet, War of the Monsters
Jampack Summer 2003	ATV Offroad Fury 2, Amplitude, Jet X2O*, MLB 2004, Primal^{†}, Silent Hill 3^{†}, The Getaway^{†}, Tom Clancy's Splinter Cell*, War of the Monsters, World Tour Soccer 2003	Videos: Downhill Domination*, Jak II*, NBA Street Vol. 2, Syphon Filter: The Omega Strain^{†}
Jampack Winter 2003	Castlevania: Lament of Innocence^{†}, DDR Max 2, Downhill Domination*, Finding Nemo*, James Bond 007: Everything or Nothing^{†}, Jet Li: Rise to Honor^{†}, NCAA GameBreaker 2004, NFL GameDay 2004, Need for Speed: Underground, Prince of Persia: Sands of Time*, Ratchet & Clank: Going Commando, SOCOM II: U.S. Navy SEALs^{†}, Syphon Filter: The Omega Strain^{†}, Teenage Mutant Ninja Turtles*, Whiplash, XIII^{†}	Videos: EyeToy: Play
Jampack Volume 10	Front Mission 4, Jet Li: Rise to Honor, MLB 2005, MX Unleashed, Mission: Impossible – Operation Surma*, NBA ShootOut 2004, Psi-Ops: The Mindgate Conspiracy^{†}, Syphon Filter: The Omega Strain^{†}, Tom Clancy's Ghost Recon: Jungle Storm*, Transformers, World Soccer Winning Eleven 7	
Jampack Volume 11	Ace Combat 5: The Unsung War, Area 51^{†}, ATV Offroad Fury 3, Burnout 3: Takedown, Champions: Return to Arms, Crash Twinsanity*, Def Jam: Fight for NY^{†}, Dog's Life*, Ghost in the Shell: Stand Alone Complex^{†}, Jak 3, Killzone^{†}, Metal Gear Solid 3: Snake Eater^{†}, NCAA Football 2005*, Ratchet & Clank: Up Your Arsenal, Robotech: Invasion*, Silent Hill 4: The Room^{†}, Star Wars: Battlefront, Suikoden IV*, Tak 2: The Staff of Dreams*	Videos: Grand Theft Auto: San Andreas^{†}
Jampack Volume 12	Delta Force: Black Hawk Down, Fight Night Round 2, Cold Winter^{†}, God of War (2005 video game)^{†}, Juiced, Lego Star Wars: The Video Game, MLB 2006, Madagascar*, Robots*, Stolen	Videos: EyeToy: AntiGrav
Jampack Volume 13	Brothers in Arms: Earned in Blood^{†}, Burnout Revenge, Castlevania: Curse of Darkness^{†}, Genji: Dawn of the Samurai^{†}, Jak X: Combat Racing, Ratchet Deadlocked, Shadow of the Colossus, Sly 3: Honor Among Thieves, Soulcalibur III, The Chronicles of Narnia: The Lion, the Witch and the Wardrobe, Tiger Woods PGA Tour 2006*, NHL 2006*, Peter Jackson's King Kong'*, We Love Katamari*, Karaoke Revolution Party*	
Jampack Volume 14	Black^{†}, Drakengard 2^{†}, Driver: Parallel Lines^{†}, EyeToy: Operation Spy, Hitman: Blood Money^{†}, MLB 06: The Show, Ōkami, Ratchet: Deadlocked, Shadow Hearts: From The New World*, Shadow of the Colossus, Tomb Raider Legend, Steambot Chronicles*, Beatmania*, Pac-Man World Rally*	Videos: Tourist Trophy
Jampack Volume 15	Destroy All Humans! 2, Lego Star Wars II, MLB 06: The Show, Need for Speed: Carbon, Ōkami, Yakuza^{†}, Bionicle Heroes*, One Piece Grand Adventure*, The Grim Adventures of Billy and Mandy*, Kim Possible What's the Switch?*	
* – Impacted by the RP-T version · † – Impacted by the RP-M version
