= NBA ShootOut =

Series of basketball video games

NBA ShootOut (Total NBA in Europe) is a series of basketball video games based on the NBA and released for the PlayStation and PlayStation 2. It was one of Sony's first-party sports franchises for the PlayStation, along with NHL FaceOff, NFL GameDay, NCAA GameBreaker and ESPN Extreme Games. The first two entries, released in 1996 and 1997, were developed by Sony Computer Entertainment's British in-house development team. Later entries were developed by 989 Sports, including NBA ShootOut 2000, the only game in the series to be released for Microsoft Windows.

In the games, players can choose an existing NBA franchise and play exhibition or regular season games, as well as create their own players to include in regular season team rosters. Charles Barkley, Shaquille O'Neal and Michael Jordan were represented in the game with other names (Forward, Center and Guard respectively).

NBA ShootOut 99 for the PlayStation was cancelled by 989 Sports due to its level of quality.

== Games ==
Title	Release date	Console(s)	Cover athlete
NBA ShootOut	March 10, 1996	PlayStation	Sam Cassell
NBA ShootOut '97	March 14, 1997	PlayStation	Eddie Jones; Toni Kukoč (Limited Edition)
NBA ShootOut 98	February 28, 1998	PlayStation	Hakeem Olajuwon
NBA ShootOut 2000	November 30, 1999	PlayStation	Jason Kidd
NBA ShootOut 2001	October 17, 2000	PlayStation, PlayStation 2	Chris Webber
NBA ShootOut 2002	September 1, 2001	PlayStation	Stephon Marbury
NBA ShootOut 2003	September 24, 2002	PlayStation, PlayStation 2	Ray Allen
NBA ShootOut 2004	September 23, 2003	PlayStation, PlayStation 2	Tracy McGrady

== Reception ==
The first two games were well received, with the Official UK PlayStation Magazine awarding 9/10 and a Starplayer award to both. They praised the motion capture and the playability.

== See also ==
- ESPN NBA Hangtime '95, Sony's predecessor for Sega CD
