= Chris Porter (basketball) =

American basketball player (born 1978)

Personal information
- Born: May 9, 1978 (age 48) Abbeville, Alabama, U.S.
- Listed height: 6 ft 7 in (2.01 m)
- Listed weight: 218 lb (99 kg)

Career information
- High school: Abbeville (Abbeville, Alabama)
- College: Chipola (1996–1998); Auburn (1998–2000)
- NBA draft: 2000: 2nd round, 55th overall pick
- Drafted by: Golden State Warriors
- Playing career: 2000–2016
- Position: Small forward
- Number: 4

Career history
- 2000–2001: Golden State Warriors
- 2002: Dakota Wizards
- 2002: Oklahoma Storm
- 2002: Carifac Fabriano
- 2003: Dakota Wizards
- 2003: Gigantes de Carolina
- 2003: Oklahoma Storm
- 2003–2004: Oliveirense Simoldes
- 2004: Dakota Wizards
- 2004: Oklahoma Storm
- 2004–2005: Dakota Wizards
- 2005: Daegu Orions
- 2005: Fujian Xunxing
- 2005–2006: Barangay Ginebra Kings
- 2006–2010: Fujian Xunxing
- 2011: Powerade Tigers
- 2011–2012: Las Vegas Aces
- 2012–2015: Fort Wayne Mad Ants
- 2014: Texas Lone Star Strikers
- 2016: Hawke's Bay Hawks

Career highlights
- NBA D-League champion (2014); 2× CBA champion (2002, 2004); USBL champion (2002); Consensus second-team All-American (1999); SEC Player of the Year (1999); SEC Rookie of the Year (1999); First-team All-SEC (1999); Second-team All-SEC (2000)
- Stats at NBA.com
- Stats at Basketball Reference

Christopher Bernard Porter (born May 9, 1978) is an American former professional basketball player. Known for his large afro hairstyle and giant vertical leap, he created excitement early in his career with his dunking and rebounding abilities. Largely seen as too undersized to play power forward at the NBA level, his style fit in perfectly with coach Cliff Ellis' style of full court pressure while playing college basketball for the Auburn Tigers.

== Early life ==
Porter was born and raised in Abbeville, Alabama, a small town with "just three streetlights" and a few thousand people. He attended Abbeville High where he helped the school win the 4A State Championship as a senior. He subsequently earned 4A State Player of the Year honors.

== College career ==
Between 1996 and 1998, Porter played college basketball for Chipola College where he earned JUCO All-American honors. He then played two years for Auburn University, helping them reach the NCAA Sweet Sixteen in 1998–99, Porter's junior season. He was named SEC Player of the Year that season and was selected to the All-America team. The following year, Porter was pictured on the cover of Sports Illustrated as the Auburn Tigers were picked to win the national title. However, true to the Sports Illustrated cover jinx, the Tigers struggled and Porter was suspended for the last eight games of the season for accepting money from an agent while still in college. Porter reportedly accepted $2,500 to save his mother from being evicted from her home and claimed he did not know the person was affiliated with any sports agency.

== Professional career ==
=== NBA ===
Porter was selected with the 55th overall pick in the 2000 NBA draft by the Golden State Warriors. As a rookie in 2000–01, he averaged 8.6 points, 3.7 rebounds and 1.2 assists in 51 games. His season was hindered, however, by a nagging sprained left ankle. Despite a solid rookie season, the 2001 off-season proved to be Porter's downfall from the NBA. After showing up three days late to the Warriors' summer camp, followed by an off-the-court arrest, Porter was traded to the Charlotte Hornets in a three-team, eight-player deal on October 25, 2001, just days prior to the start of the 2001–02 season. However, Porter missed his flight the next morning from Oakland, California, which the Hornets said was enough reason to waive him on the spot. With pending drug charges against him from an August arrest in Alabama in which police stopped him and found cocaine, marijuana and a handgun in his car, the Hornets refused to give Porter any leeway. Porter would never play in the NBA after the 2000 - 2001 season with his final game being on April 18, 2001, in an 81 - 95 loss to the Vancouver Grizzlies. In his final game, Porter recorded a double-double (14 points and 11 rebounds) as the Warriors starting small forward.

=== CBA, USBL, Italy and Portugal ===
In January 2002, Porter signed with the Dakota Wizards of the Continental Basketball Association. In 24 games for Dakota in 2001–02, he averaged 16.4 points, 6.6 rebounds, 1.8 assists and 1.7 steals per game, helping the team win the 2002 CBA championship. Following the CBA season, he had a six-game stint with the Oklahoma Storm of the United States Basketball League, helping the team win the 2002 USBL championship.

In August 2002, Porter signed with Carifac Fabriano of the Lega Basket Serie A. His stint with the Italian club lasted just 10 games, averaging 12.9 points, 4.8 rebounds and 1.5 assists per game. In January 2003, he re-joined the Dakota Wizards. Later that year, he had stint in Puerto Rico with Gigantes de Carolina and again played for the Oklahoma Storm.

For the 2003–04 season, Porter moved to Portugal where he played for Oliveirense Simoldes. His stint lasted until January 2004 when he was released by the club. He went on to play for both the Dakota Wizards and Oklahoma Storm once again during 2004. In 2004–05, he split the season playing for the Dakota Wizards and Korean team Daegu Orions.

=== China and Philippines ===
For the 2005–06 season, Porter moved to China where he joined Fujian Xunxing. He played 10 games for Fujian before departing the club in December 2005 and joining the Barangay Ginebra Kings of the Philippine Basketball Association (PBA). He led the team through to the semi-finals of the 2006 PBA Playoffs before they lost their series 4–3 to rival and eventual champion, the Red Bull Barako.

Porter returned to China for the 2006–07 season, re-joining Fujian Xunxing. In 29 games for the club in 2006–07, he averaged 22 points and 13 rebounds per game. In January 2007, he played for the CBA All-Stars in a two-game exhibition series against the Korean Basketball League All-Stars. Porter scored 17 points in Game 1, and 13 points in Game 2, with the CBA losing both games. He again played for Fujian in 2007–08, but he managed just 15 games before departing the club in December 2007. He returned to Fujian in 2008, playing for the club until December 2010 when he was released half-way through the 2010–11 season due to an injury.

In June 2011, Porter joined the Powerade Tigers for the 2011 PBA Governors' Cup.

=== NBA D-League ===
After a stint in the ABA for the Las Vegas Aces in 2011–12, Porter began a successful three-year run with the Fort Wayne Mad Ants of the NBA Development League between December 2012 and April 2015, winning a championship with the team in 2013–14. In 126 regular season games for the Mad Ants over three seasons, Porter averaged 6.1 points, 4.6 rebounds and 1.1 steals in 17.8 minutes per game.

In June 2014, Porter had a one-game stint with the Texas Lone Star Strikers of the International Basketball League.

=== New Zealand ===
On January 19, 2016, Porter signed with the Hawke's Bay Hawks for the 2016 New Zealand NBL season. Named co-captain of the team alongside Aidan Daly, he made his debut for the Hawks in the team's season opener on March 13. In 26 minutes of action as a starter, he recorded a team-high 21 points and 6 rebounds in an 89–74 loss to the Wellington Saints. On March 24, he recorded a double-double with 22 points and 10 rebounds against the Southland Sharks. Four days later, he recorded a second consecutive double-double with 23 points and 10 rebounds against the Canterbury Rams. After going 0–4 over their first four games, things got worse for the Hawks on April 3 with Porter being ruled out for the rest of the season with a hamstring injury. In those four games, Porter averaged 18.3 points, 8.0 rebounds, 1.0 assists and 1.5 steals per game.

== Career statistics ==
=== NBA ===
Year	Team	GP	GS	MPG	FG%	3P%	FT%	RPG	APG	SPG	BPG	PPG
2000–01	Golden State	51	35	22.5	.389	.000	.667	3.7	1.2	0.9	0.1	8.6

=== College ===
Year	Team	GP	GS	MPG	FG%	3P%	FT%	RPG	APG	SPG	BPG	PPG
1998–99	Auburn	30	30	28.7	.470	.364	.631	8.6	1.1	2.1	0.4	16.0
1999–00	Auburn	26	26	29.0	.464	.235	.676	7.3	1.2	2.0	0.4	14.6
Career		56	56	28.9	.467	.308	.651	8.0	1.1	2.1	0.4	15.3

== Other media ==
Porter has appeared as a playable character in the video games ESPN NBA 2Night, NBA 2K1, NBA Hoopz, NBA Live 2001 (PS2 & PC versions), NBA Live 2002, NBA ShootOut 2001 (PS1 version only) and NBA ShootOut 2002.

== Drug arrests ==
Porter has been arrested numerous times due to drug possession. The first time was in August 2001 when Alabama police found small plastic bags of cocaine and marijuana in the car he was driving. In April 2006, Alabama police charged him with driving under the influence and second-degree possession of marijuana. In November 2010, he pleaded guilty in Houston County Circuit Court to a misdemeanor marijuana charge. In January 2021, Porter was arrested by the Dothan Police Department for 1st degree sexual abuse. Arrest record show the charge stems from an allegation that he fondled a female teenager (18 years of age).
