= 989 Studios =

Video game developer and publisher

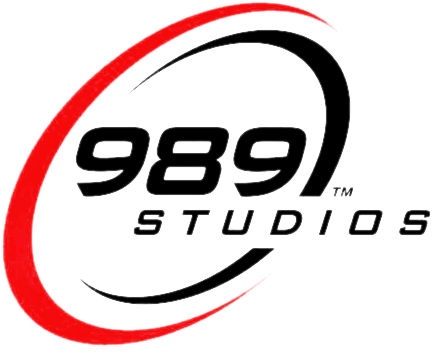
- Formerly: Sony Interactive Studios America (1995–1998)
- Type: Subsidiary
- Industry: Video games
- Predecessor: Sony Imagesoft
- Founded: August 17, 1995; 31 years ago (original); 2001; 25 years ago (relaunch)
- Defunct: 2000 (original); 2005 (relaunch)
- Fate: Dissolved following a merger with Sony Computer Entertainment America
- Headquarters: Foster City, California, United States
- Parent: Sony Interactive Entertainment (1995–1997); Sony Computer Entertainment America (1997–2000)

989 Studios was a division of Sony Computer Entertainment America (SCEA) that developed games for PlayStation consoles and Windows personal computers. Their games include EverQuest, Twisted Metal III, Twisted Metal 4, Syphon Filter, Syphon Filter 2, Jet Moto 3, Bust a Groove, and others.

== History ==
The 989 Sports name developed from a long history of name changes and corporate shuffling within Sony centered around operations in Foster City, California.

=== As Sony Interactive Studios America ===
On August 17, 1995, the video game business of Sony Imagesoft was merged with the product development branch of SCEA, renaming to Sony Interactive Studios America (SISA) and the PC division of Sony Imagesoft became Sony Interactive PC Software America, which was consolidated with the US PC arm of Psygnosis, led by Ray Sangler, with Sony Interactive Sports launching as the sports label. The unit was continued to be run by president Kelly Flock, who improves to run it, after being formerly operated under the Sony Imagesoft name. The parent company itself, Sony Electronic Publishing, was then renamed to Sony Interactive Entertainment.

In 1996, the name Sony Interactive PC Software America was dropped in favor of using the SISA and Psygnosis brand names for PC, also dropping the Sony Imagesoft logo, while the following year, Twisted Metal 2 and Jet Moto went into multiplayer for PC. In early 1997, all assets of SCEA, SCEE and SISA, the production arm was transferred from complete control from Sony Interactive Entertainment to Sony Computer Entertainment.

Development offices continued to be operated in San Diego, California. In mid 1995, SingleTrac decided to extend its contract with Sony to develop its 3D game technology. In December 1995, SingleTrac, a game developer affiliated when the studio was Sony Imagesoft, extended its deal with SISA for two additional games for the studio, which included the Jet Moto games. In 1996, members of the NHL FaceOff team at SISA left to form an independent game developer, Killer Game. Some members left Killer Game to form SolWorks in 1998.

In 1997, team members from SISA leave to form an independent game developer, RedZone Interactive. Also that year, team members leave SISA to form an independent game developer, Idol Minds. In late 1997, the company signed a deal with upstart Don Traeger Productions to develop games for PlayStation, and its first title will be an action sports title. Only one title, Jet Moto 3, came out of the deal as the studio, who by then, was Pacific Coast Power and Light, was sold to THQ. Also that year, development of the NBA ShootOut series was transferred from the London SCEE studio to the San Diego studio of SISA.

=== Spin-off and reorganization as 989 Studios ===
In 1998, SISA was spun off from SCEA, with the intent to became an autonomous and independent video game publisher and brand label for SCEA in a similar manner Psygnosis operated from SCEE and the video game division of Sony Music Entertainment Japan operating from SCEI, and given its own marketing team with Sony handling distribution functions, after having its titles being published and marketed by SCEA and later on, it was renamed 989 Studios, and its sports label was renamed to 989 Sports.

The online division of 989 was spun off as RedEye Interactive, which was later renamed to Verant Interactive in 1999 due to domain issues, before it was sold to Sony Online Entertainment in 2000. Psygnosis' North American operations were eventually merged into 989 Studios as its European operations of the company was sold off to Eidos Interactive. In late 1998, the studio established a development office in Santa Monica, and took over production and design of its development of most non-sports titles from Foster City, while its sports titles and some general titles were remained to be in its own San Diego studio.

The company made its first hit as an independent game publisher with Bust a Groove, a localization of Enix's Bust a Move, which was renamed for obvious reasons due to Acclaim already using the title and it came with a major marketing campaign. In 1999, the company made its breakout title as an independent game publisher with Syphon Filter, to critical acclaim.

On April 1, 2000, 989 Studios was merged back into SCEA as a first party development group, in order to prepare for the then-upcoming PlayStation 2. Most of its employees had left its company, including president Kelly Flock. After 989 was dissolved, the Santa Monica development team became Santa Monica Studio and the San Diego sports and general development team became San Diego Studio.

SCEA continued to release sports games under the 989 Sports brand until the brand was retired in 2005 and all future sports games continued to be published under SCEA and it was renamed to SCEA Sports Studio. During the days when 989 Sports was a SCEA label, the company managed the European import Formula One 2001, after being previously published by Psygnosis as an independent publisher, then Midway for Formula One 2000, and the World Tour Soccer games, which were localizations of the previously European-exclusive This is Football series, in addition to titles created by the San Diego studios. In 2003, the label launched 989 Sports Online, which was later shuttered after 989 Sports was folded into SCEA itself.

== Games published or produced ==
Title	Platform	Genre	Release date	Developer	References
2Xtreme	PlayStation	Racing	November 8, 1996	Sony Interactive Studios America	
3Xtreme	PlayStation	Racing	April 21, 1999	989 Studios	
Blasto	PlayStation	Third-person shooter	April 16, 1998	Sony Interactive Studios America	
Bust a Groove	PlayStation	Rhythm	November 25, 1998	Metro	
Cardinal Syn	PlayStation	Fighting	August 25, 1998	Kronos Digital Entertainment	
CART World Series	PlayStation	Racing	October 1997	Sony Interactive Studios America	
Cool Boarders 3	PlayStation	Snowboarding	October 27, 1998	Idol Minds	
Cool Boarders 4	PlayStation	Snowboarding	October 26, 1999	Idol Minds	
CyberStrike 2	Microsoft Windows	Mech simulation	November 17, 1998	Simutronics	
ESPN Extreme Games	PlayStation	Racing	September 9, 1995	Sony Interactive Studios America	
ESPN Extreme Games	MS-DOS	Racing	February 27, 1996	Sony Interactive Studios America	
EverQuest	Microsoft Windows	Massively multiplayer online role-playing game	March 16, 1999	989 Studios	
Formula One 2001	PlayStation 2	Racing	October 2, 2001	Studio Liverpool	
Jet Moto	PlayStation	Racing	November 8, 1996	SingleTrac	
Jet Moto 2	PlayStation	Racing	November 11, 1997	SingleTrac	
Jet Moto 3	PlayStation	Racing	August 30, 1999	Pacific Coast Power & Light	
MLB Pennant Race	PlayStation	Sports	October 14, 1996	Sony Interactive Studios America	
MLB '98	PlayStation	Sports	August 1997	Sony Interactive Studios America	
MLB '99	PlayStation	Sports	April 14, 1998	Sony Interactive Studios America	
MLB 2000	PlayStation	Sports	March 29, 1999	989 Sports	
MLB 2001	PlayStation	Sports	March 28, 2000	989 Sports	
MLB 2002	PlayStation	Sports	May 7, 2001	San Diego Studio	
MLB 2003	PlayStation	Sports	June 17, 2002	San Diego Studio	
MLB 2004	PlayStation	Sports	April 30, 2003	San Diego Studio	
MLB 2004	PlayStation 2	Sports	March 10, 2003	San Diego Studio	
MLB 2005	PlayStation	Sports	March 16, 2004	San Diego Studio	
MLB 2005	PlayStation 2	Sports	March 16, 2004	San Diego Studio	
MLB 2006	PlayStation 2	Sports	March 8, 2005	San Diego Studio	
MLB 2006	PlayStation Portable	Sports	April 12, 2005	San Diego Studio	
NBA ShootOut	PlayStation	Sports	March 28, 1996	Sony Computer Entertainment Europe	
NBA ShootOut '97	PlayStation	Sports	March 11, 1997	Sony Computer Entertainment Europe	
NBA ShootOut 98	PlayStation	Sports	March 11, 1998	Sony Interactive Studios America	
NBA ShootOut 2000	PlayStation	Sports	December 21, 1999	989 Sports	
NBA ShootOut 2001	PlayStation	Sports	October 24, 2000	Killer Game	
NBA ShootOut 2001	PlayStation 2	Sports	February 21, 2001	San Diego Studio	
NBA ShootOut 2002	PlayStation	Sports	September 21, 2001	Killer Game	
NBA ShootOut 2003	PlayStation	Sports	September 24, 2002	Killer Game	
NBA ShootOut 2003	PlayStation 2	Sports	September 24, 2002	San Diego Studio	
NBA ShootOut 2004	PlayStation	Sports	October 6, 2003	Killer Game	
NBA ShootOut 2004	PlayStation 2	Sports	October 29, 2003	San Diego Studio	
NBA	PlayStation Portable	Sports	March 24, 2005	San Diego Studio	
NCAA Gamebreaker	PlayStation	Sports	September 19, 1996	Sony Interactive Studios America	
NCAA Gamebreaker 98	PlayStation	Sports	November 21, 1997	Sony Interactive Studios America	
NCAA GameBreaker 99	PlayStation	Sports	October 27, 1998	Red Zone Interactive, Inc.	
NCAA GameBreaker 2000	PlayStation	Sports	August 11, 1999	Red Zone Interactive, Inc.	
NCAA GameBreaker 2001	PlayStation	Sports	August 22, 2000	Red Zone Interactive, Inc.	
NCAA GameBreaker 2001	PlayStation 2	Sports	December 19, 2000	Red Zone Interactive, Inc.	
NCAA GameBreaker 2003	PlayStation 2	Sports	August 13, 2002	San Diego Studio (Note: Developed under the Red Zone Interactive name)	
NCAA GameBreaker 2004	PlayStation 2	Sports	August 26, 2003	San Diego Studio	
NCAA Final Four 99	PlayStation	Sports	January 13, 1999	Killer Game	
NCAA Final Four 2000	PlayStation	Sports	November 17, 1999	Killer Game	
NCAA Final Four 2001	PlayStation	Sports	November 16, 2000	Killer Game	
NCAA Final Four 2001	PlayStation 2	Sports	December 19, 2000	Killer Game	
NCAA Final Four 2002	PlayStation 2	Sports	November 12, 2001	Killer Game	
NCAA Final Four 2003	PlayStation 2	Sports	November 27, 2002	Killer Game	
NCAA Final Four 2004	PlayStation 2	Sports	November 11, 2003	Killer Game	
NFL GameDay	PlayStation	Sports	December 4, 1995	Sony Interactive Studios America	
NFL GameDay '97	PlayStation	Sports	December 4, 1996	Sony Interactive Studios America	
NFL GameDay 98	PlayStation	Sports	September 1997	Sony Interactive Studios America	
NFL GameDay 99	PlayStation	Sports	August 25, 1998	Red Zone Interactive, Inc.	
NFL GameDay 99	Microsoft Windows	Sports	September 1998	Red Zone Interactive, Inc.	
NFL GameDay 2000	PlayStation	Sports	August 11, 1999	Red Zone Interactive, Inc.	
NFL GameDay 2001	PlayStation	Sports	August 15, 2000	Red Zone Interactive, Inc.	
NFL GameDay 2001	PlayStation 2	Sports	November 16, 2000	Red Zone Interactive, Inc.	
NFL GameDay 2002	PlayStation	Sports	August 7, 2001	San Diego Studio (Note: Developed under the Red Zone Interactive name)	
NFL GameDay 2002	PlayStation 2	Sports	December 4, 2001	San Diego Studio	
NFL GameDay 2003	PlayStation	Sports	August 13, 2002	San Diego Studio	
NFL GameDay 2003	PlayStation 2	Sports	August 13, 2002	San Diego Studio	
NFL GameDay 2004	PlayStation	Sports	August 26, 2003	San Diego Studio	
NFL GameDay 2004	PlayStation 2	Sports	August 26, 2003	San Diego Studio	
NFL GameDay 2005	PlayStation	Sports	August 1, 2004	San Diego Studio	
NFL Xtreme	PlayStation	Sports	July 13, 1998	989 Sports	
NFL Xtreme 2	PlayStation	Sports	July 20, 1999	989 Sports	
NHL FaceOff	PlayStation	Sports	December 19, 1995	Sony Interactive Studios America	
NHL FaceOff '97	PlayStation	Sports	October 22, 1996	Killer Game	
NHL FaceOff 98	PlayStation	Sports	October 31, 1997	Killer Game	
NHL FaceOff 99	PlayStation	Sports	September 30, 1998	Killer Game	
NHL FaceOff 2000	PlayStation	Sports	September 15, 1999	SolWorks	
NHL FaceOff 2001	PlayStation	Sports	September 5, 2000	SolWorks	
NHL FaceOff 2001	PlayStation 2	Sports	February 6, 2001	SolWorks	
NHL FaceOff 2003	PlayStation 2	Sports	November 5, 2002	SolWorks	
Gretzky NHL 2005	PlayStation 2	Sports	November 9, 2004	Page 44 Studios	
Gretzky NHL 2005	PlayStation Portable	Sports	March 14, 2005	Page 44 Studios	
Rally Cross	PlayStation	Racing	February 28, 1997	Sony Interactive Studios America	
Rally Cross 2	PlayStation	Racing	November 1998	Idol Minds	
Running Wild	PlayStation	Racing	October 6, 1998	Universal Interactive Studios/Blue Shift	
Spawn: The Eternal	PlayStation	Beat 'em up	December 9, 1997	Sony Interactive Studios America	
Steel Reign	PlayStation	Vehicular combat	October 9, 1997	Chantemar Creations	
Supercross Circuit	PlayStation	Racing	November 9, 1999	Idol Minds	
Syphon Filter	PlayStation	Third-person shooter	February 17, 1999	Eidetic	
Syphon Filter 2	PlayStation	Third-person shooter	March 14, 2000	Eidetic	
Tanarus	Microsoft Windows	Multiplayer first-person shooter	December 12, 1997	Sony Interactive Studios America	
Twisted Metal	PlayStation	Vehicular combat	September 9, 1995	SingleTrac	
Twisted Metal 2	PlayStation	Vehicular combat	November 8, 1996	SingleTrac	
Twisted Metal 2	Microsoft Windows	Vehicular combat	November 13, 1997	SingleTrac	
Twisted Metal III	PlayStation	Vehicular combat	November 10, 1998	989 Studios	
Twisted Metal 4	PlayStation	Vehicular combat	November 16, 1999	989 Studios	
Warhawk	PlayStation	Combat flight simulation	September 9, 1995	SingleTrac	
World Tour Soccer 2002	PlayStation 2	Sports	February 17, 2002	Team Soho	
World Tour Soccer 2003	PlayStation 2	Sports	February 10, 2003	London Studio	
World Tour Soccer 2005	PlayStation 2	Sports	April 13, 2004	London Studio	

== Games unreleased ==
Title	Platform	Genre	Release date	Notes
Big Guns (Exodus)	PlayStation	Action	Unreleased	Developed by Neversoft Entertainment, cancelled in November 1997
Jet Moto 2124	PlayStation	Racing	Unreleased	Developed by Pacific Coast Power & Light
NBA ShootOut 99	PlayStation	Sports	Unreleased	Cancelled in early 1999
Xena: Warrior Princess	PlayStation	Action	Unreleased	Publishing rights sold to Electronic Arts
Virus	PlayStation	Action	Unreleased	Cancelled in late 1995

== See also ==
- 989 Sports Major League Baseball series
- Sony Imagesoft
- Sony Computer Entertainment
