= NCAA GameBreaker 2001 =

2000 video game

- Cover art featuring Ron Dayne
- Developers: Red Zone Interactive; 989 Sports
- Publisher: Sony Computer Entertainment
- Series: NCAA GameBreaker
- Platforms: PlayStation, PlayStation 2
- Release: PlayStation: NA: August 22, 2000; PlayStation 2: NA: December 19, 2000
- Genre: Sports
- Modes: Single-player, multiplayer

NCAA GameBreaker 2001 is a 2000 American football video game developed by Red Zone Interactive in its last outing as an independent developer before merging to form the current San Diego Studio and 989 Sports and published by Sony Computer Entertainment for the PlayStation and PlayStation 2. It was only released in North America.

== Reception ==
Reception

Aggregate score
| Aggregator | Score | |
| Aggregator | PS | PS2 |
|---|---|---|
| Metacritic | 69/100 | 57/100 |

Review scores
| Publication | Score | |
| Publication | PS | PS2 |
|---|---|---|
| CNET Gamecenter | 7/10 | 5/10 |
| Electronic Gaming Monthly | 7.17/10 (Note: In Electronic Gaming Monthly's review of the PlayStation version, two critics gave it each a score of 7/10, and the other gave it 7.5/10.) | 3/10 (Note: Three critics of Electronic Gaming Monthly gave the PlayStation 2 version each a score of 4/10, 3/10, and 2/10.) |
| EP Daily | 8.5/10 | N/A |
| Game Informer | N/A | 3.25/10 |
| GameFan | 80% (Note: In GameFan's viewpoint of the PlayStation version, one critic gave it 84, and the other 75.) | N/A |
| GameSpot | 8.2/10 | 5.8/10 |
| GameSpy | 80% | 67% |
| IGN | 7.2/10 | 6.6/10 |
| Next Generation | N/A | 1/5 |
| Official U.S. PlayStation Magazine | 2.5/5 | 1.5/5 |
| Maxim | 2.5/5 | N/A |

The game received "mixed or average reviews" on both platforms according to the review aggregation website Metacritic. Dan Egger of NextGen said of the PlayStation 2 version, "Football fans would be best served by waiting until next year." (Ironically, the next PlayStation 2 game was not NCAA GameBreaker 2002 but NCAA GameBreaker 2003, which was released two years after this game.)

Uncle Dust of GamePro said of the PlayStation version in one review, "While this year's NCAA Football might offer a better Dynasty mode and more customization, NCAA GameBreaker 2001 grabs the championship with its fast, fun gameplay." (Note: GamePro gave the PlayStation version 4/5 for graphics, 3.5/5 for sound, and two 4.5/5 scores for control and fun factor in one review.) In another GamePro review, Cheat Monkey called it "a fine package that delivers some wild college football action. It's got all the game modes that a college fan would want, and though the sound and graphics are a bit behind the rest of the package, you'd have to be asleep not to get fired up for the college football in GameBreaker 2001." (Note: GamePro gave the PlayStation version two 3.5/5 scores for graphics and fun factor, 3/5 for sound, and 4.5/5 for control in another review.) Human Tornado said of the PlayStation 2 version, "If you want some freewheeling college gridiron action this year, then GameBreaker 2001 is the only PS2 game in town." (Note: GamePro gave the PlayStation 2 version 3.5/5 for graphics, two 3/5 scores for sound and fun factor, and 4.5/5 for control.)
