= Pinball Heroes =

2009 video game

- game logo
- Developer: San Diego Studio
- Publisher: Sony Computer Entertainment
- Platforms: PlayStation Portable, PlayStation Vita
- Release: PlayStation Portable: NA: November 13, 2009; EU: March 26, 2010; PlayStation Vita: NA: July 2, 2013; EU: July 3, 2013
- Genre: Pinball
- Mode: Single-player

Pinball Heroes is a pinball video game developed by San Diego Studio and published by Sony Computer Entertainment for the PlayStation Portable. It was ported to the PlayStation Vita as Pinball Heroes: Complete in 2013. The original version was re-released on the PlayStation 4 and PlayStation 5 in 2022.

== Gameplay ==
Pinball Heroes is a simplistic pinball video game where points can be score by hitting objects with the ball. It exclusively features boards themed around PlayStation games at the time, including Uncharted: Drake's Fortune, Pain, High Velocity Bowling, Fat Princess, Wipeout HD Fury, ModNation Racers, Everybody's Golf and MotorStorm, each of which is purchasable as separate downloadable content, though one must be purchased first to access the game. They are bundled together for the Vita release, which also features a leaderboard and social network functionality.

== Reception ==
Sammy Barker of Push Square gave the re-released version a 6/10 score, praising its original ideas and implementation of other franchises into the gameplay, but he criticized its technical performance for being disappointingly low effort.
