= NFL GameDay 2001 =

2000 video game

- North American PS2 box art
- Developers: Red Zone Interactive; 989 Sports
- Publisher: Sony Computer Entertainment
- Director: Kelly Ryan
- Producer: Chris Gill
- Programmers: Matt Counte (PS); Kelly Walker (PS2)
- Writer: Pat Hegarty
- Composers: Tristan des Pres; Chuck Carr
- Series: NFL GameDay
- Platforms: PlayStation, PlayStation 2
- Release: PlayStation: NA: August 15, 2000; PlayStation 2: NA: November 16, 2000
- Genre: Sports
- Modes: Single-player, multiplayer

NFL GameDay 2001 is a 2000 American football video game developed by Red Zone Interactive and 989 Sports and published by Sony Computer Entertainment for the PlayStation and the PlayStation 2. On the cover is Marshall Faulk.

== Reception ==
Reception

Aggregate score
Aggregator	Score	
Aggregator	PS	PS2
Metacritic	73/100	51/100

Review scores
Publication	Score	
Publication	PS	PS2
CNET Gamecenter	N/A	5/10
Electronic Gaming Monthly	7/10 (Note: Three critics of Electronic Gaming Monthly gave the PlayStation version each a score of 6.5/10, 7/10, and 7.5/10.)	2.67/10 (Note: In Electronic Gaming Monthly's review of the PlayStation 2 version, one critic gave it a score of 2/10, and the rest gave it each a score of 3/10.)
EP Daily	8.5/10	6/10
Game Informer	7/10	3/10
GameFan	85% (Note: In GameFan's viewpoint of the PlayStation version, one critic gave it a score of 84, and the other 85.)	N/A
GameSpot	7.9/10	5.8/10
GameSpy	76%	69%
IGN	7.8/10	5.6/10
Next Generation	4/5	1/5
Official U.S. PlayStation Magazine	2.5/5	1/5
The Cincinnati Enquirer	N/A	2.5/5
Maxim	2.5/5	N/A

The game received "mixed or average reviews" on both platforms according to the review aggregation website Metacritic, though the PlayStation version was better received than the PlayStation 2 version. Bill Donohue of NextGen said of the former, "This game deserves a spot in your sports line-up, but everyone we know wants the PS2 version. Is this the end of the line for the PlayStation GameDay series?" Rob Smolka of the same magazine later changed his tune and said of the latter, "Even if all of the abundant flaws were to magically disappear, GameDay 2001 still wouldn't hold up against Madden 2001, which is much better-looking, has better control, features a lot more options, and, most importantly, is actually a finished product."

Dr. Zombie of GamePro's September 2000 issue said that the PlayStation version "flexes the PlayStation's muscles to the max." (Note: GamePro gave the PlayStation version two 4.5/5 scores for graphics and control, and two 5/5 scores for sound and fun factor.) Four issues later, however, Human Tornado said that the PlayStation 2 version "scores some points for its solid game options and a larger-than-life style that injects plenty of action into the gridiron game." (Note: GamePro gave the PlayStation 2 version three 3.5/5 scores for graphics, sound, and fun factor, and 4.5/5 for control.)

The PS2 version was a runner-up for the "Most Disappointing Game" award at GameSpot's Best and Worst of 2000 Awards, which went to Shenmue. The staff called the former "lackluster" and noted that Sony was "well known for producing superior sports games".
