= NCAA GameBreaker 99 =

1998 video game

- Cover art featuring Scott Frost
- Developer: Red Zone Interactive
- Publisher: 989 Studios
- Series: NCAA GameBreaker
- Platform: PlayStation
- Release: NA: October 27, 1998
- Genre: Sports
- Modes: Single-player, multiplayer

NCAA GameBreaker 99 is a 1998 American football video game developed by Red Zone Interactive and published by Sony Interactive Entertainment's 989 Studios for the PlayStation. It was released only in North America.

== Reception ==
Reception

Aggregate score
Aggregator	Score
GameRankings	79%

Review scores
Publication	Score
AllGame	4/5
Electronic Gaming Monthly	8.125/10
Game Informer	8/10
GameFan	71%
GamePro	4.5/5
GameRevolution	B
GameSpot	8.2/10
IGN	8.5/10
PlayStation: The Official Magazine	4.5/5

The game received "favorable" reviews according to the review aggregation website GameRankings.
