= Sony Interactive Entertainment (1991–1997) =

American interactive entertainment company owned by Sony

- Formerly: Sony Electronic Publishing (1991–1995)
- Type: Subsidiary
- Industry: Video games Electronic entertainment
- Founded: February 27, 1991; 35 years ago
- Founder: Olaf Olafsson
- Defunct: January 6, 1997
- Fate: Folded into Sony Computer Entertainment
- Headquarters: Los Angeles, California (1991–1992); Santa Monica, California (1992–1995); Foster City, California (1995–1997); New York City, New York (primary operations)
- Parent: Sony Corporation of America
- Divisions: Sony Interactive Studios America; Sony Interactive PC Software America; Psygnosis; Sony Multimedia Productions; Sony Publishers Data Corporation; Sony Recorded Media; Sony Electronic Publishing Ltd.

Sony Interactive Entertainment, Inc. (formerly Sony Electronic Publishing Company) was a video game and electronic entertainment products company that was formed in 1991 by Sony executive Olaf Olafsson to manage the services of CD-ROM and interactive products. It was primarily based in New York City, with additional operations based in Los Angeles and later Foster City.

== History ==
=== Sony Electronic Publishing Company ===
The company was originally founded in 1991 as a multimedia unit of Sony Corporation of America as a complement to Sony Pictures (formerly Columbia Pictures Entertainment) and Sony Music Entertainment, as a contemporary service used to provide interactive products as Sony Electronic Publishing Company.

The company's existing video game unit used to produce cartridges, CSG Imagesoft, was renamed into Sony Imagesoft and became part of the Electronic Publishing division, and even added a subsidiary Sony Electronic Entertainment. The company later expanded to run other divisions, like Sony Multimedia Productions, Sony Publishers Data Corporation and Sony Recorded Media.

Later that year, the company signed with Nintendo and intended to have the marketing a planned video game system only to be countered by Philips before being scrapped again.

On May 20, 1992, Sega of America and Sony Electronic Publishing announced a partnership to create content for Sega's consoles under the direction of Imagesoft. Besides Sega's cartridge-based Genesis and Game Gear consoles the partnership targeted the upcoming Sega CD peripheral. Also that year, the company signed a deal with Nintendo to develop patents for the next generation of products.

In 1992, the company launched a European business publishing subsidiary Sony Electronic Publishing, Ltd. and appointed Phil Harrison of Mindscape as director of product development. The company later started publishing video games under the Sony Imagesoft name.

In 1993, the company acquired successful British game publisher/developer Psygnosis, and ran as an autonomous video game publishing label, with Sony handling distribution of its titles. The acquisition cost Sony £20 million. In mid 1994, Sony Electronic Publishing's subsidiaries Sony Imagesoft and Psygnosis became early licensees for the PlayStation as it was autonomous from SCEA and SCEE. In August 1994, the parent company consolidated all PC software publishing divisions under the Sony Imagesoft name.

In May 1994, a division, Sony Computer Entertainment of America (SCEA) was established to handle the marketing of PlayStation in North America. In January 6, 1995, Sony Computer Entertainment Europe was founded in London, England as a division of Sony Electronic Publishing Ltd to handle the marketing of PlayStation in Europe, original development staff had little to no experience in the video game industry, with most of them being recent college graduates according to Next Generation magazine.

=== Sony Interactive Entertainment ===
Starting in July 1995, just two months prior to the release of the PlayStation console in Western markets, Sony Electronic Publishing restructured and renamed its divisions. The main Sony Electronic Publishing company was renamed to Sony Interactive Entertainment on August 17, 1995. All video game marketing from Sony Imagesoft was folded into Sony Computer Entertainment of America (SCEA), with about 100 employees transferred from Santa Monica to Foster City.

The video game business of Sony Imagesoft was merged with the product development branch of SCEA and it was renamed Sony Interactive Studios America on August 17, 1995, and also inherited the San Diego development team, which would later be renamed to 989 Studios again in 1998. The computer software business of Imagesoft became Sony Interactive PC Software America and was headed by general manager Ray Sangster. In August, the Los Angeles Times said Sony had canceled prior projects on computer and video game platforms other than its own PlayStation. It also said Psygnosis became Sony Interactive Europe, but never came to fruition.

As part of the restructuring program, Jeff Sagansky temporarily ran the company after Olaf Olafsson departed in 1995. In late 1995, Bruce Stein was appointed CEO and president of the company, only to move to Sony Pictures Entertainment via its new consumer products marketing group in 1996.

On January 6, 1997, the American and European divisions of SCE were both re-established as wholly owned subsidiaries of SCEI, with Sony Interactive Entertainment (formerly Sony Electronic Publishing) being folded as well to SCEI, with the game's copyrights and trademarks of franchises like Jet Moto and Twisted Metal being transferred from SIE to SCE, rendering SIE defunct. The name was reused when Sony Computer Entertainment was renamed to Sony Interactive Entertainment on April 1, 2016, 19 years after the old SIE was defunct.

== Divisions ==
- Sony Interactive Studios America
- Sony Interactive PC Software America
- Sony Interactive Sports
- Psygnosis
- Sony Multimedia Productions
- Sony Publishers Data Corporation
- Sony Recorded Media
- Sony Electronic Publishing Ltd.
- Sony Computer Entertainment of America
- Sony Computer Entertainment Europe
