= NCAA Final Four 2002 =

2001 video game

- Cover featuring Joseph Forte
- Developer: Killer Game
- Publisher: Sony Computer Entertainment
- Platform: PlayStation 2
- Release: NA: November 12, 2001
- Genre: Sports
- Modes: Single-player, multiplayer

NCAA Final Four 2002 is a 2001 basketball video game developed by Killer Game and published by Sony Computer Entertainment for the PlayStation 2. It was released only in North America under 989 Sports.

== Reception ==
Reception

Aggregate score
Aggregator	Score
Metacritic	52/100

Review scores
Publication	Score
Electronic Gaming Monthly	2.67/10
Game Informer	5/10
GameRevolution	D
GameSpy	67%
GameZone	6.1/10
IGN	6/10
Official U.S. PlayStation Magazine	1.5/5

The game received "mixed" reviews according to the review aggregation website Metacritic.
