= NCAA Gamebreaker 98 =

1997 video game

- Cover art featuring Warrick Dunn
- Developer: Sony Interactive Studios America
- Publisher: Sony Computer Entertainment
- Series: NCAA GameBreaker
- Platform: PlayStation
- Release: NA: November 21, 1997
- Genre: Sports video game
- Modes: Single-player, multiplayer

NCAA Gamebreaker 98 is a 1997 American football video game developed by Sony Interactive Studios America and published by Sony Computer Entertainment for the PlayStation. It is the sequel to NCAA Gamebreaker and was released only in North America.

== Gameplay ==
NCAA Gamebreaker 98 has a game engine that is based on the NFL GameDay 98 engine, but uses the appearance and playing styles involved in college football. The game includes the Division I-A teams with their real rosters for the 1997/98 season, along with some historical teams such as the 1972 USC Gamecocks. It was the first game in the series to include a playbook editor, enabling players to modify the pass routes and running assignments in existing plays.

== Reception ==
Reception

Review scores
Publication	Score
Electronic Gaming Monthly	8/10
Game Informer	9/10
GameFan	86% (Note: In GameFan's viewpoint of the game, one critic gave it 87, and another 84.)
IGN	8/10
Next Generation	5/5

Reviews for NCAA Gamebreaker 98 were uniformly positive. Next Generation said that the game "borrows heavily from GameDay, but amazingly, the end result is a football game that has no equal." Kraig Kujawa of Electronic Gaming Monthly similarly commented, "At first look, GameBreaker 98 appears to be GameDay 98 with college colors. And for the most part, it is. But after further review, the game shines because of its own merits." GamePro concluded that "GameBreaker's superior graphics, fast gameplay, and play-creation option make it one of the better football titles of the year." (Note: GamePro gave the game a 5.0/5 for graphics, 4.0/5 for sound, and 4.5/5 scores for control and fun factor.)

Critics unanimously praised the game's play editor, but were divided as to what the game's strongest feature is. IGN centered praise on the play editor and Total Control Passing mechanic, but Next Generation argued that the game's greatest improvement over NFL GameDay 98 is the ability to intercept passes, since this "completely change[s] strategies, defenses, and offenses." Kujawa found the play editor the most impressive feature. At the same time, his co-reviewer Crispin Boyer dismissed it as "a nice touch, but one only hardcore fans will use", and was more enthusiastic about the "quick-and-dirty" arcade-style feel of the "hyperactive tackles and crazy plays." All four of the Electronic Gaming Monthly reviewers also criticized that the play diagrams used with the play editor are extremely difficult to read. A number of critics expressed approval of the game's A.I.
