= NBA (2005 video game) =

2005 basketball video game

- North American cover art featuring Ray Allen
- Developer: San Diego Studio
- Publisher: Sony Computer Entertainment
- Platform: PlayStation Portable
- Release: NA: March 24, 2005
- Genre: Sports
- Modes: Single-player, multiplayer

NBA, also referred to as NBA 2005, is a 2005 basketball video game developed by San Diego Studio and published by Sony Computer Entertainment for the PlayStation Portable. It was the first licensed basketball game to be released for the system and the final NBA game to be released under the 989 Sports brand.

== Gameplay ==
NBA has four main modes: Quick Play, Online, Game Modes, and Mini-Games, with the four basic Game Modes being practice, exhibition, season, and playoffs.

== Reception ==
Reception

Aggregate score
Aggregator	Score
Metacritic	57/100

Review scores
Publication	Score
1Up.com	C+
Game Informer	6.25/10
GamePro	3.5/5
GameRevolution	D
GameSpot	5.5/10
GameSpy	1.5/5
GameZone	6.9/10
IGN	6/10
Official U.S. PlayStation Magazine	2.5/5
PlayStation: The Official Magazine	5.5/10

The game received "mixed" reviews according to the review aggregation website Metacritic.
