= Guns Up! =

2015 free-to-play action video game

- Developers: San Diego Studio; Valkyrie Entertainment; NHN Bigfoot (mobile)
- Publishers: Sony Computer Entertainment; NHN Entertainment (mobile)
- Platforms: PlayStation 4 Windows; Android iOS
- Release: PlayStation 4; December 5, 2015; Windows; February 5, 2018; Android, iOS; April 1, 2022
- Genres: Action, strategy
- Mode: Multiplayer

Guns Up! (stylized as GUNS UP!) was a free-to-play action strategy game developed by San Diego Studio and Valkyrie Entertainment and published by Sony Computer Entertainment for the PlayStation 4. It was originally released on December 5, 2015. A Windows port was later released on February 5, 2018, through Steam. A mobile port licensed by Sony for iOS and Android developed and published by NHN Bigfoot with Valkyrie's involvement was released on April 1, 2022.

It received mixed reception from critics, who commended its accessibility but criticized its lack of complexity and microtransactions.

Online services for the game was planned to be terminated on April 14, 2023, rendering the game unplayable; however, due to overwhelming support from the gaming community, the shutdown was postponed until December 14, 2023. The mobile port was not affected.

== Gameplay ==
The game tasks players with creating an impenetrable base and an army to attack the bases of other players. The player must use munitions, the in-game currency, to do this, which is earned by attacking other players' bases. The multiplayer is asynchronous in that players cannot defend their bases, only direct their troops in capturing other bases. The player can randomly unlock special attacks on the field and from support cards.

There is the option to spend real currency to buy in-game gold, which can unlock special soldiers much faster, as well as customize the player's army and soldiers. In battle, the player loses if their transport truck is destroyed.

== Reception ==
Reception

Aggregate score
Aggregator	Score
Metacritic	PS4: 54/100

The game received mixed reception, with the aggregate score being 54/100 on Metacritic based on 13 reviews. C.J. Andriessen of Destructoid rated the game 25/100, calling the game "repetitive, tedious" and "digital Ambien", and stated that the game was "un-fun" without spending money on microtransactions to increase the XP gained, but also said that the microtransactions made the game too easy. Dean Takahashi of GamesBeat rated the game 70/100, finding it "fun and replayable", but criticizing the "slow network response". He compared it to Clash of Clans and said that it had the potential to bridge the gap between mobile and console games if the network was more reliable. Ben Tarrant of Playstation Lifestyle gave the game a score of 75 out of 100 stating "Guns Up! is devilishly addictive" and, "leaving you with a constant desire to progress and improve both your settlement and your garrison of units". Official PlayStation Magazine UK rated the game 40/100, saying that it felt "soulless" and that it was "a mobile freemium game in poor disguise".

IGN nominated Guns Up! for "Best Strategy Game" at E3 2014
