= NCAA Final Four 99 =

1999 video game

- Cover art featuring Paul Pierce
- Developer(s): Killer Game
- Publisher(s): 989 Sports
- Platform(s): PlayStation
- Release: NA: January 13, 1999
- Genre(s): Sports (Basketball)
- Mode(s): Single-player, Multiplayer

NCAA Final Four 99 is a 1999 basketball video game developed by Killer Game and published by 989 Sports for the PlayStation in 1999. It was the first of several college basketball games published by 989 Sports.

== Gameplay ==
NCAA Final Four 99 has four game play modes: Quick Start, Exhibition, New Season, and New Tournament. The game includes all the 250 Division 1 NCAA teams There are teams and players in 32 different categories. The game includes teams, polls, standings, and award stats, as well as an injury report. The options allow players to modify game standards, injuries, fatigue, auto replays, game speed, difficulty level, and the choice of replay color. The player can take control of all five players on the team. NCAA FINAL FOUR 99 offers three gameplay modes: Exhibition, Tournament, and a 30-game Season.

== Reception ==
IGN gave the game a score of 7.9 out of 10. The Philadelphia Inquirer said "Despite those technical fouls, Final Four 99 is an engaging play that will keep you entertained throughout the tournament".
