= NCAA GameBreaker 2004 =

2003 video game

- Cover featuring Larry Johnson
- Developers: Red Zone Interactive; 989 Sports
- Publisher: Sony Computer Entertainment
- Series: NCAA GameBreaker
- Platform: PlayStation 2
- Release: NA: August 26, 2003
- Genre: Sports
- Modes: Single-player, multiplayer

NCAA GameBreaker 2004 is a 2003 American football video game developed by Red Zone Interactive and 989 Sports and published by Sony Computer Entertainment for PlayStation 2. It is the last game in the NCAA GameBreaker series.

== Reception ==
Reception

Aggregate score
Aggregator	Score
Metacritic	61/100

Review scores
Publication	Score
GameSpot	5.7/10
GameSpy	2/5
GameZone	7.7/10
Official U.S. PlayStation Magazine	2.5/5
PlayStation: The Official Magazine	6/10
X-Play	2/5

The game received "mixed" reviews, albeit less so than NCAA GameBreaker 2003, according to the review aggregation website Metacritic.
