= NCAA Final Four 2000 =

1999 video game

- Cover featuring Trajan Langdon
- Developer: Killer Game
- Publisher: 989 Sports
- Platform: PlayStation
- Release: NA: November 17, 1999
- Genre: Sports
- Modes: Single-player, multiplayer

NCAA Final Four 2000 is a 1999 basketball video game developed by Killer Game and published by 989 Sports for the PlayStation. It was released only in North America.

== Reception ==
Reception

Aggregate score
Aggregator	Score
GameRankings	75%

Review scores
Publication	Score
AllGame	4/5
Electronic Gaming Monthly	6.875/10
Game Informer	7/10
GamePro	3.5/5
GameRevolution	C−
GameSpot	7.8/10
IGN	7.9/10
Official U.S. PlayStation Magazine	3.5/5
PlayStation: The Official Magazine	2/5

The game received "favorable" reviews according to the review aggregation website GameRankings.
