= NFL GameDay '97 =

1996 video game

- North American cover art
- Developer: Sony Interactive Studios America
- Publisher: Sony Computer Entertainment
- Series: NFL GameDay
- Platform: PlayStation
- Release: NA: December 4, 1996
- Genre: Sports
- Modes: Single-player, multiplayer

NFL GameDay '97 is a 1996 American football video game developed by Sony Interactive Studios America and published by Sony Computer Entertainment for the PlayStation. It is the second installment of the NFL GameDay series and was only released in North America. Daryl Johnston is featured on the cover.

== Gameplay ==
Gameday 97 includes new options & features like season-ending injuries, a full-fledged draft, more statistics, and the ability to create players. It features all 30 NFL teams (1,500 NFLPA players) and modeled stadiums, including real NFL uniforms with real logos and numbers.

== Development ==
Motion capture was again used, with Tim Brown being the motion capture actor. In order to avoid a common complaint against competitor Madden NFL - that the A.I. can consistently be beaten with a specific play - the developers hired a full-time game tester whose job was specifically to find such plays and report them so that a counter could be developed.

== Reception ==
Reception

Aggregate score
Aggregator	Score
GameRankings	86%

Review scores
Publication	Score
AllGame	4/5
Electronic Gaming Monthly	9.5/10
Game Informer	9.25/10
GameFan	91%
GameRevolution	A−
GameSpot	8/10
IGN	7.8/10
Next Generation	5/5
Ultra Game Players	9.3/10

The game was greeted with critical acclaim. Lauding the realistic variety of possibilities offered by the new moves, the advanced AI which cannot be repeatedly fooled by the same play, and the passing system, in particular the ability to control the receiver in mid-pass, critics agreed that NFL GameDay '97 had managed to exceed its already phenomenal predecessor and all the other football games on the market. GamePro gave it a 4.5 out 5 in graphics and sound and a perfect 5 in both control and fun factor, especially praising the depth and realism of the gameplay. GameSpot's Ryan MacDonald concluded it has "enough solid gameplay to make this the best football game around, on any system." An Ultra Game Players critic declared that "With GameDay '97, Sony has proved that last year wasn't a fluke by making the best grid-iron game to date." Next Generation, which had the same publisher as Ultra Game Players, mostly repeated the text from their review. Kraig Kujawa of Electronic Gaming Monthly (EGM) summarized, "Not only did they fix just about every flaw that marred the original without breaking anything, but they also added some innovative features ... Sharp graphics, brisk gameplay and a healthy dose of realism and fun make this title the best football game ever." His co-reviewer Dean Hager remarked, "Beginners as well as football simulation junkies will be satisfied with the game's ability to entertain and challenge players of all skill levels." The game held an 86% on the review aggregation website GameRankings based on five reviews. NFL GameDay '97 was a runner-up for EGM's Sports Game of the Year (behind Wave Race 64).

The game was another success for Sony, selling 350,000 copies in North America during the first week of its release alone.
