= NBA ShootOut 98 =

1998 video game

NBA ShootOut 98 Total NBA 98
- Developer: Sony Interactive Studios America
- Publisher: Sony Computer Entertainment
- Platform: PlayStation
- Release: NA: March 11, 1998; EU: May 15, 1998
- Genre: Sports (Basketball)
- Modes: Single-player, Multiplayer

NBA ShootOut 98, known in Europe as Total NBA 98, is a video game developed by Sony Interactive Studios America and published by Sony Computer Entertainment for the PlayStation in 1998. It is the third installment of the NBA ShootOut series. The cover features Hakeem Olajuwon of the Houston Rockets.

== Gameplay ==
ShootOut 98 features rosters from the 1997–98 NBA season. For the first time in the series, Shaquille O'Neal and Charles Barkley were both added to the game, although Michael Jordan did not appear in the game, and was still represented by a custom player named "Roster Guard" on the Chicago Bulls.

The game introduces a system called "icon cutting", which allows players to control cutters, screens, and double teams.

== Reception ==
Reception

Aggregate score
| Aggregator | Score |
|---|---|
| GameRankings | 70% |

Review scores
| Publication | Score |
|---|---|
| Electronic Gaming Monthly | 6.125/10 |
| Game Informer | 8.75/10 |
| GameFan | 86% |
| GameRevolution | C− |
| GameSpot | 4.7/10 |
| IGN | 8.8/10 |
| Official U.S. PlayStation Magazine | 3.5/5 |
| PlayStation: The Official Magazine | 2.5/5 |

NBA ShootOut 98 met with divisive reviews; while IGN and GamePro hailed it as the best basketball game on the market, Electronic Gaming Monthly (EGM), GameSpot, and Game Revolution all regarded it as a disappointing entry with gameplay so unbalanced that it fails to surpass its own predecessor, NBA ShootOut '97. The game held a 70% on the review aggregation website GameRankings based on five reviews.

Critics - even the game's detractors - almost uniformly praised NBA ShootOut 98's fluid and realistic graphics, "icon cutting" mechanic, and ability to select which dunk to perform in mid-air. Game Revolution, which otherwise panned the game, remarked that "The players look like the actual players, even more so than in Live ’98. The courts are beautiful, with killer reflections and glare effects. Even close-ups of the action look great. In short, this is the prettiest sports title ever made for the PSX."

However, reviews widely agreed that the game made it too easy for both human players and computer-controlled players to steal and block the ball. Kraig Kujawa of EGM said he saw more blown easy shots and blocked dunks and lay-ups than he had in any other video game, with his co-reviewer Sushi-X agreeing that it was "comical" how prevalent they are, and IGN said it creates an unbalanced game where whoever gets the most steals and fastbreaks wins. GamePro instead praised this aspect for "finally giving the defense a chance to stop their opponents from scoring on almost every play." They gave NBA ShootOut '98 a 4.0 out of 5 in sound and a perfect 5.0 in every other category (graphics, control, and fun factor). Both EGM and GameSpot said the gameplay balance was further compromised by the fact that players can make it past any defense just by repeatedly pressing the spin button.

Critics also widely decried the announcer as annoying. Game Revolution elaborated, "The only time he pipes up is to announce fouls or baskets. With brilliant quips such as, 'Number 8, KOOOOBBEEEEEEE BRAHIIIIIIIIAAAANNNNTTT!!! With the East Bay jam-a-lam.' Will someone please shoot this guy and find someone who actually calls the game? Or at least just shoot this guy?" Despite the general esteem for the graphics, some critics noted bouts of slowdown, especially when playing with more than two players. GameSpot remarked, "This actually affects gameplay since what was once an unconscious thought of running from point A to point B has to now be factored in with the varying speed of the game. But since it's fairly random and you have no warning or no idea how long it lasts, it's hard to deal with it."
