= Rally Cross 2 =

1998 video game

- Developer: Idol Minds
- Publishers: NA: 989 Studios; EU: Sony Computer Entertainment
- Composer: Guttermouth
- Platform: PlayStation
- Release: NA: November 1998; EU: March 5, 1999
- Genre: Racing
- Modes: Single-player, multiplayer

Rally Cross 2 is a 1998 racing video game developed by Idol Minds and published by Sony Computer Entertainment for the PlayStation. 989 Studios released the game in North America. It is the sequel to Rally Cross (1997).

== Game modes ==
- Single race: Choose any vehicle and track and race against three opponents, there are three sub-modes, Normal, which is self-explanatory, Head-on, which is where one opponent races in the opposite direction of the player and Suicide which is the same as Head-on but with three opponents.
- Season: Rally through an extensive season, unlocking vehicles and tracks.
- Time Trial: Try to get the best lap-time possible on a certain track.
- Practice: Practice your rallying skills.

Some vehicles' parts (shocks, steering, brakes, ratios, gearbox and tires) can be modified to the player's liking. All vehicles' bodies can be painted as well.

The game's sixteen tracks are also available in reverse, making a total of thirty-two tracks.

== Reception ==
Reception

Aggregate score
Aggregator	Score
GameRankings	77%

Review scores
Publication	Score
AllGame	4/5
Electronic Gaming Monthly	8.125/10
Game Informer	8.25/10
GameFan	93%
GamePro	4/5
GameRevolution	B
GameSpot	7.7/10
IGN	7.5/10
Next Generation	4/5
PlayStation Official Magazine – UK	6/10
Official U.S. PlayStation Magazine	3.5/5

The game received favorable reviews according to the review aggregation website GameRankings. Next Generation called it "a very solid second effort that sets the title well on its way to becoming an established brand – if [the developers] can keep improving the game this much every sequel." However, no further games in the series have been released so far.
