= NFL GameDay 2003 =

2002 video game

- PlayStation 2 cover art
- Developers: Red Zone Interactive; 989 Sports
- Publisher: Sony Computer Entertainment
- Series: NFL GameDay
- Platforms: PlayStation, PlayStation 2
- Release: NA: August 13, 2002
- Genre: Sports
- Modes: Single-player, multiplayer

NFL GameDay 2003 is a 2002 American football video game developed by Red Zone Interactive and 989 Sports and published by Sony Computer Entertainment for the PlayStation and the PlayStation 2. On the cover is Tom Brady.

== Reception ==
Reception

Aggregate score
| Aggregator | Score | |
| Aggregator | PS | PS2 |
|---|---|---|
| Metacritic | 61/100 | 60/100 |

Review scores
| Publication | Score | |
| Publication | PS | PS2 |
|---|---|---|
| Electronic Gaming Monthly | N/A | 3.5/10 |
| Game Informer | N/A | 7.5/10 |
| GamePro | N/A | 4/5 |
| GameRevolution | N/A | D |
| GameSpot | N/A | 6.9/10 |
| GameZone | 7.2/10 | 6/10 |
| IGN | N/A | 7/10 |
| Official U.S. PlayStation Magazine | 3/5 | 2.5/5 |
| PlayStation: The Official Magazine | N/A | 5/10 |
| X-Play | N/A | 3/5 |
| The Cincinnati Enquirer | N/A | 3.5/5 |
| Maxim | N/A | 2/5 |

The game received "mixed" reviews on both platforms according to the review aggregation website Metacritic.

The game sold nearly 400,000 units.
