= NFL GameDay 99 =

1998 video game

- Developer: Red Zone Interactive
- Publisher: 989 Sports
- Series: NFL GameDay
- Platforms: PlayStation, Windows
- Release: NA: August 25, 1998 (PS); NA: September 1998 (PC)
- Genre: Sports
- Modes: Single-player, multiplayer

NFL GameDay 99 is a football video game for the PlayStation and Microsoft Windows. It was first released in 1998 by 989 Sports. On the cover is Terrell Davis.

== Development ==
The game had a marketing budget of $10–12 million.

== Reception ==
Reception

Aggregate score
Aggregator	Score	
Aggregator	PC	PS
GameRankings	72%	87%

Review scores
Publication	Score	
Publication	PC	PS
AllGame	N/A	4/5
CNET Gamecenter	7/10	7/10
Computer Gaming World	3/5	N/A
Game Informer	N/A	7/10
GameFan	N/A	92%
GamePro	3/5	N/A
GameRevolution	N/A	B+
GameSpot	7.1/10	8.6/10
IGN	6/10	9.3/10
Next Generation	N/A	5/5
Official U.S. PlayStation Magazine	N/A	4/5
PC Accelerator	8/10	N/A
PC Gamer (US)	68%	N/A

The PlayStation version received "favorable" reviews, while the PC version received "average" reviews, according to the review aggregation website GameRankings. Next Generation said of the former console version, "There is really no room for criticism of NFL GameDay '99 – it provides everything a gamer could possibly want from a console football game."
