= NFL GameDay 2000 =

1999 video game

- Developer: Red Zone Interactive
- Publisher: 989 Sports
- Series: NFL GameDay
- Platform: PlayStation
- Release: NA: August 11, 1999
- Genre: Sports
- Modes: Single-player, multiplayer

NFL GameDay 2000 is a 1999 American football video game developed by Red Zone Interactive and 989 Sports and published by 989 Sports for the PlayStation. On the cover is Terrell Davis.

== Reception ==
Reception

Aggregate score
Aggregator	Score
GameRankings	79%

Review scores
Publication	Score
CNET Gamecenter	6/10
Electronic Gaming Monthly	7.625/10 (Note: Four critics of Electronic Gaming Monthly gave the game each a score of 7.5/10, 8.5/10, 6.5/10, and 8/10.)
EP Daily	8.5/10
Game Informer	8.25/10
GameFan	86% (Note: In GameFan's viewpoint of the game, one critic gave it 89, and the other 82.)
GameRevolution	B−
GameSpot	8.9/10
IGN	8.3/10
Next Generation	4/5
Official U.S. PlayStation Magazine	4/5

The game received "favorable" reviews according to the review aggregation website GameRankings. Frank O'Connor of NextGen said, "The top PlayStation football game gets deeper, but it ain't the best-looking football game in town anymore." The Rookie of GamePro said, "While Madden 2000, with its slightly deeper features set, stands atop the PlayStation pigskin world this season, NFL GameDay 2000 is still an excellent football title. It delivers a wealth of gameplay goods while still retaining the flava that made the previous GameDays big hits." (Note: GamePro gave the game 5/5 for graphics, and three 4.5/5 scores for sound, control, and fun factor.)
