= Tennis Arena =

1997 video game

- Developer: Smart Dog
- Publisher: Ubi Soft
- Platforms: PlayStation, Sega Saturn
- Release: EU: November 1997; NA: April 3, 1998
- Genre: Sports game
- Modes: Single-player, multiplayer

Tennis Arena is a video game developed by British studio Smart Dog and published by Ubi Soft for the PlayStation and Sega Saturn in 1997-1998. The Saturn version was released only in Japan.

== Reception ==
Reception

Aggregate score
Aggregator	Score
GameRankings	63%

Review scores
Publication	Score
CNET Gamecenter	7/10
Electronic Gaming Monthly	6.5/10 (Note: In Electronic Gaming Monthly's review of the PlayStation version, Kelly Rickards gave it a score of 5.5/10, John Ricciardi gave it 7.5/10, Crispin Boyer gave it 6.5/10, and Kraig Kujawa gave it 6.5/10.)
Famitsu	25/40; 22/40 (Saturn)
Game Informer	7.5/10
GameFan	76% (Note: In GameFan's viewpoint of the PlayStation version, one critic gave it a score of 71, and the other 80.)
GameSpot	5.6/10
IGN	5/10
Next Generation	2/5
PlayStation Official Magazine – UK	7/10
Official U.S. PlayStation Magazine	2.5/5

The PlayStation version held a 63% on the review aggregation website GameRankings, based on four reviews. CNET Gamecenter gave the game an above-average review.

Many magazines likened it to a 3D version of Pong due to the limited control the player has over where the ball goes. Critical responses to this limited control varied. Josh Smith of GameSpot reasoned that the arbitrary reactions to swinging at the ball and moving the player across the court result in an unfair game, and found the repetitive voice clips annoying, but he concluded, "Yet, with no obvious strong points, somehow the game manages to be pretty addictive, especially in two-player mode. ... It's simple really. At its core, it's an updated version of Pong, and Pong is fun." IGN's Jay Boor, while agreeing that Tennis Arena is fun, felt that the shallow and limited control left it with no credibility as a real tennis game. Next Generation criticized the absence of licensed real-world players, and similarly said that the limited control over the ball makes Tennis Arena "an arcade treatment of a sport that ought to be fun and exciting but winds up being mostly boring."

Among the four-reviewer team for Electronic Gaming Monthly, Kelly Rickards said the game is solid but that the arcade-style touches, such as the special shots and the star icons, feel silly and ruined the game for him; John Ricciardi praised it as being intuitive enough for both tennis fans and non-fans; Crispin Boyer said it was enjoyable but considerably compromised by the limited control; and Kraig Kujawa opined that the arcade style touches at once were amusing and undermined the realism of the game. GamePro praised the core gameplay and goofy arcade touches, but found the controls unnecessarily complicated and the A.I. incompetent, and argued that the game should have used real-world players and tournaments. The reviewer summed up, "The only PlayStation tennis game worth buying, Arena may still leave gamers wishing for more." (Note: GamePro gave the PlayStation version three 4/5 scores for graphics, control, and fun factor, and 2.5/5 for sound.) A quotation of GamePro referring to Tennis Arena as the best tennis game on PlayStation was pulled from the context of the review's overall middling assessment and put on the cover of the game's North American release. In 1998, Saturn Power ranked the game 98th on their Top 100 Sega Saturn Games summarizing: "The best tennis game on the Saturn, but Tennis Arena has little in the way of competition. It's not a great looking game (or particularly well designed) but it's fun enough with two."
