= League of Pain =

1997 video game

- North American PlayStation box art
- Developer: Beyond Reality
- Publisher: Psygnosis
- Designers: Lee Doyle; Graham McCormick; Craig Lawson; Dale Thomson
- Programmers: Andrew Bond; Graeme Love; Tim Swan
- Composer: David Lowe
- Platforms: PlayStation, MS-DOS, Windows
- Release: PlayStation: NA: 13 February 1997; EU: 1 April 1997; MS-DOS, Windows: EU: 1997
- Genre: Sports
- Modes: Single-player, multiplayer

League of Pain, also known as Professional Underground League of Pain, and known as Riot in the UK, is a 1997 sports video game developed by British studio Beyond Reality and published by Psygnosis for the PlayStation, MS-DOS, and Windows.

== Plot ==
National sports games are under threat by a new sport, Riot. Sponsors are pulling the plug on funding of traditional sports and moving to this new hybrid sport.

== Gameplay ==
League of Pain combines elements of rugby, soccer/football and basketball in a futuristic sport that is violent and without rules. The objective of the game is to charge up the plasma ball, and to then launch it through the ring that floats above the centre of the play area. The points earned from a goal are determined by the distance from the ring. The ball is charged by reaching the charger in the opponents side of the arena. In the PlayStation version, once charged, the ball will glow purple to indicate the home team charged it, or yellow to indicate the away team charged it. For the Windows/DOS version, the ball will glow blue to indicate a home team charge and green to indicate an away team charge. If the player scores while the ball is charged with the opposing team's color, it will count as an own goal. Despite the futuristic set-up, the game plays in much the same way as standard sports games with the ability to tackle, slide and shoot but also allows the player to fight with their opponents.

There are 5 types of power-up available that are randomly thrown into the arena by the crowd. The power-ups are "Speed Up" which makes the player move 3 times faster than usual, "Power Punch" which makes the player's punching power 3 times stronger, "Power Shot" which makes the player throw the ball faster and harder, enabling the ball to be used as a weapon against opponents, "Health" which restores the player's health to maximum and "Hawkeye" which increases the accuracy of passes and shooting.

== Teams ==
There are 16 international teams to choose from and an option that allows for customisation and trading of players.

- New York Knights (USA)
- Los Angeles Lasers (USA)
- Tijuana Tyrants (Mexico)
- Mexico City Aces (Mexico)
- London Royals (England)
- Liverpool Dockers (England)
- Paris Strikers (France)
- Lyon Sharks (France)
- Frankfurt Vipers (Germany)
- Berlin Breakers (Germany)
- Leningrade Reds (Russia)
- Moscow Maulers (Russia)
- Osaka Comets (Japan)
- Tokyo Tornados (Japan)
- Sydney Sentinels (Australia)
- Melbourne Destroyers (Australia)

=== Game modes ===
Friendly: A single exhibition game. This mode allows for team selections and team editing.

League: A season of 30 games where you play each of the teams twice.

Exhibition: A knockout competition with 2, 3 or 4 rounds.

Network: Only available on the Windows/DOS version. Allows for network play between 8 players but only allows for a "Friendly" game to be played.

=== Additional features ===
There are also in-game options to perform substitutions to alter the player line-up, and the ability to view a replay of the in-game action.

== Reception ==
Reception

Aggregate score
Aggregator	Score
GameRankings	65%

Review scores
Publication	Score
AllGame	3/5
CNET Gamecenter	4/10
Electronic Gaming Monthly	6/10
EP Daily	8.5/10
Game Informer	5.75/10
GamePro	3.5/5 (Note: GamePro gave the PlayStation version three 3.5/5 scores for graphics, sound, and overall fun factor, and 3/5 for control.)
GameRevolution	C−
GameSpot	4.5/10
Next Generation	3/5
PC Zone	(PC; 1998) 72% (PC; 1997) 50%

The PlayStation version received mixed reviews. Next Generation said that the game "offers an interesting alternative to the standard 'real' sports games. And you have to love a game with violence and no rules." GamePro said, "League of Pain is fun at times, especially with 2 players, but the camera angles and sometimes frustrating control doom it to rental status."
