= NCAA GameBreaker 2000 =

1999 video game

- Cover art featuring Cade McNown
- Developer: Red Zone Entertainment
- Publisher: 989 Sports
- Series: NCAA GameBreaker
- Platform: PlayStation
- Release: NA: August 11, 1999
- Genre: Sports
- Modes: Single-player, multiplayer

NCAA GameBreaker 2000 is a 1999 American football video game developed by Red Zone Entertainment and published by 989 Sports for the PlayStation. The game featured former UCLA Bruins quarterback Cade McNown on the cover.

== Reception ==
Reception

Aggregate score
Aggregator	Score
GameRankings	77%

Review scores
Publication	Score
AllGame	4/5
Electronic Gaming Monthly	7.33/10
Game Informer	7.5/10
GameFan	87%
GameRevolution	C
GameSpot	8.2/10
IGN	8/10
Official U.S. PlayStation Magazine	3/5

The game received "favorable" reviews according to the review aggregation website GameRankings.
