= High Velocity Bowling =

2007 video game

- PlayStation Store icon
- Developer: San Diego Studio
- Publisher: Sony Computer Entertainment
- Platform: PlayStation Network
- Release: NA: December 6, 2007; PAL: May 6, 2008; Move Edition: NA: September 21, 2010
- Genre: Sports
- Modes: Single-player, multiplayer

High Velocity Bowling is a bowling video game developed by San Diego Studio and published by Sony Computer Entertainment for the PlayStation 3. It was released on the PlayStation Network.

== Gameplay ==
High Velocity Bowling varies from other bowling games by introducing a challenge mode. The player has to go through every level to unlock all of the 10 playable characters and all of the 10 lanes. Each level has three challenges to complete. These challenges can be tournaments, matches or trick shots, where the objective is to get a strike while following a certain road. The game also has a trophy room, in which the player can see his trophies, rings and patches he gained through the game. While the player can use the Sixaxis for the bowling swing, there are other control schemes in the game. Finally, High Velocity Bowling has a multiplayer mode, where up to four people can play online and offline. At Tokyo Game Show 2009 it was confirmed that High Velocity Bowling would get an update that would add support for PlayStation Move.

== Release ==
The game was first announced at the SCEA's Gamers Day 2007 at their Santa Monica Studios. The European release date was originally scheduled for an April 2008 release, but this was then delayed until May because of the new and improved PlayStation Store, included in Firmware 2.3. The game was released in the PAL region on May 6, 2008. On September 21, 2010, an update made the game playable with the PlayStation Move controller.

== Reception ==
Reception

Aggregate score
Aggregator	Score
Metacritic	66/100

Review scores
Publication	Score
1Up.com	C+
Eurogamer	6/10
Famitsu	25/40
GamesMaster	54%
GameZone	6.8/10
IGN	7.5/10
PlayStation Official Magazine – UK	(Move) 7/10; 6/10
PlayStation: The Official Magazine	7/10
PSM3	72%
Push Square	7/10
VideoGamer.com	5/10

The game received "average" reviews according to the review aggregation website Metacritic. In Japan, where the Move edition was ported for release as Free! Free! Bowling on December 9, 2010, Famitsu gave it a score of one six, two sevens, and one five for a total of 25 out of 40.
