= NFL GameDay 2004 =

2003 video game

- PlayStation cover art
- Developer: San Diego Studio (Note: Developed under the Red Zone Interactive and 989 Sports names)
- Publisher: Sony Computer Entertainment America (Note: Published under the 989 Sports label)
- Series: NFL GameDay
- Platforms: PlayStation, PlayStation 2
- Release: NA: August 26, 2003
- Genre: Sports
- Modes: Single-player, multiplayer

NFL GameDay 2004 is a 2003 American football video game developed by San Diego Studio under the Red Zone Interactive and 989 Sports names and published by Sony Computer Entertainment for the PlayStation and the PlayStation 2. On the cover is LaDainian Tomlinson.

== Development ==
The game had a marketing budget of $6.4 million.

== Reception ==
Reception

Aggregate score
| Aggregator | Score | |
| Aggregator | PS | PS2 |
|---|---|---|
| Metacritic | 53/100 | 65/100 |

Review scores
| Publication | Score | |
| Publication | PS | PS2 |
|---|---|---|
| Electronic Gaming Monthly | N/A | 4.67/10 |
| Game Informer | N/A | 7/10 |
| GamePro | N/A | 4/5 |
| GameRevolution | N/A | C |
| GameSpot | N/A | 6.3/10 |
| GameSpy | N/A | 4/5 |
| GameZone | 6.5/10 | 8.2/10 |
| IGN | N/A | 8/10 |
| Official U.S. PlayStation Magazine | 2/5 | 3/5 |
| X-Play | N/A | 2/5 |
| The Cincinnati Enquirer | N/A | 3.5/5 |

The game received "mixed" reviews on both platforms according to the review aggregation website Metacritic.

The game sold 410,000 units.
