= NHL FaceOff (video game) =

1995 video game

- North American cover art
- Developer(s): Sony Interactive Studios America
- Publisher(s): Sony Computer Entertainment
- Producer(s): John Smedley; Robert Baumsteiger
- Programmer(s): Craig Broadbooks; Joe Wilkerson; Paul Willman
- Artist(s): Andrew Dennis; Andrew Jaros; Kevin Toft
- Writer(s): T. S. Flanagan
- Composer(s): Rex Baca
- Platform(s): PlayStation
- Release: NA: December 19, 1995; EU: 1996
- Genre(s): Sports
- Mode(s): Single-player, multiplayer

NHL FaceOff is an ice hockey video game developed by Sony Interactive Studios America and published by Sony Computer Entertainment for the PlayStation. It is the first game in the NHL FaceOff series.

== Gameplay ==
NHL FaceOff is a hockey game that features a 3D arena.

== Reception ==
Next Generation reviewed the PlayStation version of the game, rating it five stars out of five, and stated that "Overall, NHL Face Off is exactly the kind of 32-bit hockey experience you'd expect and want."

The game sold in excess of 200,000 units.

== Reviews ==
- GameFan (Jan, 1996)
- GamePro (Mar, 1996)
- Electronic Gaming Monthly (Feb, 1996)
- Video Games & Computer Entertainment - Feb, 1996
- IGN - Nov 25, 1996
- Game Revolution - Jun 04, 2004
- All Game Guide - 1998
