= NCAA Final Four 2001 =

2000 video game

- Cover featuring Mateen Cleaves
- Developer: Killer Game
- Publisher: Sony Computer Entertainment America
- Platforms: PlayStation, PlayStation 2
- Release: PlayStation: NA: November 16, 2000; PlayStation 2: NA: December 19, 2000
- Genre: Sports
- Modes: Single-player, multiplayer

NCAA Final Four 2001 is a 2000 basketball video game developed by Killer Game and published by Sony Computer Entertainment for the PlayStation and PlayStation 2. It is the first installment of the series to not be published by 989 Sports, it becoming a publishing label of Sony.

== Reception ==
Reception

Aggregate score
Aggregator	Score	
Aggregator	PS	PS2
Metacritic	55/100	49/100

Review scores
Publication	Score	
Publication	PS	PS2
AllGame	N/A	2/5
CNET Gamecenter	4/10	4/10
Electronic Gaming Monthly	5.33/10 (Note: In Electronic Gaming Monthly's review of the PlayStation version, one critic gave it 4/10, and the rest gave it each a score of 6/10.)	4/10 (Note: In Electronic Gaming Monthly's review of the PlayStation 2 version, one critic gave it 2/10, and the rest gave it each a score of 5/10.)
Game Informer	5.5/10	3/10
GameSpot	5.6/10	4.3/10
IGN	4.8/10	5/10
Next Generation	N/A	2/5
Official U.S. PlayStation Magazine	2/5	1/5
PlayStation: The Official Magazine	N/A	5/10

The PlayStation version received "mixed" reviews, while the PlayStation 2 version received "generally unfavorable reviews", according to the review aggregation website Metacritic. Rob Smolka of NextGen said of the latter console version, "Oh well, there's always next year (or the year after that, or the year after that...)." Tokyo Drifter of GamePro said that the same console version was "far from being a completely horrible game of hoops, but for $10 less, you can do much better with NCAA March Madness 2001 for the original PlayStation." (Note: GamePro gave the PlayStation 2 version 2/5 for graphics, and three 2.5/5 scores for sound, control, and fun factor.)
