= Steel Reign =

1997 video game

- Developers: Chantemar Creations; Sony Interactive Studios America
- Publisher: Sony Computer Entertainment
- Platform: PlayStation
- Release: NA: October 9, 1997; EU: February 1998
- Genre: Vehicular combat
- Modes: Single-player, multiplayer

Steel Reign is a vehicular combat video game developed by Chantemar Creations and Sony Interactive Studios America and published by Sony Computer Entertainment for the PlayStation. It was the only game to be developed by Chantemad Creations, which was absorbed by Verant Interactive, now Daybreak Game Company.

== Reception ==
Reception

Review scores
Publication	Score
AllGame	2.5/5
CNET Gamecenter	2/10
Electronic Gaming Monthly	4.875/10
Game Informer	7.75/10
GameFan	58% (Note: Three critics of GameFan gave the game each a score of 65, 66, and 43 in an early review.)
GameRevolution	D+
GameSpot	7/10
IGN	7/10
Next Generation	2/5
Official U.S. PlayStation Magazine	3/5

Steel Reign received mixed to negative reviews. Electronic Gaming Monthly's Steve Harris liked the game, opining that it offers a good balance of realism and arcade fun which is enhanced by the selection of vehicles and weapons, but his three co-reviewers all said that it looks and plays like a generic first generation PlayStation game, with mostly non-interactive environments, rough and pixelation textures, and lack of color. One of them, Ken "Sushi-X" Williams, also argued that the selection of vehicles is meaningless since one tank is obviously superior to the others, and even with the weakest tank the game is boringly easy. Like EGM, Next Generation found the game's simplistic action dull and comparable to first generation PlayStation games, concluding that "Had Steel Reign been released at the same time as Warhawk, it may have seemed more impressive. As it is, it's just another action title with lots of guns and explosions." Glenn Rubenstein, writing for GameSpot, instead contended that the game has a frustrating level of challenge, and praised its full motion video sequences, selection of weapons, multiplayer mode, and soundtrack, assessing that "it definitely ranks in the top 10 percent of what is currently out there." GamePro found the maze-like level designs in Steel Reign irritatingly restrictive, and while agreeing that the multiplayer mode is fun, felt that it was soured by the fact that matches are so short, they are nearly outlasted by their load times. They summarized that "Every time a bright side to this game pops up, it's pummeled by four problems. This one's a rental at best." (Note: GamePro gave the game 4/5 for graphics, 3.5/5 for sound, 4.5/5 for control, and 2.5/5 for fun factor.) IGN gave the game an above-average review, a few weeks before its U.S. release date.

The Electric Playground's Tommy Tallarico gave the game a 6/10, while co-host Victor Lucas gave it a 4/10.
