= Texas Lone Star Strikers =

- Founded: 2011
- League: Independent - 2014-2015, IBL 2013–2014
- Team history: Texas LoneStar Strikers; 2011–present
- Based in: Magnolia, Texas
- Arena: Arena (Montgomery County)
- Colors: Red, blue, gold and white
- Owner: MetroPlex Entertainment & Sports LLC
- Head coach: Cameron Robinson
- Championships: 0
- Dancers: Striker Dancers
- Website: www.lonestarstrikers.com

The Texas LoneStar Strikers are an American professional men's basketball team based in the Magnolia, Woodlands, and Conroe, Texas area.

They are currently Independent, but once were members of the International Basketball League and began play in the league in 2013. The team is owned by businessman and former collegiate athlete Glenn Shepherd. The team colors are red, blue, gold and white.
