= This Is Football 2003 =

2002 video game

- UK cover art featuring Kieron Dyer
- Developer: London Studio
- Publishers: EU: Sony Computer Entertainment; NA: 989 Sports
- Series: This Is Football
- Platform: PlayStation 2
- Release: EU: 4 October 2002; NA: 10 February 2003
- Genre: Sports
- Modes: Single-player, multiplayer

This Is Football 2003, known as World Tour Soccer 2003 in North America, is a sports video game developed by London Studio and published by Sony Computer Entertainment for the PlayStation 2. 989 Sports released the game in North America.

== Reception ==
Reception

Aggregate score
Aggregator	Score
Metacritic	78/100

Review scores
Publication	Score
Eurogamer	7/10
GameSpot	7.2/10

This Is Football 2003 received "generally positive" reviews, according to review aggregator Metacritic.
