= NBA ShootOut 2003 =

2002 video game

- Developers: Killer Game (PS); 989 Sports (PS2)
- Publisher: Sony Computer Entertainment America
- Platforms: PlayStation, PlayStation 2
- Release: NA: September 24, 2002
- Genre: Sports
- Modes: Single-player, Multiplayer

NBA ShootOut 2003 is a 2002 basketball video game developed by Killer Game and 989 Sports and published by Sony Computer Entertainment for the PlayStation and PlayStation 2. Ray Allen is featured on the cover,

== Reception ==
Reception

Aggregate score
Aggregator	Score	
Aggregator	PS	PS2
Metacritic	69/100	62/100

Review scores
Publication	Score	
Publication	PS	PS2
Electronic Gaming Monthly	N/A	5/10
Game Informer	N/A	6.75/10
GamePro	N/A	3/5
GameRevolution	N/A	D+
GameSpot	N/A	5.3/10
GameSpy	N/A	3/5
GameZone	6.5/10	6.8/10
IGN	N/A	7.3/10
Official U.S. PlayStation Magazine	3.5/5	3.5/5
X-Play	N/A	4/5

The game received "mixed or average reviews" on both platforms according to the review aggregation website Metacritic.
