= NBA ShootOut 2004 =

2003 basketball video game

- PlayStation 2 cover art with Tracy McGrady
- Developers: Killer Game (PS); San Diego Studio (Note: Developed under the 989 Sports name) (PS2)
- Publisher: Sony Computer Entertainment America (Note: Published under the 989 Sports label)
- Platforms: PlayStation, PlayStation 2
- Release: PlayStation: NA: October 6, 2003; PlayStation 2: NA: October 29, 2003
- Genre: Sports (Basketball)
- Modes: Single-player, Multiplayer

NBA ShootOut 2004 is a 2003 basketball video game developed by Killer Game and San Diego Studio under the 989 Sports name and published by Sony Computer Entertainment for the PlayStation and PlayStation 2. It is the final installment in the NBA ShootOut franchise. Tracy McGrady of the Orlando Magic is the cover athlete.

== Reception ==
Reception

Aggregate scores
Aggregator	Score	
Aggregator	PS	PS2
GameRankings	46%	65%
Metacritic	N/A	58/100

Review scores
Publication	Score	
Publication	PS	PS2
Game Informer	N/A	8/10
GameRevolution	N/A	C−
GameSpot	N/A	4.3/10
GameSpy	N/A	2/5
GameZone	6.9/10	7.2/10
IGN	N/A	6.9/10
Official U.S. PlayStation Magazine	1/5	3/5
PlayStation: The Official Magazine	N/A	6/10
X-Play	N/A	2/5

The PlayStation 2 version received "mixed" reviews according to the review aggregation website Metacritic.
