= NCAA GameBreaker 2003 =

2002 video game

- Cover art featuring Clinton Portis
- Developer: San Diego Studio (Note: Developed under the Red Zone Interactive and 989 Sports names)
- Publisher: Sony Computer Entertainment (Note: Published under the 989 Sports label)
- Series: NCAA GameBreaker
- Platform: PlayStation 2
- Release: NA: August 13, 2002
- Genre: Sports
- Modes: Single-player, multiplayer

NCAA GameBreaker 2003 is a 2002 American football video game developed by San Diego Studio under the Red Zone Interactive and 989 Sports names and published by Sony Computer Entertainment for the PlayStation 2.

== Reception ==
Reception

Aggregate score
Aggregator	Score
Metacritic	53/100

Review scores
Publication	Score
Electronic Gaming Monthly	3/10
GameRevolution	D+
GameSpot	5.3/10
GameZone	8.1/10
IGN	5.5/10
Official U.S. PlayStation Magazine	2/5
PlayStation: The Official Magazine	6/10

The game received "mixed" reviews according to the review aggregation website Metacritic. Dr. Zombie of GamePro said of the game, "It doesn't deserve starter status because its competition has a bigger head start with their titles, but it's definitely a big step in the right direction to contend for console dominance next year and beyond." (Note: GamePro gave the game 4/5 for graphics, sound, control, and fun factor.)
