= NFL Xtreme 2 =

1999 video game

- Developer: 989 Sports
- Publisher: 989 Sports
- Series: NFL Xtreme
- Platform: PlayStation
- Release: NA: July 20, 1999
- Genre: Sports
- Modes: Single-player, multiplayer

NFL Xtreme 2 is a 1999 American football video game developed and published by 989 Studios for the PlayStation. The cover athlete is Pro Football Hall of Fame defensive tackle John Randle.

== Reception ==
Reception

Aggregate score
Aggregator	Score
GameRankings	60%

Review scores
Publication	Score
AllGame	2.5/5
CNET Gamecenter	7/10
Electronic Gaming Monthly	3.25/10 (Note: Four critics of Electronic Gaming Monthly gave the game each a score of 4/10, 2.5/10, 3/10, and 3.5/10.)
Game Informer	8.25/10
GameFan	78% (Note: In GameFan's viewpoint of the game, one critic gave it 82, and the other 73.)
GameRevolution	B−
GameSpot	3.9/10
IGN	6.3/10
Next Generation	1/5
Official U.S. PlayStation Magazine	1.5/5

The game received mixed reviews, albeit a bit more well-received than the first NFL Xtreme, according to the review aggregation website GameRankings. John Lee of NextGen said, "Football purists will not be amused. Blitz fans will not be amused. In fact, unless you're looking for a simple diversion and [you] don't mind an erratic playbook, neither will you." The Rookie of GamePro, however, called it "a topnotch [sic] arcade-style football game with enough features, trash-talk, and insane action to get your blood pumping." (Note: GamePro gave the game two 4.5/5 scores for graphics and fun factor, 3.5/5 for sound, and 4/5 for control.)
