= NBA ShootOut 2000 =

1999 video game

- Developer: 989 Sports
- Publisher: 989 Sports
- Series: NBA ShootOut
- Platform: PlayStation
- Release: NA: December 21, 1999
- Genre: Sports
- Modes: Single-player, multiplayer

NBA ShootOut 2000 is a 1999 basketball video game developed and published by 989 Sports for the PlayStation. It is the fourth installment of the NBA ShootOut series and the first to not be published directly by Sony Computer Entertainment. The cover features Jason Kidd of the Phoenix Suns.

== Gameplay ==
ShootOut 2000 features rosters from the 1999–2000 NBA season.

== Reception ==
Reception

Aggregate score
Aggregator	Score
GameRankings	70%

Review scores
Publication	Score
AllGame	3/5
Electronic Gaming Monthly	6/10
Game Informer	4.75/10
GameFan	85%
GamePro	3.5/5
GameSpot	8.1/10
IGN	8.3/10
Official U.S. PlayStation Magazine	3/5

The game received "average" reviews according to the review aggregation website GameRankings.
