= NFL GameDay 98 =

1997 video game

- Developer: Sony Interactive Studios America
- Publisher: Sony Computer Entertainment America
- Producers: Chris Whaley; Andre Leighton
- Programmers: Kelly Walker; Chris Foley; Mike McMahon; David Simpson; Bill Long
- Composers: Rex Baca; Scott McMahon
- Series: NFL GameDay
- Platform: PlayStation
- Release: NA: September 1997
- Genre: Sports
- Modes: Single-player, multiplayer

NFL GameDay 98 is a 1997 American football video game developed by Sony Interactive Studios America and published by Sony Computer Entertainment for the PlayStation. It is the third installment of the NFL GameDay series and was only released in North America. Jerome Bettis is featured on the cover. It was the first football video game to feature 3D polygonal graphics (it took longer for football games to adopt fully polygonal graphics than other genres because their large number of players and requisite fast pace made it difficult to do so at a reasonable frame rate).

== Gameplay ==
NFL GameDay 98 is an American football game featuring polygonal players and a 3D game engine.

== Development ==
Jerome Bettis and Tim Brown served as the motion capture actors for the game.

== Marketing ==
Sony Computer Entertainment heavily marketed the game in printed and on television, with a campaign which characterized it as the choice of real NFL players. SCE held two pre-Super Bowl XXXII events with the game, one pitting Super Bowl participants Robert Brooks and Terrell Davis against each other, and one at the PlayStation NFL players party in which sixteen NFL players participated.

== Reception ==
Reception

Review scores
Publication	Score
AllGame	4.5/5
CNET Gamecenter	9/10
Electronic Gaming Monthly	9.25/10
Game Informer	8.75/10
GameFan	96% (Note: In GameFan's viewpoint of the game, one critic gave it a score of 96, and the other 95.)
GameRevolution	B
GameSpot	7.8/10
IGN	8.8/10
Next Generation	5/5
Official U.S. PlayStation Magazine	5/5

Like its two predecessors, NFL GameDay 98 was met with critical acclaim. Reviewers universally applauded its pioneering use of polygonal players in a football game, and in particular, the fact that it manages to do so without noticeable slowdown. GameSpot, for example, remarked that "After two years of sprite-based 32-bit football games, many believed it wasn't possible to create a fully 3D PlayStation football game without making tremendous sacrifices in gameplay or aesthetics. NFL GameDay '98 is proof that the PlayStation is capable of accomplishing such feats." Next Generation stated that "While Madden is still trying to get old school done right in the 32-bit age, Sony has, for the third year in a row, successfully reinvented the wheel and made it spin." Some critics also noted that the use of polygons for the players enabled new moves that would not be possible with sprites.

Reviews also widely praised the game's accessibility, player animations, and sound effects. However, some still concluded that it fell second to its chief competitor, Madden NFL 98. GameSpot found the selection of moves excessive and the A.I. more vulnerable to "money plays" than that of Madden NFL 98. Electronic Gaming Monthly's Kraig Kujawa likewise found it too susceptible to "money plays" to consider it as outstanding as Madden, though his co-reviewer Dean Hager held NFL GameDay 98 to be the better of the two games. GamePro, while giving it a 4.5 out of 5 in sound and a perfect 5.0 in every other category (graphics, control, and fun factor), found it to be less realistic than Madden, likening it to stepping outside during the Super Bowl to play street football. Next Generation, however, asserted that if Madden NFL 98 were to outsell NFL GameDay 98, "then there is a serious problem with the game-buying public."

In 1997 Electronic Gaming Monthly named it the 31st best console video game of all time (while ranking Madden NFL 98 as 19th best), citing its revolutionary 3D graphics and solid gameplay, and named it a runner-up for "Sports Game of the Year" (behind International Superstar Soccer 64).

The game was nominated for the "Best PlayStation Game" award at the CNET Gamecenter Awards for 1997, which went to Final Fantasy VII. It was also a finalist for the Academy of Interactive Arts & Sciences' "Console Sports Game of the Year" and "Outstanding Achievement in Software Engineering" at the 1st Annual Interactive Achievement Awards, which went to International Superstar Soccer 64 and GoldenEye 007, respectively.

== Sales ==
The game sold more than 1.4 million copies by September 1998. It went on to sell nearly 2 million units.
