= NFL GameDay 2002 =

2001 PS1 and PS2 video game

- Developers: Red Zone Interactive; 989 Sports
- Publisher: Sony Computer Entertainment
- Series: NFL GameDay
- Platforms: PlayStation, PlayStation 2
- Release: PlayStation: NA: August 7, 2001; PlayStation 2: NA: December 4, 2001
- Genre: Sports
- Modes: Single-player, multiplayer

NFL GameDay 2002 is a 2001 American football video game developed by 989 Sports and Red Zone Interactive and published by Sony Computer Entertainment for the PlayStation and the PlayStation 2 in 2001. On the cover is Donovan McNabb.

== Reception ==
Reception

Aggregate score
| Aggregator | Score | |
| Aggregator | PS | PS2 |
|---|---|---|
| Metacritic | 62/100 | 51/100 |

Review scores
| Publication | Score | |
| Publication | PS | PS2 |
|---|---|---|
| AllGame | N/A | 1.5/5 |
| Electronic Gaming Monthly | 4.83/10 | 2.67/10 |
| Game Informer | 6/10 | 5/10 |
| GamePro | 4/5 | 2/5 |
| GameRevolution | C | D |
| GameSpot | 8.1/10 | 6.8/10 |
| IGN | N/A | 6/10 |
| Next Generation | 4/5 | N/A |
| Official U.S. PlayStation Magazine | 2/5 | 1.5/5 |
| PlayStation: The Official Magazine | 6/10 | 3/10 |

The game received "mixed" reviews on both platforms according to the review aggregation website Metacritic, though the PlayStation version was a little more well-received than the PlayStation 2 version. Jim Preston of NextGen said that the former console version "restores some of the shine to the franchise."
