= NBA ShootOut (video game) =

1996 video game

- North American cover art
- Developer(s): Sony Computer Entertainment Europe
- Publisher(s): Sony Computer Entertainment
- Producer(s): Jules Burt; Jason Perkins; John Roberts
- Programmer(s): Richard Lee; Mark Green; Paul Nath; Jules Burt
- Artist(s): Jason Millson; Nikki Bridgman; Paul Mulliner
- Composer(s): Harry Holmwood
- Series: NBA ShootOut
- Platform(s): PlayStation
- Release: EU: 20 March 1996; NA: 28 March 1996
- Genre(s): Sports
- Mode(s): Single-player, multiplayer

NBA ShootOut (Known as Total NBA '96 in Europe) is a 1996 basketball video game developed and published by Sony Computer Entertainment for the PlayStation. The cover features Sam Cassell of the Houston Rockets. It is the first video game to be developed internally at Sony Computer Entertainment Europe.

== Gameplay ==
NBA ShootOut is a game which features polygon generated basketball players with motion-captured animation. The game features rosters from the 1995–96 NBA season.

The demo of the European version of the game, (Total NBA '96) also contains additional hidden characters not available in the final game.

== Reception ==
Reception

Review scores
Publication	Score
Computer and Video Games	84/100
Electronic Gaming Monthly	15.5/20
GameFan	98/100 (Note: In GameFan's review, one critic scored NBA ShootOut 97/100, another 99/100.)
GamePro	5/5
Hyper	93/100
IGN	6/10
PlayStation Official Magazine – UK	9/10

NBA ShootOut was well received, with the Official UK PlayStation Magazine awarding 9/10 and a Starplayer award. They praised the motion capture and the playability. While he noted sometimes inaccurate controls and glitchy sound effects, Scary Larry of GamePro gave the game a strong recommendation, citing the roster of real players, realistic features, beautiful polygonal graphics, and fluid animation. He commented that the game is much more realistic than NBA Jam, but has an arcade mode to satisfy Jam enthusiasts. The two sports reviewers of Electronic Gaming Monthly gave the game similar scores (8.0 and 7.5 out of 10) but were sharply divided in their opinions. Both agreed that the graphics are impressive, but Dindo Perez argued that "Shootout should have played greater emphasis on gameplay", saying it is not realistic enough, whereas Video Cowboy asserted "the game has solid gameplay and a big-league look." A reviewer for Next Generation shared in the general enthusiasm for the game's graphics and animation, but also noted that they come at the cost of prominent slowdown, detracting from the feel of the game. However, he felt the gameplay was decent and the options and player roster were impressive, and concluded "NBA Shoot Out doesn't unseat NBA Live 96 as the basketball sim champ, but it has definitely raised the stakes for next year's battle." He gave it three out of five stars. In 1996, GamesMaster ranked the game 88th on their "Top 100 Games of All Time."

The first NBA ShootOut (Total NBA ' 96) was a major hit in Europe, and moderately successful in North America.
