= NCAA Football 2001 =

2000 video game

- Developer: Sennari Interactive
- Publisher: EA Sports
- Series: NCAA Football
- Platform: PlayStation
- Release: NA: July 26, 2000
- Genres: Sports, American football
- Modes: Single-player, multiplayer

NCAA Football 2001 is a video game of the sports genre released in 2000 by EA Sports. Its cover athlete is former Alabama Crimson Tide running back Shaun Alexander.

== Reception ==
Reception

Aggregate score
Aggregator	Score
GameRankings	82%

Review scores
Publication	Score
CNET Gamecenter	8/10
Electronic Gaming Monthly	7.5/10
EP Daily	9.2/10
GameFan	88% (Note: In GameFan's viewpoint of the game, one critic gave it a score of 89, and the other 86.)
GameSpot	7.9/10
GameSpy	81%
IGN	8.3/10
Official U.S. PlayStation Magazine	3.5/5

The game received favorable reviews according to the review aggregation website GameRankings.
