= NHL FaceOff '97 =

1996 ice hockey video game

- North American cover art
- Developer(s): Killer Game
- Publisher(s): Sony Computer Entertainment
- Platform(s): PlayStation
- Release: NA: October 22, 1996; UK: March, 1997; JP: May 30, 1997
- Genre(s): Sports
- Mode(s): Single-player, multiplayer

NHL FaceOff '97 is an ice hockey video game developed by Killer Game and published by Sony Computer Entertainment for the PlayStation. It is the second game in the NHL FaceOff series.

== Gameplay ==
NHL FaceOff '97 includes new features such as tournament modes, and additional strategy settings.

== Reception ==
Reviews for NHL FaceOff '97 were highly positive. Critics generally remarked that while the sprite-based graphics are dated, the gameplay design, especially the new icon-based passing, make the game superior to other hockey games for the PlayStation. An exception was Hugh Sterbakov of GameSpot, who also praised the icon-based passing but said it was generally the control configuration and sound effects which held the game back, and the graphics which made it still worthwhile. He scored it a 7.9 out of 10. Air Hendrix of GamePro found the icon-based passing gave NHL FaceOff '97 a strategic depth not found in any previous hockey game, and assessed that "Novices and pros alike will find fun, ferocious gameplay and a challenge that doesn't fade." A Next Generation critic concluded, "Overall, NHL Face Off '97 is a great effort, and the quick, easy to get into gameplay makes running through a full season fun again, something that's been missing for far too long." He scored it four out of five stars. The two sports reviewers of Electronic Gaming Monthly gave it a 9.25 out of 10, with Joe Rybicki stating "It's quite simple to pick up, but difficult to master, qualities of some of the best games of all time."

== Reviews ==
- LeveL #26 (03/1997)
- Game Revolution - Jun 04, 2004
- Official UK PlayStation Magazine - 1997
