= NBA ShootOut 2002 =

2001 video game

- Developer: Killer Game
- Publisher: Sony Computer Entertainment
- Platform: PlayStation
- Release: NA: September 21, 2001
- Genre: Sports
- Modes: Single-player, multiplayer

NBA ShootOut 2002 is a 2001 basketball video game developed by Killer Game and published by Sony Computer Entertainment for the PlayStation. It was only released in North America under 989 Sports. A PlayStation 2 version was in development, but it was ultimately cancelled. Stephon Marbury is featured on the cover.

== Reception ==
Reception

Aggregate score
Aggregator	Score
Metacritic	53/100

Review scores
Publication	Score
AllGame	2/5
Electronic Gaming Monthly	5.33/10
Game Informer	4.75/10
GamePro	2.5/5
GameSpot	6.1/10
Official U.S. PlayStation Magazine	3.5/5

The game received "mixed" reviews according to the review aggregation website Metacritic.
