= NBA ShootOut '97 =

1997 video game

- Developer: Sony Computer Entertainment Europe
- Publisher: Sony Computer Entertainment
- Programmers: Ben Fawcett; Chris Emsen; John Conners; Paul Nath
- Artists: Antonia Blackler; Mario Allen; Simon Fenton
- Composers: Richard Joseph; Jason Page
- Series: NBA ShootOut
- Platform: PlayStation
- Release: EU: 20 March 1997; NA: 11 March 1997; JP: 27 June 1997
- Genre: Sports
- Modes: Single-player, multiplayer

NBA ShootOut '97 (Total NBA '97 in Europe) is a 1997 basketball video game developed and published by Sony Computer Entertainment for the PlayStation. It is the second installment of the NBA ShootOut series. The cover features Eddie Jones of the Los Angeles Lakers. It is the final game in the series to be developed by Sony Computer Entertainment Europe, with Sony Interactive Studios America replacing them for later installments.

== Gameplay ==
ShootOut 97 features rosters from the 1996–97 NBA season. However, the game does not include Michael Jordan, Charles Barkley and Shaquille O'Neal, as they were replaced with custom players named "Roster Guard", "Roster Forward" and "Roster Center" respectively.

== Reception ==
Reception

Aggregate score
Aggregator	Score
GameRankings	87%

Review scores
Publication	Score
AllGame	4/5
Edge	9/10
Electronic Gaming Monthly	9/10
Famitsu	27/40
Game Informer	8.75/10
GameFan	(favorable)
GameRevolution	B+
GameSpot	7.9/10
IGN	9/10
Next Generation	4/5
PlayStation Official Magazine – UK	9/10
Entertainment Weekly	B+

Most critics hailed NBA ShootOut '97 as a dramatic improvement over the original. Kraig Kujawa and Dean Hager of Electronic Gaming Monthly praised the faster game speed and new icon passing system. Kujawa wrote a longer review of the game for GameSpot, in which he additionally complimented the authentic NBA sounds and visuals and criticized the small play book. GamePro gave it a 3.5 out of 5 in sound and a perfect 5.0 in every other category (graphics, control, and fun factor), saying that it "shakes up the basketball world, cooking the court with spectacular, slam-dunkin' gameplay and the most realistic five-on-five hoops action ever brought to the 32-bit arena." Like Kujawa and Hager, they highly approved of the icon passing system. A Next Generation critic called the game "the first true basketball simulation for a console", elaborating that unlike previous basketball video games, the statistics have a significant impact on how players perform in actual gameplay. He also commented positively on the icon passing, but said the game was not as fun as NBA In the Zone 2 due to the controls, explaining that "the game has an almost clinical feel, almost as if the player isn't really affecting the outcome of plays."

The game held an 87%, based on five reviews, on the review aggregation website GameRankings. In Japan, where the game was released under the name Total NBA '97 (トータルNBA'97, Tōtaru NBA '97), on June 27, 1997, Famitsu gave it a score of 27 out of 40.
