= NCAA Gamebreaker =

1996 video game

- Cover featuring Eddie George
- Developer: Sony Interactive Studios America
- Publisher: Sony Computer Entertainment America
- Programmers: Kelly Walker; Amir Zbeda; Bill Long; Chris Foley
- Composer: USC Trojan Marching Band
- Platform: PlayStation
- Release: NA: September 19, 1996
- Genre: Sports
- Modes: Single-player, multiplayer

NCAA Football GameBreaker, also known as NCAA GameBreaker, is a 1996 American football video game developed by Sony Interactive Studios America and published by Sony Computer Entertainment for the PlayStation. It was released only in North America. The cover athlete is the 1995 Heisman winning Ohio State running back Eddie George.

== Gameplay ==
NCAA Gamebreaker is the first 32-bit college football video game published.

== Reception ==
Next Generation reviewed the PlayStation version of the game, rating it four stars out of five, and stated that "Gamebreaker is the best college football game on the market and one of the best football games period."

== Reviews ==
- Electronic Gaming Monthly (Sep, 1996)
- Game Revolution - Jun 04, 2004
- Electronic Gaming Monthly - Oct, 1996
- All Game Guide - 1998
- IGN - Nov 25, 1996
- GameSpot - Dec 01, 1996
