= NBA ShootOut 2001 =

2000 video game

- Developers: Killer Game (PS1); 989 Sports (PS2)
- Publisher: Sony Computer Entertainment
- Platforms: PlayStation, PlayStation 2
- Release: PlayStation: NA: October 24, 2000; PlayStation 2: NA: February 21, 2001
- Genre: Sports (Basketball)
- Modes: Single-player, Multiplayer

NBA ShootOut 2001 is a 2000 basketball video game developed by Killer Game and published by Sony Computer Entertainment for the PlayStation. A port developed by 989 Sports for the PlayStation 2 was released in 2001. Chris Webber is featured on the game's cover.

== Reception ==
Reception

Aggregate score
| Aggregator | Score | |
| Aggregator | PS | PS2 |
|---|---|---|
| Metacritic | 71/100 | 54/100 |

Review scores
| Publication | Score | |
| Publication | PS | PS2 |
|---|---|---|
| AllGame | 3/5 | N/A |
| Electronic Gaming Monthly | 5.83/10 | 4.67/10 |
| Game Informer | 5.5/10 | 6.5/10 |
| GamePro | 5/5 | N/A |
| GameRevolution | N/A | D |
| GameSpot | 6.7/10 | 6.8/10 |
| GameSpy | 82% | N/A |
| IGN | 6.3/10 | 6/10 |
| Official U.S. PlayStation Magazine | 2.5/5 | 2.5/5 |
| PlayStation: The Official Magazine | 4/10 | 5/10 |
| The Cincinnati Enquirer | N/A | 4/5 |

The game received "mixed or average reviews" on both platforms according to the review aggregation website Metacritic.
