= NFL GameDay (video game series) =

- Genre: Sports
- Developer: 989 Sports
- Publisher: 989 Sports
- Platforms: PlayStation; Microsoft Windows; PlayStation 2
- First release: NFL GameDay; December 4, 1995
- Latest release: NFL GameDay 2005; August 1, 2004

NFL GameDay is a series of American football video games for the PlayStation and PlayStation 2 video game consoles. NFL GameDay directly competed with EA Sports' Madden NFL Football and Sega's NFL 2K franchises. The NFL GameDay series began with NFL GameDay released for the 1995–96 NFL season and ended with NFL GameDay 2005 following EA's acquisition of exclusive NFL licensing. The games were designed by 989 Sports (originally Sony Interactive Studios America) throughout their ten-year duration.

== Games ==
=== NFL GameDay ===
NFL GameDay is the first video game in the NFL GameDay series. It was released in 1995 on the PlayStation by Sony Interactive Studios America as a competitor to the Madden football game series. Its cover athlete is William Floyd.

The game makes use of motion capture for its animations.

=== NFL GameDay '97 ===
NFL GameDay '97 is the second video game in the NFL GameDay series. It was released on November 30, 1996 on the PlayStation by Sony Interactive Studios America. On the cover is Daryl Johnston. Gameday 97 includes new options & features like season-ending injuries, a full-fledged draft, more statistics, and the ability to create players. It features all 30 NFL teams (1,500 NFLPA players) and modeled stadiums, including real NFL uniforms with real logos and numbers.

Motion capture was again used, with Tim Brown being the motion capture actor. In order to avoid a common complaint against competitor Madden NFL - that the A.I. can consistently be beaten with a specific play - the developers hired a full-time game tester whose job was specifically to find such plays and report them so that a counter could be developed.

=== NFL GameDay 98 ===
NFL GameDay 98 is the third video game in the NFL GameDay series. It was released July 31, 1997 on the PlayStation by Sony Interactive Studios America. On the cover is Jerome Bettis. It was the first football video game to feature 3D polygonal graphics; it took longer for football games to adopt fully polygonal graphics than other genres because their large number of players and requisite fast pace made it difficult to do so at a reasonable frame rate.

=== NFL GameDay 99 ===
NFL GameDay 99 is the fourth game in the NFL GameDay series. It was released July 31, 1998 on the PlayStation, and August 31, 1998 on the PC, both by 989 Sports. On the cover is Terrell Davis.

=== NFL GameDay 2000 ===
NFL GameDay 2000 is the fifth video game in the NFL GameDay series. It was released July 31, 1999 on the PlayStation by 989 Sports. On the cover is Terrell Davis.

=== NFL GameDay 2001 ===
NFL GameDay 2001 is the sixth video game in the NFL GameDay series, and the first to be released on the PlayStation 2. It was released October 30, 2000 on the PlayStation, and November 20, 2000 on the PlayStation 2, both by 989 Sports. On the cover is Marshall Faulk.

=== NFL GameDay 2002 ===
NFL GameDay 2002 is the seventh video game in the NFL GameDay series. It was released August 6, 2001 on the PlayStation, and December 4, 2001 on the PlayStation 2, both by 989 Sports. On the cover is Donovan McNabb.

=== NFL GameDay 2003 ===
NFL GameDay 2003 is the eighth video game in the NFL GameDay series. It was released August 13, 2002 on the PlayStation and PlayStation 2, both by 989 Sports. On the cover is Tom Brady.

=== NFL GameDay 2004 ===
NFL GameDay 2004 is the ninth video game in the NFL GameDay series. It was released in 2003 on the PlayStation and PlayStation 2, both by 989 Sports. On the cover is LaDainian Tomlinson.

=== NFL GameDay 2005 ===
NFL GameDay 2005 is the tenth and final game in the NFL GameDay series, and unlike the last few GameDay video games, it is only available on the PlayStation console, and not on the PlayStation 2. It was released on August 1, 2004. On the cover is Derrick Brooks. It was the last first-party (Sony) game published for the PlayStation though there were sporadic official releases in 2005 and 2006 by others.

== Reception ==
Next Generation ranked the series at #43 in its list of the Fifty Best Games of All Time, writing: "Constantly innovative, NFL Game Day was the first football game to add advanced player controls and 3D graphics."

== See also ==
- ESPN Sunday Night NFL, Sony's predecessor for SNES, Sega Genesis and Sega CD
