= PlayStation Analog Joystick =

Analog controller for the PlayStation

PlayStation Analog Joysticks
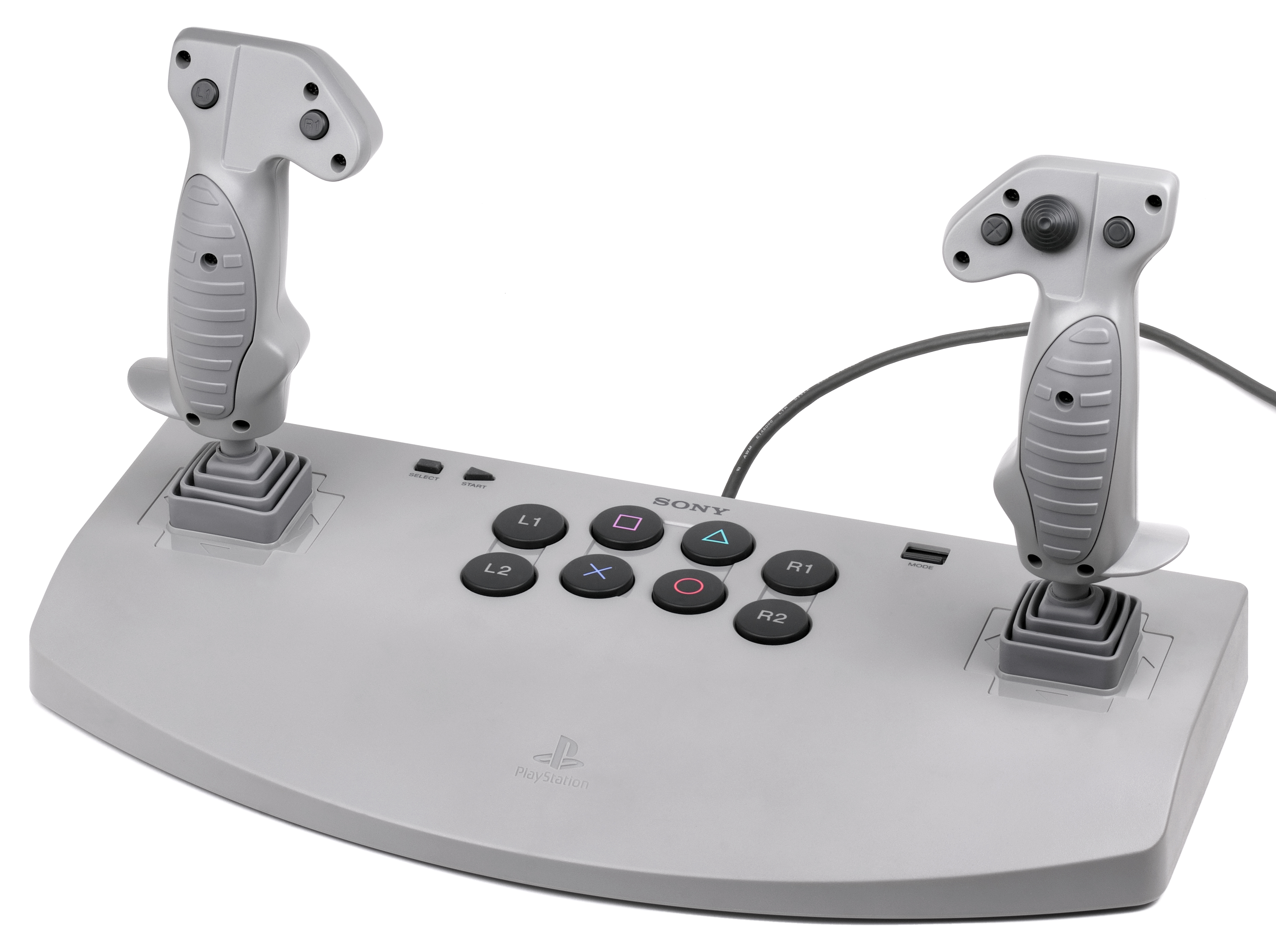
- Sony's Analog Joystick (SCPH-1110)
- Developer: Sony Computer Entertainment
- Manufacturer: Sony
- Type: Game controller
- Generation: Fifth
- Released: April 26, 1996
- Connectivity: PlayStation controller port

The PlayStation Analog Joystick (SCPH-1110) is Sony's first analog controller for the PlayStation, and is the precursor to the PlayStation Dual Analog Controller. It is often incorrectly referred to as the "Sony Flightstick" (not to be confused with the Flightstick line of joysticks for PlayStation consoles by third-party peripheral manufacturer Hori).

== History ==
Announced to the public in August 1995, the Analog Joystick was released to the public in Japan on 26 April 1996.

== Features ==
The Analog Joystick used potentiometer technology previously used on consoles such as the Vectrex; instead of relying on binary eight-way switches, the controller can detect minute angular changes through the entire range of motion. The stick also features a thumb-operated digital hat switch on the right joystick, corresponding to the traditional D-pad, and used for instances when simple digital movements were necessary.

A compatibility mode for the Analog Joystick was included in the Dual Analog Controller, Sony's first analog revision of its original gamepad design.

PS1 games that support the Analog Joystick have an "Analog Joystick Compatible" icon on the back cover.

The Analog Joystick has a switch to select either analog or digital mode. When in the digital mode, both sticks function as the gamepad on a regular PS1 controller. Older PS1 games that do not support the PS1 DualShock sticks can work with the Analog Joystick.

== List of games with Analog Joystick support ==
PlayStation

- Ace Combat 2
- Ace Combat 3
- Adidas Power Soccer 98
- Apocalypse
- Arcade's Greatest Hits: The Midway Collection 2 (used in Blaster)
- Armored Trooper Votoms (Japan)
- Armorines: Project S.W.A.R.M.
- Asteroids
- Atari Anniversary Edition Redux
- Atari Collection 2 (Paperboy, RoadBlasters, Marble Madness)
- ATV Racers
- Batman: Gotham City Racer
- Bogey Dead 6 (Japan as Sidewinder / Europe as Raging Skies), released at the same time as the Analog Joystick
- Crash Bandicoot: Warped
- Castrol Honda Superbike Racing
- Centipede
- Car & Driver Grand Tour Racing '98
- Choro Q Jet: Rainbow Wings (Japan)
- Colony Wars
- Colony Wars: Vengeance
- Cyberia
- Descent
- Descent Maximum
- Digital Glider Airman (Japan)
- Elemental Gearbolt
- EOS: Edge of Skyhigh (Japan)
- Formula 1 98
- Galaxian 3 (Japan & Europe)
- Gran Turismo
- Gran Turismo 2
- Gunship 2000 (Japan)
- Independence Day
- Iron Soldier 3
- Macross Digital Mission VF-X (Japan)
- Macross Digital Mission VF-X 2 (Japan)
- MDK
- MechWarrior 2: 31st Century Combat
- Metal Gear Solid
- Michael Owen's World League Soccer 99
- Missile Command
- Mobile Suit Z Gundam (Japan)
- Motor Toon Grand Prix 2 (known as Motor Toon Grand Prix in North America)
- Namco Museum Vol. 4 (Assault and Assault Plus only)
- NASCAR 98
- Need for Speed II
- Newman / Haas Racing
- Nightmare Creatures
- Panzer Front (known in Japanese: パンツァーフロント, Hepburn: Pantsā Furonto)
- Pitfall 3D: Beyond the Jungle
- Porsche Challenge
- Project GaiaRay (Japan)
- Quake II
- Racing Lagoon (Japan)
- RayCrisis
- Rise 2: Resurrection
- R/C Stunt Copter
- S.C.A.R.S.
- Sled Storm
- Shadow Master
- Sidewinder 2
- Slamscape
- Spyro 2: Ripto's Rage! (Known as Spyro 2: Gateway to Glimmer in Australia and Europe)
- Spyro: Year of the Dragon
- Spyro the Dragon
- Star Fighter
- Star Ixiom
- Star Wars: Demolition
- Steel Reign
- Supercross 2000
- Syphon Filter
- Syphon Filter 2
- Syphon Filter 3
- Test Drive 4 (Only supported in NTSC-U and PAL versions)
- Test Drive: Off-Road 3
- TFX: Tactical Fighter eXperiment
- The Need for Speed (supports digital mode only)
- The Operation Death Wing
- Treasures of the Deep
- U.S. Navy Fighters
- Vehicle Cavalier (Japan)
- Velldeselba Senki: Tsubasa-No-Kunshou
- Vigilante 8
- Wing Commander IV: The Price of Freedom
- Wing Over 2
- XS Moto
- Zero Pilot (Japan)

PlayStation 2

- R-Type Final (Both Analog and Digital mode)
- XG3: Extreme G Racing (Both Analog and Digital Mode)

There are other PS2 games that also can use the PS1 analog joystick, but only in digital mode. Metal Slug Anthology, Gradius III, Gradius IV and other games that normally use just the gamepad and buttons for controls.

== List of games with partial Analog Joystick support ==
The following games support the controller's "analog" mode, but force the player to use the digital "hat switch" instead of the analog sticks:

- 007: Tomorrow Never Dies
- 007: The World is Not Enough
- Colony Wars: Red Sun
- Crash Team Racing
- Echo Night (video game)
- FIFA 99
- FIFA 2000
- FIFA 2001
- Klonoa
- NHL 98
- Starblade Alpha
- Street Fighter Alpha 3
- Strike Point

And the following games are fully supported, but have issues that can affect gameplay:

- Ape Escape - the lack of L3 and R3 buttons on the controller makes some sections unplayable
- Tempest X3 - works fully, but the game is set to auto-fire with the analog joystick connected
- World's Scariest Police Chases - the game will not recognise the analog sticks unless a Dual Shock is connected first and then replaced with the controller

== Reception ==
GamePro's The Rat Baron praised the controller for its comfort, tight control, button layout, and analog movement, though he expressed doubt that most players would go for it given the high price tag.

The Analog Joystick did not sell well in Japan, reportedly due to its high cost and bulky size.

== Legacy ==
The Analog Joystick can be connected to a PC via a USB adapter and also via a DirectPad-Pro-style parallel port interface which can be accessed under Windows using the DirectPad or other drivers. The Allegro library provides the same functionality for developers.

== See also ==
- Dual Analog Controller
