= Rally Cross (video game) =

1997 video game

- North American cover art
- Developer: Sony Interactive Studios America
- Publisher: Sony Computer Entertainment
- Producer: Ken George
- Programmer: Mark Lyons
- Artist: Scott Atkins
- Composer: Rex Baca
- Platform: PlayStation
- Release: NA: February 28, 1997; PAL: July 10, 1997; JP: July 17, 1997
- Genre: Racing
- Modes: Single-player, multiplayer

Rally Cross is a 1997 racing video game developed by Sony Interactive Studios America and published by Sony Computer Entertainment for the PlayStation. It is centered around rallying and off-road racing. It received positive reviews for its graphics, content, playability and four-player multiplayer. It was followed up by a sequel named Rally Cross 2. The game was re-released on January 16, 2024 on PlayStation 4 and PlayStation 5 as a part of the PlayStation Plus Classics Catalog.

== Gameplay ==
Screenshot of Rally Cross

The game is fully compatible with the Dual Analog Controller, even with the vibration feature present in the Japanese version of the controller. The game supports up to four players via a split screen.

== Reception ==
Reception

Aggregate score
Aggregator	Score
GameRankings	85.40% (10 reviews)

Review scores
Publication	Score
Electronic Gaming Monthly	8.75/10
GameSpot	7.7/10
Next Generation	4/5
Fort Worth Star-Telegram	4/5

Critics typically compared the game to Sega Rally Championship, identifying the major difference from the Sega game as the more dramatic consequences of driving over unfavorable terrain, which results in an emphasis on careful driving rather than speed. Opinions on this aspect of the game varied. Kraig Kujawa, who reviewed Rally Cross in both Electronic Gaming Monthly and GamePro, hailed it as a major innovation for the racing genre, assessing that it makes the game more realistic and creates a more intelligent challenge. Kujawa's EGM co-reviewer Dean Hager noted that it results in slower racing, but agreed that the overall experience is more challenging and overall better than Sega Rally Championship. A reviewer for Next Generation echoed Hager to an extent: "What the game lacks in outright speed, however, is more than made up for by the strategy that is required to select the best line through the undulating tracks." However, he argued that the ease with which cars are flipped over is unrealistic and results in a frustratingly steep learning curve, and concluded the gameplay to ultimately fall second to that of Sega Rally Championship. GamePro's Dr. Zombie took a fairly neutral position, noting that the unique racing style can be mastered but might be disappointing to players who like high-speed racing.

Critics almost unanimously praised the detailed graphics and the high level of replayability resulting from the large number of tracks, variety of vehicles, numerous modes, and four-player capability.

In retrospect, Curtis Moldrich of Red Bull said that the game was "revolutionary" during its time and that it "still one of the best rallying games ever made".
