= Dual analog =

Dual analog may refer to:

- Dual analog control of video games
  - The Dual Analog Controller released by Sony for the PlayStation
- Channel bonding, a computer networking arrangement
