= Dual Analog Controller =

Sony's first handheld analog controller for the PlayStation

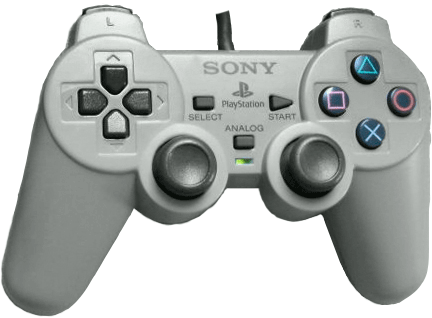
- A Dual Analog controller in "Flightstick" mode
- Developer: Sony Computer Entertainment
- Manufacturer: Sony
- Type: Gamepad
- Generation: Fifth
- Released: JP: 25 April 1997; NA: 27 August 1997; EU: September 1997
- Discontinued: Mid-1998
- Input: 2× analog sticks; 13× Digital buttons (Start, Select, Analog, L1, R1, L2, R2, L3, R3); Digital D-Pad
- Connectivity: PlayStation controller port
- Predecessor: PlayStation controller
- Successor: DualShock

The Dual Analog Controller (SCPH-1150 in Japan, SCPH-1180 in the United States, and SCPH-1180e in Europe) is Sony's first handheld analog controller for the PlayStation, and the predecessor to the DualShock; the first analog controller was the PlayStation Analog Joystick (SCPH-1110). It was also the first controller in the PlayStation family of video game consoles to support force feedback in games, but only on the Japanese-market controller; this functionality was later implemented in the DualShock, which was released internationally.

== History ==
The Dual Analog Controller was first displayed under glass at the PlayStation Expo 96–97, which was held from 1 November to 4 November 1996. It was released in Japan on 25 April 1997, coincident with the Japanese release of vibration and analog-capable title Tobal 2. Bushido Blade, another title fully compatible with the controller, had been released previously in March.

Before its release in the United States, Sony decided that vibration feedback would be removed from the European and American versions of the controller. According to a Sony spokesperson, "We evaluated all the features and decided, for manufacturing reasons, that what was most important to gamers was the analog feature." Reasons for dropping the vibration feedback reportedly included it being linked to premature malfunction of the controllers. There were rumors that Nintendo had attempted to legally block the release of the controller in North America due to the vibration feature's similarity to Nintendo's Rumble Pak, but Nintendo firmly denied it had taken any form of legal action over Sony's controllers. Moreover, according to the United States Patent Office, two employees of Atari Games have held a patent on vibrating game controller technology since March 1991. Another theory for the vibration feedback being dropped was that Sony simply wanted to keep the price of the controller down in order to maximize user adoption.

It was released in the United States on 27 August 1997, and in Europe in September 1997 with little promotion. A few months later, the first DualShock controller was released in Japan on 20 November 1997.

Namco had already released an analog controller for PlayStation called NeGcon. Sony's Dual Analog Controller's analog mode was not compatible with the NeGcon-compatible games like Wipeout and Ridge Racer. However, Need for Speed II, Gran Turismo, and Gran Turismo 2 feature compatibility with both NeGcon and Dual Analog control schemes.

Fans of a smaller form factor, Japanese players complained the very long hand grips made the controller too large to be held properly and the lack of a rumble feature in the U.S. and European models are the most commonly cited reasons that Sony decided to end production of this controller and redesign it. This redesign eventually became the DualShock.

The Dual Analog controller was discontinued in all three markets in 1998, to be replaced by the DualShock.

== Features ==
=== Operation modes ===
The Dual Analog controller has three modes of operation: Digital, which disables the Analog sticks, Analog (as also found on DualShock/DualShock 2 controllers) and an Analog Flightstick mode emulating the PlayStation Analog Joystick that is not available on the DualShock or DualShock 2.

If a PlayStation game is DualShock or Dual Analog compatible, the player may press the Analog button located between the two analog sticks to activate the analog mode. This is indicated by a red LED. If the Dual Analog controller is switched to analog mode while using a game which is not analog-compatible, the game will not register any button presses or, in some cases, the game will consider the controller to be detached. This is due to the fact the controller's type ID that is reported to the game is changed when the button is pressed.

The ability to emulate Sony's own PlayStation Analog Joystick by pressing the "Analog" button a second time to reveal a green LED (this was commonly referred to as "Flightstick Mode") provided a less expensive alternative to the FlightStick Analog Joystick and retailed for an average of US$35 compared to the Flightstick's retail price of US$70.

Similarly to the Nintendo 64 controller, the Dual Analog Controller was designed to be held in four different ways: standard control, in which the left thumb uses the directional buttons and the right thumb uses the action buttons; analog control, in which the left thumb uses the left analog stick and the right thumb uses the action buttons; dual analog control, which imitates the Dual Analog Joystick, with both thumbs positioned over the analog sticks, and the shoulder buttons used instead of the action buttons; and analog-digital control, in which the left thumb uses the directional buttons, the right thumb uses the right analog stick, and the shoulder buttons are again used for actions.

MechWarrior 2, Ace Combat 2, Descent Maximum, and Colony Wars were among the shortlist of 27 PlayStation Flightstick compatible games.

=== Vibration support ===
The Japanese version of the controller (SCPH-1150) includes a vibration feedback feature, making it the first controller under the PlayStation brand to support force feedback technology. However, this feature is absent on all controllers released overseas, including those from North America and Europe (SCPH-1180 and SCPH-1180e respectively). It has a single vibration motor, similar to that of the Rumble Pak for the Nintendo 64, and is located on the left-hand side of the controller. Unlike the Rumble Pak which is powered by a battery, the vibration motor is powered directly by the PlayStation.

The DualShock, which was the first internationally-released controller in the PlayStation brand to support force feedback, adds a larger vibration motor in addition to the standard one (which has been moved to the right-hand side of the controller as the larger motor is placed in the location where the Dual Analog's vibration motor would go) for a total of two, allowing for vibration effects in stereo; this can however result in compatibility issues with the Dual Analog Controller when used on DualShock-compatible games as well as on all PlayStation 2 games. On the other hand, games that are compatible with the Dual Analog's vibration capabilities will work with the DualShock.

==== List of games with Dual Analog vibration support ====
The following games supported the vibration feature of the Dual Analog Controller:

- Ace Combat 2 (Japan)
- Ballblazer Champions (US, Japan)
- Bushido Blade (Japan)
- Crash Bandicoot 2: Cortex Strikes Back
- Ghost in the Shell (Japan, Europe)
- MDK (US Jampack demo only) (Note: The Japanese release supported vibration, but uses the newer, DualShock-style method.)
- Porsche Challenge (Europe, US demo only)
- Rally Cross
- Tobal 2

== Differences from DualShock ==
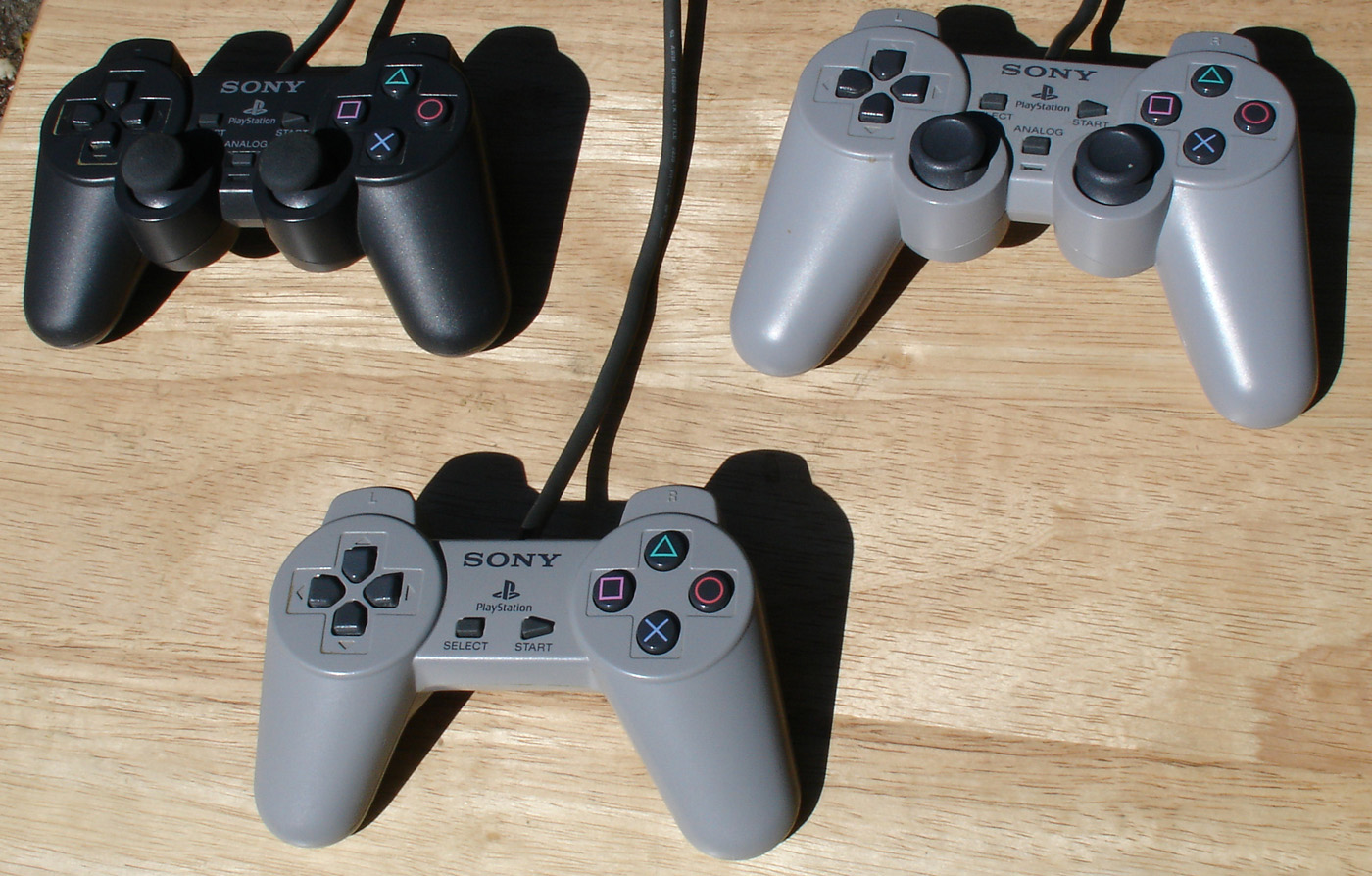
Clockwise from top left: DualShock, Dual Analog Controller and original PlayStation controller

The Dual Analog controller features several aspects that remain exclusive to it, and were scrapped or redesigned for the release of the DualShock controller.

- Only the Japanese version features a vibration feedback function. The European and American versions of the controller do however include circuitry and mounts for a rumble motor, a possible leftover from the Japanese version of the controller, and therefore installing the motor is a simple process. Due to a lack of vibration-compatible games at the time, the European and American versions were not shipped with rumble feedback and, as a result, weigh significantly less than their overseas counterpart, and fall somewhere between the weights of the standard controller and the DualShock. The rumble functionality, even when installed on overseas controllers, will not work on all PlayStation 2 software due to compatibility issues.
- The hand grips are 1.5 centimetres (0.59 in) longer than the original controller and the later DualShock controller. The body of the controller is also wider, spacing the pads slightly further apart. This wider controller body has been retained on the DualShock and all later PlayStation controllers.
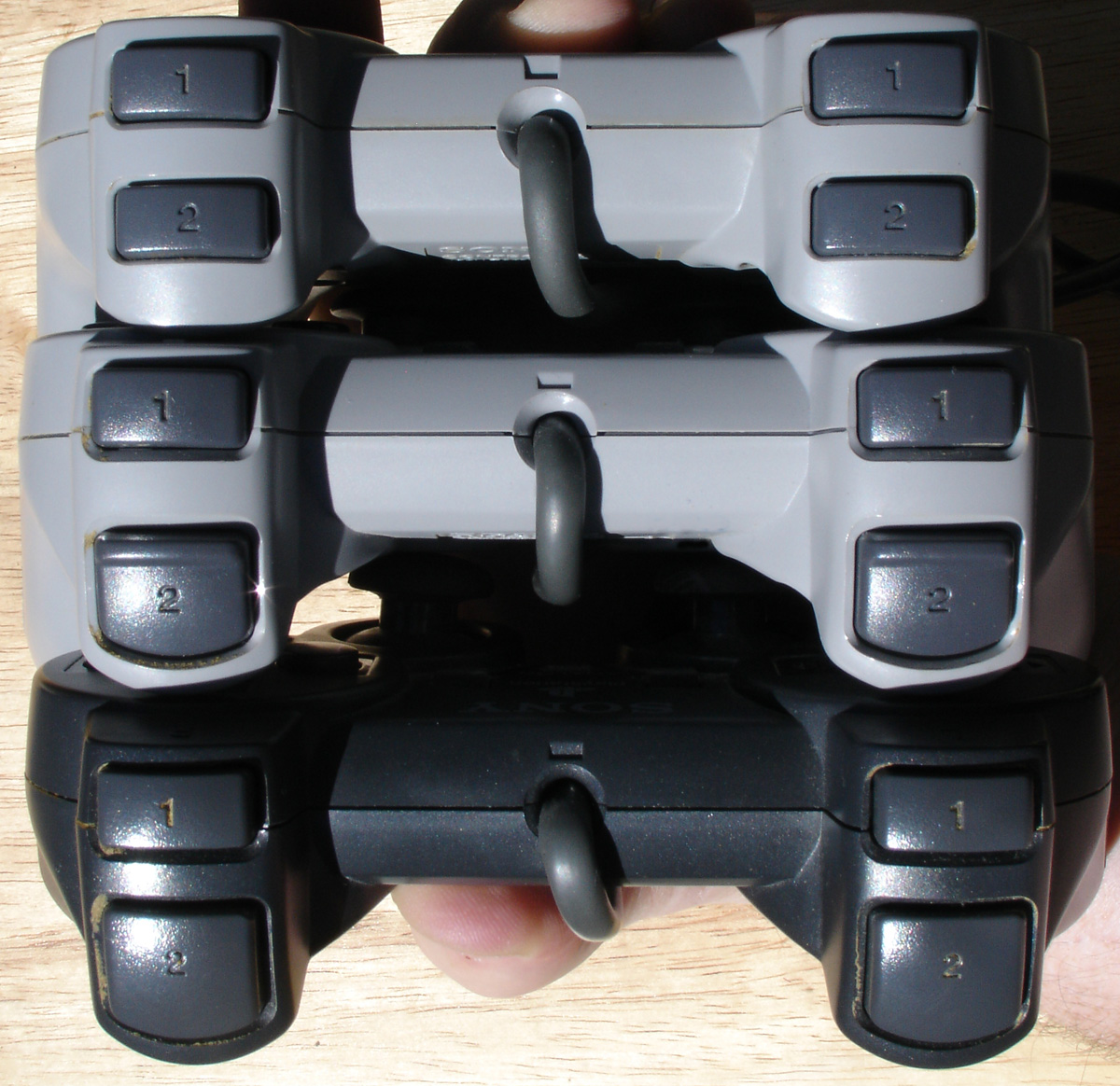
  From the top: the original PlayStation Controller, Dual Analog Controller and DualShock. Note the ridges on the Dual Analog L2 and R2 buttons.
- The L2 and R2 buttons have ridges at the top edge to easily distinguish them from the L1 and R1 buttons and are spaced further apart than the original controller or DualShock. They are also wider than the standard controller, but shorter than the DualShock.
- The analog sticks are concave and lack the rubberised coating that has been used on the DualShock and later controllers, With similarly designed sticks being used years later for the PS4 and PS5's DualShock and DualSense controllers.
- In addition to the standard digital mode and the regular "red LED" Analog mode, there is a third mode that emulates the layout of Sony's own PlayStation Analog Joystick, and is indicated by a green LED. This feature is missing on the DualShock.
- The "Analog" button, used for switching modes, is raised instead of recessed like the DualShock's button and can be more easily hit accidentally.
- The Analog mode cannot be changed or locked by software as it can with the DualShock controller and later.
