= Colony Wars: Vengeance =

1998 video game

- European box art
- Developer: Psygnosis
- Publisher: Psygnosis
- Designer: Mike Ellis
- Programmer: Mike Anthony
- Artist: Dave Crook
- Composer: Stephen Murphy
- Series: Colony Wars
- Platform: PlayStation
- Release: NA: 3 November 1998; EU: 24 November 1998
- Genre: Space combat simulator
- Mode: Single-player

Colony Wars: Vengeance is a 1998 space combat simulator video game developed and published by Psygnosis for the PlayStation. It is a sequel to the original Colony Wars, released the previous year. In this game, players complete space combat missions using preselected starships equipped with various weapons. The game features multiple paths of missions and outcomes, depending on the player's performance. The game retains the win-lose scenario styling of its predecessor, only now the player controls a pilot, Mertens, who has enlisted in the Colonial Navy.

== Gameplay ==
Players do combat in mostly space missions using one of four Colonial Navy starfighters. Each starfighter carries a certain combination of energy weapons, missiles or torpedoes, and a number of units are equipped with nonlethal EMP cannons. The player can also use countermeasures to shake off inbound enemy missiles or use a grapple gun to capture targets of importance. The game introduces the ability to upgrade the starfighters' attributes in terms of engine power, maneuverability, shield capacity, and afterburner duration through power pods collected after missions. The heads-up display also introduces a lead pursuit indicator to assist the player in targeting the enemy with cannon shots.

Missions set in planetary atmospheres are available for the first time in the series, with players getting to pilot the Navy's Spook drop ship. Some missions may involve the player facing giant League boss machines called "Sentinels".

The stages are divided into several "Acts" with a number of missions each. Multiple paths and outcomes are available throughout the game, depending on the player's performance. Completing or failing missions does not always define the ultimate success or failure of the campaign, and certain missions are turning points which can affect the game's plot.

The player's combat record is visible in the "Pilot Statistics" menu.

== Plot ==
The game is set in 4671, a century after the events of Colony Wars. In the canonical ending, the League of Free Worlds successfully fights the Earth Empire's Colonial Navy into a last stand in the Sol system, where the Navy surprisingly holds their ground. The League pulls out all forces from the system and closes the warp hole, cutting Sol off from the universe. Now devoid of access to fresh resources as a result of the closure, the Empire degrades into civil war over the succeeding decades. Only the appearance of a man named Kron and his brand of anti-League propaganda somehow keeps the Empire together.

Mertens, the player-character, enlists in the Navy and participates in eliminating units of rogue Navy forces—called the Tribe—with his wingmen, Becks and Klein, backing him up. The Navy finally reopens the Sol warp hole and launches its opening salvo against the League; the destruction of a communications outpost allows the Navy to bring in more forces before the League can respond.

The Navy discovers that Gallonigher is no longer the League's capital and must search all systems to find and destroy the new capital. During one intense battle, the Navy is ambushed by a League ace who calls himself "The Widowmaker" and Klein is killed while saving Mertens's life.

As Kron's aggression towards the League grows more fanatical, he creates "The Watch", a secret organization designed to brutally stamp out dissent and espionage activities, with Becks becoming a member and eventually its commander. Anyone who is caught by The Watch is killed and passed off as a suicide or accidental death. Mertens consoles himself with the notion that Kron isn't aware of these atrocities, but his devotion to the leader seems to waver—even as Kron kills subordinates for the most petty of failures. He is later inducted into the group after successfully killing the Widowmaker. Mertens's missions in The Watch concern rooting out a top League spy in the Navy's ranks. As Becks escorts him to the Watch's base for trial during one mission, The Watch alerts everyone that Becks is the spy all along. Mertens kills her and Kron finally disbands the group.

As the Navy closes in on the League capital system, Boreas, a massive alien spacecraft appears during a clash between League and Navy forces and annihilates ships from both sides. It is implied that the war attracted the aliens' attention. Shocked and terrified by this turn of events, the League and Navy soon realize that they must work together to stop this new threat, but Kron is still committed to destroying the League. As a result, all but a hardened few among the Navy's rank-and-file desert him.

Mertens, who has built an impressive combat record and is recognized as one of the finest pilots from either faction, is chosen to command a joint operation to infiltrate an alien base and steal one of these starships. Data from the stolen craft is incorporated in the development of the Navy's new Voodoo advanced starship. The united League-Navy strike forces drive out the aliens from most of human-controlled space, and Mertens travels to the aliens' home system to sabotage this warpgate. With the alien menace removed and the war finally over, both the League and the Navy prepare to celebrate, but Kron has other ideas. Kron and his loyalists were planning to use a super gun to destroy the sun, in an attempt to eliminate the system. The plot failed, and Kron and a few of his loyalists tried to flee the system. In a final showdown, Mertens kills Kron and all of his loyalists.

Through information supplied by the League, the player discovers that Kron was a League ace pilot who crashed on Earth during the final assault on Sol. However, he was actually a psychopath whom the League's leader, the Father, saw as a liability and whose crash he engineered. Kron used his bitterness toward the Father to bring about the entire plot of the game.

=== Bad endings ===
Unlike the first game, only one 'good ending' (the story described above) can be achieved. If the player is defeated at certain points in the game, one of five 'bad endings' result:

- If the player loses any mission in the act "The Price of Discovery", the Navy is virtually defeated and Mertens is one of the thousands of Navy personnel languishing in League prisons. Kron, meanwhile, is captured and humiliated before a crowd of League supporters.
- If defeated in the Sol campaign act "Again Sol's Prisoners", Mertens is one of several Navy pilots prepared for execution by the League amidst a snow-capped courtyard. Thinking that fighting the Empire again in Sol was a second shot at ending tyranny, the League seals Sol with a system-wide bomb grid. Kron prepares another ace up his sleeve: hypermatter torpedoes he will fire on the Sun to make it go supernova and destroy the entire system.
- If the player fails a mission in either the Cronus Acts "Tests of Unity" or "Growing Defiance," the Navy is totally defeated and Kron is killed. Mertens' craft runs out of power in deep space.
- If the player fails a mission in the Alpha Centauri acts "Suspicion or Blame" or "Trial of the Judges," Mertens is jailed by The Watch. He is brought before a court on trumped-up charges and hopes that Kron can step in and save the Navy before it's too late. It is assumed that the Navy gets filled with corruption.
- If the player fails a mission in the Boreas Acts "A New Threat", "Humanity's Hope", and the "Madness of Kron", the Earth Empire dissolves into civil war again as the truth about Kron's real origins comes to light.

== Soundtrack ==
The music played during selected pre-rendered cut scenes was taken from Symphony No. 9 (Dvořák) (specifically parts of the first movement) and The Hebrides (overture) by Felix Mendelssohn.

== Development ==
The development team for Colony Wars: Vengeance was twice the size of the one which created the original Colony Wars. The game was originally announced under the title Colony Wars: Codename Vendetta.

The spaceships were modeled after real-life military weapons.

Summarizing the programming changes from the original Colony Wars, the game's producer, Lol Scagg, said, "We've totally rewritten the AI routines, we've rewritten the collision routines, and we've optimized the code so that you'll see a 30 percent increase in speed."

== Reception ==
Reception

Aggregate score
Aggregator	Score
GameRankings	86.67%

PlayStation Official Magazine – UK praised the game in issue No. 39, giving it a 9/10 score and summarising with the following statement: "A great game. Buy it Now". It also received an average score of 86.67% at GameRankings, based on an aggregate of 12 reviews.

== Sequel ==
In 2000 a sequel was released, named Colony Wars: Red Sun.
