= Colony Wars: Red Sun =

2000 video game

- European box art
- Developer: Psygnosis
- Publishers: EU: Sony Computer Entertainment; NA: Midway
- Producer: Dave Semmens
- Designers: Simon Stratford; Jody Cobb; Scott Naylor
- Programmers: Mike Chilton (lead); Graeme Baird; Simon Booth; Julian Gold
- Artists: Ben Devereau; Chris Hogg
- Composer: Gary McKill
- Series: Colony Wars
- Platform: PlayStation
- Release: EU: 24 March 2000; NA: 1 June 2000
- Genre: Space combat simulator
- Mode: Single-player

Colony Wars: Red Sun (called Colony Wars III: Red Sun in North America) is a 2000 space combat simulator video game developed by Psygnosis and published by Sony Computer Entertainment for the PlayStation. It is a sequel to Colony Wars in 1997 and Colony Wars: Vengeance in 1998. Instead of being a starfighter pilot for the League of Free Worlds or the Colonial Navy, the player now assumes the role of a civilian miner-turned-mercenary.

The game was originally set for release in North America by Psygnosis in March 2000, before it was delayed a few times, once to early April, then to late April or early May, and then to 1 June after being picked up by Midway Games.

== Gameplay ==
Players can choose to engage in a variety of space and atmospheric combat missions using one of nine spacecraft. Each starfighter carries a certain combination of weapons. The player earns money for killing enemy targets or completing missions, which vary from simple intercepts to escort duties. The money earned can be used to buy more advanced spacecraft and weapons. Although the spacecraft have a certain combination of weapons, the game introduces an upgrade system where players can insert new weapons and parts into a number of predetermined slots on the vehicle. However, there are limitations: the player cannot install more than three of the same kind of laser. These parts can include scatter guns, subspace dampeners, and drones of various purposes. The velocity sight used in Vengeance also returns.

When fighting any large space vessels, the player is now given a chance to target individual parts of the ship, such as gun turrets.

Compared to the more linear structure of the first two games, Red Sun incorporates a more 'open world' structure with increased role playing elements. Since the player is a mercenary, a number of missions are arrayed in the Status Menu for the player to choose from, but only those marked with the letter P must be finished to advance the plot of the game. Engaging in non-story critical missions allows the player to earn money and purchase ships and weapon upgrades to help progression through the main campaign.

== Premise ==
The game is set around the time frame of Vengeance. A miner in the Dendray system named Alexander Lyron Valdemar experiences strange dreams about an alien race called the Sha'Har and a mysterious ship called the Red Sun. A man known as the General forces him to get on the case of investigating the Red Sun and how it is tied to the survival of the galaxy.

== Reception ==
Reception

Aggregate score
Aggregator	Score
GameRankings	84%

Review scores
Publication	Score
CNET Gamecenter	8/10
Electronic Gaming Monthly	8/10 (Note: Four critics of Electronic Gaming Monthly gave the game each a score of 8/10 in an early review.)
EP Daily	9/10
Game Informer	8.25/10
GameFan	(G.N.) 88% 84% (Note: In GameFan's early viewpoint of the game, three critics gave it each a score of 70, 91, and 90.)
GameSpot	7.5/10
IGN	8.5/10
Next Generation	4/5
PlayStation Official Magazine – UK	8/10
Official U.S. PlayStation Magazine	4.5/5

The game received favorable reviews according to the review aggregation website GameRankings. Noah Massey of NextGen said of the game, "If you've ever dreamed about fighting in an epic space battle, then this is without a doubt the game for you." Many other reviewers gave it favorable reviews while the game was still in development.

The Freshman of GamePro said of the European import in one review, "While Red Sun isn't the technological breakthrough that the first CW was in its day, it's still a worthwhile time-sink for PSX space-jockeys." (Note: GamePro gave the game three 4/5 scores for graphics, sound, and fun factor, and 3.5/5 for control in one early review.) In another early GamePro review, however, Air Hendrix said, "Like Valdemar himself, you're better off renting Red Sun instead of signing on with a purchase. It's not a bad game, just a disappointing one. Plenty of gamers will work through its flaws and get addicted, but many others will move on to friendlier skies." (Note: GamePro gave the game 4/5 for graphics, two 3.5/5 scores for sound and fun factor, and 4.5/5 for control in another early review.)

The game was a runner-up for the "Shooter" award in both Editors' Choice and Readers' Choice at IGN's Best of 2000 Awards.
