= PlayStation controller =

Game controller for the PlayStation

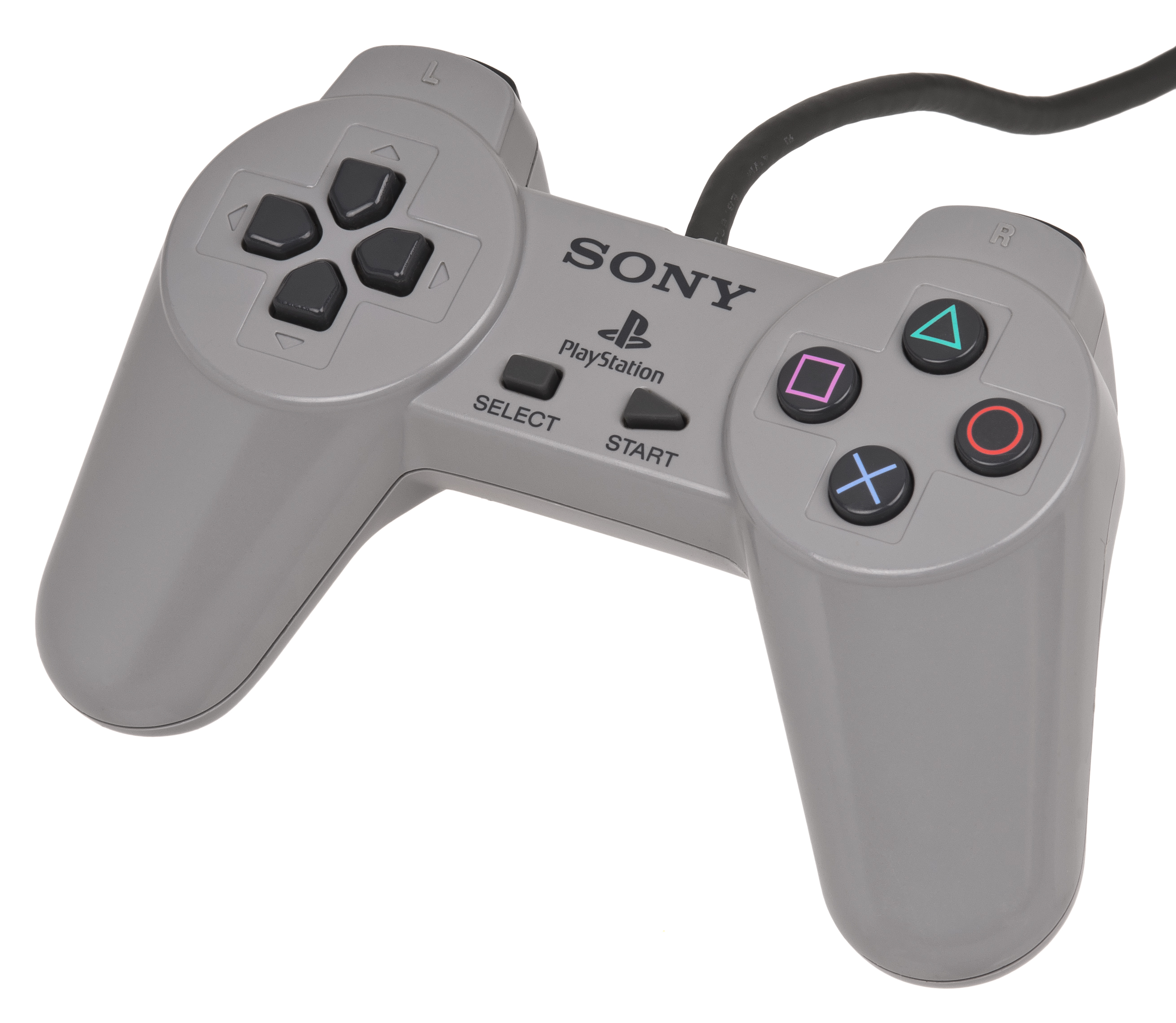
- Developer: Sony Computer Entertainment
- Manufacturer: Sony
- Type: Gamepad
- Generation: Fifth
- Released: JP: 3 December 1994; NA: 9 September 1995; EU: 29 September 1995; AU: 15 November 1995
- Discontinued: 1997
- Input: 10× digital buttons (Start, Select, L1, R1, L2, R2); Digital D-Pad
- Connectivity: PlayStation controller port
- Successor: Dual Analog Controller

The PlayStation controller (SCPH-1010 in Japan, SCPH-1080 overseas) is the first gamepad released by Sony Computer Entertainment for its PlayStation home video game console.

== Design ==
Based on the basic button configuration established with Nintendo's Super NES Controller, the PlayStation controller added a second pair of shoulder buttons for the middle fingers. Intending to update the gamepad for navigating 3D environments such as the ones PlayStation was designed to generate, the concept behind featuring shoulder buttons for both the index and middle fingers was to implement two-way directional depth controls using two sets of buttons. To compensate for the less stable grip from shifting the middle fingers' placement to the shoulders, grip handles were added to the controller.

Using the simple geometric shapes of a green triangle, a red circle, a blue cross, and a pink square to label its action buttons rather than traditionally used letters or numbers, the PlayStation controller established a trademark which would be incorporated heavily into the PlayStation brand. In an interview with Teiyu Goto, designer of the original PlayStation controller, he explained what the symbols mean: the circle and cross represent "yes" and "no", respectively (as common in Japanese culture, which explains their common use as "confirm" and "cancel" in most Japanese PlayStation games and are placed similarly to the A and B buttons on the Super NES controller, which had similar functions); the triangle symbolizes a point of view and the square is equated to a sheet of paper there to be used to access menus. In Western releases, the circle and cross functions are often reversed (circle to cancel, cross to confirm) or reassigned to a different button (cross to confirm, triangle to cancel).

The PlayStation 2 console is backwards-compatible with the original PlayStation controller as it uses the same connector and protocol as the original PlayStation console, due to the console's backward compatibility with original PlayStation peripherals. However, functionality is limited with many PS2 games due to its lack of analog sticks and pressure-sensitive buttons.

== History ==
Ken Kutaragi recounted the designing of the controller:

In development, we simulated every possible joypad situation. We imagined what it would be like to have to continually put the pad down while mapping a game, or playing while lying on the floor, and many other cases. After that we had to decide on the weight of the buttons and the pad itself. We adjusted the weights one gram at a time and eventually we found the correct balance. We probably spent as much time on the joypad's development as we did on the body of the machine.

Both Goto and Kutaragi recalled that Sony president Norio Ohga showed a special interest in the development of the controller, and strongly supported the final version. The original version (model SCPH-1010) was released alongside the PlayStation on 3 December 1994 in Japan.

When the PlayStation was launched in North America and Europe on the 9th and 29th of September 1995 respectively, the controller was slightly retooled to meet the needs of the western market, and came with a revised version of the PlayStation controller (model SCPH-1080) for their respective launch models in those regions. This version is 10% larger than the original version in Japan, presumably to account for the differences in hand size among eastern and western people. It has a longer cord with a ferrite bead, and was bundled with all subsequent PlayStation consoles afterwards. This iteration of the controller was later released in Japan on 2 April 1996.

After briefly selling the Dual Analog Controller in 1997, Sony began phasing out the PlayStation controller later that year with the introduction of the DualShock controller, which would become the new standard controller for the PlayStation from that point onwards. The first game to explicitly require the use of DualShock (and Dual Analog) controllers, Ape Escape, would not come out until two years after the DualShock's initial release.
