= Colony Wars =

1997 video game

- PAL cover art
- Developer: Psygnosis
- Publisher: Psygnosis
- Designer: Mike Ellis
- Programmer: Mike Anthony
- Artist: Lee Carus-Wescott
- Writers: Mike Ellis; Damon Fairclough
- Composer: Tim Wright
- Platform: PlayStation
- Release: NA: 4 November 1997; EU: 5 November 1997
- Genre: Space combat simulation
- Mode: Single-player

Colony Wars is a 1997 space combat simulation video game developed and published by Psygnosis for the PlayStation. Players complete space combat missions using preselected starfighters equipped with various weapons. The game features multiple paths of missions and outcomes, depending on the player's performance. It was followed by Colony Wars: Vengeance in 1998, and Colony Wars: Red Sun in 2000.

== Gameplay ==
Players fight in numerous space combat missions using one of seven pre-selected League of Free Worlds starfighters (although in one mission, the player gets to use one captured Navy fighter). The selection is due to the League High Command's decisions for efficiency in every given mission. Each starfighter carries a certain combination of energy weapons, missiles or torpedoes, and a number of units are equipped with nonlethal EMP cannons. The player can also use countermeasures to shake off inbound enemy missiles and/or use a grapple gun to capture targets of importance.

The stages are divided into several "Acts" with three missions each. Multiple paths and outcomes are available throughout the game, depending on the player's performance. Completing or failing missions does not always define the ultimate success or failure of the campaign, and certain missions are vital turning points which can dramatically affect the game's plot.

Players can view their combat records in the game. They can also access a database of planets and ships, with full voiceovers.

== Story ==
The Solar System is fully stripped of its natural resources by the fifth millennium. As a result, the Earth Empire sends out expeditionary sleeper ships to distant planets found to have abundant natural resources and harvests them. The discovery of hyperspace technology accelerates the Empire's interstellar expansion. As the colonies become more prosperous, the inhabitants become discontent as most of their mined resources are used to benefit Earth. A peaceful insurrection in the 47th century results in the Earth Empire's leader, the Tzar, personally leading the destruction of a rebellious planet. Stunned by the carnage, the other colonies band together as the League of Free Worlds, with a man known as the Father leading the fight.

The Empire's Colonial Navy sends a fleet to attack League forces in the Gallonigher system, but the League executes hit-and-run strikes as they fall back to the main capital planet, Bennay. When the Navy overextends its forces for the assault on Bennay, the League lures them into a trap inside a nearby asteroid belt, where the Navy strike fleet is destroyed.

The game picks up several months after the Battle of Bennay, when the player character signs up for combat duty with the League as it fully mobilizes for war. The player's first missions are set in the League's home star system of Gallonigher, where the League forces are fending off against the Navy's raid attacks.

If the player is successful on Gallonigher, the League manages to capture Gallonigher's battle platform, which upholds the warphole in between Draco and Gallonigher systems and successfully close it without wasting too much resources or forces while doing so. This offers them an opportunity to launch a surprise counterattack into Draco system, by using the same captured Gallonigher battle platform to open a warphole into the Draco system.

If the player is defeated on Gallonigher, with the failure to secure the Gallonigher battle platform, the League struggles defending the Gallonigher and takes so long time to secure the system, that the Navy has enough time to regroup its forces and leave the system to look elsewhere for its spoils. Their new target will be Diomedes system. The League is forced to split its struggling forces to prevent Navy from conquering Diomedes, which holds a great importance to the League, as it is one of the League's most loyal ally and a critical source of resources.

If the player loses any Act on Diomedes, the Earth Empire wins the war as the Navy manages to conquer Diomedes and eliminate last pockets of its resistance, before launching a full-scale invasion on Gallonigher. While the remains of the League are attempting to make a one last desperate escape from the Diomedes system back to Gallonigher, a warphole appears behind them from where the Tzar's personal Super Titan flagship "Tsunami" appears and wipes away the League's retreating forces bringing end to The League of Free Worlds and its rebellion.

If the player is successful on Diomedes, the League manages to fend off Navy's attacks, but is left badly damaged and demoralized. As a result, they decide to launch a counterattack on the Alpha Centauri system, where a civil war is raging in between League supporters and Earth Empire loyalists. It is also possible to be sent to Alpha Centauri by being defeated on Draco system. Instead of fighting against the Navy here (or at least most of the time), the League ends up fighting against the group known as "The Faction", which is a group formed by the former League participants who have grown discontent to the League and The Father and have decided to make an attempt to seize the entire control of the League to themselves. The Faction is fully supported by the Earth Empire.

If the player is successful on Alpha Centauri, the Earth Empire and the League forge a peace as they reach a tactical stalemate after the Faction is defeated. The Earth Empire could never concentrate its forces enough to finish the League off without invoking more similar rebellions on the systems where Empire's forces would leave, while the League could never truly defeat the Earth Empire by their meager resources. As a result: The League gains independence from the Earth Empire, but agrees to support the Earth Empire and the preservation of the Solar System as a tribute to its status as the mankind's birthplace.

If the player is defeated on Alpha Centauri, The Faction manages to seize the control of the League and makes peace with the Earth Empire by making a deal: In return for a chance to return to the League's home colonies and there declare a victory over the Earth Empire, The Faction would ensure that the old life of oppression and theft could continue unchecked and that the Earth Empire would gain all the resources it needs, until the colonies will have nothing left to give. The Faction executes most of the League participants, but a handful of them manage to escape.

If the player is defeated on Draco, the league are forced to flee into the Alpha Centauri.

If the player is successful on Draco, this gives the League an opportunity to launch attack on the Sol system

If player is defeated on Sol, the League is forced to retreat from Sol, but they seal the Sol warp hole as they leave by destroying the Sol battle platform, sealing the Solar System and effectively imprisoning the Earth Empire. Due to a lack of resources, a civil war breaks out throughout the Solar System and the Earth Empire collapses. Colony Wars: Vengeance, a sequel set 20–30 years later, continues the story from this ending.

Success in the Solar System requires that the player defeat the Tzar's personal Super Titan (a final boss). The League wins the war as the Earth Empire unconditionally surrenders and the Tzar is declared "gone and vanished". With the Earth Empire defeated, the people of Sol are no longer limited to leave the Solar System so many migrate to the other colonized worlds and star systems. Earth Empire's fall also results to the independence of all the colonized star systems and their worlds.

If the player gets this ending without failing any act or mission during the entire campaign, there will be an additional scene: A disc-shaped spaceship, flying above an unknown star.

== Development ==
In the original design, players could choose to fight for either the League or the Earth Empire. The development team decided to scrap this option in order to provide a larger mission base for the game. Recognizing that in other games with branching paths based around mission success or failure, players tended to simply retry a mission whenever they failed, the team attempted to conceal mission failure by having the mission-tree move the player on to the next branch without making a point of their defeat. According to Psygnosis product marketing manager Mark Day, Colony Wars and G-Police were "neck and neck" as far as getting the biggest financial push from the company.

The in-game soundtrack was written and produced by Tim Wright, who also composed music for the Wipeout series of games released by Psygnosis.

== Reception ==
Reception

Aggregate score
Aggregator	Score
Metacritic	91/100

Review scores
Publication	Score
Edge	6/10
Electronic Gaming Monthly	9.25/10
GameSpot	7.2/10
IGN	9.3/10
Next Generation	5/5

Colony Wars received critical acclaim. Reviewers lauded the game's graphics, mission branching system, controls (particularly with analog joypads), selection of weapons and craft, and the way the game achieved a feeling of actually being present in an epic space battle. IGN elaborated that "The game has an incredible sense of scale and space ... One minute you're flying your small attack fighter through a formation of giant (and I mean h-u-g-e) space cruisers, desperately trying to avoid the massive laser beams they're firing at you, and the next you're flying like a madman in the midst of a swarm of tiny enemy attack fighters trying to destroy them before they send you floating home in pieces." Electronic Gaming Monthly gave it their "Game of the Month" award, with Crispin Boyer calling it "a breathtaking epic" and Kraig Kujawa "top-notch in just about every way possible." Boyer also made Colony Wars his pick for "Sleeper Hit of the Holidays" several months before EGM reviewed the game, and in EGM's 1997 Editors' Choice Awards, it was a runner-up for "Best PlayStation Game of the Year" (behind Castlevania: Symphony of the Night), "Best Graphics" (behind Final Fantasy VII), and "Best Sound" (behind Oddworld: Abe's Oddysee). GamePro gave it a 4.5 out of 5 in control and sound and a perfect 5.0 in graphics and fun factor, saying it "easily ranks as the best space-combat game on the PlayStation."

Edge praised the game's graphics and presentation values, but criticized its superficial gameplay, stating that the game "proves little more than a 3D interpretation of Asteroids." GameSpot took the reverse position, saying that the storyline and general mission presentation are bland, but that the gameplay excels due to the intense situations which arise during combat. Next Generation stated, "A technological marvel, Colony Wars seems to redefine what is possible on PlayStation. The special effects used throughout are both eye-popping and superior to just about anything that has come before on any platform. Simply put, this game is not to be missed." EGM's Shawn Smith went so far as to say that the graphics were the best of any PlayStation game to date.

The game sold more than 150,000 copies in the United States of America.

== Sequels ==
Colony Wars was the first title in a series that included two sequels: Vengeance (1998) and Red Sun (2000). In 2010, UGO listed the series among its top 25 games most in need of sequels.

Star Trek: Invasion (2000) is a similar space combat simulator for the PlayStation developed by many of the same people that worked on the Colony Wars series.
