= PlayStation (console) =

Home video game console by Sony

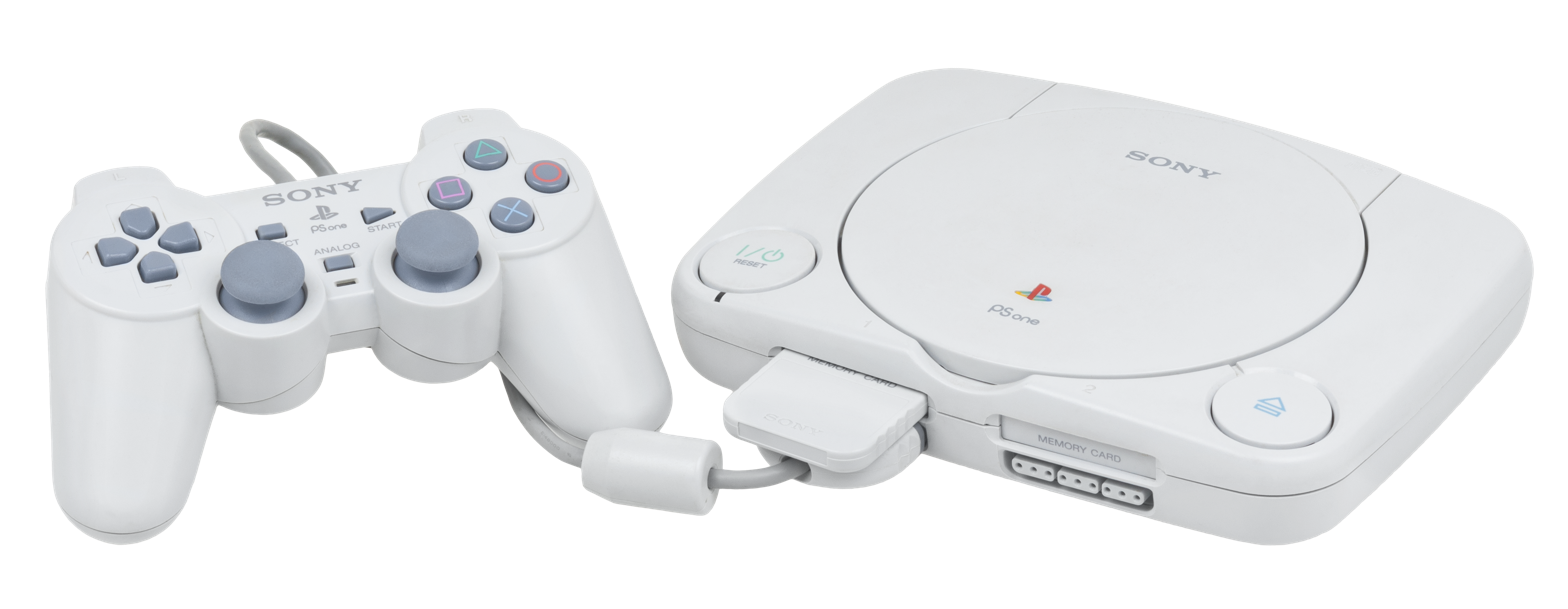
- Top: The initial PlayStation model (1994) with original controller and memory card Bottom: The redesigned PS one (2000) with DualShock controller and memory card
- Codename: PSX
- Also known as: PS; PS1; PS one (redesign)
- Developer: Sony Computer Entertainment
- Manufacturer: Sony Electronics
- Product family: PlayStation
- Type: Home video game console
- Generation: Fifth
- Released: 3 December 1994: PlayStation; JP: 3 December 1994; NA: 9 September 1995; EU: 29 September 1995; AU: 15 November 1995; ZA: November 1996; HK/SG/TH/MY: December 1996; TW: December 1997 PS One; JP: 7 July 2000; NA: 19 September 2000; EU: 29 September 2000; HK/SG/TH/MY/TW: November 2000; IND: 24 January 2002; KR: 22 February 2002
- Introductory price: ¥39,800 (equivalent to ¥44,990 in 2024); US$299 (equivalent to $630 in 2025); £299 (equivalent to £610 in 2025)
- Discontinued: 23 March 2006
- Units shipped: Worldwide: 102.49 million; North America: 40.78 million; Europe: 40.12 million; Asia: 21.59 million
- Media: CD
- CPU: R3000 @ 33.87 MHz
- Memory: 2 MB RAM, 1 MB Video RAM (2MB in SCPH-7501 and later)
- Storage: Memory card
- Display: 240p, 480i (NTSC); 288p, 576i (PAL)
- Sound: * Analog stereo; * PCM stereo (requires third-party Parallel I/O adapter) (SCPH-100x to 7000 only); * Dolby Pro Logic surround (select games)
- Controller input: PlayStation controller, PlayStation Analog Joystick, Dual Analog Controller, DualShock
- Connectivity: List: Audio/video output; AV Multi port (with stereo audio); Composite; S-Video; RGBS/SCART; RF modulator Other; PlayStation Link Cable via Serial I/O; Parallel I/O
- Online services: i-mode Mobile Phone Connection Cable (Japan only); Lightspan Online Connection CD (third-party)
- Best-selling game: Gran Turismo (10.85 million) (list)
- Successor: PlayStation 2

The PlayStation (Note: Japanese: プレイステーション, Hepburn: Pureisutēshon) (codenamed PSX, abbreviated as PS, and retronymically PS1 or PS one) is a home video game console developed and marketed by Sony Computer Entertainment. It was released in Japan on 3 December 1994, followed by North America on 9 September 1995, Europe on 29 September 1995, and other regions following thereafter. As a fifth-generation console, the PlayStation primarily competed with the Nintendo 64 and the Sega Saturn.

Sony began developing the PlayStation after a failed venture with Nintendo to create a CD-ROM peripheral for the Super Nintendo Entertainment System in the early 1990s. The console was primarily designed by Ken Kutaragi and Sony Computer Entertainment in Japan, while additional development was outsourced in the United Kingdom. An emphasis on 3D polygon graphics was placed at the forefront of the console's design. PlayStation game production was designed to be streamlined and inclusive, enticing the support of many third party developers.

The console proved popular for its extensive game library, popular franchises, low retail price, and aggressive youth marketing which advertised it as the preferable console for adolescents and adults. Critically acclaimed games that defined the console include Gran Turismo, Crash Bandicoot, Spyro the Dragon, Tomb Raider, Resident Evil, Metal Gear Solid, Tekken 3, Final Fantasy VII, and Silent Hill. Sony ceased production of the PlayStation on 23 March 2006—over eleven years after it had been released, and in the same year the PlayStation 3 debuted. More than 4,000 PlayStation games were released, with cumulative sales of 962 million units.

The PlayStation signaled Sony's rise to power in the video game industry. It received acclaim and sold strongly; in less than a decade, it became the first computer entertainment platform to ship over 100 million units. Its use of compact discs heralded the game industry's transition from cartridges. The PlayStation's success led to a line of successors, beginning with the PlayStation 2 in 2000. In the same year, Sony released a smaller and cheaper model, the PS one.

== History ==
=== Background ===
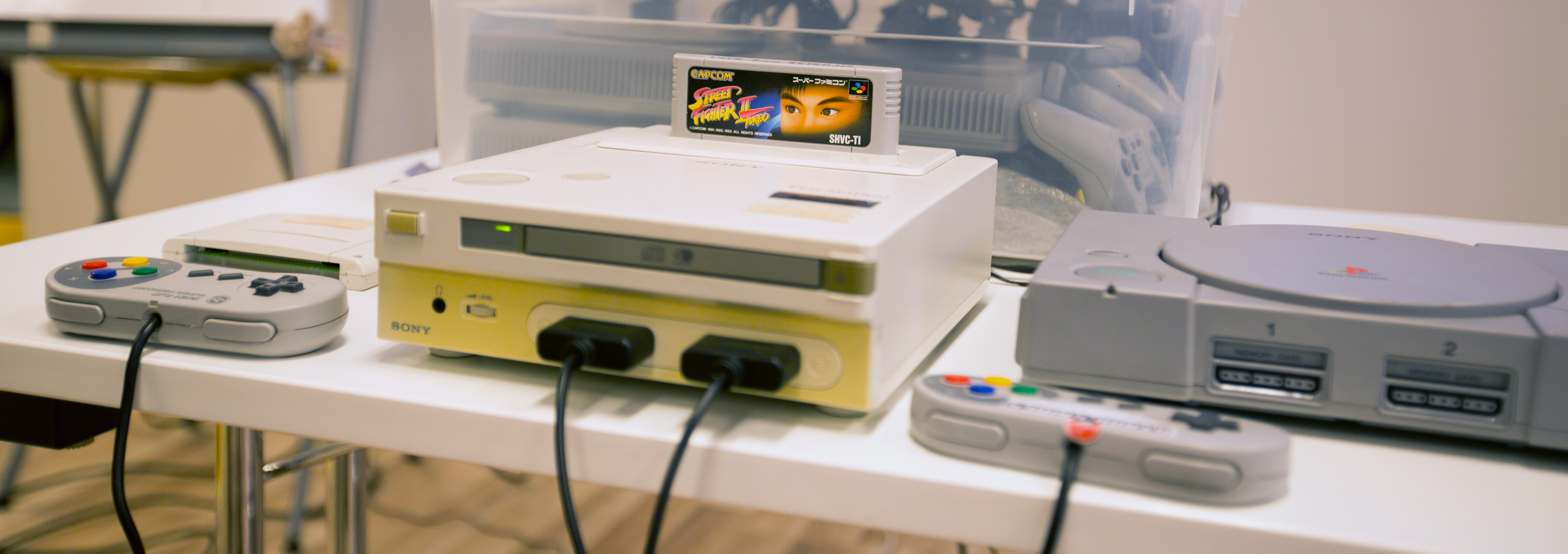
One of the only two known SNES-based PlayStation prototypes

The PlayStation was conceived by Ken Kutaragi, a Sony executive who managed a hardware engineering division and was later dubbed "the Father of the PlayStation". Kutaragi's interest in working with video games stemmed from seeing his daughter play games on Nintendo's Famicom. Kutaragi convinced Nintendo to use his SPC-700 sound processor in the Super Nintendo Entertainment System (SNES) through a demonstration of the processor's capabilities. His willingness to work with Nintendo was derived from both his admiration of the Famicom and conviction in video game consoles becoming the main home-use entertainment systems. Although Kutaragi was nearly fired because he worked with Nintendo without Sony's knowledge, president Norio Ohga recognised the potential in Kutaragi's chip and decided to keep him as a protégé.

The inception of the PlayStation dates back to a 1988 joint venture between Nintendo and Sony. Nintendo had produced floppy disk technology to complement cartridges in the form of the Family Computer Disk System, and wanted to continue this complementary storage strategy for the SNES. Since Sony was already contracted to produce the SPC-700 sound processor for the SNES, Nintendo contracted Sony to develop a CD-ROM add-on, tentatively titled the "Play Station" or "SNES-CD". The PlayStation name had already been trademarked by Yamaha, but Nobuyuki Idei liked it so much that he agreed to acquire it for an undisclosed sum rather than search for an alternative.

Sony was keen to obtain a foothold in the rapidly expanding video game market. Having been the primary manufacturer of the MSX home computer format, Sony had wanted to use their experience in consumer electronics to produce their own video game hardware. Although the initial agreement between Nintendo and Sony was about producing a CD-ROM drive add-on, Sony had also planned to develop a SNES-compatible Sony-branded console. This iteration was intended to be more of a home entertainment system, playing both SNES cartridges and a new CD format named the "Super Disc", which Sony would design. Under the agreement, Sony would retain sole international rights to every Super Disc game, giving them a large degree of control despite Nintendo's leading position in the video game market. Furthermore, Sony would also be the sole benefactor of licensing related to music and film software that it had been aggressively pursuing as a secondary application.

The Play Station was to be announced at the 1991 Consumer Electronics Show (CES) in Las Vegas. However, Nintendo president Hiroshi Yamauchi was wary of Sony's increasing leverage at this point and deemed the original 1988 contract unacceptable upon realising it essentially handed Sony control over all games written on the SNES CD-ROM format. Although Nintendo was dominant in the video game market, Sony possessed a superior research and development department. Wanting to protect Nintendo's existing licensing structure, Yamauchi cancelled all plans for the joint Nintendo–Sony SNES CD attachment without telling Sony. He sent Nintendo of America president Minoru Arakawa (his son-in-law) and chairman Howard Lincoln to Amsterdam to form a more favourable contract with Dutch conglomerate Philips, Sony's rival. This contract would give Nintendo total control over their licences on all Philips-produced machines.

Kutaragi and Nobuyuki Idei, Sony's director of public relations at the time, learned of Nintendo's actions two days before the CES was due to begin. Kutaragi telephoned numerous contacts, including Philips, to no avail. On the first day of the CES, Sony announced their partnership with Nintendo and their new console, the Play Station. At 9 am on the next day, in what has been called "the greatest ever betrayal" in the industry, Howard Lincoln stepped onto the stage and revealed that Nintendo was now allied with Philips and would abandon their work with Sony.

=== Inception ===
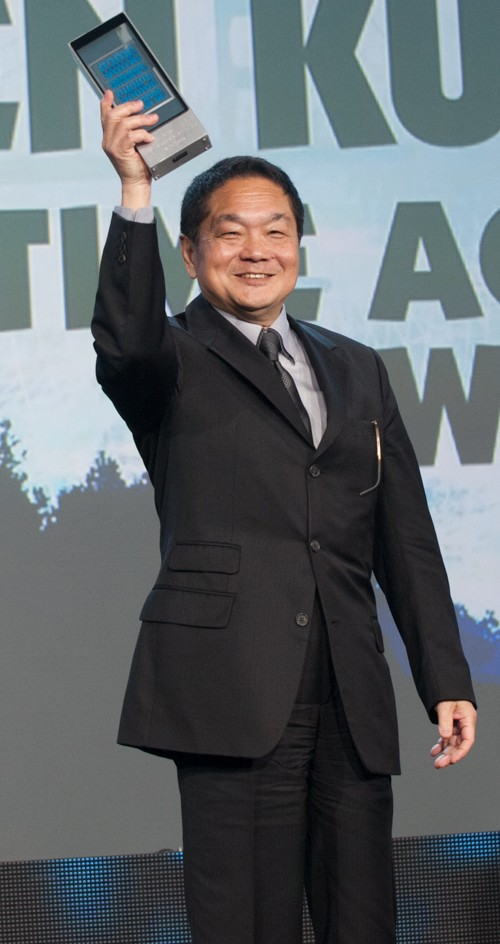
Ken Kutaragi, the "Father of the PlayStation", pictured at the Game Developers Choice Awards in 2014

Incensed by Nintendo's renouncement, Ohga and Kutaragi decided that Sony would develop their own console. Nintendo's contract-breaking was met with consternation in the Japanese business community, as they had broken an "unwritten law" of native companies not turning against each other in favour of foreign ones. Sony's American branch considered allying with Sega to produce a CD-ROM-based machine called the Sega Multimedia Entertainment System, but the Sega board of directors in Tokyo vetoed the idea when Sega of America CEO Tom Kalinske presented them the proposal. Kalinske recalled them saying: "That's a stupid idea, Sony doesn't know how to make hardware. They don't know how to make software either. Why would we want to do this?" Sony halted their research, but decided to develop what it had developed with Nintendo and Sega into a console based on the SNES.

Despite the tumultuous events at the 1991 CES, negotiations between Nintendo and Sony were still ongoing. A deal was proposed: the Play Station would still have a port for SNES games, on the condition that it would still use Kutaragi's audio chip and that Nintendo would own the rights and receive the bulk of the profits. Roughly two hundred prototype machines were created, and some software entered development. Many within Sony were still opposed to their involvement in the video game industry, with some resenting Kutaragi for jeopardising the company. Kutaragi remained adamant that Sony not retreat from the growing industry and that a deal with Nintendo would never work. Knowing that they had to take decisive action, Sony severed all ties with Nintendo on 4 May 1992.

To determine the fate of the PlayStation project, Ohga chaired a meeting in June 1992, consisting of Kutaragi and several senior Sony board members. Kutaragi unveiled a proprietary CD-ROM-based system he had been secretly working on which played games with immersive 3D graphics. Kutaragi was confident that his LSI chip could accommodate one million logic gates, which exceeded the capabilities of Sony's semiconductor division at the time. Despite gaining Ohga's enthusiasm, there remained opposition from a majority present at the meeting. Older Sony executives also opposed it, who saw Nintendo and Sega as "toy" manufacturers. The opposers felt the game industry was too culturally offbeat and asserted that Sony should remain a central player in the audiovisual industry, where companies were familiar with one another and could conduct "civilized" business negotiations. After Kutaragi reminded him of the humiliation he suffered from Nintendo, Ohga retained the project and became one of Kutaragi's most staunch supporters.

Ohga shifted Kutaragi and nine of his team from Sony's main headquarters to Sony Music Entertainment Japan (SMEJ), a subsidiary of the main Sony group, so as to retain the project and maintain relationships with Philips for the MMCD development project. The involvement of SMEJ proved crucial to the PlayStation's early development as the process of manufacturing games on CD-ROM format was similar to that used for audio CDs, with which Sony's music division had considerable experience. While at SMEJ, Kutaragi worked with Epic/Sony Records founder Shigeo Maruyama and Akira Sato; both later became vice-presidents of the division that ran the PlayStation business. Sony Computer Entertainment (SCE) was jointly established by Sony and SMEJ to handle the company's ventures into the video game industry. On 27 October 1993, Sony publicly announced that it was entering the game console market with the PlayStation. According to Maruyama, there was uncertainty over whether the console should primarily focus on 2D, sprite-based graphics or 3D polygon graphics. After Sony witnessed the success of Sega's Virtua Fighter (1993) in Japanese arcades, the direction of the PlayStation became "instantly clear" and 3D polygon graphics became the console's primary focus. SCE president Teruhisa Tokunaka expressed gratitude for Sega's timely release of Virtua Fighter as it proved "just at the right time" that making games with 3D imagery was possible. Maruyama claimed that Sony further wanted to emphasise the new console's ability to utilise redbook audio from the CD-ROM format in its games alongside high quality visuals and gameplay.

Wishing to distance the project from the failed enterprise with Nintendo, Sony initially branded the PlayStation the "PlayStation X" (PSX). Sony formed their North American division and European division, known as Sony Computer Entertainment America (originally Sony Computer Entertainment of America) (SCEA) and Sony Computer Entertainment Europe (SCEE), in May 1994 and January 1995, both units were originally divisions of Sony Electronic Publishing, the Western counterpart to Sony Music Entertainment Japan. The divisions planned to market the new console under the alternative branding "PSX" following the negative feedback regarding "PlayStation" in focus group studies. Early advertising prior to the console's launch in North America referenced PSX, but the term was scrapped before launch. The console was not marketed with Sony's name in contrast to Nintendo's consoles. According to Phil Harrison, much of Sony's upper management feared that the Sony brand would be tarnished if associated with the console, which they considered a "toy".

=== Development ===
Ian Hetherington pictured in 1990. Hetherington and Psygnosis played important roles in the PlayStation project.

Since Sony had no experience in game development, it had to rely on the support of third-party game developers. This was in contrast to Sega and Nintendo, which had versatile and well-equipped in-house software divisions for their arcade games and could easily port successful games to their home consoles. Recent consoles like the Atari Jaguar and 3DO suffered low sales due to a lack of developer support, prompting Sony to redouble their efforts in gaining the endorsement of arcade-savvy developers. A team from Epic Sony visited more than a hundred companies throughout Japan in May 1993 in hopes of attracting game creators with the PlayStation's technological appeal. Sony found that many disliked Nintendo's practices, such as favouring their own games over others. Through a series of negotiations, Sony acquired initial support from Namco, Konami, and Williams Entertainment, as well as 250 other development teams in Japan alone. Namco in particular was interested in developing for PlayStation since Namco rivalled Sega in the arcade market. Attaining these companies secured influential games such as Ridge Racer (1993) and Mortal Kombat 3 (1995), Ridge Racer being one of the most popular arcade games at the time, and it was already confirmed behind closed doors that it would be the PlayStation's first game by December 1993, despite Namco being a longstanding Nintendo developer. Namco's research managing director Shegeichi Nakamura met with Kutaragi in 1993 to discuss the preliminary PlayStation specifications, with Namco subsequently basing the Namco System 11 arcade board on PlayStation hardware and developing Tekken to compete with Virtua Fighter. The System 11 launched in arcades several months before the PlayStation's release, with the arcade release of Tekken in September 1994.

Despite securing the support of various Japanese studios, Sony had no developers of their own by the time the PlayStation was in development. This changed in 1993 when Sony acquired the Liverpudlian company Psygnosis (later renamed SCE Liverpool) for US$48 million, securing their first in-house development team. The acquisition meant that Sony could have more launch games ready for the PlayStation's release in Europe and North America. Ian Hetherington, Psygnosis' co-founder, was disappointed after receiving early builds of the PlayStation and recalled that the console "was not fit for purpose" until his team got involved with it. Hetherington frequently clashed with Sony executives over broader ideas; at one point it was suggested that a television with a built-in PlayStation be produced. In the months leading up to the PlayStation's launch, Psygnosis had around 500 full-time staff working on games and assisting with software development.

The purchase of Psygnosis marked another turning point for the PlayStation as it played a vital role in creating the console's development kits. While Sony had provided MIPS R4000-based Sony NEWS workstations for PlayStation development, Psygnosis employees disliked the thought of developing on these expensive workstations and asked Bristol-based SN Systems to create an alternative PC-based development system. Andy Beveridge and Martin Day, owners of SN Systems, had previously supplied development hardware for other consoles such as the Mega Drive, Atari ST, and the SNES. When Psygnosis arranged an audience for SN Systems with Sony's Japanese executives at the January 1994 CES in Las Vegas, Beveridge and Day presented their prototype of the condensed development kit, which could run on an ordinary personal computer with two extension boards. Impressed, Sony decided to abandon their plans for a workstation-based development system in favour of SN Systems's, thus securing a cheaper and more efficient method for designing software. An order of over 600 systems followed, and SN Systems supplied Sony with additional software such as an assembler, linker, and a debugger. SN Systems produced development kits for future PlayStation systems, including the PlayStation 2 and was bought out by Sony in 2005.

Sony strived to make game production as streamlined and inclusive as possible, in contrast to the relatively isolated approach of Sega and Nintendo. Phil Harrison, representative director of SCEE, believed that Sony's emphasis on developer assistance reduced most time-consuming aspects of development. As well as providing programming libraries, SCE headquarters in London, California, and Tokyo housed technical support teams that could work closely with third-party developers if needed. Sony did not favour their own over non-Sony products, unlike Nintendo; Peter Molyneux of Bullfrog Productions admired Sony's open-handed approach to software developers and lauded their decision to use PCs as a development platform, remarking that "[it was] like being released from jail in terms of the freedom you have". Another strategy that helped attract software developers was the PlayStation's use of the CD-ROM format instead of traditional cartridges. Nintendo cartridges were expensive to manufacture, and the company controlled all production, prioritising their own games, while inexpensive compact disc manufacturing occurred at dozens of locations around the world.

The PlayStation's architecture and interconnectability with PCs was beneficial to many software developers. The use of the programming language C proved useful, as it safeguarded future compatibility of the machine should developers decide to make further hardware revisions. Despite the inherent flexibility, some developers found themselves restricted due to the console's lack of RAM. While working on beta builds of the PlayStation, Molyneux observed that its MIPS processor was not "quite as bullish" compared to that of a fast PC and said that it took his team two weeks to port their PC code to the PlayStation development kits and another fortnight to achieve a four-fold speed increase. An engineer from Ocean Software, one of Europe's largest game developers at the time, thought that allocating RAM was a challenging aspect given the 3.5 megabyte restriction. Kutaragi said that while it would have been easy to double the amount of RAM for the PlayStation, the development team refrained from doing so to keep the retail cost down. Kutaragi saw the biggest challenge in developing the system to be balancing the conflicting goals of high performance, low cost, and being easy to program for, and felt he and his team were successful in this regard.

Its technical specifications were finalised in 1993 and its design during 1994. The PlayStation name and its final design were confirmed during a press conference on May 10, 1994, although the price and release dates had not been disclosed yet.

=== Launch ===
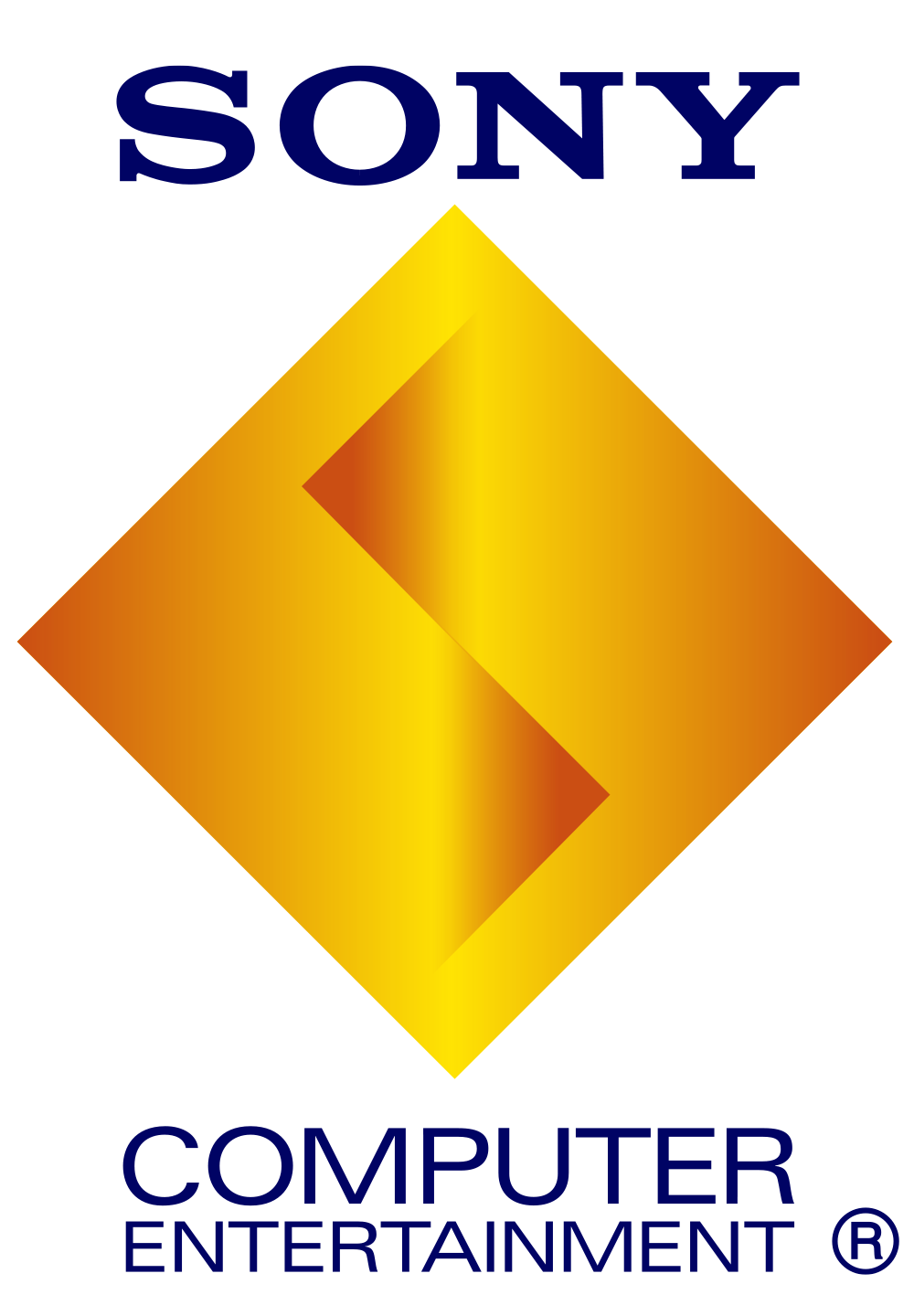
Sony Computer Entertainment logo used on PlayStation startup screen

Sony released the PlayStation in Japan on 3 December 1994, a week after the release of the Sega Saturn, at a price of ¥39,800. Sales in Japan began with a "stunning" success with long queues in shops. Ohga later recalled that he realised how important PlayStation had become for Sony when friends and relatives begged for consoles for their children. PlayStation sold 100,000 units on the first day and two million units within six months, although the Saturn outsold the PlayStation in the first few weeks due to the success of Virtua Fighter. By the end of 1994, 300,000 PlayStation units were sold in Japan compared to 500,000 Saturn units. A gray market emerged for PlayStations shipped from Japan to North America and Europe, with buyers of such consoles paying up to £700.

"When September 1995 arrived and Sony's Play[S]tation roared out of the gate, things immediately felt different than [sic] they did with the Saturn launch earlier that year. Sega dropped the Saturn $100 to match the Play[S]tation's $299 debut price, but sales weren't even close—Play[S]tations flew out the door as fast as we could get them in stock.

— Lee Hutchinson of Ars Technica, a Babbage's employee in 1995, recalling how PlayStation preorders greatly outnumbered Saturn sales at his shop.

Before the release in North America, Sega and Sony presented their consoles at the first Electronic Entertainment Expo (E3) in Los Angeles on 11 May 1995. At their keynote presentation, Sega of America CEO Tom Kalinske revealed that their Saturn console would be released immediately to select retailers at a price of $399. Next came Sony's turn: Olaf Olafsson, the head of SCEA, summoned Steve Race, the head of development, to the conference stage, who only said "Two ninety-nine." (as in $299) and left the audience with a round of applause. The attention to the Sony conference was further bolstered by the surprise appearance of Michael Jackson and the showcase of highly anticipated games, including Wipeout (1995), Ridge Racer and Tekken (1994). In addition, Sony announced that no games would be bundled with the console.

Although the Saturn had released early in the United States to gain an advantage over the PlayStation, the surprise launch upset many retailers who were not informed in time, harming sales. Some retailers such as KB Toys responded by dropping the Saturn entirely. The PlayStation went on sale in North America on 9 September 1995. It sold more units within two days than the Saturn had in five months, with almost all of the initial shipment of 100,000 units sold in advance and shops across the country running out of consoles and accessories. The well-received Ridge Racer contributed to the PlayStation's early success, — with some critics considering it superior to Sega's arcade counterpart Daytona USA (1994) — as did Battle Arena Toshinden (1995). There were over 100,000 pre-orders placed and 17 games available on the market by the time of the PlayStation's American launch, in comparison to the Saturn's six launch games.

The PlayStation released in Europe on 29 September 1995 and in Australia on 15 November 1995. By November it had already outsold the Saturn by three to one in the United Kingdom, where Sony had allocated a £20 million marketing budget during the Christmas season compared to Sega's £4 million. Sony found early success in the United Kingdom by securing listings with independent shop owners as well as prominent High Street chains such as Comet and Argos. Within its first year, the PlayStation secured over 20% of the entire American video game market. From September to the end of 1995, sales in the United States amounted to 800,000 units, giving the PlayStation a commanding lead over the other fifth-generation consoles, (Note: Technically, there is one exception to this. The 3DO Interactive Multiplayer, though consistently outsold by the PlayStation during this period, had more cumulative sales at the end of 1995, chiefly due to its having been on the market for nearly two years longer than the PlayStation.) though the SNES and Mega Drive from the fourth generation still outsold it. Sony reported that the attach rate of sold games and consoles was four to one. To meet increasing demand, Sony chartered jumbo jets and ramped up production in Europe and North America. By early 1996, the PlayStation had grossed $2 billion (equivalent to $4.106 billion 2025) from worldwide hardware and software sales. By late 1996, sales in Europe totalled 2.2 million units, including 700,000 in the UK. Approximately 400 PlayStation games were in development, compared to around 200 games being developed for the Saturn and 60 for the Nintendo 64.

In India, the PlayStation was launched in test market during 1999–2000 across Sony showrooms, selling 100 units. Sony finally launched the console (PS One model) countrywide on 24 January 2002 with the price of Rs 7,990 and 26 games available from start.

PlayStation was also doing well in markets where it was never officially released. For example, in Brazil, due to the registration of the trademark by a third company, the console could not be released, which was why the market was taken over by the officially distributed Sega Saturn during the first period, but as the Sega console withdrew, PlayStation imports and large piracy increased. In another market, China, the most popular 32-bit console was Sega Saturn, but after leaving the market, PlayStation grown with a base of 300,000 users until January 2000, although Sony China did not have plans to release it.

=== Marketing success and later years ===
The PlayStation was backed by a successful marketing campaign, allowing Sony to gain an early foothold in Europe and North America. Initially, PlayStation demographics were skewed towards adults, but the audience broadened after the first price drop. While the Saturn was positioned towards 18- to 34-year-olds, the PlayStation was initially marketed exclusively towards teenagers. Executives from both Sony and Sega reasoned that because younger players typically looked up to older, more experienced players, advertising targeted at teens and adults would draw them in too. Additionally, Sony found that adults reacted best to advertising aimed at teenagers; Lee Clow surmised that people who started to grow into adulthood regressed and became "17 again" when they played video games. The console was marketed with advertising slogans stylised as "LIVE IN YUR WRLD. PLY IN URS" (Live in Your World. Play in Ours.) and "U R NOT E" (red E; "You Are Not Ready"). The four geometric shapes were derived from the symbols for the four buttons on the controller. Clow thought that by invoking such provocative statements, gamers would respond to the contrary and say "'Bullshit. Let me show you how ready I am.'" As the console's appeal enlarged, Sony's marketing efforts broadened from their earlier focus on mature players to specifically target younger children as well.

Shortly after the PlayStation's release in Europe, Sony tasked marketing manager Geoff Glendenning with assessing the desires of a new target audience. Sceptical over Nintendo and Sega's reliance on television campaigns, Glendenning theorised that young adults transitioning from fourth-generation consoles would feel neglected by marketing directed at children and teenagers. Recognising the influence early 1990s underground clubbing and rave culture had on young people, especially in the United Kingdom, Glendenning felt that the culture had become mainstream enough to help cultivate PlayStation's emerging identity. Sony partnered with prominent nightclub owners such as Ministry of Sound and festival promoters to organise dedicated PlayStation areas where demonstrations of select games could be tested. Sheffield-based graphic design studio The Designers Republic was contracted by Sony to produce promotional materials aimed at a fashionable, club-going audience. Psygnosis' Wipeout in particular became associated with nightclub culture as it was widely featured in venues. By 1997, there were 52 nightclubs in the United Kingdom with dedicated PlayStation rooms. Glendenning recalled that he had discreetly used at least £100,000 a year in slush fund money to invest in impromptu marketing.

In 1996, Sony expanded their CD production facilities in the United States due to the high demand for PlayStation games, increasing their monthly output from 4 million discs to 6.5 million discs. This was necessary because PlayStation sales were running at twice the rate of Saturn sales, and its lead dramatically increased when both consoles dropped in price to $199 that year. The PlayStation also outsold the Saturn at a similar ratio in Europe during 1996, with 2.2 million consoles sold in the region by the end of the year. Sales figures for PlayStation hardware and software only increased following the launch of the Nintendo 64. Tokunaka speculated that the Nintendo 64 launch had actually helped PlayStation sales by raising public awareness of the gaming market through Nintendo's added marketing efforts. Despite this, the PlayStation took longer to achieve dominance in Japan. Tokunaka said that, even after the PlayStation and Saturn had been on the market for nearly two years, the competition between them was still "very close", and neither console had led in sales for any meaningful length of time. In the height of the success, Sony absorbed Sony Interactive Entertainment (formerly Sony Electronic Publishing), who owned SCEA and SCEE into Sony Computer Entertainment on January 6, 1997. The SIE name was reused when Sony Computer Entertainment was renamed to the current Sony Interactive Entertainment on April 1, 2016, 19 years after the old SIE was defunct.

By 1998, Sega, encouraged by their declining market share and significant financial losses, launched the Dreamcast as a last-ditch attempt to stay in the industry. Although its launch was successful, the technically superior 128-bit console was unable to subdue Sony's dominance in the industry. Sony still held 60% of the overall video game market share in North America at the end of 1999. Sega's initial confidence in their new console was undermined when Japanese sales were lower than expected, with disgruntled Japanese consumers reportedly returning their Dreamcasts in exchange for PlayStation software. On 2 March 1999, Sony officially revealed details of the PlayStation 2, which Kutaragi announced would feature a graphics processor designed to push more raw polygons than any console in history, effectively rivalling most supercomputers. The PlayStation continued to sell strongly at the turn of the new millennium: in June 2000, Sony released the PSOne, a smaller, redesigned variant which went on to outsell all other consoles in that year, including the PlayStation 2. In 2005, PlayStation became the first console to ship 100 million units with the PlayStation 2 later achieving this faster than its predecessor. The combined successes of both PlayStation consoles led to Sega retiring the Dreamcast in 2001, and abandoning the console business entirely. The PlayStation was eventually discontinued on 23 March 2006—over eleven years after its release, and less than a year before the debut of the PlayStation 3.

== Hardware ==
=== Technical specifications ===
GPU	PlayStation sound processor	R3000 CPU
The GPU (SCPH-9000 version)	PlayStation Custom Sound Processor	R3000 CPU
digital signal processor	SCPH-100 motherboard	PS One motherboard
Digital Signal Processor	An early SCPH-1000 motherboard	A PS One motherboard

The main microprocessor is a R3000 CPU made by LSI Logic operating at a clock rate of 33.8688 MHz and 30 MIPS. This 32-bit CPU relies heavily on the "cop2" 3D and matrix math coprocessor on the same die to provide the necessary speed to render complex 3D graphics. The role of the separate GPU chip is to draw 2D polygons and apply shading and textures to them: the rasterisation stage of the graphics pipeline. Sony's 16-bit custom sound chip supports ADPCM sources with up to 24 sound channels and offers a sampling rate of up to 44.1 kHz and music sequencing. It features 2 MB of main RAM, with an additional 1 MB of video RAM. The PlayStation has a maximum colour depth of 16.7 million true colours with 32 levels of transparency and unlimited colour look-up tables. The PlayStation can output composite, S-Video or RGB video signals through its AV Multi connector (with older models also having RCA connectors for composite), displaying resolutions from 256×224 to 640×480 pixels. Different games can use different resolutions. Earlier models also had proprietary parallel and serial ports that could be used to connect accessories or multiple consoles together; these were later removed due to a lack of usage.

The PlayStation uses a proprietary video compression unit, MDEC, which is integrated into the CPU and allows for the presentation of full motion video at a higher quality than other consoles of its generation. Unusual for the time, the PlayStation lacks a dedicated 2D graphics processor; 2D elements are instead calculated as polygons by the Geometry Transfer Engine (GTE) so that they can be processed and displayed on screen by the GPU. While running, the GPU can also generate a total of 4,000 sprites and 180,000 polygons per second, in addition to 360,000 per second flat-shaded.

=== Models ===
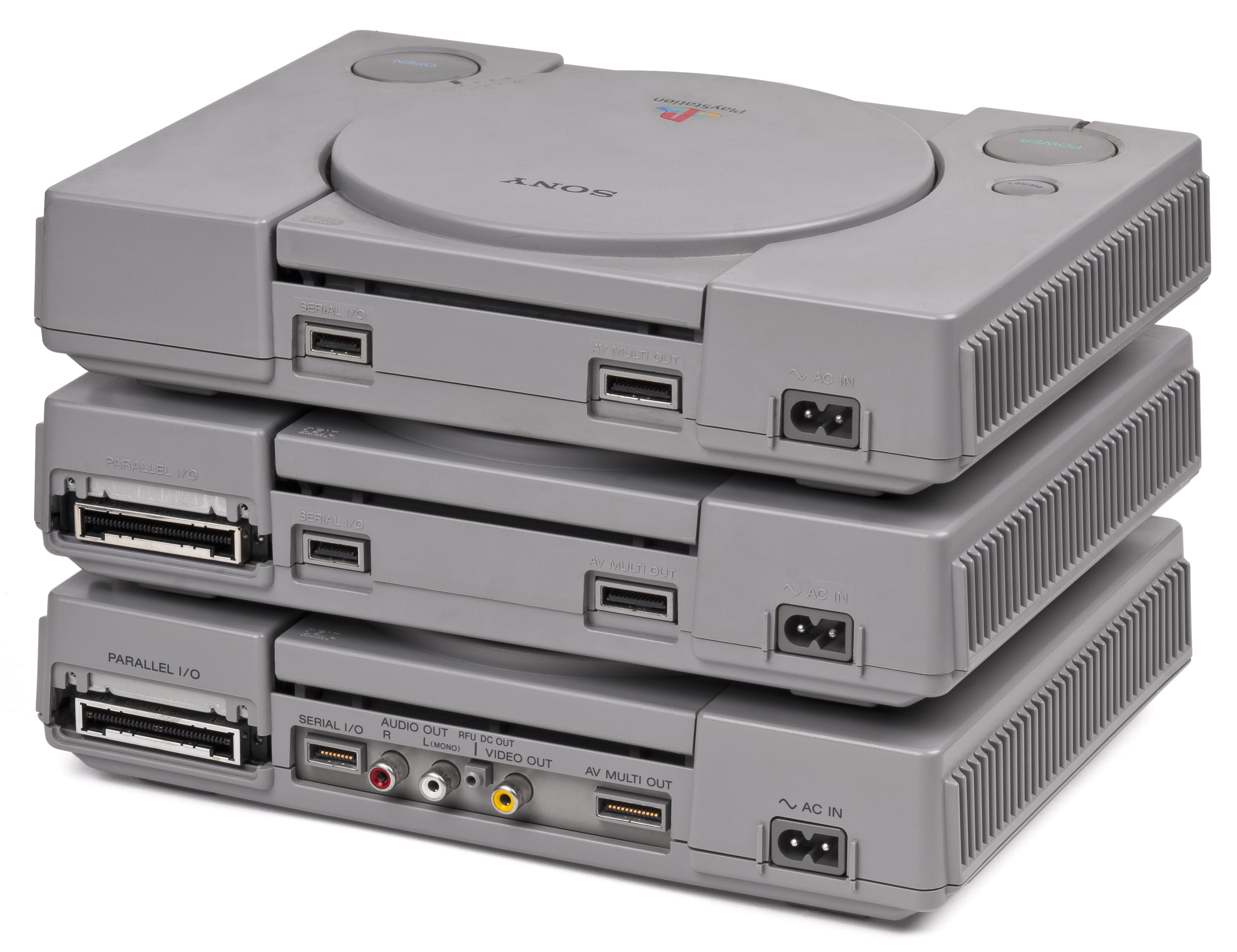
Three different Sony PlayStation model backs, showing the evolution of port reduction. From bottom to top, SCPH-1001, SCPH-5001 and SCPH-9001.

The PlayStation went through a number of variants during its production run. Externally, the most notable change was the gradual reduction in the number of external connectors from the rear of the unit. This started with the original Japanese launch units; the SCPH-1000, released on 3 December 1994, was the only model that had an S-Video port, as it was removed from the next model. Subsequent models saw a reduction in number of parallel ports, with the final version only retaining one serial port.

Sony marketed a development kit for amateur developers known as the Net Yaroze (meaning "Let's do it together" in Japanese). It was launched in June 1996 in Japan, and following public interest, was released the next year in other countries. The Net Yaroze allowed hobbyists to create their own games and upload them via an online forum run by Sony. The console was only available to buy through an ordering service and with the necessary documentation and software to program PlayStation games and applications through C programming compilers.

==== PS One ====
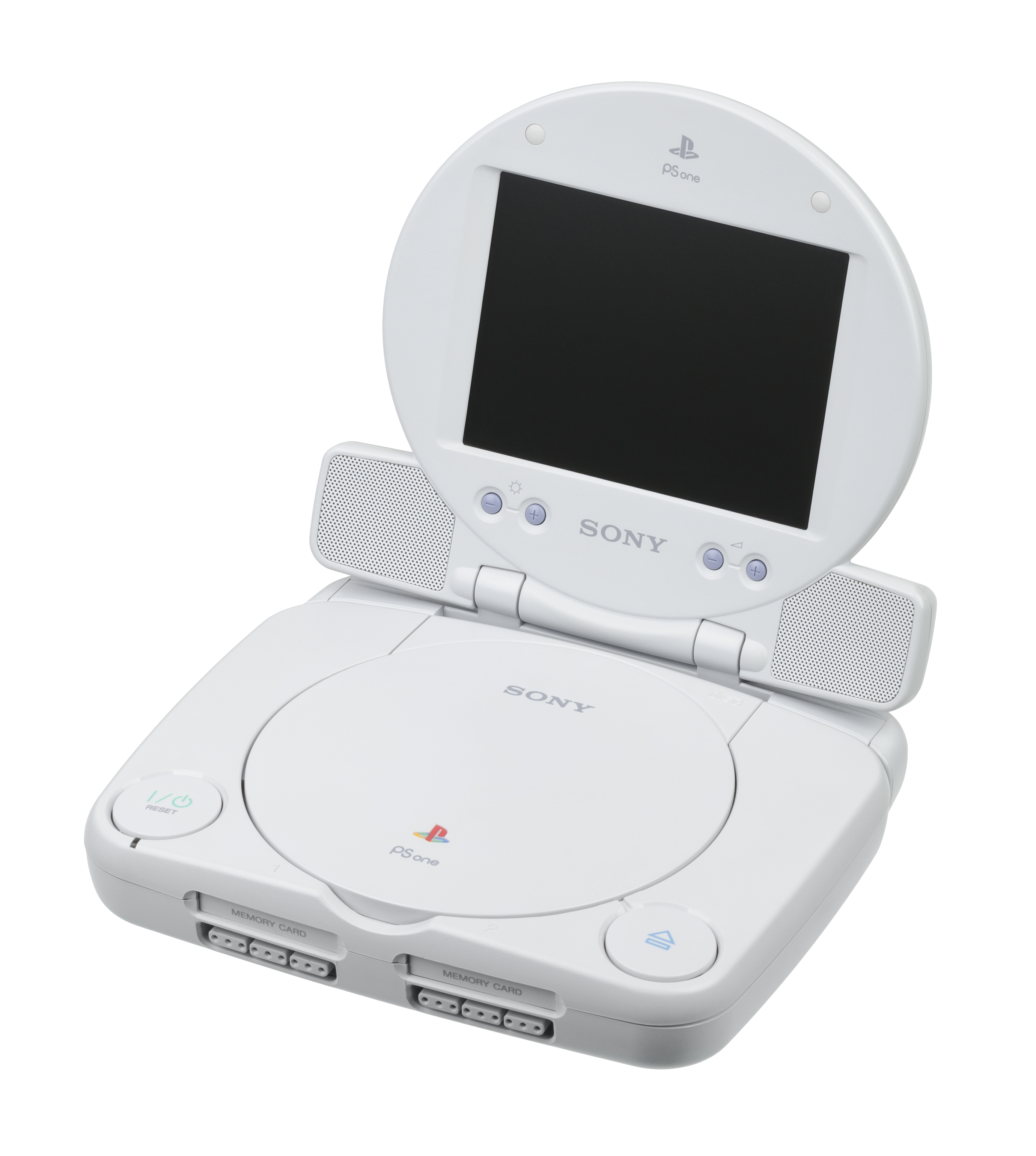
The PS One "combo pack" with 5-inch LCD screen attachment

On 7 July 2000, Sony released the PS One (stylised as "PS one" or "PSone"), a smaller, redesigned version of the original PlayStation. It was the highest-selling console through the end of the year, outselling all other consoles—including the PlayStation 2. In 2002, Sony released a 5-inch (130 mm) LCD screen add-on for the PS One, referred to as the "Combo pack". It also included a car cigarette lighter adaptor adding an extra layer of portability. Production of the LCD "Combo Pack" ceased in 2004, when the popularity of the PlayStation began to wane in markets outside Japan. A total of 28.15 million PS One units had been sold by the time it was discontinued in March 2006.

=== Controllers ===
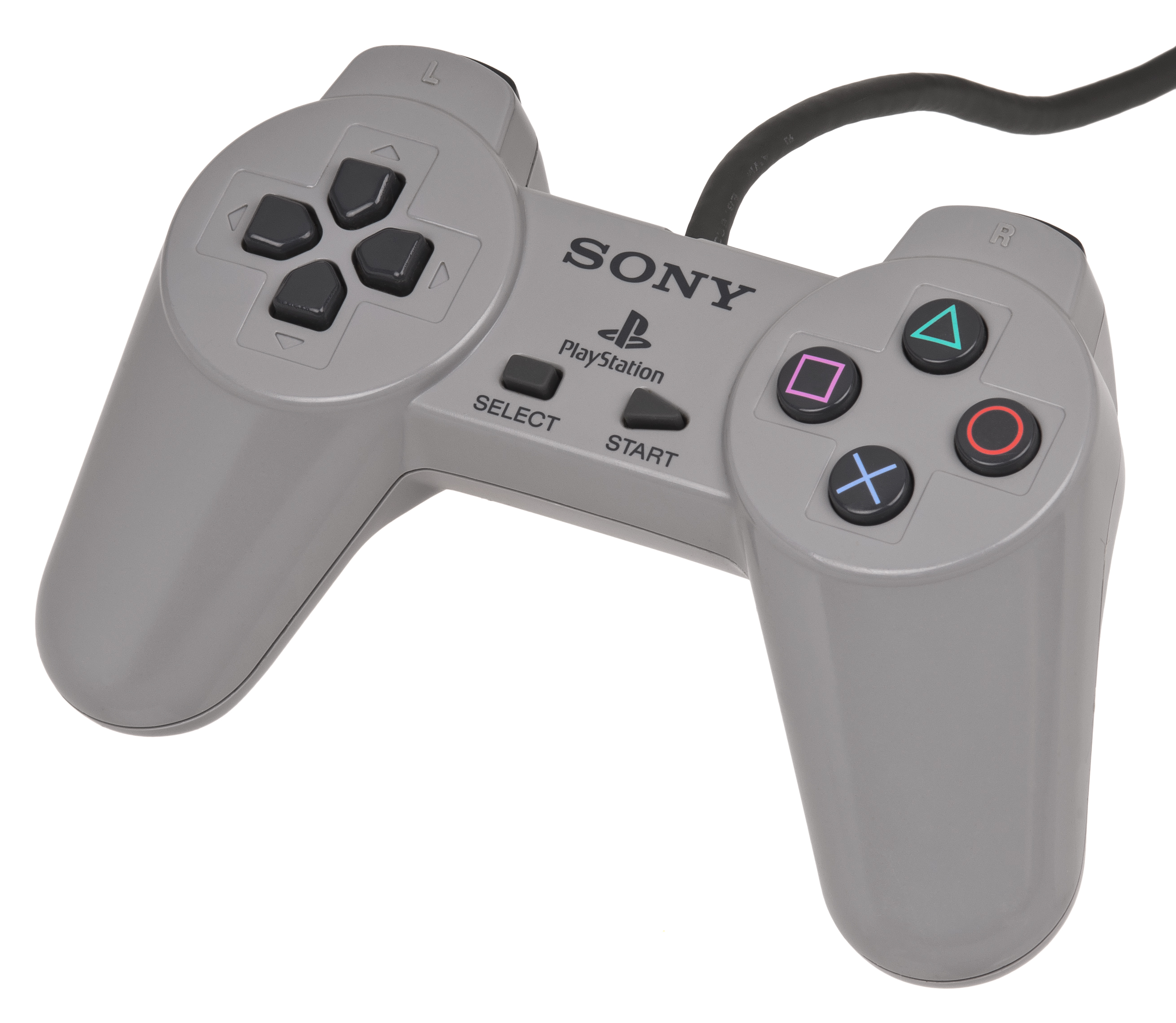
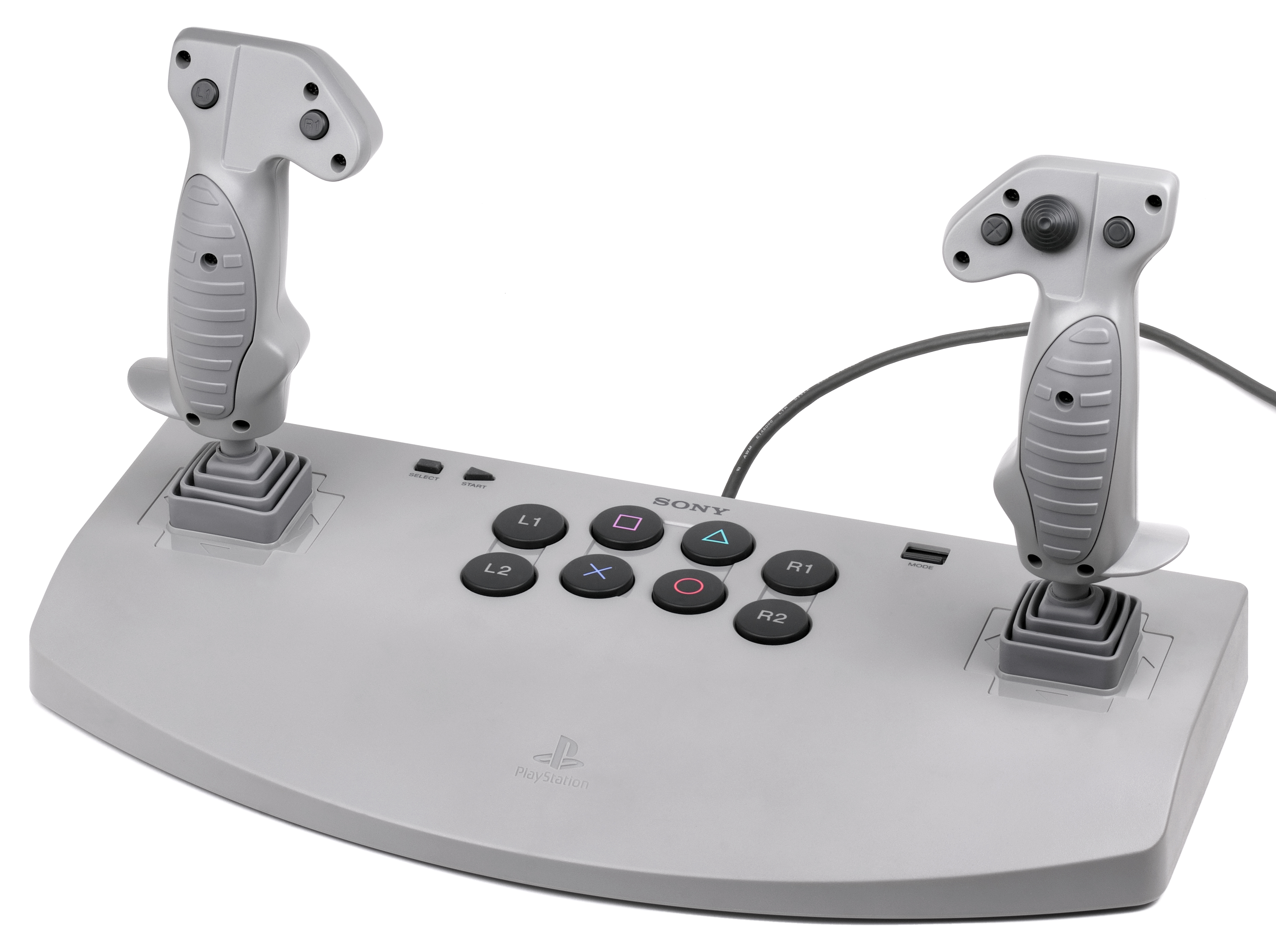
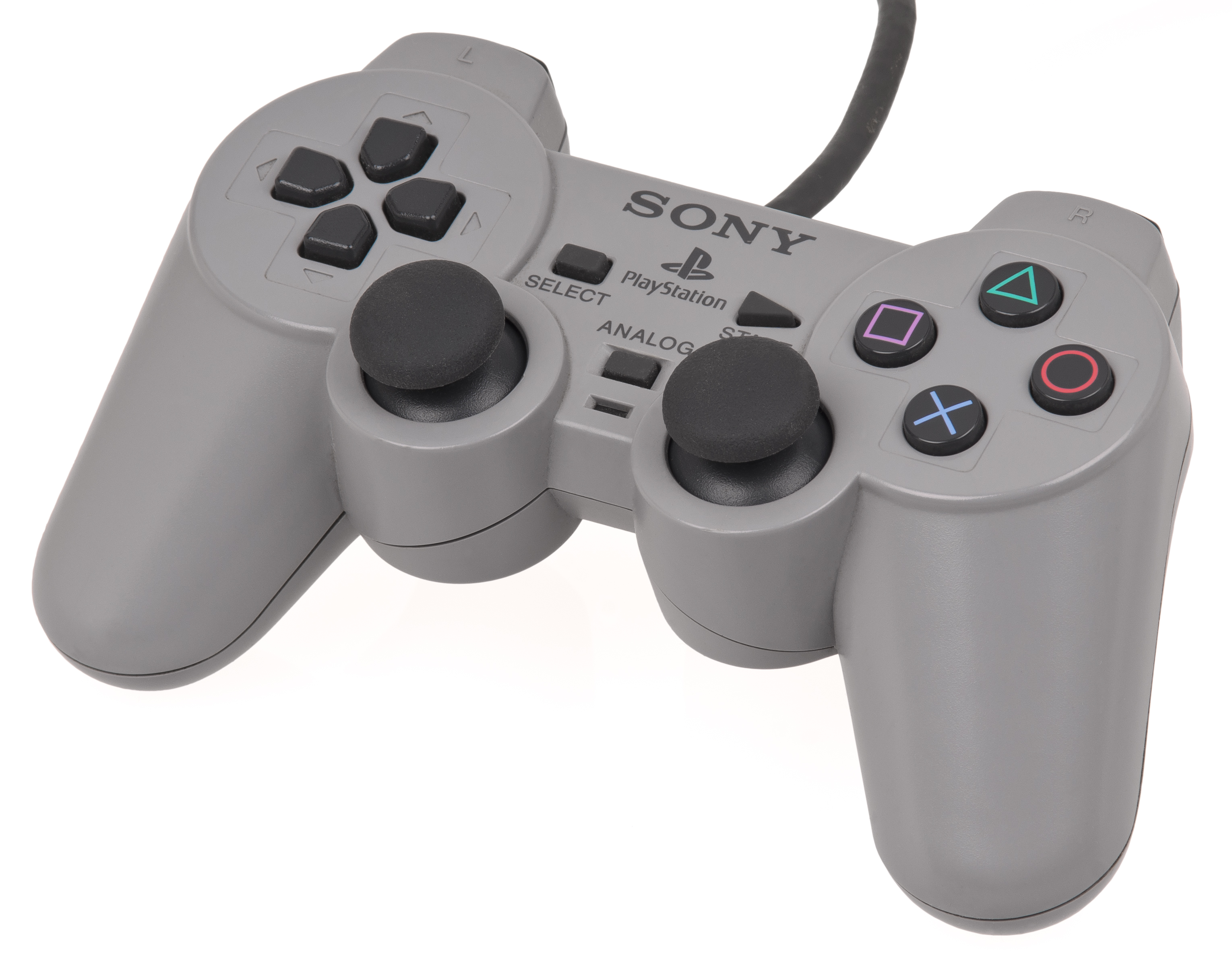
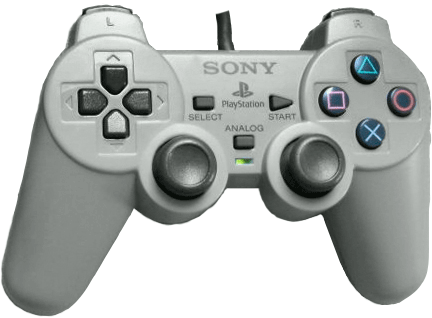
Clockwise from top left: an original PlayStation controller, PlayStation Analog Joystick, Dual Analog, and the DualShock

Three iterations of the PlayStation's controller were released over the console's lifespan. The first controller, the PlayStation controller, was released alongside the PlayStation in December 1994. It features four individual directional buttons (as opposed to a conventional D-pad), a pair of shoulder buttons on both sides, Start and Select buttons in the centre, and four face buttons consisting of simple geometric shapes: a green triangle, red circle, blue cross, and a pink square. Rather than depicting traditionally used letters or numbers onto its buttons, the PlayStation controller established a trademark which would be incorporated heavily into the PlayStation brand. Teiyu Goto, the designer of the original PlayStation controller, said that the circle and cross represent "yes" and "no", respectively (though this layout is reversed in Western versions); the triangle symbolises a point of view and the square is equated to a sheet of paper to be used to access menus. The European and North American models of the original PlayStation controllers are roughly 10% larger than its Japanese variant, to account for the fact the average person in those regions has larger hands than the average Japanese person.

Sony's first analogue gamepad, the PlayStation Analog Joystick (often erroneously referred to as the "Sony Flightstick"), was first released in Japan in April 1996. Featuring two parallel joysticks, it uses potentiometer technology previously used on consoles such as the Vectrex; instead of relying on binary eight-way switches, the controller detects minute angular changes through the entire range of motion. The stick also features a thumb-operated digital hat switch on the right joystick, corresponding to the traditional D-pad, and used for instances when simple digital movements were necessary. The Analog Joystick sold poorly in Japan due to its high cost and cumbersome size.

The increasing popularity of 3D games prompted Sony to add analogue sticks to its controller design to give users more freedom over their movements in virtual 3D environments. The first official analogue controller, the Dual Analog Controller, was revealed to the public in a small glass booth at the 1996 PlayStation Expo in Japan, and released in April 1997 to coincide with the Japanese releases of analogue-capable games Tobal 2 and Bushido Blade. In addition to the two analogue sticks (which also introduced two new buttons mapped to clicking in the analogue sticks), the Dual Analog controller features an "Analog" button and LED beneath the "Start" and "Select" buttons which toggles analogue functionality on or off. The controller also features rumble support, though Sony decided that haptic feedback would be removed from all overseas iterations before the United States release. A Sony spokesman stated that the feature was removed for "manufacturing reasons", although rumours circulated that Nintendo had attempted to legally block the release of the controller outside Japan due to similarities with the Nintendo 64 controller's Rumble Pak. However, a Nintendo spokesman denied that Nintendo took legal action. Next Generation's Chris Charla theorised that Sony dropped vibration feedback to keep the price of the controller down.

In November 1997, Sony introduced the DualShock controller. Its name derives from its use of two (dual) vibration motors (shock). Unlike its predecessor, its analogue sticks feature textured rubber grips, longer handles, slightly different shoulder buttons and has rumble feedback included as standard on all versions. The DualShock later replaced its predecessors as the default controller.

=== Peripherals ===
PlayStation Memory Card	PocketStation	Multiplayer Adaptor
PlayStation Memory Card	PocketStation	PlayStation Multitap
PlayStation Mouse	Link Cables	GunCon
PlayStation Mouse	PlayStation Link Cable	GunCon

Sony released a series of peripherals to add extra layers of functionality to the PlayStation. Such peripherals include memory cards, the PlayStation Mouse, the PlayStation Link Cable, the Multiplayer Adapter (a four-player multitap), the Memory Drive (a disk drive for 3.5-inch floppy disks), the GunCon (a light gun), and the Glasstron (a monoscopic head-mounted display).

Released exclusively in Japan, the PocketStation is a memory card peripheral which acts as a miniature personal digital assistant. The device features a monochrome liquid crystal display (LCD), infrared communication capability, a real-time clock, built-in flash memory, and sound capability. Sharing similarities with the Dreamcast's VMU peripheral, the PocketStation was typically distributed with certain PlayStation games, enhancing them with added features. The PocketStation proved popular in Japan, selling over five million units. Sony planned to release the peripheral outside Japan but the release was cancelled, despite receiving promotion in Europe and North America.

=== Functionality ===
In addition to playing games, most PlayStation models are equipped to play CD-Audio. The Asian model SCPH-5903 can also play Video CDs. Like most CD players, the PlayStation can play songs in a programmed order, shuffle the playback order of the disc and repeat one song or the entire disc. Later PlayStation models use a music visualisation function called SoundScope. This function, as well as a memory card manager, is accessed by starting the console without either inserting a game or closing the CD tray, thereby accessing a graphical user interface (GUI) for the PlayStation BIOS. The GUI for the PS One and PlayStation differ depending on the firmware version: the original PlayStation GUI had a dark blue background with rainbow graffiti used as buttons, while the early PAL PlayStation and PS One GUI had a grey blocked background with two icons in the middle.

PlayStation emulation is versatile and can be run on numerous modern devices. Bleem! was a commercial emulator which was released for IBM-compatible PCs and the Dreamcast in 1999. It was notable for being aggressively marketed during the PlayStation's lifetime, and was the centre of multiple controversial lawsuits filed by Sony. Bleem! was programmed in assembly language, which allowed it to emulate PlayStation games with improved visual fidelity, enhanced resolutions, and filtered textures that was not possible on original hardware. Sony sued Bleem! two days after its release, citing copyright infringement and accusing the company of engaging in unfair competition and patent infringement by allowing use of PlayStation BIOSs on a Sega console. Bleem! were subsequently forced to shut down in November 2001.

=== Copy protection system ===
Sony was aware that using CDs for game distribution could have left games vulnerable to piracy, due to the growing popularity of CD-R and optical disc drives with burning capability. To preclude illegal copying, a proprietary process for PlayStation disc manufacturing was developed that, in conjunction with an augmented optical drive in Tiger H/E assembly, prevented burned copies of games from booting on an unmodified console. Specifically, all genuine PlayStation discs were printed with a small section of deliberate irregular data, which the PlayStation's optical pick-up was capable of detecting and decoding. Consoles would not boot game discs without a specific wobble frequency contained in the data of the disc pregap sector (the same system was also used to encode discs' regional lockouts). This signal was within Red Book CD tolerances, so PlayStation discs' actual content could still be read by a conventional disc drive; however, the disc drive could not detect the wobble frequency (therefore duplicating the discs omitting it), since the laser pick-up system of any optical disc drive would interpret this wobble as an oscillation of the disc surface and compensate for it in the reading process.

=== Hardware problems ===
Early PlayStations are susceptible to overheating, which could cause the plastic CD holder to warp slightly, resulting in read errors responsible for skipping FMV. The solution is to avoid blocking the vents on the bottom of the unit by setting it on thick surfaces like carpet and avoiding additional heat intake by not placing it on top of another heat generating appliance like a television. Sony representatives also recommended unplugging the PlayStation when it is not in use, as the system draws in a small amount of power (and therefore heat) even when turned off.

The first batch of PlayStations use a KSM-440AAM laser unit, whose case and movable parts are all built out of plastic. Over time, the plastic lens sled rail wears out—usually unevenly—due to friction. The placement of the laser unit close to the power supply accelerates wear, due to the additional heat, which makes the plastic more vulnerable to friction. Eventually, one side of the lens sled will become so worn that the laser can tilt, no longer pointing directly at the CD; after this, games will no longer load due to data read errors. Sony fixed the problem by making the sled out of die-cast metal and placing the laser unit further away from the power supply on later PlayStation models.

Due to an engineering oversight, the PlayStation does not produce a proper signal on several older models of televisions, causing the display to flicker or bounce around the screen. Sony decided not to change the console design, since only a small percentage of PlayStation owners used such televisions, and instead gave consumers the option of sending their PlayStation unit to a Sony service centre to have an official modchip installed, allowing play on older televisions.

== Game library ==
The PlayStation featured a diverse game library which grew to appeal to all types of players. Critically acclaimed PlayStation games included Crash Bandicoot (1996), Tomb Raider (1996), Final Fantasy VII (1997), Spyro the Dragon (1998), Metal Gear Solid (1998), all of which became established franchises. Final Fantasy VII is credited with allowing role-playing games to gain mass-market appeal outside Japan, and is considered one of the most influential and greatest video games ever made. The PlayStation's bestselling game is Gran Turismo (1997), which sold 10.85 million units. After the PlayStation's discontinuation in 2006, the cumulative software shipment was 962 million units. The last original PlayStation game in North America was FIFA Football 2005, released in October 2004; the last game in Europe was Moorhuhn X, released in July 2005; (including re-releases) in Japan, the last were Super Pang Collection, Rockman, and Rockman 2: Dr. Wily no Nazo, released in March 2007 by the Capcom Game Books line; and in North America, the last was Persona 2: Eternal Punishment, in November 2008, the last to use the console's classic black disc media. Later releases containing PlayStation games were compilation sets intended for newer systems via backward compatibility and collectors, and featured standard silver discs instead.

Following its 1994 launch in Japan, early games included Ridge Racer, Crime Crackers, King's Field, Motor Toon Grand Prix, Toh Shin Den (i.e. Battle Arena Toshinden), and Kileak: The Blood. The first two games available at its later North American launch were Jumping Flash! (1995) and Ridge Racer, with Jumping Flash! heralded as an ancestor for 3D graphics in console gaming. Wipeout, Air Combat, Twisted Metal, Warhawk and Destruction Derby were among the popular first-year games, and the first to be reissued as part of Sony's Greatest Hits or Platinum range.

At the time of the PlayStation's first Christmas season, Psygnosis had produced around 70% of its launch catalogue; their breakthrough racing game Wipeout was acclaimed for its techno soundtrack and helped raise awareness of Britain's underground music community. Eidos Interactive's action-adventure game Tomb Raider contributed substantially to the success of the console in 1996, with its main protagonist Lara Croft becoming an early gaming icon and garnering unprecedented media promotion. Licensed tie-in video games of popular films were also prevalent; Argonaut Games' 2001 adaptation of Harry Potter and the Philosopher's Stone went on to sell over eight million copies late in the console's lifespan. Third-party developers committed largely to the console's wide-ranging game catalogue even after the launch of the PlayStation 2; some of the notable exclusives in this era include Harry Potter and the Philosopher's Stone, Fear Effect 2: Retro Helix, Syphon Filter 3, C-12: Final Resistance, Dance Dance Revolution Konamix and Digimon World 3. (Note: Based on Metacritic analysis for post-2000 games.)

Initially, in the United States, PlayStation games were packaged in long cardboard boxes, similar to non-Japanese 3DO and Saturn games. Sony later switched to the jewel case format typically used for audio CDs and Japanese video games, as this format took up less retailer shelf space (which was at a premium due to the large number of PlayStation games being released), and focus testing showed that most consumers preferred this format.

== Reception ==
The PlayStation was mostly well received upon release. Critics in the west generally welcomed the new console; the staff of Next Generation reviewed the PlayStation a few weeks after its North American launch, where they commented that, while the CPU is "fairly average", the supplementary custom hardware, such as the GPU and sound processor, is stunningly powerful. They praised the PlayStation's focus on 3D, and complemented the comfort of its controller and the convenience of its memory cards. Giving the system 4 1/2 out of 5 stars, they concluded, "To succeed in this extremely cut-throat market, you need a combination of great hardware, great games, and great marketing. Whether by skill, luck, or just deep pockets, Sony has scored three out of three in the first salvo of this war." Albert Kim from Entertainment Weekly praised the PlayStation as a technological marvel, rivalling that of Sega and Nintendo. Famicom Tsūshin scored the console a 19 out of 40, lower than the Saturn's 24 out of 40, in May 1995.

In a 1997 year-end review, a team of five Electronic Gaming Monthly editors gave the PlayStation scores of 9.5, 8.5, 9.0, 9.0, and 9.5—for all five editors, the highest score they gave to any of the five consoles reviewed in the issue. They lauded the breadth and quality of the games library, saying it had vastly improved over previous years due to developers mastering the system's capabilities in addition to Sony revising their stance on 2D and role playing games. They also complimented the low price point of the games compared to the Nintendo 64's, and noted that it was the only console on the market that could be relied upon to deliver a solid stream of games for the coming year, primarily due to third party developers almost unanimously favouring it over its competitors.

== Legacy ==
SCE was an upstart in the video game industry in late 1994, as the video game market in the early 1990s was dominated by Nintendo and Sega. Nintendo had been the clear leader in the industry since the introduction of the Nintendo Entertainment System in 1985 and the Nintendo 64 was initially expected to maintain this position. The PlayStation's target audience included the generation which was the first to grow up with mainstream video games, along with 18-29-year-olds who were not the primary focus of Nintendo. By the late 1990s, Sony became a highly regarded console brand due to the PlayStation, with a significant lead over second-place Nintendo, while Sega was relegated to a distant third.

The PlayStation became the first "computer entertainment platform" to ship over 100 million units worldwide, with many critics attributing the console's success to third-party developers. It remains the sixth best-selling console of all time as of 2025, with a total of 102.49 million units sold. Around 7,900 individual games were published for the console during its 11-year life span, the second-most games ever produced for a console. Its success resulted in a significant financial boon for Sony as profits from their video game division contributed to 23%.

Sony's next-generation PlayStation 2, which is backward compatible with the PlayStation's DualShock controller and games, was announced in 1999 and launched in 2000. The PlayStation's lead in installed base and developer support paved the way for the success of its successor, which overcame the earlier launch of the Sega's Dreamcast and then fended off competition from Microsoft's newcomer Xbox and Nintendo's GameCube. The PlayStation 2's immense success and failure of the Dreamcast were among the main factors which led to Sega abandoning the console market. To date, five PlayStation home consoles have been released, which have continued the same numbering scheme, as well as two portable systems. The PlayStation 3 also maintained backward compatibility with original PlayStation discs. Hundreds of PlayStation games have been digitally re-released on the PlayStation Portable, PlayStation 3, PlayStation Vita, PlayStation 4, and PlayStation 5.

The PlayStation has often ranked among the best video game consoles. In 2018, Retro Gamer named it the third best console, crediting its sophisticated 3D capabilities as one of its key factors in gaining mass success, and lauding it as a "game-changer in every sense possible". In 2009, IGN ranked the PlayStation the seventh best console in their list, noting its appeal towards older audiences to be a crucial factor in propelling the video game industry, as well as its assistance in transitioning game industry to use the CD-ROM format. Keith Stuart from The Guardian likewise named it as the seventh best console in 2020, declaring that its success was so profound it "ruled the 1990s".

Emulated PS1 jitter in Unity

The PlayStation's texture warping, originally an artifact caused by affine texture mapping, has become iconic and is now recreated in various retro-styled games. Veteran programmer Koji Sugimoto expressed on social media that the game developers "used to put in painstaking work and made many futile efforts to avoid texture warping, [...] only for it to be called 'charming' nowadays." (translation).

In January 2025, Lorentio Brodesco announced the nsOne project, attempting to reverse engineer PlayStation's motherboard. Brodesco stated that "detailed documentation on the original motherboard was either incomplete or entirely unavailable". The project was successfully crowdfunded via Kickstarter. In June, Brodesco manufactured the first working motherboard, promising to bring a fully rooted version with multilayer routing as well as documentation and design files in the near future.

=== CD format ===
The success of the PlayStation contributed to the demise of cartridge-based home consoles. While not the first system to use an optical disc format, it was the first highly successful one, and ended up going head-to-head with the proprietary cartridge-relying Nintendo 64, (Note: The Nintendo 64 was the last major home console to use cartridges as its primary storage format until the Nintendo Switch in 2017.) which the industry had expected to use CDs like PlayStation. After the demise of the Sega Saturn, Nintendo was left as Sony's main competitor in Western markets. Nintendo chose not to use CDs for the Nintendo 64; they were likely concerned with the proprietary cartridge format's ability to help enforce copy protection, given their substantial reliance on licensing and exclusive games for their revenue.

Besides their larger capacity, CD-ROMs could be produced in bulk quantities at a much faster rate than ROM cartridges, a week compared to two to three months. Further, the cost of production per unit was far cheaper, allowing Sony to offer games about 40% lower cost to the user compared to ROM cartridges while still making the same amount of net revenue. In Japan, Sony published fewer copies of a wide variety of games for the PlayStation as a risk-limiting step, a model that had been used by Sony Music for CD audio discs. The production flexibility of CD-ROMs meant that Sony could produce larger volumes of popular games to get onto the market quickly, something that could not be done with cartridges due to their manufacturing lead time. The lower production costs of CD-ROMs also allowed publishers an additional source of profit: budget-priced reissues of games which had already recouped their development costs.

Tokunaka remarked in 1996:

Choosing CD-ROM is one of the most important decisions that we made. As I'm sure you understand, PlayStation could just as easily have worked with masked ROM [cartridges]. The 3D engine and everything—the whole PlayStation format—is independent of the media. But for various reasons (including the economies for the consumer, the ease of the manufacturing, inventory control for the trade, and also the software publishers) we deduced that CD-ROM would be the best media for PlayStation.

The increasing complexity of developing games pushed cartridges to their storage limits and gradually discouraged some third-party developers. Part of the CD format's appeal to publishers was that they could be produced at a significantly lower cost and offered more production flexibility to meet demand. As a result, some third-party developers switched to the PlayStation, including Square and Enix, whose Final Fantasy VII and Dragon Quest VII respectively had been planned for the Nintendo 64 (both companies later merged to form Square Enix). Other developers released fewer games for the Nintendo 64 (Konami, releasing only thirteen N64 games but over fifty on the PlayStation). Nintendo 64 game releases were less frequent than the PlayStation's, with many being developed by either Nintendo themselves or second-parties such as Rare.

=== PlayStation Classic ===
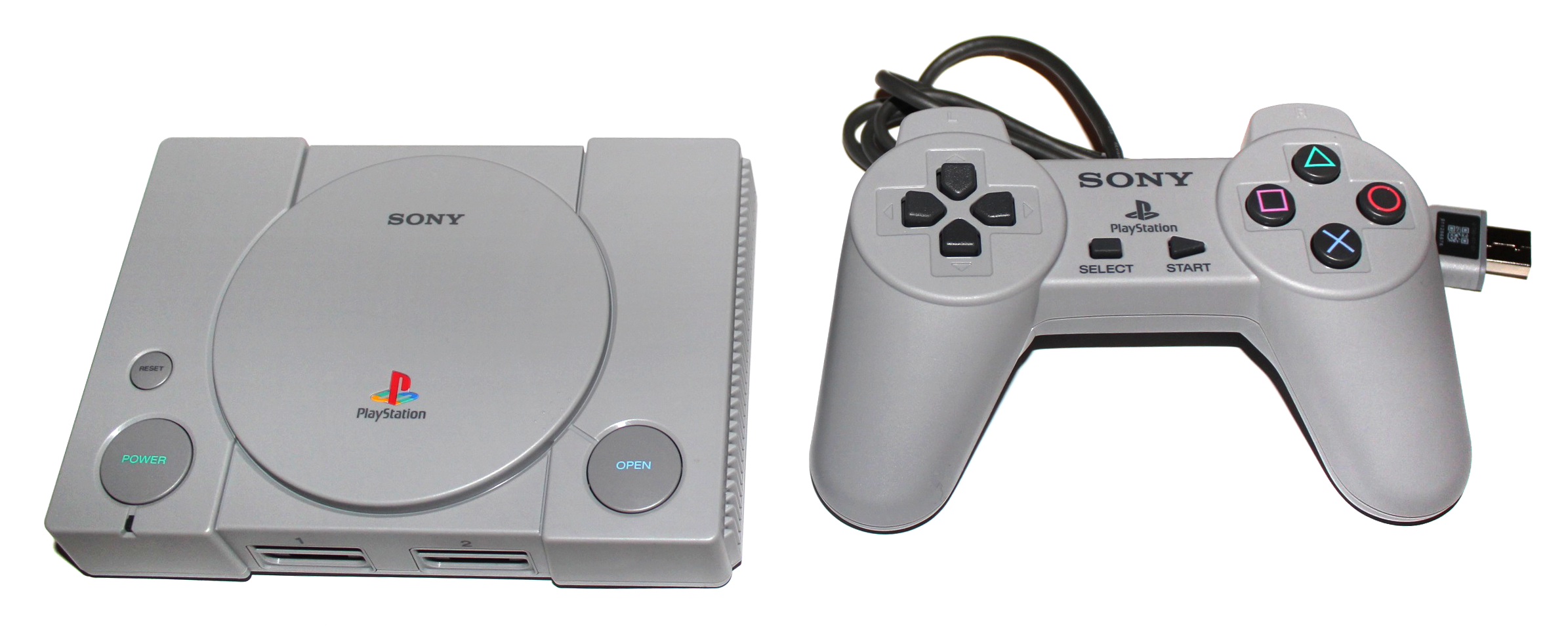
PlayStation Classic console and controller

The PlayStation Classic is a dedicated video game console made by Sony Interactive Entertainment that emulates PlayStation games. It was announced in September 2018 at the Tokyo Game Show, and released on 3 December 2018, the 24th anniversary of the release of the original console.

As a dedicated console, the PlayStation Classic features 20 pre-installed games; the games run off the open source emulator PCSX. The console is bundled with two replica wired PlayStation controllers (those without analogue sticks), an HDMI cable, and a USB-Type A cable. Internally, the console uses a MediaTek MT8167a Quad A35 system on a chip with four central processing cores clocked at @ 1.5 GHz and a Power VR GE8300 graphics processing unit. It includes 16 GB of eMMC flash storage and 1 Gigabyte of DDR3 SDRAM. The PlayStation Classic is 45% smaller than the original console.

The PlayStation Classic received negative reviews from critics and was compared unfavorably to Nintendo's rival Nintendo Entertainment System Classic Edition and Super Nintendo Entertainment System Classic Edition. Criticism was directed at its meagre game library, user interface, emulation quality, use of PAL versions for certain games, use of the original controller, and high retail price, though the console's design received praise. The console sold poorly.

== See also ==
- PCSX-Reloaded – PlayStation emulator for Microsoft Windows, Linux, and macOS
- PlayStation: The Official Magazine (PSM)
- Portable Sound Format (PSF)
- System 573
