= World Series Baseball '98 =

1997 video game

- North American Saturn box art, featuring Chipper Jones
- Developers: Saturn; Sega; Genesis; BlueSky Software
- Publisher: Sega (Note: Released under the Sega Sports banner.)
- Producers: David Perkinson; Scott Rohde
- Series: World Series Baseball
- Platforms: Sega Saturn, Sega Genesis
- Release: Saturn: JP: March 28, 1997; NA: July 22, 1997; KOR: November 1997; Genesis: NA: July 22, 1997
- Genre: Sports (baseball)
- Modes: Single-player, multiplayer

World Series Baseball '98 is a 1997 baseball video game published by Sega for the Sega Saturn and Sega Genesis. A sequel to World Series Baseball II, it was first released in Japan as Pro Yakyū Greatest Nine '97 (Note: Pro Yakyū GREATEST NINE '97 (プロ野球 グレイテストナイン'97, Puro Yakyū Gureitesuto Nain '97)), featuring teams and players from Nippon Professional Baseball. The North American version features Major League Baseball teams and players, while the Saturn version introduced three-dimensional polygonal graphics and a batting and pitching system based on selecting areas of the strike zone.

The Saturn version received generally positive reviews, particularly for its gameplay mechanics and transition to three-dimensional graphics, although critics identified shortcomings in its presentation and certain gameplay features. The Japanese version sold more than 182,000 copies, while the American release charted on the US charts.

A South Korean version was released to much marketing and promotion, but met with disappointing sales which was blamed on piracy. The game was nominated for Console Sports Game of the Year at the inaugural Interactive Achievement Awards and later influenced Sega's future baseball games on the Dreamcast.

== Gameplay ==
Gameplay screenshot from the Sega Saturn version.

World Series Baseball '98 is a baseball simulation in which players control batting, pitching, fielding and baserunning. The Saturn version uses a four-part batting system based around the strike zone. Each batter has areas in which they are comparatively strong or weak, and before a pitch the player can select one of four quadrants corresponding to buttons on the controller. Correctly anticipating where the pitch will enter the strike zone increases the likelihood of solid contact, while selecting the wrong quadrant can result in weaker contact. Players can also decline to select a quadrant in order to concentrate on making contact rather than hitting for power.

Pitchers have individual pitch repertoires based on their real-life counterparts, with the player choosing pitch type and location while attempting to exploit a batter's weaker areas. Next Generation described the pitcher–batter contest as requiring the batter to anticipate pitch type and location while the pitcher varies speed and placement and avoids the hitter's stronger zones. Fielding ability also varies between players; stronger defensive players can make more accurate throws, while pitcher effectiveness declines with fatigue. The game additionally includes injuries, errors and rain delays. Both fielding and baserunning can be controlled manually or left to the computer.

The game features four modes of play, including a full 162-game season, playoff play and a Home Run Derby. The North American version's season mode follows the 1997 Major League Baseball schedule, incorporating interleague play, which was introduced that year. Player statistics can be recorded and tracked across more than 20 categories.

The Japanese release also featured an expanded team-editing system, allowing players to create their own teams by selecting names, home grounds and uniform colours. Players could customise individual athletes' appearances, physical attributes, positions and abilities, while existing professional players could be recruited through one-for-one trades.

== Development and release ==
For the Saturn version, Sega introduced a new 3D polygon-based graphics engine and used motion capture to reproduce the movements of professional baseball players. Sega also implemented artificial intelligence intended to emphasize baseball strategy rather than purely arcade-style play. In a February 1997 interview with Saturn Fan, members of the Japanese development team explained that they had incorporated feedback from players of earlier Greatest Nine games, particularly concerning the interaction between pitchers and batters. They sought to reproduce the strategic elements of real baseball while improving player animations and expanding the ability to create customised teams.

The Japanese version, Pro Yakyū Greatest Nine '97, featured 11 baseball stadiums, including the Tokyo Dome, Nagoya Dome, Koshien Stadium and Yokohama Stadium. It also featured all 12 teams from Nippon Professional Baseball's Central League and Pacific League, with player rosters based on the 1997 season.

An updated version of the Japanese release, titled Pro Yakyū Greatest Nine '97: Make Miracle, was released for the Sega Saturn in Japan on September 25, 1997. It incorporated updated player data and introduced a "1997 Pennant" mode reflecting events from that year's Japanese baseball season. The revised edition also featured gameplay and presentation adjustments, alongside a team comprising 35 former Japanese professional baseball players.

The North American version was officially licensed by both Major League Baseball and the Major League Baseball Players Association. Sega included all 30 major-league ballparks, with the development team using photographs of the real stadiums as reference material. Newly built or developing venues represented in the game included Turner Field, Tropicana Field and Bank One Ballpark, while changes to the Oakland–Alameda County Coliseum were also incorporated.

The game was among five Sega Saturn games promoted through Sega of America's $25 million "Hard Stuff" advertising campaign, developed by Foote, Cone & Belding. Announced in September 1997, the campaign included television commercials scheduled to begin airing on MTV on 6 October, alongside print advertising and other promotional activities. The game was also advertised on the back cover of the October 1997 issue of GamePro, with an illustration depicting a scraped forearm.

In September 1997, Kama Entertainment signed an official agreement with Sega to distribute Saturn hardware and software in South Korea. World Series Baseball '98 was among the first new Saturn titles selected for Kama's renewed distribution efforts in the country. Originally scheduled for early October, the game was released in late November 1997.

Kama Entertainment promoted the South Korean release of World Series Baseball '98 through a campaign offering a complimentary controller to the first 1,000 customers who purchased both a Sega Saturn and the game. The company also organised a tournament scheduled for 21 December 1997 in Seoul, with the first-place prize including a trip to watch South Korean baseball player Chan Ho Park compete in Major League Baseball during the 1998 season.

== Reception ==
Reception

Review scores
| Publication | Score | |
| Publication | Saturn | Sega Genesis |
|---|---|---|
| AllGame | N/A | 3/5 |
| CNET Gamecenter | 8/10 | N/A |
| Electronic Gaming Monthly | 8/10 | N/A |
| Famitsu | 27/40 | N/A |
| Game Informer | 9/10 | N/A |
| GameFan | 84% (Note: In GameFan's viewpoint of the Saturn version, one critic gave it 77, and the other 90.) | N/A |
| GameRevolution | A− | N/A |
| Next Generation | 5/5 | N/A |

Reviewing the Genesis version for GamePro, Air Hendrix criticised the lack of significant improvements over World Series Baseball '96, noting that the changes were largely limited to updated rosters and the introduction of interleague play. The reviewer recommended it primarily to players who did not already own a baseball game for the Genesis. (Note: GamePro gave the Genesis version 3.5/5 for graphics, 3.0/5 for sound, 3.0/5 for control, and 3.5/5 for fun factor.)

The Saturn version of World Series Baseball '98 received mostly positive reviews. Critics generally welcomed the series' transition to polygonal graphics, particularly its ability to maintain the fast-paced gameplay of earlier instalments.

However, several reviewers criticised the disproportionately large baseball bats, comparing them to wooden planks. North American reviewers also criticised the lack of a player-trading option, while the batting and pitching quadrant system received considerable praise. Next Generation argued that, combined with the game's detailed fielding controls and management strategies, the quadrant system represented a significant advancement for baseball video games. The magazine compared the game's impact on its genre to that of Doom and NFL GameDay 97, declaring it the new standard for baseball games.

Other critics were more measured, although still positive. GamePro concluded that the game's fast-paced, enjoyable gameplay outweighed its graphical and audio shortcomings, comparing it favourably with contemporary Saturn baseball titles such as Grand Slam. (Note: GamePro gave the Saturn version 4.0/5 for graphics, 4.0/5 for sound, 4.0/5 for control, and 4.5/5 for fun factor.) Electronic Gaming Monthly reviewers Kraig Kujawa and Dean Hager both considered it inferior to MLB '98, but nevertheless regarded it as a strong baseball game. Hager described it as the best baseball game available for the Saturn.

In a February 1998 overview, South Korean magazine Game Champ highlighted the Saturn version's smoother graphics compared with its predecessor, alongside improvements to stadium presentation, camera movement and player animations.

Japanese magazine Sega Saturn Magazine awarded the game's Japanese release, Pro Yakyū Greatest Nine '97, individual reviewer scores of 8, 9 and 8 out of 10. The reviewers praised its realistic player animations, batting mechanics and extensive customisation options, with one particularly recommending its two-player mode. However, they also noted the difficulty of some fielding controls and questioned whether every feature enhanced the gameplay experience. In the final Sega Saturn Magazine reader rankings, subsequently compiled in the 2000 book Saturn no Game wa Sekai Ichi!, Pro Yakyū Greatest Nine '97 ranked 165th among 945 rated Saturn games, with an average reader score of 8.6683 out of 10.

At the inaugural Interactive Achievement Awards, the Academy of Interactive Arts & Sciences nominated the Saturn version for "Console Sports Game of the Year", which was ultimately awarded to International Superstar Soccer 64.

== Commercial performance ==
In the United States, the Genesis version of World Series Baseball '98 topped the platform's rental chart at Blockbuster Video stores in GamePro's July 1997 "Hot Rentals" listing. The Saturn version ranked tenth on an all-formats video game sales chart published in the September 1997 issue of Swedish magazine Super Play. In the November 1997 issue of Computer and Video Games, the Saturn version ranked third on the magazine's American multi-format sales chart.

The Japanese Saturn version, Pro Yakyū Greatest Nine '97, debuted at number one on Sega Saturn Magazine's Japanese software sales chart for the week of March 25–31, 1997. By November 1997, the game had sold an estimated 182,000 copies, ranking 49th among the Saturn's best-selling games in Japan.

In South Korea, the Saturn version had sold fewer than 1,000 legitimate copies by late December 1997, while local distributor Kama Entertainment estimated that approximately 10,000 pirated copies had been sold. Following disappointing sales during the year-end shopping season, Kama announced plans to take legal action against three retailers in Seoul's Yongsan Electronics Land district accused of distributing unauthorised copies. According to the February 1998 issue of Game Champ, two retailers had allegedly been selling pirated discs reproduced in Taiwan and elsewhere, while a third had been producing its own copies.

== Legacy and influence ==
The game was later credited with influencing subsequent baseball titles. In a 2000 retrospective, GameSpot described many of the ideas introduced in World Series Baseball '98 as sufficiently innovative that competing games adopted them and spent approximately two years catching up.

World Series Baseball '98 influenced Sega's subsequent baseball games on the Dreamcast. During the development of World Series Baseball 2K1, Sega producer David Perkinson said that the team had learned from the World Series Baseball games on the Saturn and Genesis and intended to carry their strongest elements into the Dreamcast game, including their balance between simulation and arcade-style gameplay. Perkinson later described World Series Baseball '98's transition to polygonal characters and three-dimensional rendering as a major evolution for the Saturn series which helped set the direction for its subsequent development on Dreamcast.

In a 2021 retrospective of the greatest baseball games on each major console, Bleacher Report chose World Series Baseball 98 for the Sega Saturn and noted that "it represented a massive step forward relative to previous baseball games in terms of making the batter/pitcher matchup the focal point of the game."
