= World Series Baseball =

World Series Baseball may refer to:

- Intellivision World Series Baseball, a 1983 video game for the Mattel Intellivision
- World Series Baseball (series), a video game series developed by Sega
- World Series Baseball (1993 video game), first game of the World Series Baseball series released in 1993
- World Series Baseball (1995 video game), a Sega Saturn video game released in 1995

== See also ==
- World Series, the Major League Baseball championship after which these games are named
