= Triple Play 96 =

1995 video game

- Developer: Extended Play Productions
- Publisher: EA Sports
- Series: Triple Play
- Platform: Sega Genesis
- Release: NA: June 1995; Gold Edition: NA: October 1996
- Genre: Sports
- Modes: Single-player, multiplayer

Triple Play 96 is a sports video game developed by Canadian studio Extended Play Productions and published by EA Sports for the Sega Genesis. An updated version titled Triple Play: Gold Edition was released exclusively for the Sega Genesis the following year and added updated 1996 rosters and a new "Professional Mode".

== Gameplay ==
Triple Play 96 gives players the option of using an enlarged view or normal view, and allows for trading players, and includes a season mode and player stats.

== Development and release ==
Triple Play 96 was produced by Canadian studio Extended Play Productions, which was a developer within Electronic Arts division EA Canada. The game's lead designer, Chris Taylor, started at EA Canada (then Distinctive Software) in 1988. EA asked the team to replicate the success they had on Sega Genesis release of FIFA International Soccer with other sports. Baseball was chosen as Taylor had experience leading production on HardBall II. Prior to using on the name Triple Play, the titles Line Drive Baseball and Double Play Baseball were considered but were both already copyrighted.

Taylor sought help from Rick Smith to provide a robust statistics calculation system by breaking down "pseudo code" into C. Programmer Kevin Pickell, who wrote the Genesis data and asset libraries for EA Canada, stated their task was "to essentially mirror the look and feel of FIFA" and they "already had the workflow for generating the animating characters and that was essentially copied for Triple Play." The large batter sprites popularized by the World Series Baseball influenced Taylor to include them in Triple Play. This was the last EA game Taylor worked before moving on to Cavedog Entertainment and then eventually Gas Powered Games.

A promotion event for Triple Play on the Sega Channel had 10,000 participants. The game went to retail for the Genesis exclusively in North America in June 1995. An updated version, Triple Play: Gold Edition, was released for Genesis in October 1996. Enhanced ports for the PlayStation and Sega Saturn were also announced. Sega listed them for a July 1996 release but they never materialized.

== Reception ==
Reception

Review scores
Publication	Score
AllGame	4.5/5
Electronic Gaming Monthly	17.5/20
Game Informer	8.25/10 (original); 8.25/10 (Gold)
GamePro	3.875/5
Hyper	90%
Next Generation	3/5
Fusion	B
Gamers	84/100
MegaZone	89%
VideoGames	8/10

Next Generation reviewed the Genesis version of the game, rating it three stars out of five, and stated that "Triple Play Baseball is a solid baseball effort, and it ranks right up there with Sega's World Series '95".

The Gold Edition was the runner up Genesis game of the year by Electronic Gaming Monthly.
