= MLB '98 =

1997 video game

- Developer: Sony Interactive Studios America
- Publisher: Sony Computer Entertainment
- Series: MLB
- Platform: PlayStation
- Release: NA: August 1997
- Genre: Sports (baseball)
- Modes: Single-player, multiplayer

MLB ‘98 is a 1997 baseball video game developed by Sony Interactive Studios America and published by Sony Computer Entertainment for the PlayStation. It precedes MLB '99 and is the sequel to MLB Pennant Race.

== Gameplay ==
Games are called by public address announcer Mike Carlucci. New York Yankees center fielder Bernie Williams was featured on the cover. Some of its features are the 30 Major League Baseball clubs, six playing modes, complete statistic tracking, and creating players.

It has been succeeded by MLB '99, where Vin Scully began calling the games. Starting with MLB 2000, joining him is infielder Dave Campbell on color commentary.

== Reception ==
Reception

Aggregate score
Aggregator	Score
GameRankings	74%

Review scores
Publication	Score
Electronic Gaming Monthly	9/10
Game Informer	6/10
GameFan	93% (Note: In GameFan's viewpoint of the game, one critic gave it 93, and the other 92.)
GamePro	5/5 (Note: GamePro gave the game two 4.5/5 scores for graphics and control, 4/5 for sound, and a perfect 5/5 for overall fun factor.)
GameRevolution	A−
GameSpot	6.2/10
IGN	8/10
Next Generation	3/5
Official U.S. PlayStation Magazine	3/5

MLB '98 received above-average reviews according to the review aggregation website GameRankings. Most critics praised the fluid animation, comprehensive licensing, extensive features, and the usually fast pace of the games. The two sports reviewers of Electronic Gaming Monthly both gave it a 9 out of 10, with Kraig Kujawa describing it as "fast-paced, straightforward and (most importantly) fun." GameSpot's Glenn Rubenstein was much less enthusiastic, commenting that while the game has all the expected features, it fails to truly stand out in any area, leaving him certain that a superior baseball game would come out by Christmas. Next Generation said, "There's no denying that MLB '98 is a good, solid baseball game that surpasses Triple Play '98 in many respects. However, in the grander scheme of console baseball, MLB '98 does nothing to advance the genre and can't even clean the cleats of Sega's World Series Baseball '98 for Saturn." GamePro concluded that it "gets rookies into the action right away and can definitely keep the most seasoned veteran hooked for an entire season. If you like your baseball served up arcade-style, MLB '98 is the only game you need to order."

Just a few months after MLB '98 was released, Electronic Gaming Monthly listed it as number 97 on their "100 Best Games of All Time", saying it "has its minor flaws and bugs, but overall it's the best 32-Bit baseball game."
