= Triple Play Baseball =

2001 video game

- Developer: Treyarch
- Publisher: EA Sports
- Platforms: PlayStation, PlayStation 2, Microsoft Windows
- Release: Windows: NA: March 6, 2001; PlayStation, PlayStation 2: NA: March 13, 2001
- Genre: Sports
- Modes: Single player, multiplayer

Triple Play Baseball is a baseball sports game released for the PlayStation, PlayStation 2 and Microsoft Windows in 2001. It would be the last game in the Triple Play series released for the PlayStation and Microsoft Windows, but was the first game in the series to be released on the PlayStation 2. The game features Oakland Athletics first baseman Jason Giambi on the cover.

Triple Play Baseball was the first and only game in the triple play baseball series not to feature a year on the title. The new game featured a robust "create a player" option and Big League Challenge Mode. The players can play a single player game, a full season, playoffs, or Home Run Derby. Team selection and transfers come under player control. On the PS1 version, Jim Hughson and Buck Martinez provide the commentary, while on PS2 version it is Sean McDonough.

Singer Vitamin C provided motion capture for the video game, which featured her cover of the Waitresses' song "I Know What Boys Like".

== Reception ==
Reception

Aggregate score
Aggregator	Score		
Aggregator	PC	PS	PS2
Metacritic	58/100	76/100	74/100

Review scores
Publication	Score		
Publication	PC	PS	PS2
AllGame	4.5/5	N/A	3.5/5
Computer Games Strategy Plus	1.5/5	N/A	N/A
Computer Gaming World	1.5/5	N/A	N/A
Electronic Gaming Monthly	N/A	6.5/10 (Note: Three critics of Electronic Gaming Monthly gave the PlayStation version each a score of 7.5/10, 7/10, and 5/10.)	7/10 (Note: In Electronic Gaming Monthly's review of the PlayStation 2 version, one critic gave it 6/10, and the rest gave it each a score of 7.5/10.)
EP Daily	8/10	8.5/10	8/10
Game Informer	N/A	7/10	7.75/10
GameRevolution	N/A	C+	N/A
GameSpot	5.1/10	8.5/10	8.3/10
GameSpy	70%	N/A	87%
GameZone	6.5/10	7.5/10	7.3/10
IGN	7.8/10	7.2/10	7.2/10
Next Generation	N/A	2/5	3/5
Official U.S. PlayStation Magazine	N/A	2.5/5	2/5
PC Gamer (US)	40%	N/A	N/A
Maxim	N/A	N/A	4/5
Playboy	N/A	N/A	80%

The PlayStation version received "generally favorable reviews", while the PC and PS2 versions received "mixed or average reviews", according to the review aggregation website Metacritic. Rob Smolka of NextGen said of the former console version in its June 2001 issue: "EA Sports dropped the year from the title, but little else has changed for this final version for the original PlayStation." Daniel Erickson later said in the magazine's July 2001 issue that the latter console version was "drop-dead gorgeous and fun at parties, but it'll disappoint sim fans to no end." Glenn Rubestein of Extended Play gave the same console version all five stars and said it was "the game to own this season. Its graphical prowess and full range of features make it the most complete title on the market. EA Sports' commitment to quality really shines through, offering one of the best baseball games ever seen on any home console system."

Air Hendrix of GamePro said of the PlayStation version, "If you've already played Triple Play 2001 to death, that means there's no reason to upgrade unless you're a consummate fan. But if you haven't bought a new PlayStation baseball game in a while, this is the real deal, delivering the fast-paced, action-filled baseball that is Triple Play's trademark." (Note: GamePro gave the PlayStation version two 4.5/5 scores for graphics and sound, and two 4/5 scores for control and fun factor.) However, he also said, "The PS2 pennant race is still on, but Triple Play sure isn't one of the contenders." (Note: GamePro gave the PlayStation 2 version 4/5 for graphics, 4.5/5 for sound, and two 3/5 scores for control and fun factor.)
