= ESPN Baseball =

ESPN Baseball may refer to:

== Broadcasting ==
- Baseball Tonight, a television program reporting on the day's Major League Baseball action, which airs on ESPN
- ESPN Major League Baseball, a televised presentation of live Major League Baseball (MLB) games, which airs on ESPN
- Major League Baseball on ESPN Radio, broadcast presentations of live Major League Baseball games on ESPN Radio

== Video games ==
- ESPN Baseball Tonight, a video game released in 1994
- ESPN Major League Baseball (video game), a video game released in 2004

== See also ==
- Sunday Night Baseball
- Monday Night Baseball
- Tuesday Night Baseball
- Thursday Night Baseball
- Friday Night Baseball
