= MLB 2000 =

1999 baseball video game

- Anaheim Angels designated hitter Mo Vaughn featured on the cover.
- Developer: 989 Sports
- Publisher: Sony Computer Entertainment
- Series: MLB
- Platform: PlayStation
- Release: NA: March 29, 1999
- Genre: Sports (baseball)
- Modes: Single-player, multiplayer

MLB 2000 is a 1999 baseball video game developed by 989 Sports and published by Sony Computer Entertainment for the PlayStation. The color commentary for the game is from Dave Campbell and the play by play announcer is Vin Scully. Anaheim Angels designated hitter Mo Vaughn was featured on the cover.

It has been preceded by MLB '99 and succeeded by MLB 2001.

== Reception ==
Reception

Aggregate score
Aggregator	Score
GameRankings	81%

Review scores
Publication	Score
AllGame	4/5
CNET Gamecenter	8/10
Electronic Gaming Monthly	7.375/10 (Note: Two critics of Electronic Gaming Monthly gave the game each a score of 8/10, one gave it 7/10, and another gave it 6.5/10.)
Game Informer	8.5/10
GameFan	86% (Note: In GameFan's viewpoint of the game, one critic gave it 86, and the other 85.)
GamePro	4.5/5 (Note: GamePro gave the game two 4/5 scores for graphics and sound, and two 4.5/5 scores for control and fun factor.)
GameRevolution	B+
GameSpot	8/10
IGN	8.9/10
Next Generation	3/5
Official U.S. PlayStation Magazine	4/5

The game received "favorable" reviews according to the review aggregation website GameRankings. Next Generation said that the game "swings for the fences, but falls short. It doesn't do anything truly innovative, and it needed to in order to make up for some of the more annoying features of the game. It's still a fun game, but not the leader of the pack." Kraig Kujawa of Official U.S. PlayStation Magazine said, "If you're a die-hard fan of the MLB series, then MLB 2000 is worth picking up since it offers more of exactly the same. But if you have last year's MLB or no baseball game at all, then pick up EA's Triple Play 2000. It's better, and [it] has taken better advantage of its time in the off-season."
