= World Series Baseball 2K2 =

2001 video game

- North American Xbox box art, featuring Jason Giambi
- Developer: Visual Concepts
- Publisher: Sega (Note: Released under the Sega Sports banner.)
- Series: World Series Baseball
- Platforms: Dreamcast, Xbox
- Release: Dreamcast: NA: August 14, 2001; JP: April 18, 2002; Xbox: NA: May 21, 2002
- Genre: Sports (baseball)
- Modes: Single player, multiplayer

World Series Baseball 2K2, or World Series Baseball as it is known for Xbox, is a 2001 baseball video game developed by Visual Concepts and published by Sega for the Dreamcast and Xbox. It is the first game in the World Series Baseball series to be featured on the Xbox, and the first title in the series developed by Visual Concepts.

The game and the rest of the 2K titles on the Dreamcast have had their online components revived and are completely playable online.

== Gameplay ==
World Series Baseball consists of many game modes and features. The game modes are Play Now, Season, Franchise, and Create-A-Player. Jason Giambi is on the cover of the game.

Some new features updated from the Dreamcast version is in-depth trading and a 15- and 60-day Disabled List. In the new franchise mode there is a Management Draft, Rookie Draft, and a Free Agent Signing Period. Create-A-Player is also highly updated from the last version.

The online component of the Dreamcast version was brought back online by Shuouma on March 1, 2018 with plans to bring back other Sega sports in the near future as well.

== Reception ==
Reception

Aggregate score
Aggregator	Score	
Aggregator	Dreamcast	Xbox
Metacritic	69/100	85/100

Review scores
Publication	Score	
Publication	Dreamcast	Xbox
AllGame	N/A	3/5
Electronic Gaming Monthly	5.5/10	8.83/10
Famitsu	25/40	N/A
Game Informer	7/10	8/10
GamePro	3/5	5/5
GameRevolution	C	A−
GameSpot	7.7/10	7.4/10
GameSpy	6.5/10	79%
GameZone	N/A	7.5/10
IGN	8.7/10	9/10
Next Generation	4/5	N/A
Official Xbox Magazine (US)	N/A	8.8/10
Maxim	2/5	N/A
Playboy	50%	N/A

The Xbox version received "favorable" reviews, while the Dreamcast version received "average" reviews, according to the review aggregation website Metacritic. Maxim gave the latter console version a negative review, a few weeks before its release Stateside. However, Jim Preston of NextGen called the same console version "A vast improvement over the original with only a few shortcomings to mar the outing." In Japan, Famitsu gave it a score of 25 out of 40.
