= Greatest Nine =

1995 sports video game

- Developer: Sega CS1
- Publisher: Sega
- Platform: Sega Saturn
- Release: JP: May 26, 1995
- Genres: Sports (baseball)
- Modes: Single-player, multiplayer

Kanzen Chuukei Pro Yakyuu Greatest Nine (Note: Japanese: 完全中継プロ野球 グレイテストナイン, Hepburn: Kanzen Chūkei Puroyagu Gureitesutonain; "Full Broadcast of Professional Baseball Greatest Nine"), or simply Greatest Nine, is a baseball-themed sports video game developed by Sega CS1 and published by Sega in 1995 for the Sega Saturn. It spawned a franchise that remained exclusive to Japan until the 2002 release of Baseball Advance on the Game Boy Advance. A modified version of original Greatest Nine was released internationally as the 1995 iteration of World Series Baseball on the Saturn.

== Development and release ==
Kanzen Chūkei Pro Yakyū Greatest Nine was developed by Sega CS Research and Development No. 1. The project was led by graphic designer Takaya Segawa. He was new to the company and had only just completed his first game, Dr. Robotnik's Mean Bean Machine, in his second year there. Future Nippon Professional Baseball player Masahide Kobayashi (then in school at Nippon Sport Science University) was used for the game's motion capture. Greatest Nine launched for the Saturn in Japan on May 26, 1994. A modified version of the game with players from the Major League Baseball was released internationally later that year. Segawa later served the same role on Sega's Puroyagu Chīmu o Tsukurou! baseball series.

== Reception ==
Reception

Review scores
Publication	Score
Computer and Video Games	88/100
Famitsu	27/40
GameFan	97/100
Mean Machines Sega	86/100
Next Generation	4/5
Ação Games	8/10
Electronic Entertainment	4.5/5
Games World: The Magazine	81%
Joypad	90%
Mega Console	77/100
Sega Pro	69/100
Sega Saturn Magazine (JP)	21/30
Ultimate Future Games	70%

Next Generation rated it four stars out of five, and stated that "In the end, minus a few malfunctioning control features that Sega US promises to fix, Greatest Nine is an excellent sports title for the Saturn and an extremely encouraging sign of what's to come."

== Legacy ==
Greatest Nine quickly became a franchise for Sega. Counting the original game, six entries were released for the Sega Saturn between 1995 and 1998. It was later revived in 2002 on the Game Boy Advance (GBA). This version was developed by Smilebit (absorbed by Sega in 2004), also responsible for Motto Pro Yakyuu Team o Tsukurou!.

The 1996 sequel, Greatest Nine '96, was released for the Sega Saturn in Japan on 19 July 1996. Licensed by Nippon Professional Baseball, the game featured all 12 teams from Japan's Central and Pacific Leagues, with updated player data. One of its principal improvements was the replacement of the original game's four fictional stadiums with 11 real-world Japanese baseball stadiums.

The sequel also expanded the game's presentation with multiple camera angles, additional player animations and changes in weather conditions. Its team-editing system allowed players to create customised teams and determine individual player abilities by selecting combinations of three keywords.

Greatest Nine '96 incorporated television-style commentary performed by Japanese broadcaster Kenji Matsushita, alongside stadium public-address announcements voiced by Chiharu Tezuka. The game featured commentary that changed according to the circumstances of a match, with additional presentation effects influenced by weather conditions.

=== Sequels ===
- Greatest Nine '96 – Saturn (1996)
- Pro Yakyuu Greatest Nine '97 – Saturn (1997)
- Pro Yakyuu Greatest Nine '97 Make Miracle – Saturn (1997)
- Pro Yakyuu Greatest Nine '98 – Saturn (1998)
- Pro Yakyuu Greatest Nine '98 Summer Action – Saturn (1998)
- Baseball Advance – Game Boy Advance (2002)
