= MLB '99 =

1998 video game

- Baltimore Orioles third baseman Cal Ripken featured on the cover.
- Developer: Sony Interactive Studios America
- Publisher: Sony Computer Entertainment America
- Series: MLB
- Platform: PlayStation
- Release: NA: April 14, 1998
- Genre: Sports (baseball)
- Modes: Single-player, multiplayer

MLB '99 is a 1998 baseball video game developed by Sony Interactive Studios America and published by Sony Computer Entertainment for the PlayStation. Dave Campbell provided the color commentary while Vin Scully is the play-by-play announcer. Baltimore Orioles third baseman Cal Ripken Jr. is featured on the cover.

It was preceded by MLB '98 and succeeded by MLB 2000.

== Gameplay ==
This installment of the series introduces a Spring Training mode, in addition to the incumbent exhibition, season, playoff, and home run derby modes.

The game uses a cursor interface for pitching and batting. The player can adjust the batter's position and stance at the plate.

As with previous installments, players can create and trade ball players.

== Reception ==
Reception

Aggregate score
Aggregator	Score
GameRankings	78%

Review scores
Publication	Score
AllGame	4/5
Electronic Gaming Monthly	7.75/10
Game Informer	8.75/10
GameFan	89%
GameRevolution	B+
GameSpot	6.2/10
IGN	7/10
Next Generation	4/5
Official U.S. PlayStation Magazine	4/5

The game held a 78% on the review aggregation website GameRankings. Reviewers described Vin Scully's commentary as dull and lacking in variety, but praised the animation, controls, and especially the Spring Training mode. GameSpot explained that this mode "gives the game some life by making it feel as though every play counts."

Responses to the "Total Control batting" system were more mixed. John Ricciardi of Electronic Gaming Monthly said it results in an "annoying guessing game" when batting, while GameSpot, IGN, and GamePro all called it an outstanding feature. GamePro elaborated that "This feature really adds intensity to two-player contests because it forces you to outthink your opponent." Six months after the game was released, Next Generation took a middle ground on the issue its review, saying, "For neophytes and casual gamers, such a complex control scheme may seem more like work than fun. Skilled players, however, will rise to the challenge and welcome the flexibility."

Despite the general praise for MLB '99, most reviewers refrained from recommending it against its competition. GameSpot and IGN both recommended getting Triple Play 99 instead, with IGN saying that MLB '99 "lacks excitement" by comparison, while GamePro concluded that with so many excellent baseball video games coming out that year, consumers should rent each one before deciding which to buy. Ricciardi's co-reviewers Kraig Kujawa and Sushi-X asserted that MLB '99 was the best baseball video game on the PlayStation.
