= World Series Baseball (video game series) =

Video game series developed by Sega

World Series Baseball is a computer and video game series published by Sega from 1994 to 2003. The series would be succeeded by 2004's ESPN Major League Baseball.

Early in 1998 Sega announced that there would not be a World Series Baseball '99 because it was diverting all development to games for the new Katana console (eventually released as the Dreamcast), and the baseball game it was working on for the Katana would not be ready until at least 1999. The series's two-year hiatus ended with the release of World Series Baseball 2K1 in 2000. Visual Concepts would take over development of the series with 2001's World Series Baseball 2K2, and go on to develop 2K Sports' MLB 2K series following its acquisition by Take-Two Interactive.

== List of games ==
Title	Release date	Platform	Cover athlete	
Title	Release date	Platform	Name	Team
World Series Baseball	November 1993	Game Gear	None	
World Series Baseball	April 1994	Sega Genesis	None	
World Series Baseball	November 1995	Sega Saturn	Mike Piazza	Los Angeles Dodgers
World Series Baseball '95	October 1994	Game Gear	Bill Swift	San Francisco Giants
World Series Baseball '95	April 1995	Sega Genesis	Bill Swift	San Francisco Giants
World Series Baseball '95	February 1996	32X	Deion Sanders	San Francisco Giants
World Series Baseball '96	August 1996	Sega Genesis	Manny Ramirez	Cleveland Indians
World Series Baseball '96	September 20, 1996	Windows	Manny Ramirez	Cleveland Indians
World Series Baseball II	August 24, 1996	Sega Saturn	Fred McGriff	Atlanta Braves
World Series Baseball '98	July 22, 1997	Sega Saturn, Sega Genesis	Chipper Jones	Atlanta Braves
World Series Baseball 2K1	July 25, 2000	Dreamcast	Pedro Martínez	Boston Red Sox
World Series Baseball 2K2	August 14, 2001	Dreamcast	Pedro Martínez	Boston Red Sox
World Series Baseball 2K2	May 21, 2002	Xbox	Jason Giambi	New York Yankees
World Series Baseball 2K3	March 11, 2003	Xbox	Jason Giambi	New York Yankees
World Series Baseball 2K3	March 18, 2003	PlayStation 2	Jason Giambi	New York Yankees
ESPN Major League Baseball	April 6, 2004	Xbox	Jason Giambi	New York Yankees
ESPN Major League Baseball	May 4, 2004	PlayStation 2	Jason Giambi	New York Yankees
