= Triple Play 98 =

1997 video game

- Developer: EA Sports
- Publisher: EA Sports
- Series: Triple Play
- Platforms: PlayStation, Microsoft Windows
- Release: PlayStation: NA: May 13, 1997; JP: September 25, 1997; Windows: NA: June 10, 1997
- Genre: Sports video game
- Modes: Single player, multiplayer

Triple Play 98 is a baseball sports video game which was released in 1997 on the PlayStation and Microsoft Windows. The game was developed and published by EA Sports, and the next entry in the Triple Play series after Triple Play 97. The cover of the game features St. Louis Cardinals player Brian Jordan.

== Reception ==
Reception

Aggregate score
Aggregator	Score	
Aggregator	PC	PS
GameRankings	83%	82%

Review scores
Publication	Score	
Publication	PC	PS
AllGame	N/A	3.5/5
CNET Gamecenter	7/10	9/10
Computer Games Strategy Plus	2.5/5	N/A
Computer Gaming World	3/5	N/A
Electronic Gaming Monthly	N/A	7.5/10
Famitsu	N/A	26/40
Game Informer	9.25/10	9/10
GameFan	N/A	91%
GamePro	N/A	5/5
GameSpot	8.3/10	7.2/10
IGN	N/A	9.2/10
Next Generation	N/A	4/5
PC Gamer (US)	92%	N/A

The game received favorable reviews on both platforms according to the review aggregation website GameRankings. The most widely praised elements were the realistic graphics and animation and the comprehensiveness of the modes and features; GameSpot called the PlayStation version "the most thoroughly complete console baseball game ever." The unprecedented two-man commentary was also met with general approval, though some found the low frame rate interferes with the gameplay. Next Generation said: "The game still has some flaws with the AI, a slow frame-rate, and too much delay between batters, but in the end there is no baseball game on PlayStation that can even come close to Triple Play in graphics or playability." GamePro gave it a 4.5 out of 5 for control and a perfect 5 in every other category (graphics, sound, and fun factor), saying, "Tuned for novices and pros alike, the gameplay's rewarding and fun, and really brings to life the intensity of the pitcher-batter confrontation." In Japan, where the same console version was ported for release under the name Major League Baseball Triple Play 98 (メジャーリーグ ベースボール トリプルプレイ98, Mejā Rīgu Bēsubōru Toripuru Purei 98) on September 25, 1997, Famitsu gave it a score of 26 out of 40.

The Electric Playground’s Tommy Tallarico gave the game an 8.5, while co-host Victor Lucas gave it a 9.
