= World Series Baseball 2K3 =

2003 video game

- North American PlayStation 2 box art, featuring Jason Giambi
- Developer: Visual Concepts
- Publisher: Sega (Note: Released under the Sega Sports banner.)
- Series: World Series Baseball
- Engine: RenderWare
- Platforms: Xbox, PlayStation 2
- Release: Xbox: NA: March 11, 2003; PlayStation 2: NA: March 18, 2003
- Genre: Sports (baseball)
- Modes: Single-player, multiplayer

World Series Baseball 2K3 is a 2003 baseball video game developed by Visual Concepts and published by Sega for the PlayStation 2 and Xbox. It is the successor to World Series Baseball 2K2 (2001), and the last to carry the World Series Baseball name. It was released in March 2003, prior to the start of the 2003 Major League Baseball season. A version of the game was also being developed for the GameCube, but was ultimately canceled; Entertainment Weekly gave the same console version universal acclaim despite the fact that it was canceled months prior.

== Reception ==
Reception

Aggregate score
Aggregator	Score	
Aggregator	PS2	Xbox
Metacritic	87/100	89/100

Review scores
Publication	Score	
Publication	PS2	Xbox
Electronic Gaming Monthly	N/A	8/10
Game Informer	6.75/10	7/10
GamePro	5/5	5/5
GameRevolution	A−	A−
GameSpot	8.9/10	9.1/10
GameSpy	4/5	4/5
GameZone	9/10	9.3/10
IGN	9/10	9.1/10
Official U.S. PlayStation Magazine	4/5	N/A
Official Xbox Magazine (US)	N/A	8.8/10
Entertainment Weekly	A	A

The game received "generally favorable reviews" on both platforms, both a few points shy of "universal acclaim", according to the review aggregation website Metacritic.

GameSpot named the Xbox version the best game of March 2003.

== See also ==
- Major League Baseball 2K5
