= MLB 2001 =

2000 video game

- Chipper Jones of the Atlanta Braves featured on the cover.
- Developer: 989 Sports
- Publisher: 989 Sports
- Series: MLB
- Platform: PlayStation
- Release: NA: March 28, 2000
- Genre: Sports (baseball)
- Modes: Single-player, multiplayer

MLB 2001 is a 2000 baseball video game developed and published by 989 Sports for the PlayStation. The color commentary for the game is from Dave Campbell and the play by play announcer is Vin Scully. Chipper Jones of the Atlanta Braves was featured on the cover. It is the first game in the MLB series to not be published directly by Sony Computer Entertainment.

It was preceded by MLB 2000 and succeeded by MLB 2002.

== Reception ==
Reception

Aggregate score
Aggregator	Score
GameRankings	76%

Review scores
Publication	Score
CNET Gamecenter	8/10
Electronic Gaming Monthly	6.83/10 (Note: Three critics of Electronic Gaming Monthly gave the game each a score of 5/10, 7.5/10, and 8/10.)
EP Daily	8.5/10
Game Informer	7.75/10
GameFan	81% (Note: In GameFan's viewpoint of the game, one critic gave it 84, and the other 77.)
GameSpot	8.7/10
IGN	7.4/10
Official U.S. PlayStation Magazine	3/5
PlayStation: The Official Magazine	4/5

The game received "favorable" reviews according to the review aggregation website GameRankings. GamePro said, "While it may not have the flashiest graphics, MLB 2001 delivers topnotch sound, solid controls, and a better-balanced and more realistic baseball simulation than either Triple Play or High Heat." (Note: GamePro gave the game 4/5 for graphics, and three 4.5/5 scores for sound, control, and fun factor.)
