= Triple Play 2000 =

1999 video game

- Developer: EA Canada (Note: Ported to Nintendo 64 by Treyarch)
- Publisher: EA Sports
- Series: Triple Play
- Platforms: PlayStation, Nintendo 64, Microsoft Windows
- Release: NA: March 24, 1999; EU: May 07, 1999
- Genre: Sports
- Modes: Single-player, multiplayer

Triple Play 2000 is a baseball sports game released for the PlayStation, Nintendo 64 and Microsoft Windows in 1999. It is the only game of the Triple Play series released for the Nintendo 64 where it was released in North America. It features the 1999 rosters and 1998 stats which included Sammy Sosa's 66 HR and Mark McGwire's 70 home runs.

The game features real players and teams active at the time of production. Players can play single matches, an entire season, the playoffs, or a home run derby. Team selection and transfers come under player control. Jim Hughson and Buck Martinez provide the commentary on all console versions except Martinez, who was not featured in the Nintendo 64 version. The game was the first version to support Internet play on the PC.

== Reception ==
Reception

Aggregate score
Aggregator	Score		
Aggregator	N64	PC	PS
GameRankings	65%	75%	87%

Review scores
Publication	Score		
Publication	N64	PC	PS
CNET Gamecenter	7/10	7/10	8/10
Computer Gaming World	N/A	2.5/5	N/A
Electronic Gaming Monthly	5.125/10	N/A	8.625/10
Game Informer	5.75/10	N/A	6.5/10
GameFan	86%	N/A	89%
GamePro	3.5/5	4/5	4.5/5
GameRevolution	D	N/A	A−
GameSpot	4.8/10	7.6/10	7.9/10
IGN	5.4/10	7/10	9.2/10
Next Generation	N/A	N/A	4/5
Nintendo Power	7.8/10	N/A	N/A
Official U.S. PlayStation Magazine	N/A	N/A	4.5/5
PC Accelerator	N/A	7/10	N/A
PC Gamer (US)	N/A	67%	N/A
The Cincinnati Enquirer	N/A	N/A	3/4

The PlayStation and PC versions received favorable reviews. In contrast, the Nintendo 64 version received mixed reviews, according to the review aggregation website GameRankings. Next Generation said of the former console version, "there's nothing particularly new in Triple Play 2000, but EA Sports has still presented us with a complete game that's a lot of fun to play and watch. If you're thinking of picking up a baseball game for PlayStation, this is the best choice."

Mark Kanarick of AllGame gave the PlayStation version four-and-a-half stars out of five, calling it "an excellent addition to any baseball or sports fan's collection." Brad Cook gave the PC version three-and-a-half stars out of five, saying, "Overall, Triple Play 2000 is kind of like a well-hit ball which reaches the warning track but falls into the arms of the center fielder right in front of the wall. The swing was sweet, but there just wasn't enough juice for a home run." However, Scott Alan Marriott gave the Nintendo 64 version two-and-a-half stars out of five, saying that it "doesn't offer anything to distinguish itself from the current crop of baseball games, other than having a very uneven frame rate and suspect controls." Jonah Falcon of Computer Games Strategy Plus gave the PC version two-and-a-half stars out of five, calling it "a step back in certain ways from Triple Play 99, but in a larger view it's a step forward."
