= MLB 2002 =

2001 video game

- Center fielder Andruw Jones of the Atlanta Braves featured on the cover.
- Developer: 989 Sports
- Publisher: Sony Computer Entertainment America
- Series: MLB
- Platform: PlayStation
- Release: NA: May 8, 2001
- Genre: Sports (baseball)
- Modes: Single-player, multiplayer

MLB 2002 is a 2001 baseball video game developed by 989 Sports and published by Sony Computer Entertainment America for the PlayStation. The cover athlete is center fielder Andruw Jones of the Atlanta Braves. Vin Scully is the play-by-play announcer with Dave Campbell on color commentary.

The game was preceded by MLB 2001 and succeeded by MLB 2003.

== Reception ==
Reception

Aggregate score
| Aggregator | Score |
|---|---|
| Metacritic | 76/100 |

Review scores
| Publication | Score |
|---|---|
| Electronic Gaming Monthly | 6.17/10 (Note: In Electronic Gaming Monthly's review of the game, one critic gave it 5.5/10, and the rest gave it each a score of 6.5/10.) |
| EP Daily | 8/10 |
| Game Informer | 6/10 |
| GameSpot | 8.5/10 |
| Official U.S. PlayStation Magazine | 2/5 |
| PlayStation: The Official Magazine | 3/10 |
| The Cincinnati Enquirer | 4/5 |

The game received "generally favorable reviews" according to the review aggregation website Metacritic. GamePro said of the game, "Surprisingly, 989 has strengthened MLB's baseball simulation, so gamers need to take that into consideration when deciding who to back in the PlayStation world series." (Note: GamePro gave the game two 3.5/5 scores for graphics and fun factor, and two 4/5 scores for sound and control.)
