= Baseball Advance =

2002 video game

- North American packaging artwork
- Developer: Smilebit
- Publishers: JP: Sega; NA: THQ
- Director: Takaya Segawa
- Designers: Tomoko Hasegawa; Noboru Yoshizawa
- Composer: Teruhiko Nakagawa
- Platform: Game Boy Advance
- Release: NA: March 19, 2002; JP: August 8, 2002
- Genre: Sports
- Mode: Single-player

Baseball Advance (released in Japan as Greatest Nine) is a sports game for the Nintendo Game Boy Advance, developed by Smilebit and released by THQ in March 2002. It was generally praised by critics upon its release. The game is the final entry in the Greatest Nine series.

== Game mechanics ==
=== Game modes ===
There are four modes of games available.

- "Exhibition" - One game of baseball. The player chooses a Major League Baseball team to play as, and may also select the opposing team played by the computer. The player can choose the number of innings in the match as well as other factors.
- "Season" - The player chooses one team and plays one season of baseball controlling that team. The season is supposed to be 2001, and the draw of every team as well as the All-Star Game is matched up exactly with each team's draw during the 2001 season. Also, in season mode, records set in baseball history for seasons and single games are listed, and if the player's team breaks one, the new record is listed as being set in 2001. If the player's team end up in the top four, it will go to the playoffs to the World Series.
- Playoffs - The player chooses a team and plays the playoffs to the World Series. The other teams are randomly chosen.
- All-Star Game - The player plays an All-Star Game with the selections from the 2001 team.

=== Playing Fields ===
All thirty teams from the Major League are available for selection. Only four stadiums (Safeco Field, Wrigley Field, Fenway Park and Pacific Bell Park) are available within the game, and all teams have one of these as their home ground regardless of where they come from. A planned Sega-themed stadium was created but ultimately not included because it did not fit with the game's more serious tone.

=== Player statistics ===
All player statistics in Exhibition Mode, Playoffs and the All-Star Game are those of the 2001 season. However, in Season mode, their stats are completely dependent on the results of each game played, meaning that the player has control of them. The game keeps all player statistics, such as batting average, ERA, RBI, season strikeouts and more. The game also has a history of records for seasonal stats and single game stats which the player can break as well.

== Japanese Differences ==
The teams in the Japanese version are the Swallows, Giants, Baystars, Carp, Dragons, Tigers, Bufaloes, Hawks, Lions, Bluewave, Marines, and Fighters. It features four stadiums: Tokyo Dome, Hanshin Koshien Stadium, Seibu Dome, and Green Stadium Kobe. Additionally, the menu art, layout, and some of the music and sound effects have been changed.

== Reception ==
Baseball Advance was a runner-up for GameSpot's annual "Best Sports Game on Game Boy Advance" award, which went to Tony Hawk's Pro Skater 3.
