= World Series Baseball (1993 video game) =

1993 video game

- Genesis box art
- Developers: Game Gear; ITL; Genesis; BlueSky Software
- Publisher: Sega (Note: Released under the Sega Sports banner.)
- Producer: Wayne Townsend
- Designers: Chuck Osieja; Dana Christianson
- Series: World Series Baseball
- Platforms: Game Gear, Sega Genesis
- Release: Game Gear: NA: November 1993; Genesis: NA: April 1994
- Genre: Sports (baseball)
- Modes: Single-player, multiplayer

World Series Baseball is a 1993 baseball video game released by Sega for the Game Gear and Sega Genesis. It is the first game in the World Series Baseball series, and was followed by World Series Baseball '95 in 1994.

The game was a major advancement in Sega baseball games, in that it included licensed MLB players and teams (the first baseball video game to have both such licenses [previous baseball video games only had one license]; they are based on the rosters for the 1993 and 1994 MLB seasons), and relatively accurate gameplay.

The series concluded with World Series Baseball 2K3 on the PlayStation 2 and the Xbox. After that, Sega contracted with 2K Games to take over their sports game contracts, and the line continued as the Major League Baseball 2K franchise.

San Diego Padres broadcaster Jerry Coleman provides the play-by-play for the game.

== Reception ==
GamePro gave the Genesis version a rave review, calling it "arguably the best baseball cart ever." They praised the use of real life teams, players, and stadiums, the accurate graphical recreation of the stadiums, the catcher's-eye view of the action, and the generally impressive graphics.
