= MLB Pennant Race =

1996 baseball video game

- Developer: Sony Interactive Studios America
- Publisher: Sony Computer Entertainment
- Programmers: Scott Murray; Scott Meenahan; David Saito; David Weeks
- Artists: David Estus; Steve Mitchell; Katy Roe
- Composers: Rex Baca; Joe Hight; Joel Copen
- Platform: PlayStation
- Release: NA: October 14, 1996
- Genre: Sports (baseball)
- Modes: Single-player, multiplayer

MLB Pennant Race is a baseball video game developed by Sony Interactive Studios America and published by Sony Computer Entertainment for the PlayStation. The game takes place during the 1996 Major League Baseball season; rosters and statistics are accurate as of the 1995 Major League Baseball season. The game was followed by the 989 Sports Major League Baseball series as well as the MLB: The Show franchise.

== Reception ==
Reception

Aggregate score
Aggregator	Score
GameRankings	74%

Review scores
Publication	Score
Electronic Gaming Monthly	8.25/10
GameSpot	7/10
IGN	5/10
Next Generation	2/5

MLB Pennant Race experienced exceptionally long delays, and some critics felt that it greatly suffered as a result, being a game with 1995 stats released when the 1996 MLB season was over. Other common criticisms were the slowness of the games and scorekeeper bugs such as counting swung-on strikes as balls. However, reviewers complimented the large selection of options and modes and the easy, accurate batting interface and controls. Opinions varied concerning the graphics; Hugh Sterbakov of GameSpot said they were excellent, a reviewer for Next Generation said they fell short of the competition, and Air Hendrix of GamePro said he personally felt they were not as good as polygonal graphics, but that they were done well for what they were and that those who like 2D graphics would enjoy them. Overall opinions of the game also varied. Todd Mowatt of Electronic Gaming Monthly said it was "a lot of fun to play", while his co-reviewer Joe Rybicki found it lacking and said gamers should rent it first. The reviewer for Next Generation concluded that its late release and inferior gameplay and graphics compared to the competition made it not worth getting. IGN criticized the game as being dated, specifically interface elements such as the batting cursor. Sterbakov said it was a mixed bag, but that some players would find its good points appealing and be able to overlook its negative points. Air Hendrix said it was an overall solid game, but beaten out by Triple Play '97.

== See also ==
- ESPN Baseball Tonight, Sony's predecessor for 16-bit consoles
- 989 Sports Major League Baseball series, Sony's successor for PlayStation
