= Triple Play 2002 =

2002 video game

- North American PlayStation 2 cover art
- Developer: Pandemic Studios
- Publisher: EA Sports
- Series: Triple Play
- Platforms: PlayStation 2, Xbox
- Release: PlayStation 2: NA: March 11, 2002; JP: September 26, 2002; Xbox: NA: March 18, 2002
- Genre: Sports
- Modes: Single player, multiplayer

Triple Play 2002 is a baseball sports game released for PlayStation 2 and Xbox in 2002. On the cover is Arizona Diamondbacks player Luis Gonzalez. It is the only game in the Triple Play series to be released on Xbox, and the last game in the series to date.

== Reception ==
Reception

Aggregate score
| Aggregator | Score | |
| Aggregator | PS2 | Xbox |
|---|---|---|
| Metacritic | 65/100 | 64/100 |

Review scores
| Publication | Score | |
| Publication | PS2 | Xbox |
|---|---|---|
| AllGame | 2/5 | 2/5 |
| Electronic Gaming Monthly | 3.5/10 | 4.67/10 |
| Famitsu | 26/40 | N/A |
| Game Informer | 6.75/10 | 4/10 |
| GamePro | 3/5 | 3.5/5 |
| GameRevolution | B− | B− |
| GameSpot | 8.6/10 | 8.6/10 |
| GameSpy | 77% | (mixed) |
| GameZone | 8.8/10 | 7/10 |
| IGN | 5.9/10 | 3.8/10 |
| Official U.S. PlayStation Magazine | 2/5 | N/A |
| Official Xbox Magazine (US) | N/A | 6/10 |

The game received "mixed" reviews on both platforms, according to the review aggregation website Metacritic. In Japan, where the PS2 version was ported under the name Major League Baseball Triple Play 2002 (メジャーリーグべースボール トリプルプレイ2002, Mejā Rīgu Bēsubōru Toripuru Purei 2002) on September 26, 2002, Famitsu gave it a score of 26 out of 40.
