= MLB 2006 =

2005 video game

- Developer: San Diego Studio (Note: Developed under the 989 Sports name)
- Publisher: Sony Computer Entertainment America (Note: Published under the 989 Sports label)
- Directors: Scott Rohde; David Ortiz
- Producers: Chris Cutliff; Chris Gill; Jody Kelsey
- Designers: Kolbe Launchbaugh; Ed Brady
- Programmer: Tim Monk
- Artist: Brad Pollard
- Composer: Chris Stevens
- Series: MLB
- Platforms: PlayStation 2, PlayStation Portable
- Release: PlayStation 2: NA: March 8, 2005; PlayStation Portable: NA: April 14, 2005
- Genre: Sports (baseball)
- Modes: Single-player, multiplayer

MLB 2006 is a baseball video game developed by San Diego Studio under the 989 Sports name and published by Sony Computer Entertainment under the 989 Sports label for the PlayStation 2 on March 8, 2005. A PlayStation Portable version, simply titled MLB, was released in April 2005. Vladimir Guerrero of the Los Angeles Angels of Anaheim was featured on the cover.

The game was preceded by MLB 2005 and was the last game in the 989 MLB series before MLB games from SCEA started being credited to San Diego Studio under the MLB: The Show series in 2006.

== Gameplay ==
MLB 2006 offers a baseball simulation featuring all 30 Major League Baseball teams, authentic stadiums, and nearly 1,200 real players. The game includes multiple offline modes such as exhibition, season, career, franchise, and home run derby, as well as online options for tournaments and roster updates. Players can create custom athletes, even importing faces via an EyeToy camera. The season mode allows players to manage lineups, trades, and drafts while playing through a full schedule, including the All-Star Game and playoffs. Career mode focuses on a single player's journey from the minors to the majors, with performance-based promotions and contract negotiations. Franchise mode expands management responsibilities to include scouting, staff hiring, stadium upgrades, marketing, and budget control. Hits and fielding outcomes vary naturally, with bobbled balls, ricochets, and dirt-stained uniforms. Pitching uses a release-point meter system for accuracy, while batting relies on timing, with optional "guess pitch" and "guess location" features to improve odds. Fielding and baserunning controls allow for dives, throws to specific bases, and preloaded steal attempts. Confidence and player attributes influence performance, and CPU opponents adapt to patterns. Games can be fully played, simulated inning-by-inning, or managed through a SportsCast interface resembling a board game. Online play supports up to 32-player tournaments and includes messaging tools for organizing matches. Commentary by Matt Vasgersian and Dave Campbell tracks the action closely, complemented by realistic stadium sounds and crowd reactions. Adjustable difficulty levels and tuning sliders let players customize gameplay.

== Reception ==
Reception

Aggregate score
Aggregator	Score	
Aggregator	PS2	PSP
Metacritic	81/100	80/100

Review scores
Publication	Score	
Publication	PS2	PSP
Electronic Gaming Monthly	6.83/10 (Note: Two critics of Electronic Gaming Monthly gave the PlayStation 2 version each a score of 7/10, and the other gave it 6.5/10.)	N/A
Game Informer	8.25/10	8/10
GameRevolution	B	N/A
GameSpot	8.6/10	8/10
GameSpy	4/5 stars	4/5 stars
GameZone	8.9/10	8.3/10
IGN	8.7/10	8/10
Official U.S. PlayStation Magazine	3.5/5 stars	3.5/5 stars
PlayStation: The Official Magazine	6.5/10	7.5/10
X-Play	4/5 stars	4/5 stars
Maxim	5/5 stars	N/A

The game received "favorable" reviews on both platforms according to the review aggregation website Metacritic. GamePro said that the PlayStation 2 version "follows up last year's comeback player of the year with control tweaks and makes its formidable Franchise mode even better." (Note: GamePro gave the PlayStation 2 version 4.5/5 for graphics, and three 4/5 scores for sound, control, and fun factor.) Some websites gave the same console version favorable reviews while it was still in development.
