= MLB 2004 =

2003 video game

- The cover featuring Los Angeles Dodgers' Shawn Green.
- Developer: San Diego Studio (Note: Developed under the 989 Sports name)
- Publisher: Sony Computer Entertainment (Note: Published under the 989 Sports label)
- Series: MLB
- Platforms: PlayStation, PlayStation 2
- Release: PlayStation 2: NA: March 11, 2003; JP: June 19, 2003; PlayStation: NA: April 29, 2003
- Genre: Sports (baseball)
- Modes: Single-player, multiplayer

MLB 2004 is a 2003 baseball video game developed by San Diego Studio under the 989 Sports name and published by Sony Computer Entertainment for the PlayStation 2. An abridged version for the PlayStation more faithful to its predecessors was released the same month. Unlike the earliest releases of baseball video games, such as Atari: Home Run, MLB 2004 maintained traditional aspects of baseball. The game included all of the classic baseball elements of "pitching, hitting, fielding and base running" while including the ability to develop a team and strategize. MLB's control over the game's core features and design allowed for consistent brand image and resonated with fans internationally. It was the first game in the MLB series to not be exclusive to North America, as it was released in Japan as MLB 2003 for the PlayStation 2 .

Vin Scully and Dave Campbell provide commentary for the game. On the cover is Los Angeles Dodgers player Shawn Green. The game includes accurate player rankings and statistics related to the baseball drafting process, allowing fans to tie their pre-existing baseball knowledge with video game entertainment. The MLB series prioritized accuracy when it came to representing the sport digitally. The players and stadium were brought to life through Sony's "meticulous attention to detail". A "majority of the attention was paid to making sure players looked realistic"; however, "there are some moments when the camera [wouldn't] display the best angle for the onscreen action". The game was preceded by MLB 2003 and succeeded by MLB 2005.

== Game Modes ==
There were a plethora of game modes included in MLB 2004 including Career, Home Run Derby, Fantasy Draft, Manager, Franchise and a new game mode, Spring Training, a mode that had not been featured in any other baseball titles.

Spring Training

The Spring Training mode featured the player assuming the role of a rookie player who has been invited to Spring Training by an MLB team. The goal is to acclimate as many points as possible through different tasks such as fielding balls at the player's specific position, getting hits, as well as stealing bases. The player has six games to try to make an impression and earn enough points to make it onto the actual MLB roster, though even after you make it on the roster you have to maintain the good performance or risk getting demoted to the minor leagues, off of the MLB roster.

Career Mode

The career mode allows players to select a particular player or team that they want to choose and try to have the best career/franchise possible over the span of 10 seasons. Another aspect of the game mode is that you are able to sign and trade players that are in the MLB. You are also in charge of a ‘farm club’ which is the minor league team that is under the team that you choose or choose to play for. One of the features that allows for less stress on the player is the fact that players are not in charge of dealing with the salary and staying under the salary cap as well as no free agency moves.

Franchise Mode

Franchise mode allows a player to control a computer-generated team of 11 players that the player is in charge of to face off against other teams that are in the league. The goal of the franchise mode is obviously to win the World Series, though for every home run, win, or set of wins that a player reaches they are able to earn points that can be used to purchase players that are better than the ones currently on the team to be better equipped to make a run and win the World Series.

== Gameplay ==
=== Hitting ===
Several new types of hitting were included in MLB 2004 which include the power swing and the contact swing. The hitter must move a bat cursor to make sure that they are able to make contact with the ball. There is a paddle that surround the cursor which highlights the area that is covered by a contact swing, and the smaller cursor which highlights the area covered by a power swing. The hitter is able to guess the location of the pitch, and if correct will increase the size of the cursor making the ball easier to hit.

== Reception ==
Reception

Aggregate score
Aggregator	Score	
Aggregator	PS	PS2
Metacritic	68/100	61/100

Review scores
Publication	Score	
Publication	PS	PS2
EP Daily	N/A	5.5/10
Famitsu	N/A	22/40
Game Informer	N/A	6.5/10
GameRevolution	N/A	C−
GameSpot	7.2/10	7/10
GameSpy	N/A	2/5
GameZone	8.2/10	7.3/10
IGN	N/A	4.9/10
Official U.S. PlayStation Magazine	3/5	3/5
X-Play	N/A	2/5

The game received "mixed or average reviews" on both platforms according to the review aggregation website Metacritic. In Japan, Famitsu gave the PlayStation 2 version a score of one six, one five, one six, and one five for a total of 22 out of 40. GamePro said of the PlayStation 2 version, "Deciding whether to spring for this game will boil down to individual preferences. Several other baseball games are far more polished, but if you're intrigued by MLB 2004's features, and if its pace and batting work for you, it's worth the price of admission." (Note: GamePro gave the PlayStation 2 version 3.5/5 each for graphics, sound, control, and fun factor.)
