= MLB 2003 =

2002 video game

- Barry Bonds of the San Francisco Giants featured on the cover.
- Developer: 989 Sports
- Publisher: Sony Computer Entertainment America
- Series: MLB
- Platform: PlayStation
- Release: NA: June 18, 2002
- Genre: Sports (baseball)
- Modes: Single-player, multiplayer

MLB 2003 is a 2002 baseball video game developed by 989 Sports and published by Sony Computer Entertainment for the PlayStation. San Francisco Giants player Barry Bonds was on the cover of the game.

The game was preceded by MLB 2002 and succeeded by MLB 2004.

== Reception ==
Reception

Aggregate score
Aggregator	Score
Metacritic	78/100

Review scores
Publication	Score
GameSpot	7.3/10
GameZone	8.5/10
Official U.S. PlayStation Magazine	4/5

The game received "generally favorable reviews" according to the review aggregation website Metacritic.
