= MLB (video game series) =

Baseball video game series

989 Sports Major League Baseball
- Logo used for the 2005 release of MLB 2006 on the PlayStation 2 and the PlayStation Portable.
- Genre: Sport
- Publisher: SCEA
- Platforms: PlayStation, PlayStation 2, Mobile phone, PlayStation Portable

MLB is a series of Major League Baseball video games by Sony Computer Entertainment published under their 989 Sports label. The series was originally developed by Sony Interactive Studios America, who later became 989 Studios until eventually merging into Sony Computer Entertainment America. Following the merge the games were released under the 989 Sports brand up until 2006. Following that, MLB games from SCEA were released by San Diego Studio under the MLB: The Show series.

== Games ==
Game	Details
MLB 98 Original release date(s): NA: July 1, 1997	Release years by system: 1997—PlayStation
MLB 98 Original release date(s): NA: July 1, 1997	Notes: Developed by Sony Interactive Studios America and published by Sony Computer Entertainment America; Bernie Williams of the New York Yankees was featured on the cover
MLB 99 Original release date(s): NA: March 31, 1998	Release years by system: 1998—PlayStation
MLB 99 Original release date(s): NA: March 31, 1998	Notes: Developed by Sony Interactive Studios America and published by Sony Computer Entertainment America; Vin Scully is the play-by-play announcer; no color commentary; Baltimore Orioles hitter Cal Ripken Jr. was featured on the cover
MLB 2000 Original release date(s): NA: February 28, 1999	Release years by system: 1999—PlayStation
MLB 2000 Original release date(s): NA: February 28, 1999	Notes: Developed and published by 989 Studios under the 989 Sports label; Again, Vin Scully is the play-by-play announcer; infielder Dave Campbell joins him for color commentary starting with this game; Anaheim Angels hitter Mo Vaughn was featured on the cover
MLB 2001 Original release date(s): NA: February 29, 2000	Release years by system: 2000—PlayStation
MLB 2001 Original release date(s): NA: February 29, 2000	Notes: Developed by Sony Computer Entertainment America and published under the 989 Sports label; Once again, Vin Scully is the play-by-play announcer with Dave Campbell on color commentary; Chipper Jones of the Atlanta Braves was featured on the cover
MLB 2002 Original release date(s): NA: May 7, 2001	Release years by system: 2001—PlayStation
MLB 2002 Original release date(s): NA: May 7, 2001	Notes: Developed by Sony Computer Entertainment America and published under the 989 Sports label; Yet again, Vin Scully is the play-by-play announcer with Dave Campbell on color commentary; Andruw Jones of the Atlanta Braves was featured on the cover
MLB 2003 Original release date(s): NA: June 17, 2002	Release years by system: 2002—PlayStation
MLB 2003 Original release date(s): NA: June 17, 2002	Notes: Developed by Sony Computer Entertainment America and published under the 989 Sports label; Once more, Vin Scully is the play-by-play announcer with Dave Campbell on color commentary; Barry Bonds of the San Francisco Giants was featured on the cover
MLB 2004 Original release date(s): NA: April 30, 2003; JP: June 19, 2003	Release years by system: 2003—PlayStation, PlayStation 2; 2004—Mobile phone
MLB 2004 Original release date(s): NA: April 30, 2003; JP: June 19, 2003	Notes: Known in Japan as MLB 2003; Developed by Sony Computer Entertainment America and published under the 989 Sports label. Developed and published by JAMDAT Mobile for the mobile phone; Yet again, Vin Scully is the play-by-play announcer with Dave Campbell on color commentary; Shawn Green of the Los Angeles Dodgers was featured on the cover
MLB 2005 Original release date(s): NA: March 16, 2004; JP: May 27, 2004	Release years by system: 2004—PlayStation, PlayStation 2
MLB 2005 Original release date(s): NA: March 16, 2004; JP: May 27, 2004	Notes: Known in Japan as MLB 2004; Developed by Sony Computer Entertainment America and published under the 989 Sports label; Last game with Vin Scully as the play-by-play announcer; Dave Campbell remains as color commentary; Eric Chavez of the Oakland Athletics was featured on the cover
MLB 2006 Original release date(s): NA: March 8, 2005	Release years by system: 2005—PlayStation 2, PlayStation Portable
MLB 2006 Original release date(s): NA: March 8, 2005	Notes: Known simply as MLB on the PlayStation Portable; Developed and published by Sony Computer Entertainment America; Vladimir Guerrero of the Los Angeles Angels of Anaheim was featured on the cover; Matt Vasgersian debuts as the play-by-play announcer, alongside Dave Campbell

== See also ==
- ESPN Baseball Tonight, Sony's 16-bit predecessor
- MLB Pennant Race, Sony's PlayStation predecessor to the 989 Sports baseball series
- MLB 06: The Show, Sony's successor to the 989 Sports baseball series
