= Triple Play (video game series) =

Baseball video game series by EA Sports

Triple Play is a series of video games based on Major League Baseball, published by EA Sports until their replacement by the MVP Baseball in 2003.

GameSpot stated that other simulations (for example, Sega's version) were superior to Triple Play, while GamePro greeted it as "the best baseball simulation so far". Electronic Gaming Monthly editors named Triple Play Gold Edition a runner-up for Genesis Game of the Year (behind Vectorman 2).

== Games ==
Game	Release date	Cover athlete (team)	Platforms
Triple Play 96	1995	N/A	Sega Genesis
Triple Play 97	Sep 24, 1996	Tony Gwynn (San Diego Padres)	PlayStation, Microsoft Windows
Triple Play 98	Jun 24, 1997	Brian Jordan (St. Louis Cardinals)	PlayStation, Microsoft Windows
Triple Play 99	Mar 10, 1998 (PS); May 30, 1998 (PC)	Alex Rodriguez (Seattle Mariners)	PlayStation, Microsoft Windows
Triple Play 2000	Mar 22, 1999 (N64); Mar 27, 1999 (PS); Apr 5, 1999 (PC)	Sammy Sosa (Chicago Cubs)	PlayStation, Nintendo 64, Microsoft Windows
Triple Play 2001	Mar 14, 2000 (PS); Mar 25, 2000 (PC); May 8, 2000 (GBC)	Mike Piazza (New York Mets)	PlayStation, Microsoft Windows, Game Boy Color
Triple Play Baseball	Mar 4, 2001 (PC); Mar 13, 2001 (PS, PS2)	Jason Giambi (Oakland Athletics)	PlayStation, PlayStation 2, Microsoft Windows
Triple Play 2002	Mar 12, 2002	Luis Gonzalez (Arizona Diamondbacks)	Xbox, PlayStation 2

All of the games contained the rosters and schedules of the beginning of the season of the year before the one described in the name except for Triple Play 2002. For example, Triple Play 2001 contained the rosters and schedules of the 2000 season, and Triple Play Baseball (without a year) contained the rosters and schedules for 2001. This is a result of the tradition of listing the year the series ends in, basketball, football and hockey ending in a different year from when they started. Baseball is the only exception, as it begins in March and ends in October of the same year.

The games were produced primarily for the PlayStation console, but also saw release on the PC and the Game Boy Color.

== See also ==
- MVP Baseball (video game series)
