= MLB 2005 =

2004 video game

- Developer: San Diego Studio (Note: Developed under the 989 Sports name)
- Publisher: Sony Computer Entertainment (Note: Published under the 989 Sports label)
- Series: MLB
- Platforms: PlayStation, PlayStation 2
- Release: PlayStation 2: NA: March 16, 2004; JP: May 27, 2004; PlayStation: NA: March 16, 2004
- Genre: Sports (baseball)
- Modes: Single-player, multiplayer

MLB 2005 is a 2004 baseball video game developed by San Diego Studio under the 989 Sports name and published by Sony Computer Entertainment under the 989 Sports label for the PlayStation and PlayStation 2. Eric Chavez of the Oakland Athletics was featured on the cover. The latter console version was released in Japan as MLB 2004 on May 27, 2004.

The game was preceded by MLB 2004 and succeeded by MLB 2006.

== Reception ==
Reception

Aggregate score
Aggregator	Score	
Aggregator	PS	PS2
Metacritic	53/100	78/100

Review scores
Publication	Score	
Publication	PS	PS2
Computer Games Magazine	N/A	A−
Electronic Gaming Monthly	N/A	7/10 (Note: Three critics of Electronic Gaming Monthly gave the PlayStation 2 version each a score of 7/10.)
Game Informer	N/A	8.5/10
GameRevolution	N/A	B−
GameSpot	N/A	7.9/10
GameSpy	N/A	3/5
GameZone	8.4/10	8.3/10
IGN	N/A	7.9/10
Official U.S. PlayStation Magazine	2.5/5	3.5/5
X-Play	N/A	4/5
Entertainment Weekly	N/A	B−

The PlayStation 2 version received "generally favorable reviews", while the PlayStation version received "mixed" reviews, according to the review aggregation website Metacritic. GamePro said of the PlayStation 2 version, "MVP Baseball 2004 remains the top overall pick this season, but MLB 2005 is an excellent alternative that will have strong appeal to diehard baseball fans. And it's great to see 989 Sports getting back in the game." (Note: GamePro gave the PlayStation 2 version two 4/5 scores for graphics and sound, and two 4.5/5 scores for control and fun factor.)
