= World Series Baseball '95 =

1994 video game

- Game Gear box art
- Developers: Game Gear; ITL; Genesis and 32X; BlueSky Software
- Publisher: Sega (Note: Released under the Sega Sports banner.)
- Designers: Chuck Osieja; Jay Panek; Dana Christianson
- Series: World Series Baseball
- Platforms: Game Gear, Sega Genesis, 32X
- Release: Game Gear: NA: October 1994; Genesis: NA: April 1995; 32X: NA: February 1996
- Genre: Sports (baseball)
- Modes: Single-player, multiplayer

World Series Baseball '95 is a 1994 baseball video game released by Sega for the Game Gear and Sega Genesis. A version for the 32X was released in 1996 under the name World Series Baseball Starring Deion Sanders.

== Gameplay ==
The game allows players to put teams involved in the 1994 Major League Baseball season in either exhibition, regular season, or playoff mode.

This video game also permits the player to create two customized teams with their choice of their favorite players (no luxury taxes unlike the modern baseball games). At the conclusion of the regular season there are awards given out for MVP, along with the Cy Young Award, the Triple Crown, amongst other awards that are dependent on regular season statistics. Also, players are selected to the All-Star Game purely based on statistics from the first half of the regular season. Unlocking a code allows a fictional team in exhibition mode. The players are asked how many innings they want to play and if they need a designated hitter prior to starting the game among other options like an optional digitized voice (for all the umpire's decisions) and the way that the game is viewed (front or back).

== Reception ==
World Series Baseball '95 was met with critical acclaim. Quick-Draw McGraw of GamePro applauded the Game Gear version for having "a ton of options that're usually seen only on 16-bit systems." He criticized the music and the limited vocabulary of the digitized voice, but nonetheless decreed it "one of the premiere sports games on the Game Gear." Writing for the same publication, Bacon was similarly enthusiastic about the Genesis version, citing the added modes and improved graphics over the original World Series Baseball. Electronic Gaming Monthly also gave the Genesis version a rave review, commenting that "The best baseball game of all time has been made better." Both their sports reviewers gave it a 9 out of 10. A reviewer for Next Generation similarly said that "The first WSB was the best baseball game of '94 and the '95 version looks even better." Particularly praising the comprehensive modes and content and the new multiplayer leagues, he gave it four out of five stars.

For the 32X version, Next Generation reviewed the 32X version of the game, rating it five stars out of five, and stated, "World Series '95 for the 32X isn't much better than its 16-bit counterpart, but it's easily the best baseball game available. This one won't disappoint." GamePro, however, criticized the release as being minimally improving over the Genesis version.

== See also ==
- World Series Baseball '96
