= World Series Baseball (1995 video game) =

- North American box art, featuring Mike Piazza
- Developer: Sega
- Publisher: Sega (Note: Released under the Sega Sports banner.)
- Director: Tetsuo Shinyu
- Producers: Chris Cutliff; Hirotsugu Kobayashi; Makoto Oshitani
- Designers: Tomoko Hasegawa; Yoshiaki Kitagawa
- Programmers: Ichirō Kasai; Kenichi Yamaguchi; Manabu Ishihara
- Artists: Hideaki Moriya; Kō Tanaka; Kōki Mogi
- Writer: Marc Sherrod
- Composers: Katsuyoshi Nitta; Miki Obata
- Series: World Series Baseball
- Platform: Sega Saturn
- Release: JP: 17 November 1995; NA/EU: November 1995 Game Gear; JP: 1 December 1995
- Genre: Sports (baseball)
- Modes: Single-player, multiplayer

World Series Baseball (Note: Also known as Hideo Nomo's World Series Baseball (Japanese: 野茂英雄ワールドシリーズベースボール, Hepburn: Nomo Hideo Wārudo Shirīzu Bēsubōru) in Japan.) is a 1995 baseball video game developed and published by Sega for the Sega Saturn.

== Gameplay ==
World Series Baseball features all 28 Major League Baseball teams and 672 players, with multiple gameplay modes including exhibition matches, a 162-game pennant race, playoffs, an All-Star game and a home run derby. The game also features a statistical database containing information about MLB players and their performances.

The Saturn version features four selectable camera perspectives, alongside instant replays and animated sequences depicting fielding, batting and home runs. Compared with Pro Yakyū Greatest Nine, the game introduced improvements to its presentation, including smoother player animations and revised gameplay systems.

== Development and release ==
The Saturn version of World Series Baseball was adapted from Sega's Japanese baseball game Pro Yakyū Greatest Nine, released in May 1995. According to German magazine MAN!AC, the Western adaptation increased pitching speeds and throwing distances compared with the Japanese original. It also introduced full-motion video footage of memorable postseason moments as a reward for winning the World Series. However, the Western release omitted features from the Japanese version, including its team editor, extensive statistical displays and multiple commentary styles.

In Japan, the Saturn version was released on 17 November 1995 under the title Hideo Nomo's World Series Baseball, prominently featuring Los Angeles Dodgers pitcher Hideo Nomo. Japanese promotional coverage highlighted the recreation of Nomo's distinctive tornado-style pitching motion, alongside the game's representation of American Major League Baseball teams and stadiums. A version for the Game Gear was released as Hideo Nomo's World Series Baseball on December 1, 1995.

== Reception ==
Reception

Review score
Publication	Score
Famitsu	4/10, 6/10, 6/10, 4/10 (Game Gear)

The Saturn version of World Series Baseball received positive reviews from European publications. British magazine Sega Saturn Magazine awarded it 81%, praising its baseball simulation and particularly its appeal to fans of the sport, while highlighting its two-player mode. French magazine CD Consoles gave the game its Gold award, praising its realism and detailed recreation of Major League Baseball stadiums.

German magazine MAN!AC awarded the game 85%, highlighting its extensive game modes and authentic representation of baseball. Italy's Console Mania scored it 82 out of 100, particularly praising its graphics, which received 94 points, although its sound received a lower score of 75. Spanish magazine Hobby Consolas awarded it 79 out of 100, praising its visual presentation while noting that baseball's limited popularity in Spain and the game's English-language commentary could make it less accessible to some players.

In Japan, Sega Saturn Magazine awarded Hideo Nomo's World Series Baseball an average score of 7.0 out of 10, with its three reviewers giving individual ratings of 8, 6 and 7. They praised improvements to the game's speed, controls and fielding mechanics compared with Greatest Nine, as well as its recreation of the atmosphere of American baseball. Criticisms included occasional inaccuracies in the English-language commentary, limited footage of Hideo Nomo and shortcomings in player animations. In the magazine's final reader rankings, subsequently compiled in the 2000 book Saturn no Game wa Sekai Ichi!, the game ranked 531st among 945 rated Sega Saturn titles, receiving an average reader score of 7.4651 out of 10.

World Series Baseball for Saturn won the 1995 Game Players award for Best Sports Game.

In 1996, Next Generation listed World Series Baseball as number 48 on their "Top 100 Games of All Time", commenting that, "This is the best-looking and best-playing baseball videogame of all time."

In its review of the 1996 sequel World Series Baseball II, GameSpot retrospectively praised the original game, describing it as "arguably the best sports game released for the Saturn" and characterizing its gameplay as nearly perfect. The publication considered the sequel an improvement primarily because of its expanded features.

=== Commercial performance ===
According to internal Sega of America sales data, World Series Baseball sold approximately 41,000 copies in the United States by the end of 1995. According to lifetime United States sales rankings published by Circana in September 2025, the game ranked ninth among Sega Saturn titles by sales revenue and sixteenth by units sold.
