= Triple Play 2001 =

2000 video game

- Developers: Treyarch (PC, PS); Handheld Games (GBC)
- Publishers: EA Sports; THQ (GBC)
- Series: Triple Play
- Platforms: PlayStation, Microsoft Windows, Game Boy Color
- Release: PlayStation: NA: March 14, 2000; Microsoft Windows: NA: March 24, 2000; Game Boy Color: NA: May 8, 2000
- Genre: Sports
- Modes: Single player, multiplayer

Triple Play 2001 is a 2000 baseball sports game released for the PlayStation, Microsoft Windows, and Game Boy Color.

Due to complaints about chopping frame rate issues from previous games, EA Sports was able to make the previous Triple Play game at a full 30 FPS but this game fell short and received heavy criticism for taking a step back. They also introduced classic players that player could control in the game. Players can play a single player game, a full season, playoffs, or the Home Run Derby. Team selection and transfers come under player control. Once again Jim Hughson and Buck Martinez provide the commentary. This game was not released on Nintendo 64 unlike the previous version, and it's the only Game Boy Color version to get a release date.

== Reception ==
Reception

Aggregate score
Aggregator	Score		
Aggregator	GBC	PC	PS
GameRankings	50%	58%	82%

Review scores
Publication	Score		
Publication	GBC	PC	PS
AllGame	2/5	2.5/5	4/5
CNET Gamecenter	4/10	6/10	8/10
Computer Games Strategy Plus	N/A	2/5	N/A
Computer Gaming World	N/A	1.5/5	N/A
Electronic Gaming Monthly	N/A	N/A	7.25/10 (Note: In Electronic Gaming Monthly's review of the PlayStation version, one critic gave it 9.5/10, two others gave it each a score of 5.5/10, and another gave it 8.5/10.)
EP Daily	N/A	5.5/10	7/10
Game Informer	4/10	N/A	8/10
GameFan	N/A	N/A	84% (Note: In GameFan's viewpoint of the PlayStation version, one critic gave it 89, and the other 78.)
GameSpot	3/10	4.6/10	8.2/10
GameSpy	N/A	69%	N/A
GameZone	N/A	7/10	N/A
IGN	4/10	6/10	7/10
Official U.S. PlayStation Magazine	N/A	N/A	5/5
PC Gamer (US)	N/A	52%	N/A

The PlayStation version received favorable reviews, while the PC and Game Boy Color versions received mixed reviews, according to the review aggregation website GameRankings. Air Hendrix of GamePro said of the PlayStation version, "With MLB 2001 still in spring training at press time, the jury is still out on PlayStation baseball this season. But if you're looking for fun, fast baseball and [you] aren't obsessed with realism, Triple drills another one over the fence." (Note: GamePro gave the PlayStation version three 4.5/5 scores for graphics, sound, and fun factor, and 4/5 for control.) Peter Olafson called the PC version "a solid contender. Take the extraneous stuff out, build up a few features and you could have a classic. As it is, you have a memorable experience, with a sleek interface, fun extras, and impressive attention to miscellaneous detail. A little more work, and Triple Play 2001 could have scored the pennant." (Note: GamePro gave the PC version 4.5/5 for graphics, 2/5 for sound and two 4/5 scores for control and fun factor.)

The game ranked 9th on NPD's list of Top-Selling PlayStation Games for the period of July 2 to 15 in 2000.
