= ESPN Major League Baseball (video game) =

2004 video game

- Developer: Blue Shift
- Publisher: Sega
- Platforms: Xbox, PlayStation 2
- Release: Xbox; April 6, 2004; PlayStation 2 May 4, 2004
- Genre: Sports
- Modes: Single player Multiplayer

ESPN Major League Baseball (ESPN MLB, also known as ESPN Major League Baseball 2K4) is a baseball game developed by Blue Shift and published by Sega and released in 2004 for the Xbox and PlayStation 2. It is the successor to World Series Baseball 2K3, and the only MLB-licensed Sega game to be released under the ESPN branding. Jason Giambi is the cover athlete for the game.

Reception

Aggregate score
Aggregator	Score
Metacritic	79/100 (PS2); 78/100 (Xbox)

Review scores
Publication	Score
GameRevolution	B
GameSpot	8.4/10 (PS2); 8.1/10 (Xbox)
IGN	8.4/10

The game was given generally positive reviews.
