= Triple Play 97 =

1996 computer game

- PlayStation cover art
- Developers: EA Canada; Synergistic Software (PC)
- Publisher: EA Sports
- Series: Triple Play
- Platforms: PlayStation, DOS, Windows
- Release: NA: August 1, 1996; JP: January 17, 1997
- Genre: Sports

Triple Play 97 is the second video game in the Triple Play series, published in 1996. The game's cover features Hall of Famer Tony Gwynn of the San Diego Padres.

== Development ==
The game was announced at E3 1996.

== Reception ==
Reception

Review scores
Publication	Score
AllGame	4/5
GameSpot	9/10
IGN	9/10

In 1998, PC Gamer declared it the 39th-best computer game ever released, and the editors called it "Triple Play 97 is fast, addictive, and, with its terrific presentation and two-man commentary, immerses the player in that authentic day-at-the-ballpark atmosphere like no other".

IGN praised the graphics.

== Reviews ==
- Electric Playground - September 10, 1996
- Entertainment Weekly - August 16, 1996
- Computer Gaming World - November 1996
- Computer Games Magazine - September 26, 1996
- PC Gamer - November 1996
