= World Series Baseball '96 =

1996 video game

- North American Genesis box art
- Developer: BlueSky Software
- Publisher: Sega (Note: Released under the Sega Sports banner.)
- Producer: Chris Smith
- Programmer: David Dentt
- Artist: Scott Seidel
- Composer: Sam Powell
- Series: World Series Baseball
- Platforms: Sega Genesis, Windows
- Release: Genesis: NA: August 1996; Windows: JP: September 20, 1996
- Genre: Sports (baseball)
- Modes: Single-player, multiplayer

World Series Baseball '96 is a 1996 baseball video game developed by BlueSky Software and published by Sega for the Sega Genesis.

== Gameplay ==
World Series Baseball '96 is a baseball game featuring Blue Sky's engine with updates for the players.

== Reception ==
Next Generation reviewed the Genesis version of the game, rating it four stars out of five, and stated that "What's certain is that Genesis isn't likely to have another baseball game of this quality ever. At the very least, this is a must have for baseball fans who are saddled with a Genesis and a long summer without basketball or football."

In the United States, the Mega Drive version of World Series Baseball '96 ranked tenth on a video game sales chart published in the November 1996 issue of Swedish magazine Super Play.

The Windows version was released in South Korea by SKC. Writing for the South Korean newspaper Electronic Times, Kim Jong-yoon praised the Windows version's smooth gameplay and straightforward controls. He noted that, unlike other baseball video games available at the time, the type of pitch thrown depended on how forcefully the player threw the ball. Kim particularly was impressed by the game's base-stealing mechanics.
