= Triple Play 99 =

1998 video game

- Developer: EA Canada
- Publisher: EA Sports
- Series: Triple Play
- Platforms: PlayStation, Microsoft Windows
- Release: NA: March 26, 1998; JP: November 12, 1998
- Genre: Sports
- Modes: Single-player, multiplayer

Triple Play 99 (TP99) is a baseball video game published by EA Sports featuring Major League Baseball rosters current from January 15, 1998 and stats from the 1997 season. Seattle Mariners shortstop Alex Rodriguez is featured on the cover.

The game has all 30 Major League Baseball teams including the newly added Arizona Diamondbacks and Tampa Bay Devil Rays. Triple Play 99 adds 3D hardware support, a career mode, a manager mode and a league-wide draft.

== Gameplay ==
TP99 includes all of the real stadiums, including Bank One Ballpark and Tropicana Field, except for the Kingdome (Seattle Mariners), which no longer exists, and three secret stadiums.

Injuries are also included in TP99. Players can accidentally collide when trying to catch the ball and fall over. Players may unexpectedly have an injury while playing as well, and the game will require that the team bring in a substitute. Pitchers can also lose their stamina faster than normal, making things even tougher. The game does have a stamina meter, and also shows a count of how many pitches the pitcher has thrown, how many balls, strikes, hits, home runs allowed, and walks.

== Reception ==
Reception

Aggregate score
Aggregator	Score	
Aggregator	PC	PS
GameRankings	76%	70%

Review scores
Publication	Score	
Publication	PC	PS
AllGame	4.5/5	2.5/5
CNET Gamecenter	9/10	N/A
Computer Gaming World	2.5/5	N/A
Electronic Gaming Monthly	N/A	6.625/10
Famitsu	N/A	19/40
Game Informer	N/A	8.5/10
GameFan	N/A	88%
GameRevolution	N/A	B
GameSpot	8.3/10	7.2/10
IGN	5/10	7/10
Official U.S. PlayStation Magazine	N/A	2.5/5
PC Gamer (US)	63%	N/A

Triple Play 99 met with a wide range of opinions from critics. GameSpot considered it the premier simulation-style baseball game on the market, citing its exciting new player maneuvers, ingeniously designed difficulty modes to support all types of player, and attention to detail, while IGN said the pitching-and-batting interface is too simplistic to appeal to anyone but those who have never played a baseball video game before, and GamePro said the good-looking players and exciting gameplay are offset by issues with the fielding controls, A.I., and frame rate, making for a game which is overall enticing but not one of the top games in its genre. While critics agreed that the frame rate is below standard, they sharply varied on how much of a problem this was; GameSpot dismissed it as a minor graphical shortcoming, while GamePro said it is bad enough to interfere with the gameplay, though over time one can adjust to it, and all four reviewers in Electronic Gaming Monthly's review team instead said that it is a crippling flaw which turns an otherwise great video game into a middling experience. Kraig Kujawa, for example, commented that "This is like playing baseball in mud. The erratic frame-rate and choppy player animations make it difficult to field and judge pitching speeds (among other things). The intro, deep stats, features and sound (particularly the two-man commentary) are great, but it doesn't change the fact that this game isn't very fun to play."

The sharply varied overall judgments on the game were likewise unaffected by general consensuses that the stadiums look good, the camera impressively recreates the same view of the action one would get on a TV broadcast, and the announcer commentary is among the best in any sports video game. GameSpot noted that the announcers' comments include not only accurate play-by-play calls but funny stories, interesting facts about players and teams, and even fake ads, and remarked that the other stadium noises are impressive as well: "You can often hear, under the chatter of the announcers, a vendor in the crowd yelling that he has popcorn or a fan yelling in disgust about his favorite team's poor performance. Every once in a while you'll hear a stadium announcement about someone's lights being on in the parking lot or something. It's all of these little extras that make Triple Play 99 feel more like a baseball experience than just a game."

The PC version held a 76% on the review aggregation website GameRankings based on 11 reviews, and the PlayStation version held a 70% based on 10 reviews.
