= World Series Baseball 2K1 =

2000 video game

- North American box art, featuring Pedro Martinez
- Developer: WOW Entertainment
- Publisher: Sega (Note: Released under the Sega Sports banner.)
- Series: World Series Baseball
- Platform: Dreamcast
- Release: NA: July 25, 2000; JP: March 22, 2001
- Genre: Sports (baseball)
- Modes: Single-player, multiplayer

World Series Baseball 2K1 (Note: Japanese: ワールドシリーズ ベースボール 2K1, Hepburn: Wārudo Shirīzu Bēsubōru 2K1) is a 2000 baseball video game developed by WOW Entertainment and published by Sega for the Dreamcast.

== Gameplay ==
World Series Baseball 2K1 is a baseball simulation featuring all 30 Major League Baseball teams and their stadiums, with player rosters based on the 2000 season. The game includes exhibition matches, quick-start games, season play and postseason playoffs. Season mode allows players to compete in schedules of varying lengths, including a full 162-game season.

Players control batting, pitching and base running, with pitching mechanics allowing them to select different types of throws and adjust their placement. The game also includes a customisation mode in which players can modify team rosters, trade athletes and create fictional players with individually adjustable attributes and appearances. Player creation includes options for physical appearance, uniforms and equipment, such as batting gloves, protective guards and footwear.

== Development ==
Sega had announced that a World Series Baseball game would be a launch title for the Dreamcast's 1998 release. The game was subsequently released in Japan on 22 March 2001. Japanese promotional coverage placed particular emphasis on Japanese players competing in Major League Baseball, including Kazuhiro Sasaki, Hideo Nomo and Shigetoshi Hasegawa.

In a pre-release interview with GameSpot, Sega producer David Perkinson explained that World Series Baseball 2K1 used a modified version of the engine from its NAOMI arcade counterpart, incorporating extensive changes to stadium environments, player animations and gameplay systems. The developers sought to combine the accessibility of arcade baseball games with the strategic depth of simulations, drawing inspiration from earlier World Series Baseball titles on the Genesis and Saturn. Perkinson said the team aimed to condense a nine-inning baseball game into approximately 20–25 minutes while retaining its essential mechanics.

== Reception ==
Reception

Aggregate score
Aggregator	Score
Metacritic	48/100

Review scores
Publication	Score
CNET Gamecenter	3/10
Electronic Gaming Monthly	3.5/10 (Note: Three critics of Electronic Gaming Monthly gave the game each a score of 3/10, 5/10, and 2.5/10.)
Game Informer	5.75/10
GameFan	52% (Note: In GameFan's viewpoint of the game, one critic gave it a score of 49, and the other 54.)
GamePro	3.5/5
GameRevolution	D
GameSpot	4.9/10
GameSpy	6/10
IGN	5.5/10
Next Generation	1/5
The Cincinnati Enquirer	2.5/4
Maxim	2.5/5

The game received "generally unfavorable reviews" according to the review aggregation website Metacritic. Rob Smolka of NextGen said of the game, "If lifelike graphics are what you want, save yourself $60 and turn on ESPN; the gameplay isn't worth a dime."

American publication Official Dreamcast Magazine awarded the game 4 out of 10. Reviewer Rob Smolka praised its graphics but criticised the absence of manual fielding, cumbersome batting and pitching controls, and the overall lack of player control, describing it as one of the most disappointing Dreamcast games released. German magazine Video Games similarly praised the game's visual presentation but expressed reservations about its control system, particularly the pitching mechanics and limited fielding interaction.

In Japan, Dreamcast Magazine offered a more favourable assessment, awarding individual reviewer scores of 7, 8 and 8 out of 10. The reviewers praised the game's presentation of Major League Baseball, its customisation options and accessible gameplay, while acknowledging its simplified approach to fielding.

The game was a runner-up for GameSpot's annual "Most Disappointing Game" award among console games, which ultimately went to Shenmue. The staff called the former "lackluster" and noted that Sega was "well known for producing superior sports games".

According to PC Data, World Series Baseball 2K1 sold 350,000 units in 2000, and according to an NPD report, the game had some 415,487 copies in North America by March 2003.
