= World Series Baseball II =

1996 video game

- European Sega Saturn cover art featuring Fred McGriff
- Developer: Sega
- Publisher: Sega (Note: Released under the Sega Sports banner.)
- Series: World Series Baseball
- Platform: Sega Saturn
- Release: NA: August 24, 1996; EU: October 10, 1996; JP: October 25, 1996
- Genre: Sports (baseball)
- Modes: Single-player, multiplayer

World Series Baseball II is a 1996 baseball video game developed and published by Sega for the Sega Saturn.

== Gameplay ==
World Series Baseball II is a baseball game which includes all of the major league stadiums, and features arcade-style pitching. The game features all 28 Major League Baseball teams and their stadiums, with more than 700 players and statistical tracking. Its five principal game modes include exhibition matches, pennant races, playoffs, All-Star games and a home run derby. Players can also create rosters for the expansion Arizona Diamondbacks and Tampa Bay Devil Rays, which had not yet begun competing in Major League Baseball. The team editor allowed players to customise two teams, including player names, batting stances, pitching forms and uniform numbers. Created players' abilities were randomly determined using three selected attributes, with the three options being running, offence and defence.

Compared with its predecessor, the game introduced additional camera angles, including an Active camera that follows the action from the fielders' perspective. Other enhancements included smoother player animations, rain delays, player injuries, revised play-by-play commentary and an automatic fielding option.

== Development and release ==
In Japan, Sega promoted World Series Baseball II as the Major League Baseball counterpart to Greatest Nine '96, which had been released for the Sega Saturn in July 1996. Contemporary Japanese previews highlighted the inclusion of officially licensed American baseball teams and players, updated animations and expanded team-editing features. The Japanese version was released on 25 October 1996.

== Reception ==
World Series Baseball 2 ranked second on an American video game sales chart published in the November 1996 issue of Swedish magazine Super Play. In the December 1996 issue of Computer and Video Games, World Series Baseball II ranked second on the magazine's American multi-format sales chart, behind Nights into Dreams.

Next Generation reviewed the Saturn version of the game, rating it five stars out of five, and stated that "There's no baseball game that looks, plays, or feels as good as WSB II. The graphics are so crisp and clean that it makes the competitors look like 16-bit games. The two-player game is incredible and, while the one-player game may lack some sim options, the speed of play enables you to get through a season without becoming bored. A must for any baseball fan, WSB II is at the top of the year's baseball line-up."

European publications also gave the game positive reviews. British magazine Sega Saturn Magazine awarded it 87%, praising its selection of stadiums, variety of game modes and accessible gameplay. However, the reviewer considered batting somewhat dependent on luck and suggested that dedicated baseball enthusiasts might find its simulation lacking in depth. French magazine Joypad awarded it 90%, praising its recreation of Major League Baseball teams and players, as well as its animations and overall presentation.

German magazine MAN!AC awarded the game 85%, with reviewer James Weingaertner praising its expanded statistical features, stadium selection, weather effects and team editor. However, he criticised the unrealistic speed of outfielders and batted balls, while noting that the game retained its predecessor's ageing engine. Despite these shortcomings, he considered it a worthwhile improvement over the original.

In Japan, Sega Saturn Magazine gave World Series Baseball II an average score of 5.66 out of 10, with its three reviewers awarding it 7, 5 and 5. Although the reviewers acknowledged its variety of game modes and team-editing options, they criticised its lack of distinctive features and questioned its appeal to players unfamiliar with Major League Baseball. The game subsequently ranked 338th among 945 Sega Saturn titles in the magazine's final reader rankings, receiving an average score of 8.1739 out of 10.

== Reviews ==
- Electronic Gaming Monthly - Nov, 1996
- Saturn+
- Superjuegos
- Computer and Video Games
