= Jason Giambi =

American baseball player (born 1971)

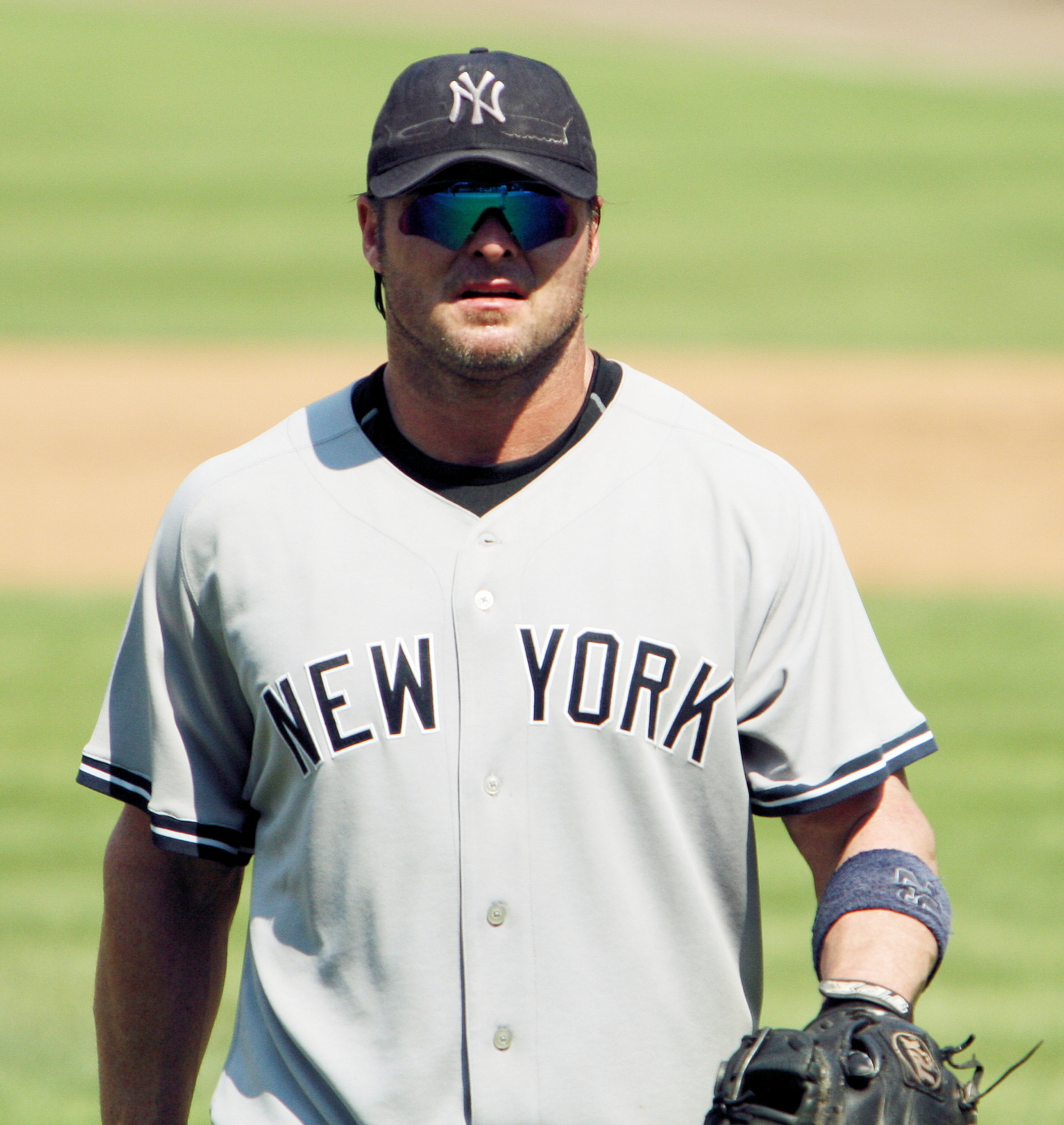
- Giambi with the New York Yankees in 2006
- First baseman / Designated hitter
- Born: January 8, 1971 (age 55); West Covina, California, U.S.
- Batted: Left Threw: Right

MLB debut
- May 8, 1995, for the Oakland Athletics

Last MLB appearance
- September 27, 2014, for the Cleveland Indians

MLB statistics
- Batting average: .277
- Hits: 2,010
- Home runs: 440
- Runs batted in: 1,441
- Stats at Baseball Reference

Teams
- Oakland Athletics (1995–2001); New York Yankees (2002–2008); Oakland Athletics (2009); Colorado Rockies (2009–2012); Cleveland Indians (2013–2014)

Career highlights and awards
- 5× All-Star (2000–2004); AL MVP (2000); 2× Silver Slugger Award (2001, 2002); AL Comeback Player of the Year (2005); Athletics Hall of Fame
Medals
Men's baseball
Representing United States
Pan American Games
Bronze medal – third place	1991 Havana	Team

Jason Gilbert Giambi (/dʒiˈɑːmbi/; born January 8, 1971) is an American former professional baseball first baseman and designated hitter. In his Major League Baseball (MLB) career, which began in 1995, Giambi played for the Oakland Athletics, New York Yankees, Colorado Rockies, and Cleveland Indians. He is the older brother of the late MLB player Jeremy Giambi.

Giambi was the American League (AL) MVP in 2000 while with the Athletics, and is a five-time All-Star, who led the AL in walks four times; in on-base percentage three times; and in doubles and slugging percentage once each; he also won the Silver Slugger Award twice. Giambi has publicly apologized for using performance-enhancing drugs during his career.

== Early life ==
Jason Gilbert Giambi was born on January 8, 1971, in West Covina, California. Giambi attended Sacred Heart Private Catholic School in Covina, California. He then attended South Hills High School in his native West Covina, where he was a three-sport standout. Giambi was on the baseball team, whose roster also included his brother Jeremy and three other future major league players: infielder Shawn Wooten, pitchers Aaron Small and Cory Lidle. He batted .386 during his three years of varsity baseball, leading his team to the state finals as a senior. He was voted MVP in both baseball and basketball. In American football, he was an All-League quarterback. Giambi was selected in the 43rd round (1,118th overall) by the Milwaukee Brewers during the 1989 MLB draft. He did not sign and went on to attend college.

== College career ==
Giambi attended Cal State Long Beach, where he played college baseball for the Long Beach State 49ers baseball team. Giambi played collegiate summer baseball for the Alaska Goldpanners, in the Alaska Baseball League.

== Professional career ==
=== Draft and minor leagues ===
The Oakland Athletics selected Giambi in the second round (58th overall) of the 1992 Major League Baseball draft. He started his career that year with the short-season Single-A Southern Oregon A's of the Northwest League, where he hit .317 in 13 games. He was a member of the fourth place United States national baseball team at the 1992 Olympics in Barcelona. The Athletics invited Giambi to spring training in 1993. He then spent the 1993 season playing for the Modesto A's, the Oakland Athletics' Single-A farm team. Giambi also played for the Huntsville Stars in the Southern League and the Kauai Emeralds in the Hawaii Winter Baseball league.

=== Oakland Athletics (1995–2001) ===
Giambi made his major league debut with the Athletics in 1995. Originally used occasionally as an outfielder, third baseman, and first baseman, Giambi assumed the fulltime first base job upon the trade of Mark McGwire to the St. Louis Cardinals in 1997. In 1997 Giambi established the team's longest hitting streak since it had moved to Oakland in 1968, at 25 games.

Giambi led the team in 1998 with 27 home runs, 110 runs batted in and a .295 batting average. In 1999, Giambi hit .315 with 33 homers, 105 walks (second in the league), and 123 RBIs (sixth). He came in eighth in MLB Most Valuable Player Award voting.

Giambi hit two home runs in Oakland's 2000 season opener on April 3, the first Athletics player to ever do so. In the 2000 season, he led the league in on-base percentage (.476; leading the majors) and walks (137; a personal high and still the most walks in the AL since 1991). He hit .333 (seventh in the league) with 43 homers (second; a career high), 137 RBIs (fourth; a career high), 108 runs (10th), and a .647 slugging percentage (third). Giambi narrowly won the American League Most Valuable Player Award over Frank Thomas.

His 2001 season was nearly identical. He led the league for the second year in a row in both on-base percentage (.477; a career best, and still the highest OBP in the AL since 1995) and walks (129). He also led the league in slugging percentage (.660; a career best), doubles (47; a career high), times on base (320), and extra base hits (87). He batted .342 (second in the American League; a career high) with 38 homers (seventh), 109 runs (sixth), and 120 RBIs (eighth). He was second in the league in intentional walks (24), the only time in his career that he was in the top 10 in this category. He finished a close second in MVP voting to Ichiro Suzuki, and won the Silver Slugger Award.

Both years, he led the Athletics to the postseason, both times losing in the American League Division Series to the New York Yankees in five games.

=== New York Yankees (2002–2008) ===
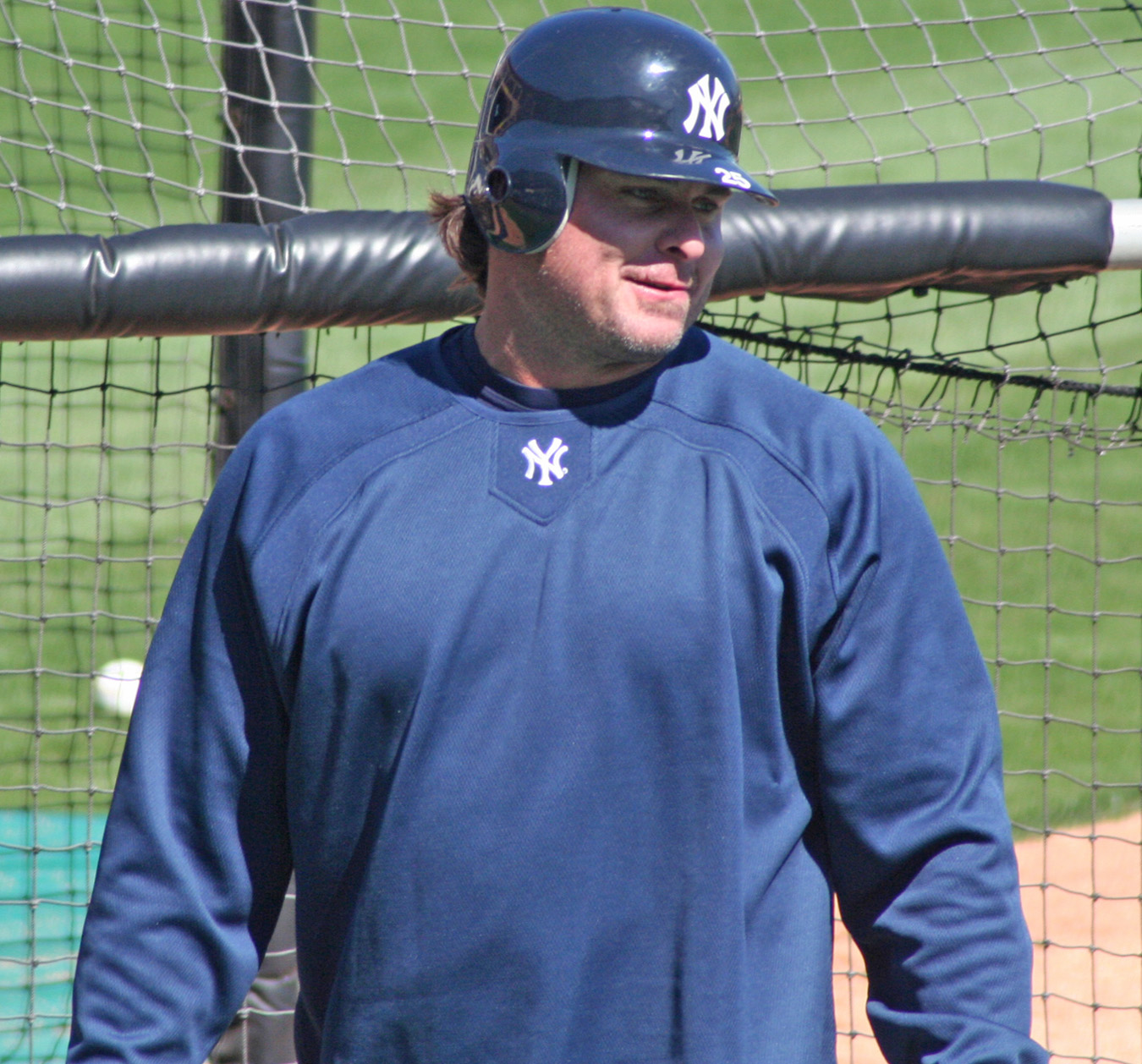
Giambi, as a member of the New York Yankees, during spring training in 2007

On December 13, 2001, Giambi signed a seven-year $120-million deal with the New York Yankees. In line with Yankees team rules, Giambi cut his long hair and shaved his goatee. The signing upset many Athletics fans, who felt betrayed by the departure of their team leader. Giambi became an object of the Athletics fans' wrath whenever New York visited Oakland. During a game on May 14, 2005, he was hit with a beer thrown by an unruly fan on his way back to the dugout.

Giambi continued slugging with New York in 2002. He led the league for the second consecutive year in times on base (300), had 109 walks (second), was third in the league with both a .435 OBP and 15 HBP, had 41 home runs (fourth), 120 runs (fourth; a career high), and a .598 slugging percentage (fourth), knocked in 122 runs (fifth), and batted .314 (sixth). He came in fifth in AL MVP voting, and again won the Silver Slugger Award. He also hit an "ultimate grand slam"—a walk-off grand slam against the Twins in a rain-soaked extra-inning game, that won that game 13–12.

Although his average dipped to .250 in 2003, he led the league in walks (129) for the third time in his career and in HBP (21) and percent of plate appearances that were walks (19.4%), maintained an extremely high on-base percentage (.412; third in the league), hit 41 home runs (fourth), and had 107 RBIs (eighth). He was also second in the major leagues in fly ball percentage (52.0%). He remained one of the most patient hitters in the majors. At the same time, he also led the league in strikeouts (140), the only season that he has even been in the top 10 in the league in that category. On July 30, 2004, test results confirmed that Giambi had a benign tumor, which placed him on the disabled list. He was treated for the tumor, and returned to the team for their game against the Kansas City Royals on September 14. That year, Giambi was voted in as the starting first baseman in the 2004 MLB All-Star Game despite finishing the year with a .208 batting average and just 12 home runs. Giambi's performance in 2004 was so poor that he was not added to the Yankees postseason roster.

Towards the middle of the 2005 season, Giambi saw a resurgence in his career. On July 31, he hit his 300th career home run off of Esteban Yan of the Los Angeles Angels of Anaheim. This was his 14th home run of the month, tying Mickey Mantle for the Yankee record for home runs in July. Giambi ended the 2005 season leading the major leagues in walk percentage (20.6%) and leading the American League in walks for the fourth time in his career (109), and in OBP for the third time in his career (.440, as well as in fly ball percentage (47.7%); second in MLB to Todd Helton), and had an OPS of .975, placing him fifth in the AL. He hit 32 homers (10th in the league), the seventh time in his career in which he has hit 30 or more, and was fourth in HBP (19) and at-bats per home run (13.0). Giambi was named the AL Comeback Player of the Year.

In 2006, Giambi was named the American League Player of the Month for April, hitting .344 with nine home runs and driving in 27 runs. However, he was left off the 2006 American League All-Star roster. He finished the season leading the majors in walk percentage (19.8%) and leading the league in % Pitches Taken (64.4), second in walks (110), HBP (16), and pitches seen per PA (4.37), fifth in at bats per home run (12.1), sixth in on-base percentage (.416), seventh in home runs (37) and slugging percentage (.558), eighth in intentional walks (12), and ninth in RBIs (113), despite playing in only 139 games (half of them at DH, and half at 1B) for the second year in a row. He performed the unusual feat of having as many RBIs as hits, and for the third time in his career had more walks than strikeouts. Giambi's numbers were down precipitously in the 2007 season due to an injury, in which he hit just .236 with 14 home runs and 39 RBIs. He played in just 83 games, 53 of which as a designated hitter. Giambi got off to a horrible start in the 2008 season, hitting below .200 for more than a month. However, by June, he had turned his season around and become one of the team's most productive players.

On September 3, 2008, Giambi walked into a bathroom door in his hotel room while in Florida before playing against the Tampa Bay Rays. The accident caused him to split his eyelid open but he played through the injury later that night and went 1-for-4 with one RBI, helping the Yankees win the second game of the series.

On September 21, 2008, Giambi recorded the final hit in Yankee Stadium, when he drove in Brett Gardner with an RBI single.

Giambi ended the season with a home run every 14.3 at-bats, beating out Alex Rodriguez to lead the team by a small margin. He was also one of only three players to hit a home run while pinch hitting in 2008, and the only one to do it twice. However, on November 4, 2008, the Yankees declined their option on Giambi for the 2009 season making him a free agent.

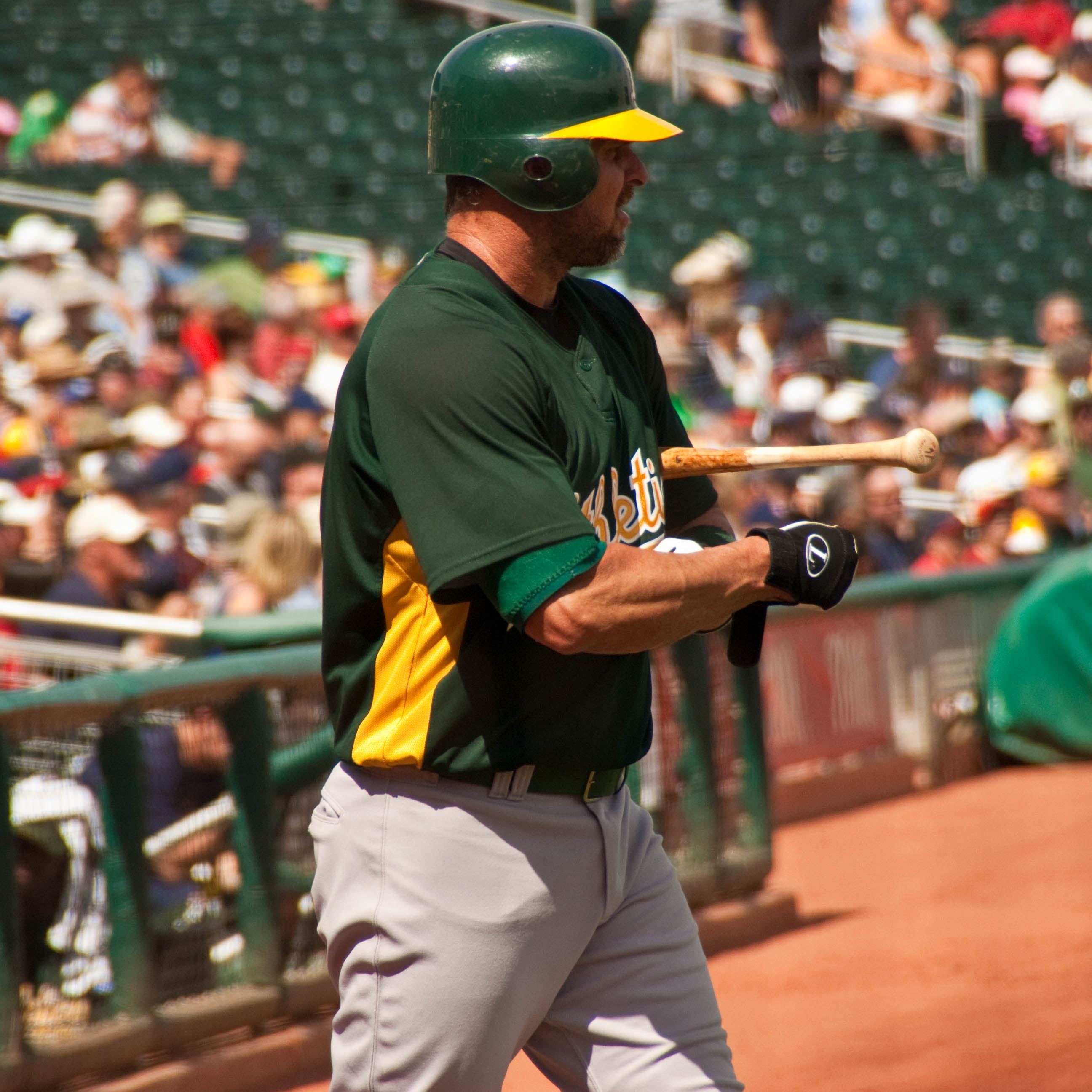
Giambi during his tenure with the Oakland Athletics in 2009 spring training

=== Second stint with the Athletics (2009) ===
On January 6, 2009, Giambi agreed to sign with the Oakland Athletics. He officially re-joined the A's the next day, and was given his old No. 16 jersey. Giambi hit his first home run since returning to the Athletics on April 25, 2009.

On May 23, 2009, Giambi hit his 400th career home run in an 8–7 loss to the Arizona Diamondbacks. He was placed on the disabled list on July 20. At the time, Giambi had the lowest batting average in the majors, and fourth-lowest slugging percentage in the American League. On August 7, 2009, he was released by the A's.

=== Colorado Rockies (2009–2012) ===
Looking for a veteran bat to help their playoff push, the Colorado Rockies agreed to a deal with Giambi on August 23, 2009. He was assigned to their AAA affiliate, the Colorado Springs Sky Sox. Giambi chose to wear the number 23 for his jersey number. His first RBI with the Rockies came in the form of a bases loaded walk in his first plate appearance on September 1, 2009, after being promoted to the club upon roster expansion earlier that day. That year, he had many clutch hits which kept the Rockies in contention for the National League Wild Card. He quickly became a fan favorite in Colorado.

On January 23, 2010, Giambi reached an agreement to return to the Rockies. On September 12, Giambi hit a walk-off home run against the Arizona Diamondbacks, extending the winning streak for the Rockies to 10 games.

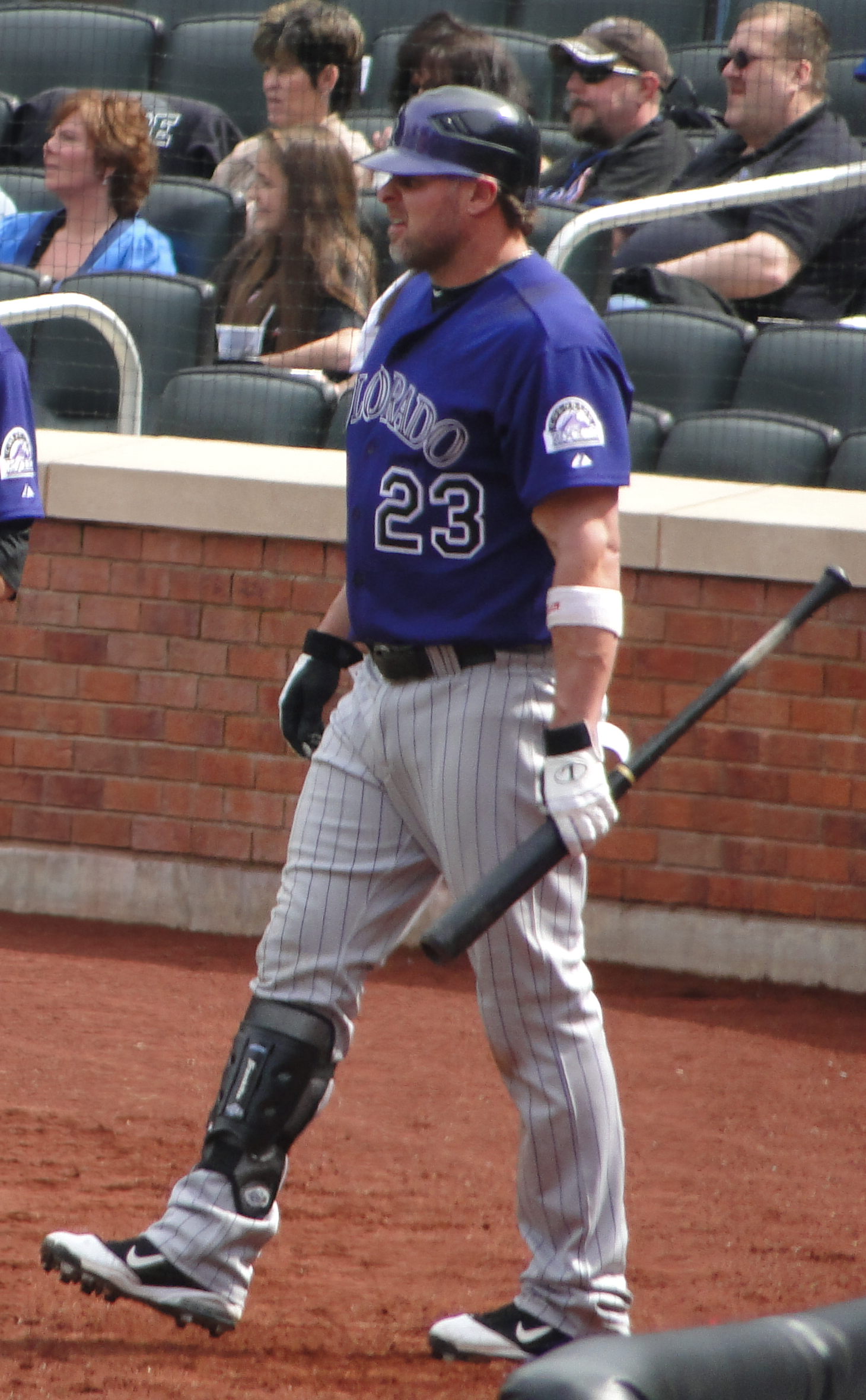
Giambi with the Colorado Rockies in 2011

The Colorado Rockies announced on January 17, 2011, a deal to put Giambi in the team's minor league organization with a spring training invite for the 2011 season. Giambi made the 2011 Opening Day roster out of spring training.

On May 19, 2011, against the Philadelphia Phillies, Giambi hit three home runs in one game, the first such game for him of his career. The three home runs came in his first three at-bats. Giambi is also the second oldest player to accomplish the feat; at age 41, Stan Musial was the oldest player to hit three home runs in one game on July 8, 1962.

Giambi became a free agent after the 2012 season and was a finalist for the Rockies major league managerial opening, which eventually went to Walt Weiss. Giambi was offered the position of Colorado's hitting coach but turned it down.

=== Cleveland Indians (2013–2014) ===
The Cleveland Indians signed Giambi to a minor league contract on February 9, 2013. Giambi made the Indians major league roster following spring training. On July 29, 2013, Giambi became the oldest player to hit a walk-off home run. He broke his own record for oldest player to hit a walk-off home run in a season saving win for the Indians against the White Sox on September 24, 2013.

Giambi was re-signed by the Indians on October 31, 2013, to a one-year minor league deal. The deal included an invitation to Spring Training. Giambi was hit by an Edwin Jackson pitch on March 7, 2014. This resulted in a broken rib, and Giambi missed the first 18 games of the season. He was activated on April 21.

On August 2, 2014, Giambi gave up his 25 jersey number to Jim Thome to have it unofficially retired by the Indians; Giambi switched his jersey number to 72 that day. On the jersey that he gave to Thome, Giambi put down a message to Thome saying "Jim, It was an honor to be the last person to wear your uniform number in Cleveland Indians history! – Jason Giambi" It was kept a secret from the fans, the players, Thome himself and his family, happening after Thome signed the one-day contract and threw out the first pitch.

On February 16, 2015, Giambi announced his retirement.

=== Awards ===
- 1999 Oakland Athletics Player of the Year
- 2000 Oakland Athletics Player of the Year
- 2000 AL Most Valuable Player
- 2000 Hutch Award
- 2001 Oakland Athletics Player of the Year
- 2001 Baseball America 1st-Team Major League All-Star 1B
- 2001 AL Silver Slugger Award (1B)
- 2002 Home Run Derby Winner
- 2002 Baseball America 2nd-Team Major League All-Star 1B
- 2002 AL Silver Slugger Award (1B)
- 2005 AL Comeback Player of the Year

=== BALCO scandal ===
Late in 2003, Giambi was named by FBI officers investigating the Bay Area Laboratory Co-operative (BALCO) as being one of the baseball players believed to have received anabolic steroids from trainer Greg Anderson.

In December 2004, the San Francisco Chronicle reported it had seen Giambi's 2003 grand jury testimony in the BALCO investigation. The newspaper said that in his testimony, Giambi admitted to using several different steroids during the off-seasons from 2001 to 2003, and injecting himself with human growth hormone during the 2003 season. In a press conference prior to the 2005 season, Giambi apologized publicly to the media and his fans, though he did not specifically state what for. The lawyer who illegally leaked the testimony later pleaded guilty, and was sentenced to 2 1/2 years in prison.

Giambi apologized again on May 16, 2007, this time specifically for using steroids, and urged others in the sport to do the same. "I was wrong for using that stuff", he told USA Today. "What we should have done a long time ago was stand up—players, ownership, everybody—and said, 'We made a mistake.'" When asked why he used steroids, Giambi responded: "Maybe one day I'll talk about it, but not now." Giambi did speak with George J. Mitchell, after being forced to do so by Bud Selig. Subsequently, in December 2007, the Mitchell Report included Giambi along with his brother Jeremy Giambi, who also admitted to using steroids during his career.

The prosecution in the Barry Bonds perjury case indicated they intended to call both Jason and Jeremy Giambi to testify against Bonds in his March 2009 trial.

== Personal life ==
Giambi married Kristian on February 2, 2002. His wife is the designer and owner of a lingerie and loungewear company called Brulee. Giambi is one of the owners of Casa Cielo (also owned by Scott Deskins of SCC Development in Austin, Texas) in Cabo San Lucas, Mexico. It is an 18,000-square-foot (1,700 m^{2}) home on top of the Pedregal sign. His co-owned property was put up for auction in 2019. Giambi's siblings include former major-leaguer Jeremy Giambi, who died in 2022, and a sister named Julie.

== Video game covers ==
Giambi has appeared as the featured athlete on the cover of several video games throughout his career.

Year	Game Title
2001	Triple Play Baseball
2002	World Series Baseball (Xbox)
2003	World Series Baseball 2K3
2004	ESPN Major League Baseball
2006	MLB Slugfest

Giambi has also been featured as a playable character in Backyard Baseball 2001 as well as Backyard Baseball 2003.

=== Other media ===
Giambi also appeared in The Bronx Is Burning, a television drama that debuted on ESPN in 2007, as a taxi cab driver.

== See also ==
- List of Major League Baseball career hits leaders
- List of Major League Baseball career home run leaders
- List of Major League Baseball career runs scored leaders
- List of Major League Baseball career runs batted in leaders
- List of Major League Baseball career on-base percentage leaders
- List of Major League Baseball career slugging percentage leaders
- List of Major League Baseball career OPS leaders
- List of Major League Baseball career times on base leaders
- List of Major League Baseball career extra base hits leaders
- List of Major League Baseball career strikeouts by batters leaders
- List of Major League Baseball career bases on balls leaders
- List of Major League Baseball annual doubles leaders
- List of Major League Baseball players named in the Mitchell Report
- List of Major League Baseball ultimate grand slams
- List of sportspeople sanctioned for doping offences

Awards and achievements
Preceded by Glenallen Hill; Manny Ramírez; Torii Hunter; Edgar Martínez; Travis Hafner; David Ortiz	American League Player of the Month; September 2000; May 2001; May 2002; June 2003; July 2005; April 2006	Succeeded by Manny Ramírez; Mike Sweeney; Paul Konerko; Magglio Ordóñez; Alex Rodriguez; Alex Rodriguez
