= Analog stick =

Input device for a video game controller

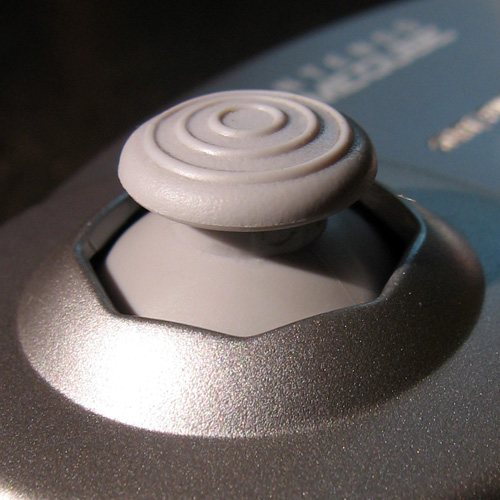
The GameCube controller analog stick

An analog stick (analogue stick in British English), also known as a control stick, thumbstick or joystick, is an input method designed for video games that translates thumb movement into directional control. It consists of a protruding stick mounted on a pivot, with movement registered through continuous electrical signals rather than discrete switches, allowing for greater nuance than traditional digital inputs.

Unlike D-pads, which rely on fixed electrical contacts, analog sticks typically use potentiometers to measure their position across a full range of motion. Many models allow the stick to be pressed down like a button, allowing users to execute commands without removing their thumb from the stick. Since its introduction, the analog stick has largely replaced the D-pad as the primary directional input in modern game controllers.

== Usage in video games ==
The initial prevalence of analog sticks was as peripherals for flight simulator games, to better reflect the subtleties of control required for such titles. It was during the fifth console generation that Nintendo announced it would integrate a small stick into its Nintendo 64 controller, a step which would pave the way for subsequent leading console manufacturers to follow suit.

An analog stick is often used to move some game object, usually the playable character. It may also be used to rotate the camera, usually around the character. The analog stick can serve a great variety of other functions, depending on the game. Today many analog sticks can also be pushed in like conventional face buttons of a controller, to allow for more functions. With the prevalence of analog sticks, the aforementioned limitations of the D-pad ceased to be an issue.

=== Dual analog sticks ===
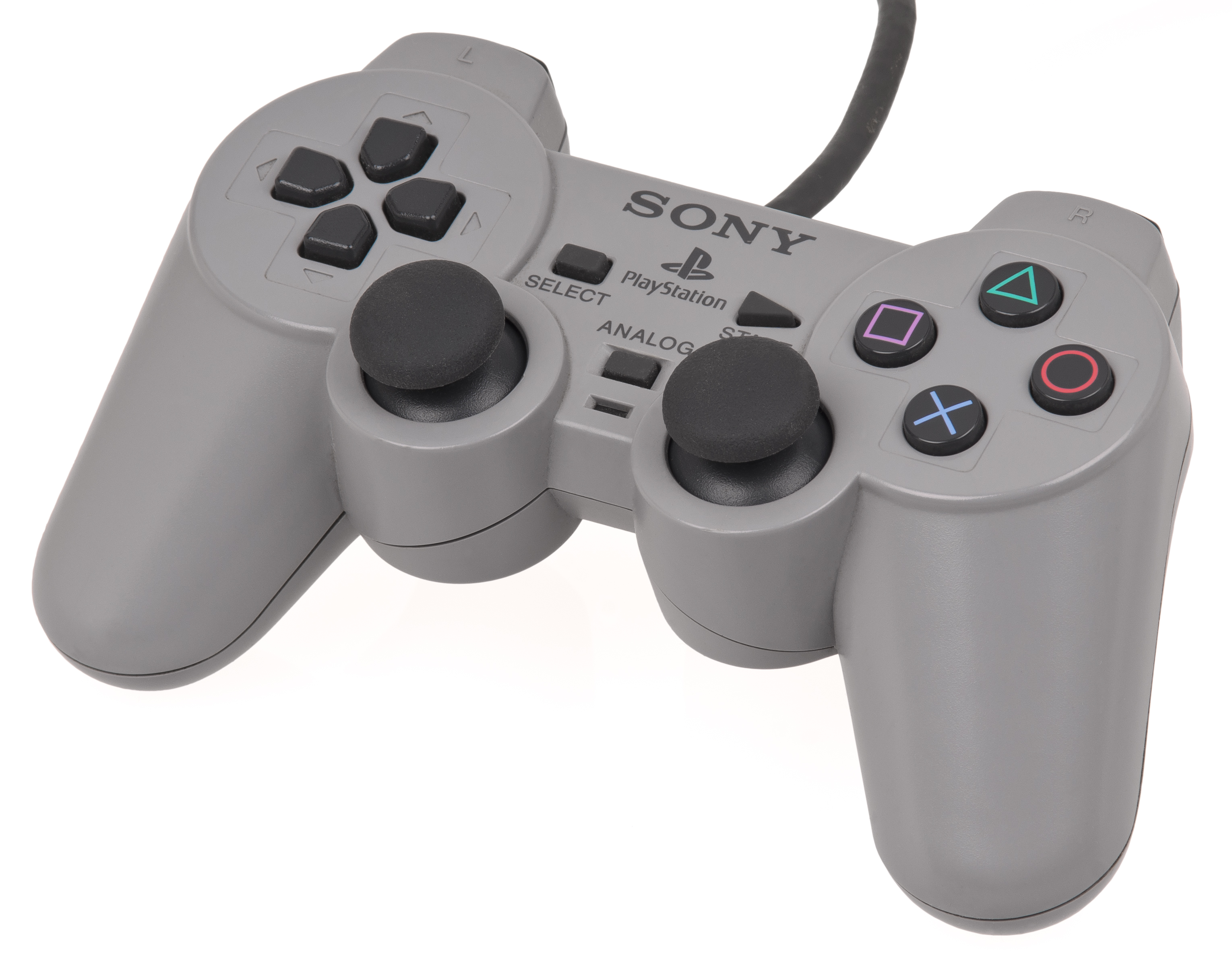
The Sony PlayStation DualShock (1997) features two analog sticks.

Two analog sticks offer greater functionality than a single stick. Importantly, it allows for the direction of a playable character to be controlled by one stick and the orientation of the camera by the other, allowing players to look one direction, while moving in another. Sony's Dual Analog and DualShock controllers, released in 1997 were the first to feature two sticks, and the design later earned a Technology & Engineering Emmy Award.

On some modern game controllers, the analog sticks are "staggered", such that the left stick is positioned to the upper left of the D-pad while the right stick is positioned to the lower left of the face buttons. The controllers of all Xbox consoles (Xbox controller, Xbox 360 controller and Xbox Wireless Controller), as well as controllers for Nintendo's GameCube, Switch and Switch 2 (GameCube controller, the dual Joy-Con and Joy-Con 2 Comfort Grip and the Switch and Switch 2 Pro Controller), utilize a staggered analog stick layout.

Other controllers instead have the two analog sticks in a symmetrical configuration with a D-pad on the left thumb position and face buttons at the right thumb position, with analog sticks below and closer to the center on both sides. Sony's PlayStation-series analog controllers—the Dual Analog Controller, DualShock, DualShock 2, Sixaxis, DualShock 3, DualShock 4 and DualSense—all use this configuration, with the remainder of the controller layout closely resembling the original digital PlayStation controller. The Classic Controller for the Wii also uses this configuration. The original configuration of the Wii U GamePad controller had twin analog "Circle Pads" positioned symmetrically above the D-pad and face buttons, but was reconfigured to have twin clickable analog sticks several months ahead of the system's planned launch. This setup also carried over to the Wii U Pro Controller.

With genres such as action, adventure games, platforming, and shooting, the left stick normally controls the character's movement while the second stick controls the camera. The use of a second analog stick alleviated problems in many earlier platform games, in which the camera was notorious for bad positioning. The right stick not only allows for camera control in third-person games, but is almost essential for most modern first-person shooters such as Halo, where it controls the player's gaze and aim, as opposed to the left stick, which controls where the player moves. In Namco's Katamari Damacy and its sequels, both analog sticks are used at once to control the player's character.

In spite of widespread adoption of dual analog sticks, a few modern video game systems are designed without a second analog stick, namely the Wii's standard controller (whose lone analog stick is implemented in the Wii Remote's Nunchuk attachment), Sony's PSP and Nintendo's 3DS. While the Wii's abovementioned supplemental Classic Controller accessory and its initial backwards compatibility support of the GameCube controller allow for dual-stick control schemes in certain games, the PSP's complete lack of a second analog stick and later the 3DS' initial lack of such feature have been criticized. Nintendo has since released an add-on for the 3DS that adds, among other things, a second analog "circle pad". The follow-up to the PSP, the PlayStation Vita, features dual analog sticks. It is the first handheld game console to do so. The New Nintendo 3DS line of systems added a second analog controller, known as the "C-Stick" to the right side of the device.

=== Neutral position and drifting ===
To operate properly, an analog stick must establish a neutral position, a special, unique position which the stick must maintain that the controller would interpret as an intentional cessation or absence of in-game movement. Ideally, this would be the stick's very center when it is not touched or moved. Whenever the controller is activated or the system it is connected to is powered on, the current position of its analog stick(s) become the established neutral position. If the analog stick is moved away from its center during a time while it is established, the neutral position would shift to some place away from the center of the stick, causing the controller to interpret the center motionless position of the stick as in-game movement, since it is not the neutral position as it should be. This phenomenon, commonly called drifting, causes undesired gameplay effects, depending on the current game's controls, such as constant movement of the player character in a single direction or the game camera being skewed towards one particular angle while the affected stick is unmoved, and can only be corrected by performing particular actions that would restore the affected analog stick's neutral position back to the center of the analog stick. For Nintendo controllers with analog sticks, this would involve holding down a certain combination of buttons while the affected analog sticks are untouched.

== History ==
=== Analog joysticks ===
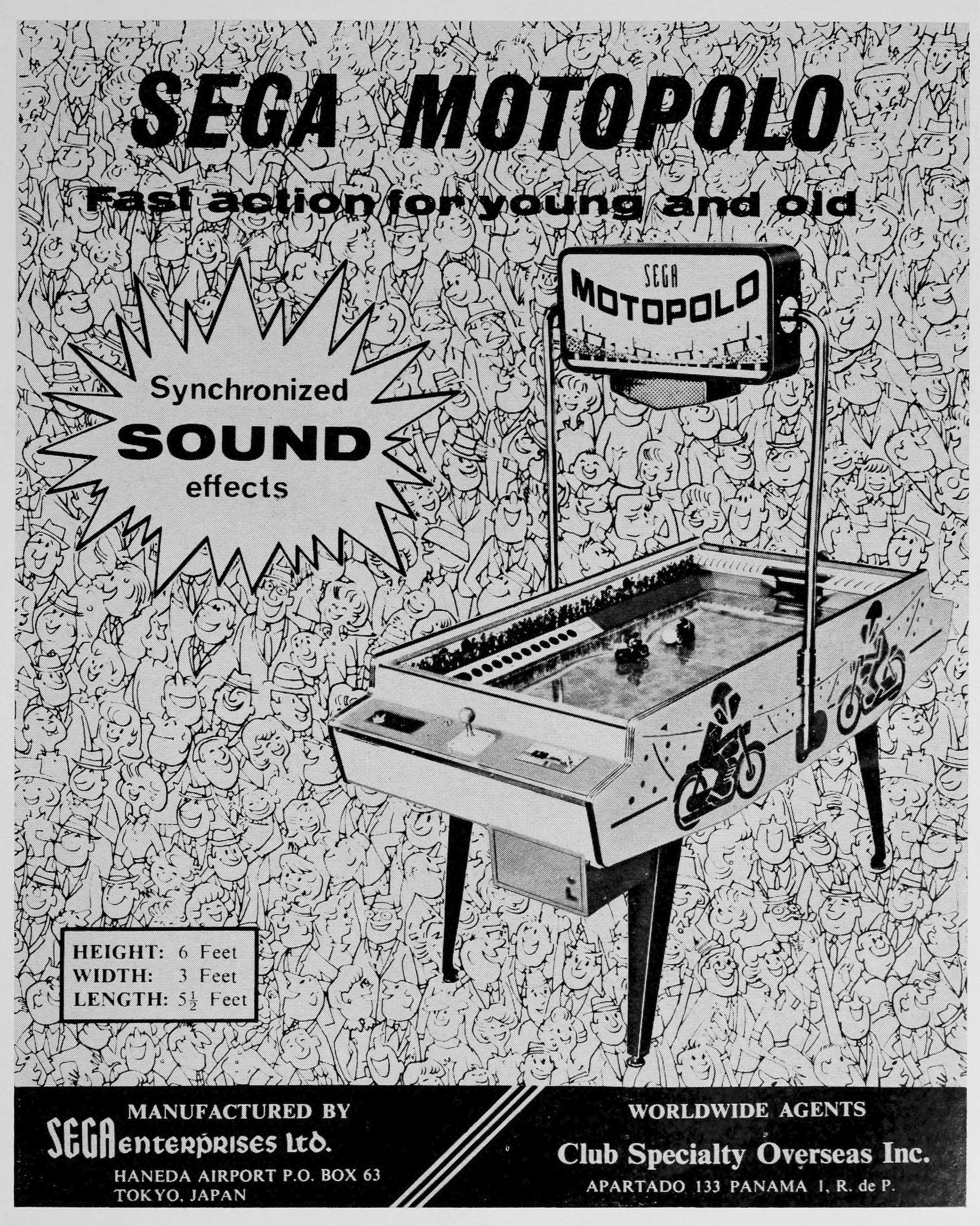
Sega's arcade electro-mechanical game MotoPolo (1968), the earliest game with analog joystick controls.

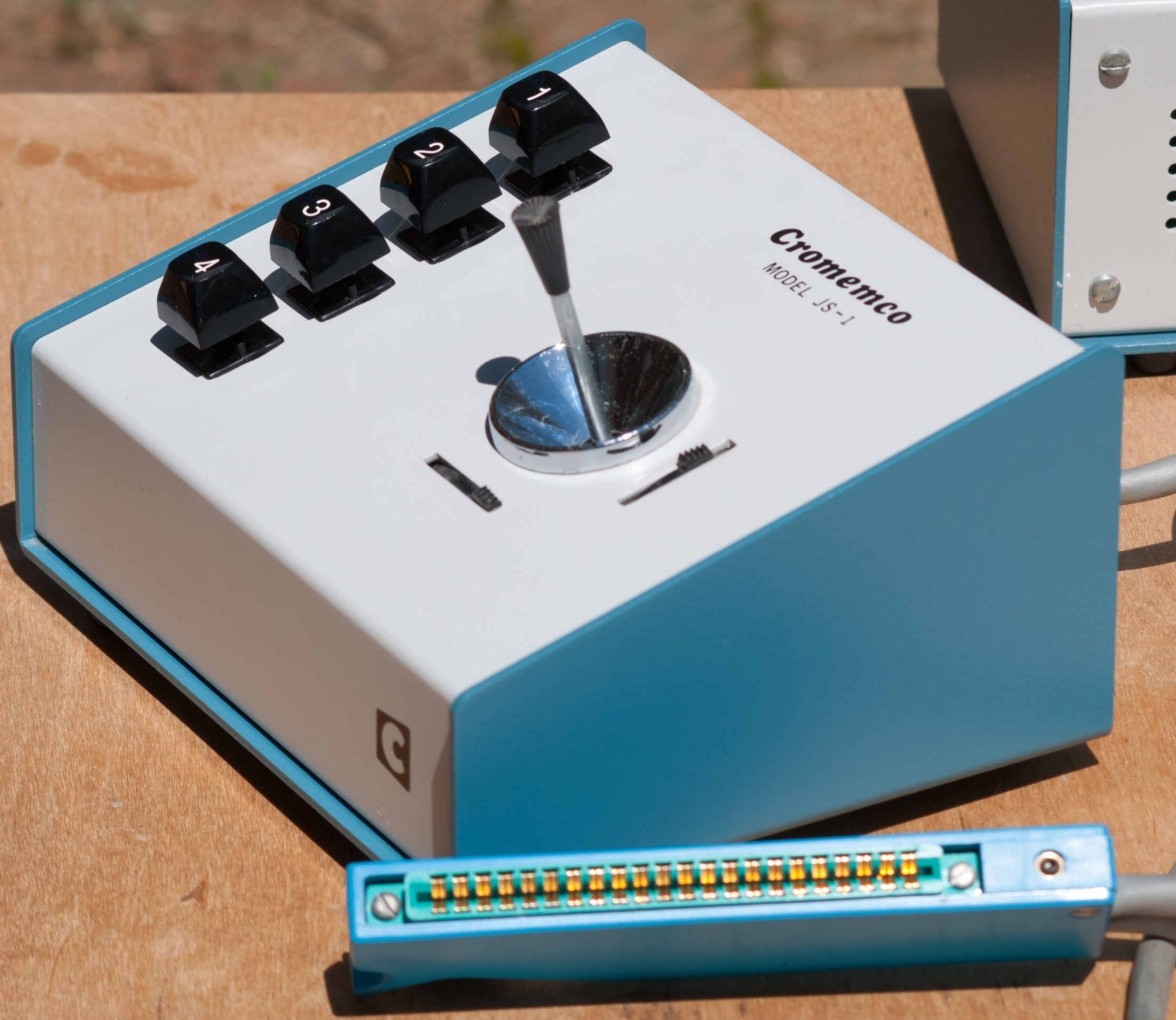
Cromemco JS-1 (1976), the first known analog joystick for microcomputers.

Sega's two-player arcade electro-mechanical game MotoPolo, released in early 1968, introduced joystick controllers, one for each player. They were essentially analog joysticks, using analog magnetic lever technology to move miniature motorbikes in any direction on the table.

Shortly after the introduction of the first microcomputers, Cromemco introduced a S-100 bus card containing an analog-to-digital converter, and shortly after in 1976, a card with two of these and an associated analog joystick, the JS-1. This is the first known example of such a device for a personal computer.

The first consumer games console which had analog joysticks was the Prinztronic/Acetronic/Interton series, launched in 1978. This system was widely cloned throughout Europe and available under several brand names. The 2 sticks each used a pair of potentiometers, they were not self-centering in most models but some, such as those of the Interton VC4000 models did self-center.

When the Apple II was released, it shipped with an paddle controller as a standard input, but these failed to meet FCC emissions guidelines and Apple Inc. was forced to stop selling them. This left hundreds of games unable to be used, and this problem was quickly rectified by 3rd party suppliers. Not long after, these same companies began producing analog joysticks for the system, but these took some time to become popular. Analog controllers including joysticks were the norm on PCs with game port during the 1980s and 1990s.

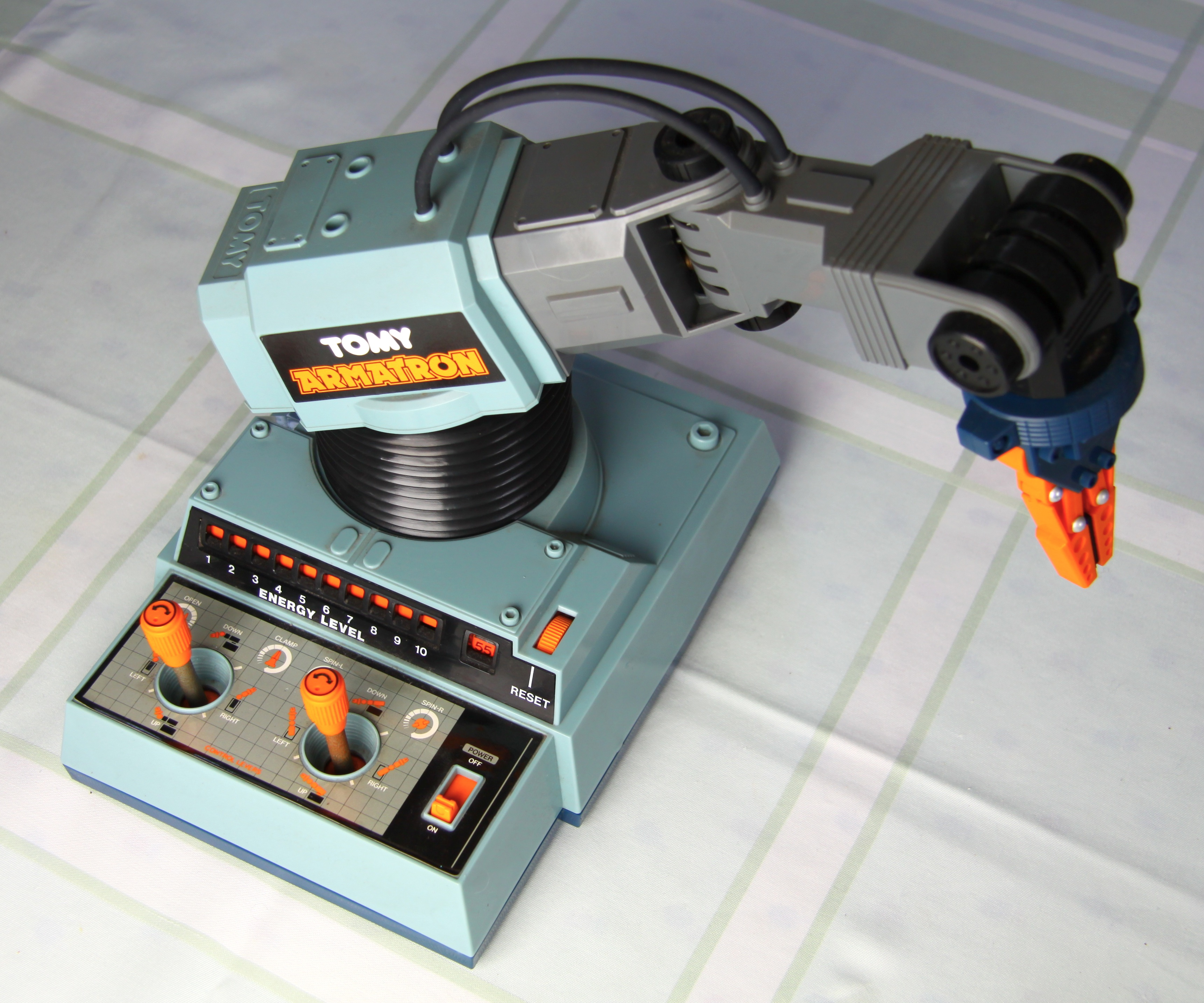
Tomy's Armatron (1982), a toy robot arm moved by dual analog joysticks.

The Armatron, a toy robot arm introduced by Tomy in 1982, was moved by dual analog control joysticks.

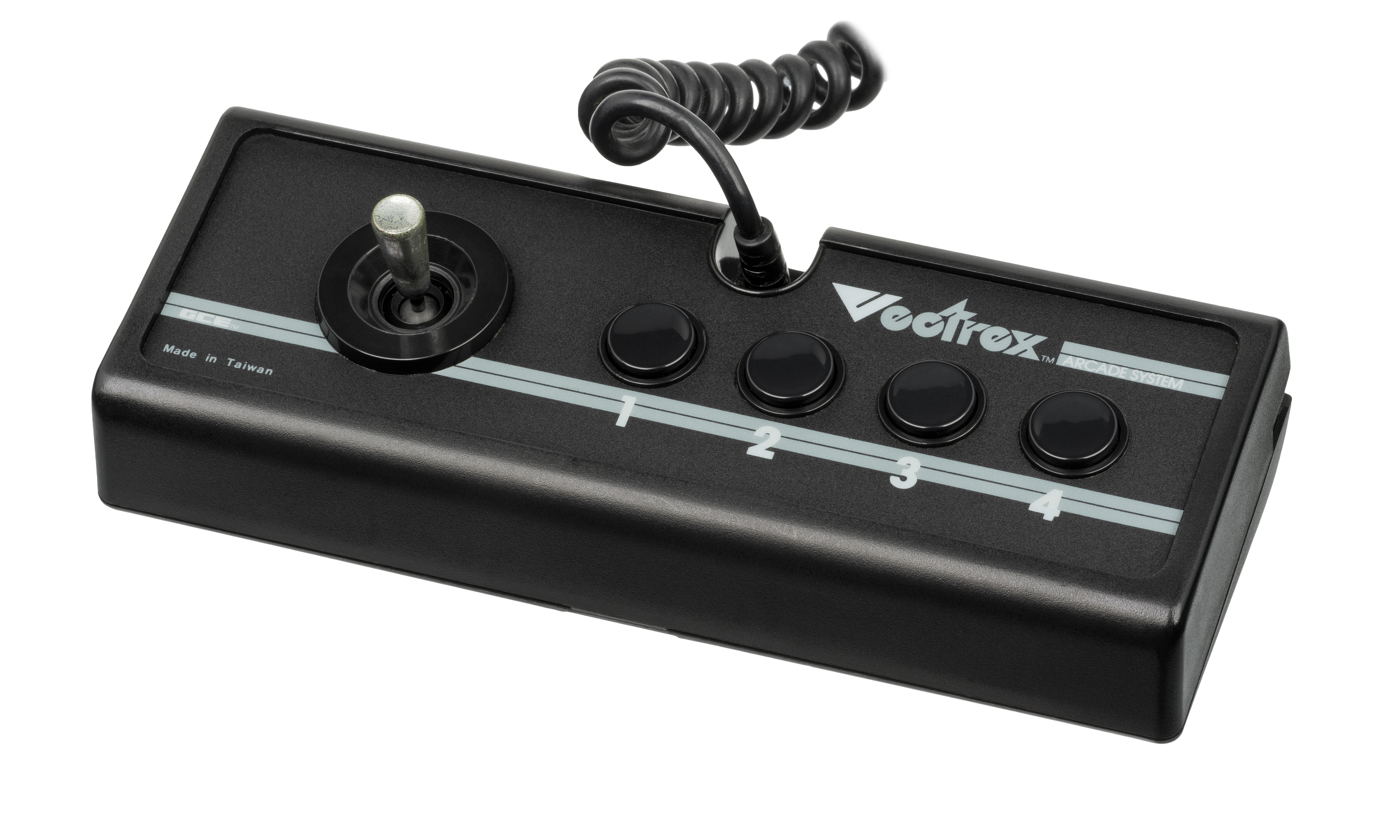
Vectrex (1982) controller with analog joystick

In 1982, Atari, Inc. released a controller with a potentiometer-based analog joystick for their Atari 5200 home console. However, its non-centering joystick design proved to be ungainly and unreliable due to the filing, alienating many consumers at the time. During that same year, General Consumer Electronics introduced the Vectrex, a vector graphics based system which used a self-centering analog joystick. It is possible for the joystick to be moved with the thumb, like a thumbstick.

In 1985, Sega's third-person rail shooter game Space Harrier, released for the arcades, introduced an analog flight stick for movement. It could register movement in any direction as well as measure the degree of push, which could move the player character at different speeds depending on how far the joystick is pushed in a certain direction.

Sega's analog Mission Stick was released for the Saturn console on September 29, 1995. On April 26, 1996, Sony released a potentiometer-based analog joystick for use in Flight-Simulation games. The Sony Dual Analog FlightStick featured twin analog sticks and was used in games such as Descent to provide a much greater degree of freedom than the typical digital joysticks of the day.

=== Analog thumbsticks ===
The Sony JS-303T for MSX and the Bullet-Proof Software BPS-Max for Famicom, both released in 1987, are early examples of a thumb pad-based joystick controller. In this case it is not an analog stick, but a mechanism that triggers the D-pad. The BPS-Max was later sold in the United States as NES Max by Nintendo. The Quickshot Chimera 2 is another example of an early thumbstick controller available to the NES.

In 1989, the Japanese company Dempa released an analog thumbstick controller called the XE-1 AP for the Mega Drive console and several Japanese computers (MSX, PC-88, PC-98, FM Towns, and X68000). It was also compatible with PC Engine via an adapter. An adapter for Famicom was also released but it only supports digital mode. It was intended to replicate the HOTAS controls found in Sega’s arcade games at the time, such as After Burner II (1987). This controller included a thumb-operated control stick which allowed for varying levels of movement and near-360-degree control, translating into far more precise movements than what is possible with a D-pad. It was released twice, with a price drop upon its re-release in 1994. A few games on the Mega Drive (as well as the Sega CD and 32X add-ons) supported the controller’s analog stick functions, including some of Sega’s first-party games for the system.

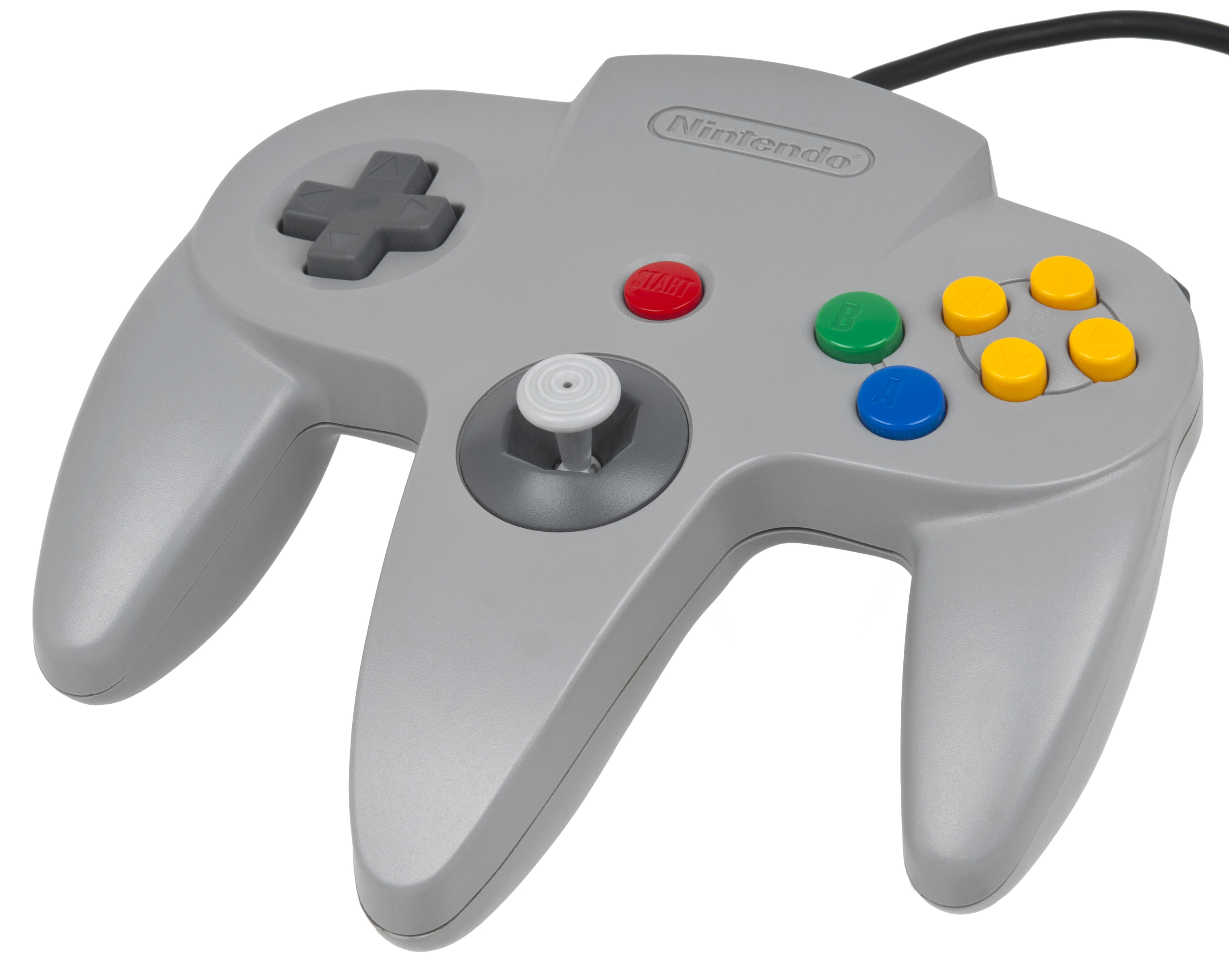
Nintendo 64 controller, announced in 1995 and released in 1996, popularized the analog thumbstick.

Initially announced in late 1995, Nintendo released their Nintendo 64 controller on June 23, 1996, in Japan. The new controller included a thumb-operated control stick which, while a digital stick (the analog stick operated on the same principles as a mechanical ball-type computer mouse), still allowed for varying levels of movement and near-360-degree control, translating into far more precise movements than were possible with a D-pad. The digital/optical technology was seen before on the Sidewinder 3D Pro announced on 18th September 1995. For three generations, Nintendo's control stick was distinguished from analog sticks used in other major consoles by its surrounding octagonal area of freedom that assisted players in perfectly aligning the stick with any of the eight directions achievable with a D-pad. Nintendo would eventually change this octagonal area to the circle widely used in other console controllers during the eighth generation starting with the Nintendo 3DS and Wii U.

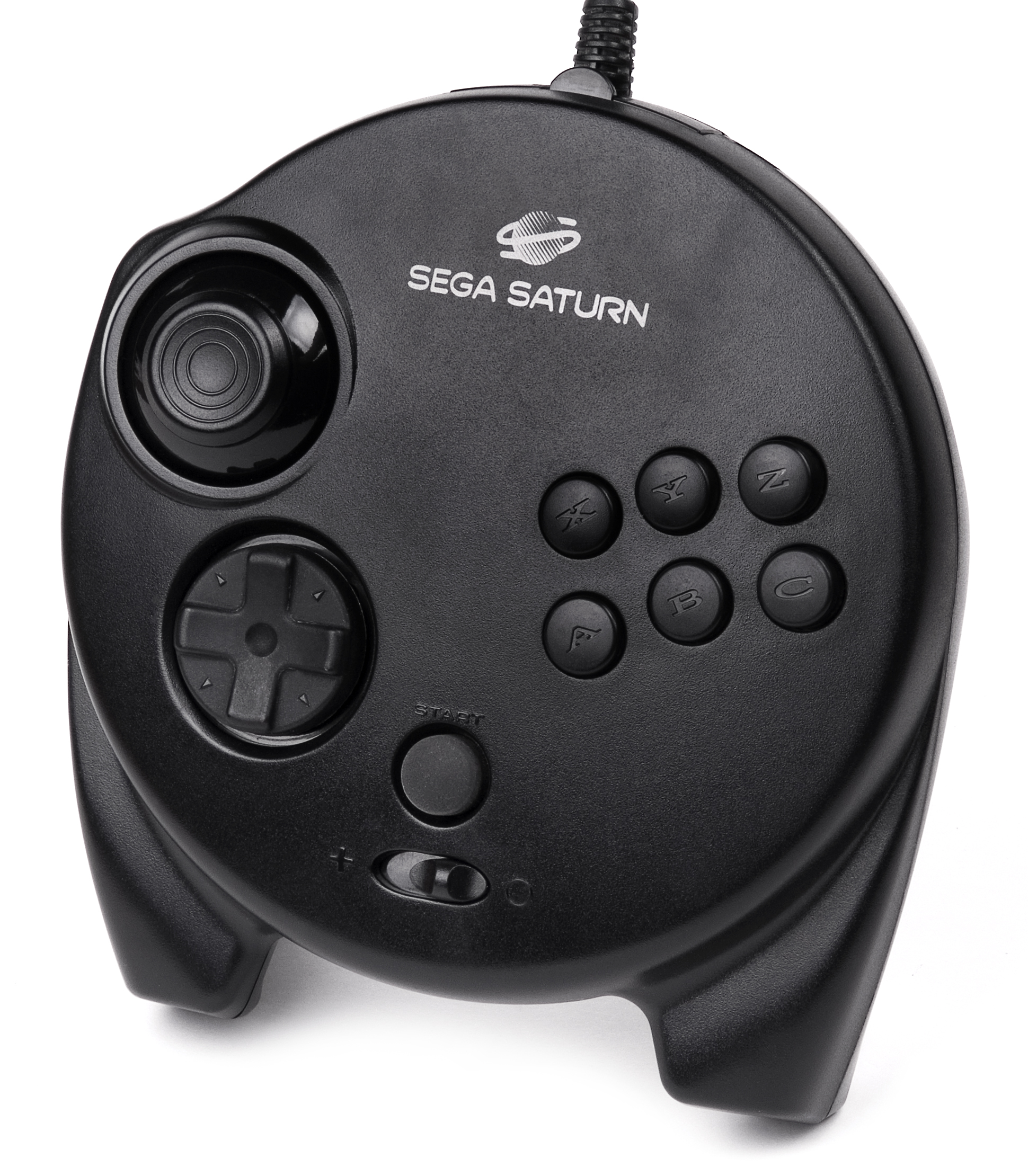
Saturn 3D Pad (1996), an analog thumbstick controller

On July 5, 1996, Sega released Nights into Dreams for their Saturn console in Japan; bundled with it was the Saturn 3D control pad which featured an analog pad intended to give the player more fluid control over that game's flight-based gameplay. The analog pad used magnet-based Hall-effect sensors, which was a unique implementation of the technology that was carried forward into the design of the Dreamcast controller as well. The Saturn's analog controller was previously mentioned in the June 1996 issue of Computer and Video Games magazine. Hall-effect analog pads have since gained a resurgence in the 2020s as a sturdier alternative to potentiometer-based analog sticks.

On April 25, 1997, Sony introduced the first dual-stick controller for its PlayStation console. Based on the same potentiometer technology that was used in the larger Dual Analog Flightstick, the Sony Dual Analog Controller featured rumble (removed in overseas versions), three modes of analog (Flightstick, Full Analog and Analog-Off), and dual plastic concave thumbsticks. It also added two new buttons, L3 and R3, under the thumbsticks, which could be used by pressing down on the sticks.

On November 20, 1997, Sony released their third analog controller to the market: the DualShock. The controller featured similar twin analog sticks to the Dual Analog, although they featured convex rubber tips rather than concave plastic ones. It also removed the third analog (Flightstick) mode and added two rumble motors.

In 1999, Sony's Ape Escape became the first video game to require two analog sticks.

In the console generations that followed, many video game console controllers have included two analog sticks, with the exception of the Dreamcast controller and Nintendo's Wii Remote controller. Other exceptions to this dual-stick rule are PlayStation Portable and Nintendo 3DS handheld game consoles aside from the New 3DS (although the former may be upgraded to dual-stick functionality through the use of an accessory), which both feature only a single small, flat sliding analog "nub".

== See also ==
- Wired glove
