= Suzo =

Suzo International was founded in 1955 in Rotterdam, The Netherlands and supplies components and solutions for the amusement, video game, casino, and vending industries.

It also develops and manufactures several (electronic) components, software products and systems as coin hoppers, pushbuttons, topper boxes and control mechanisms for the professional gaming industry. In 2005 Suzo merged with Happ Controls to form the Suzo-Happ Group - later stylized as SUZOHAPP. It is active in more than 60 countries worldwide. In North America, the organization does business as Happ based in Elk Grove, IL, and Suzo, based in Oud-Beijerland, the Netherlands, is responsible for international operations.

To the general public, the company is probably best known for its popular "The Arcade" range of joysticks for home computer and video game systems of the 1980s. Suzo products of this era are generally marked as being manufactured by "S.T.C. Rotterdam" rather than "Suzo".
