= The Arcade (joystick) =

Joystick produced by Suzo International

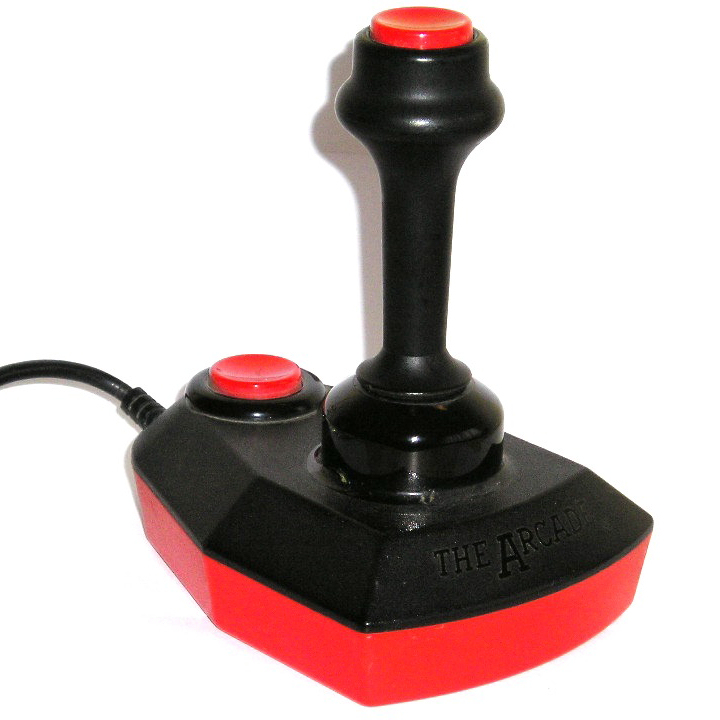
The Arcade Turbo

The Arcade is a joystick that was produced by Suzo International, usually marked as S.T.C. Rotterdam (Suzo Trading Company), for the European market. It distinguished itself from the competition because of its robust construction as the stick had a reinforced inside made of steel and used microswitches for the controls (but not the fire buttons, which used leaf springs).

It was a home version of the joystick used by the professional video game industry in many video arcade halls across the world.

The Arcade appeared in several variations:

- The Arcade Classic, without a fire button
- The Arcade, with just one fire button (at the front centre of the base)
- The Arcade Turbo, with two fire buttons (one on the base and one on the top of the stick, and a switch underneath the base to select button A/B)
- Prof Competition, with two fire buttons (one each on the front corners of the base)
- Prof Competition 9000, with three fire buttons (one each on the front corners of the base; one on top of the stick)
- Prof Competition 9000 de luxe, with three fire buttons (one each on the front corners of the base; one on top of the stick; and an adjustable rapid-fire switch)

The digital joystick was suitable for most 8 bit and 16-bit home computers such as MSX, Commodore 64, Amiga, Atari ST, and Amstrad CPC.
