= SuzoHapp North America =

American electronics company

- Formerly: Happ Controls, Inc.
- Type: Private
- Industry: Electronics industry
- Predecessor: Coin Controls
- Founded: 1986; 40 years ago
- Defunct: 2026; 0 years ago
- Headquarters: Mount Prospect, Illinois, United States
- Owner: ACON Investments
- Parent: Suzo-Happ Group
- Website: na.suzohapp.com

SuzoHapp North America (formerly Happ Controls, Inc.) was a large manufacturer and distributor of input device components and related accessories for arcade games, vending machines, casino games, and industrial control systems in the U.S. Headquartered in Mount Prospect, Illinois, the company produced its own products locally until 2005, when it began outsourcing to China.

In July 2026, SuzoHapp ceased operations and closed its doors.

== History ==
In 1986, Frank Happ was employed at the U.S. branch of Coin Controls, a U.K.-based company that manufactured coin doors and control systems for arcade machines. The company wanted to sell its controls division, which Happ purchased with a second mortgage on his home to form Happ Controls. His three children became employees of the company as they came of age, including Tom Happ who eventually took over from his father as president. In 1998, a distribution center was opened in Las Vegas to serve the local casino industry. In 2001, Happ purchased the assets of Midway Amusement Games, which was the original Midway Manufacturing Company that had been spun off from Midway Games. Happ also purchased the coin door division of Coin Controls, reuniting the two original business operations under his own enterprise. In 2004, the private equity firm Pfingsten Partners purchased a majority stake in Happ Controls. The infusion of capital enabled the purchase of the Netherlands-based manufacturer Suzo. The resulting merger produced the Suzo-Happ Group of companies, effectively doubling the company's revenue. In 2012, the Suzo-Happ Group was purchased by ACON Investments. Tom Happ remained the executive vice president of the Suzo-Happ Group until his departure in 2014.
