= Armatron =

Toy robot arm

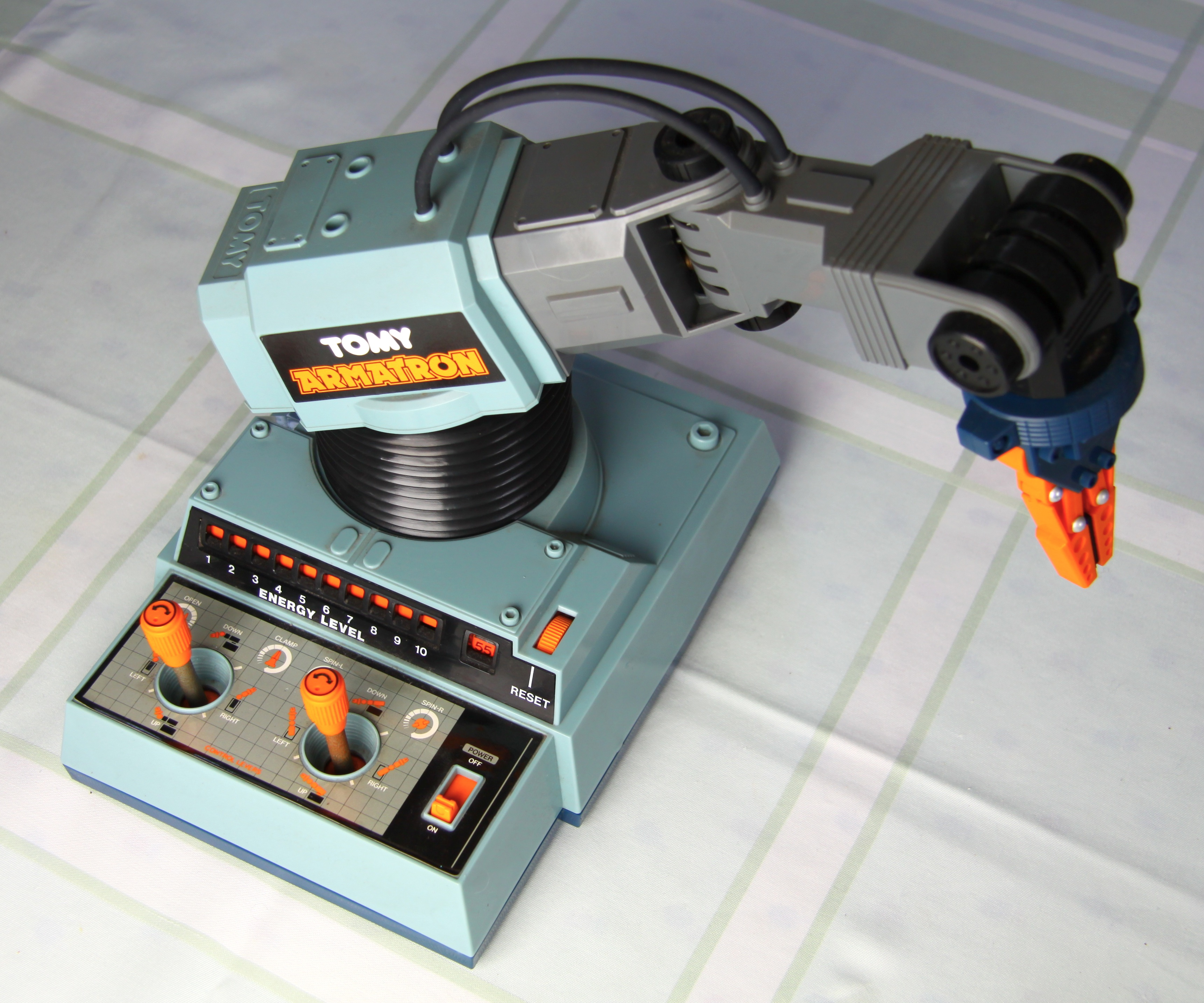
An Armatron

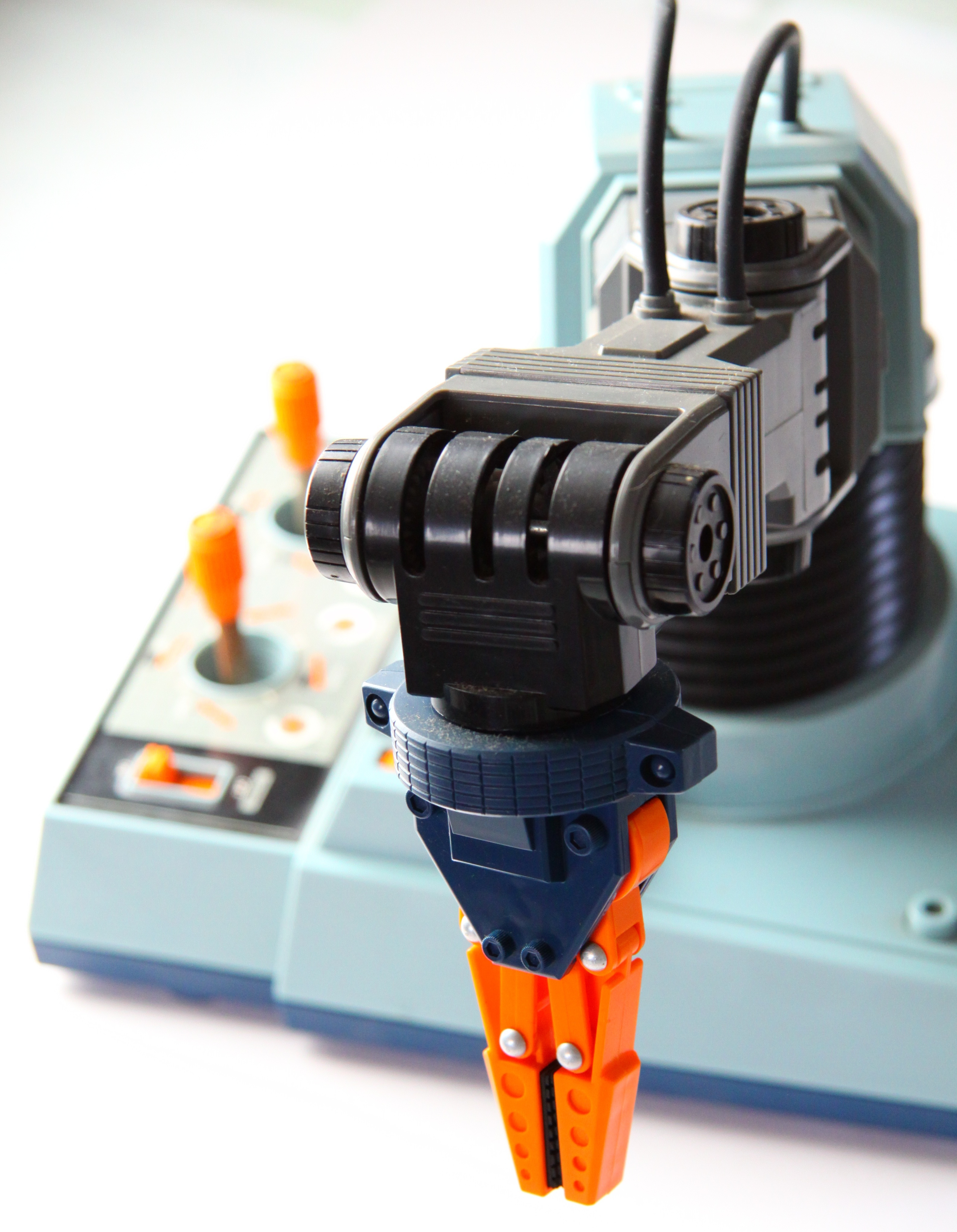
Hand detail

The Armatron is a toy robot which was made by TOMY and distributed by Radio Shack in the United States since 1984. It consists of a crane-like arm which picks up small objects by the user manipulating two attached joysticks. Its shape resembles industrial robots of the 1980s, though it is strictly user-controlled, with no automation built in. The arm has six degrees of freedom: wrist rotation (unlimited), vertical wrist flexing, horizontal elbow bending, shoulder horizontal rotation (unlimited), shoulder elevation, and the opening (releasing) and closing (grasping) of the two-fingered end-effector.

The module pack of plastic items to be lifted and moved, consists of two stepped cones, two spheres, two cylinders, a flat base module, and a hinged lidded box module. The modules have molded positions for the six objects, with the spheres resting on top of the cones when they are on the box module. The user is challenged to use the arm to move the spheres and cones from the top of the box to their positions on the flat module, open the lid of the box, and then remove the cylinders from the box and place them in position on the flat module. It is possible to do all of this with the arm alone. The Armatron includes an "energy level" indicator, actually a countdown timer, above the joysticks. This can be set by the user to an initial level from 1 to 10 "energy" units and it will shut off the arm when the set time runs out. The challenge is to move the objects in limited time.

Models with alternate decals or coloring were marketed under slightly different names, including the Super Armatron and the Armatron II. The original stationary version was succeeded by a mobile version with a wired remote.

The arm is almost purely mechanical and with no electronic components. The only electrical components are the DC motor, switch contacts in the countdown timer, on/off switch, and the batteries. The two joysticks selectively engage or disengage gears on a set of rotating drums to control the arm's movement.

== Inventor ==
The lead inventor of the Armatron was Hiroyuki Watanabe, a toy designer who worked for TOMY in Tokyo, Japan for 49 years. According to Wantanabe, the dual joystick controls were inspired by his radio-controlled helicopter hobby.

== See also ==
- Waldo (Heinlein)
- Waldo
