= Kraft Systems =

Defunct American joystick manufacturer

Kraft Systems, Inc.
- Type: Private
- Industry: Electronics
- Founded: 1962; 64 years ago in Pasadena, California, United States
- Founder: Philip O. Kraft
- Defunct: 1994; 32 years ago
- Fate: Intellectual property acquired by MicroSpeed, Inc.
- Headquarters: Vista, California (1969–1994)
- Products: Radio-control transmitters; Joysticks
- Number of employees: 250 (1981, peak)

Kraft Systems, Inc., was an American electronics company based in San Diego County, California, and active from 1962 to 1994. The company was founded by Philip O. Kraft and began as a manufacturer of transmitters for radio-controlled models, namely RC aircraft. In 1972, the company was acquired by the Carlisle Corporation of Cincinnati, Ohio, who kept Kraft around as a subsidiary still based in San Diego. In the early 1980s, Kraft pivoted to manufacturing joysticks for home and personal computers, becoming a major vendor in this market. Kraft eventually sold off their intellectual property to MicroSpeed, Inc., of Fremont, California, and shortly after went defunct.

== History ==
=== Foundation, early success, and acquisition by Carlisle (1962–1972) ===
Kraft Systems, Inc., was founded by Philip "Phil" O. Kraft (1926–2006), a model aircraft hobbyist since childhood, when he designed his own rubber-powered free-flight models. After graduating from the University of Southern California in the 1940s with a degree in business administration and working as a freelance and full-time designer of transmitters for radio-controlled models on and off throughout the 1950s and early 1960s, he founded Kraft Systems, Inc., from his garage in Pasadena, California, in 1962. Kraft said in 1969: "I was a manufacturer's representative who got fed up with the rat race." Phil Kraft was helped along by his mother, Virginia Kraft, who had sold her insurance agency in Pasadena to become Kraft Systems' comptroller and office manager. In 1964, Kraft Systems moved from out of Phil's garage to an industrial plant in South El Monte, California. By 1968, the company employed 80 people and generated $2 million in gross revenue—up from roughly $660,000 in 1967. In February 1968, the company purchased a 6.5-acre plot of land in Vista, California, on which to build a warehouse. Construction of Kraft's 15,000-square-foot headquarters commenced in July and was completed by January 1969. The company hired roughly 45 more employees in the Vista area, bringing the total workforce to 125 by mid-1969. Kraft remained in Vista until its dissolution in 1994.

Kraft soon became one of the largest firms manufacturing RC transmitters for model planes in the United States, the firm reporting $2.5 million in sales in 1970, when the model plane industry as a whole reported $15 million in sales that year. In June 1972, the Carlisle Corporation of Cincinnati, Ohio, announced their acquisition of Kraft Systems for an undisclosed amount. Carlisle kept Kraft around as an independently managed subsidiary throughout the rest of Kraft's existence, with Phil Kraft remaining on board as president. By 1977, the company sold 400 RC transmitter units a week and employed 150 workers.

=== Expansion and computer joysticks (1972–1994) ===
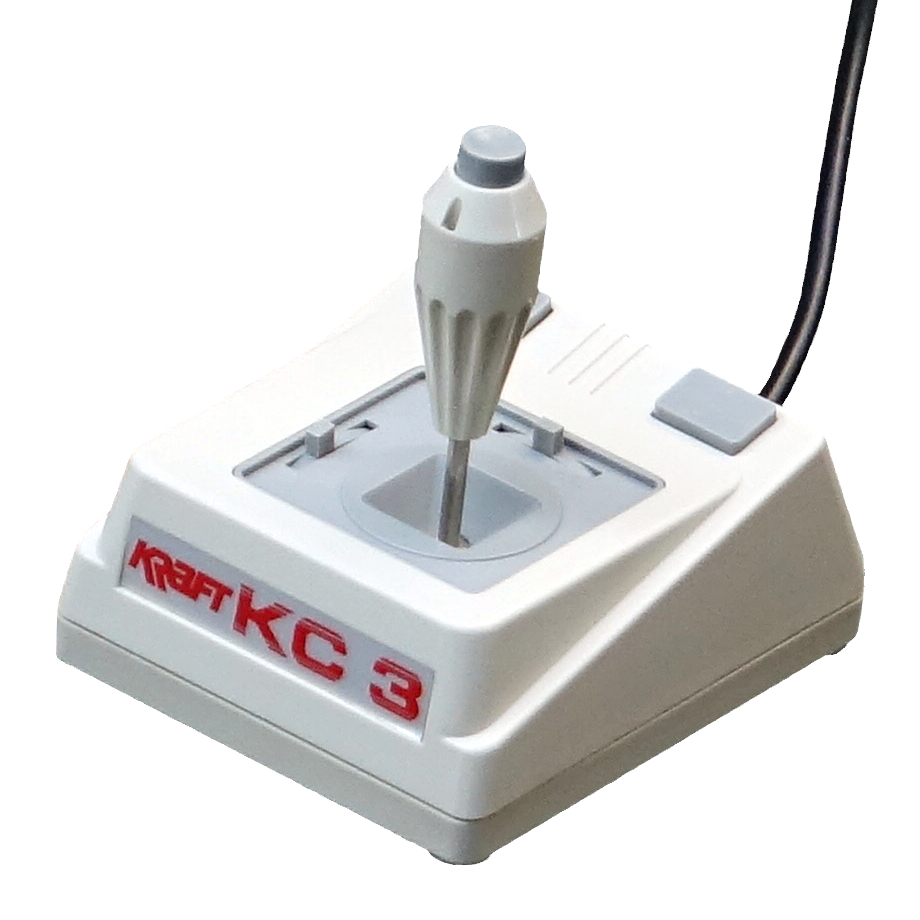
Kraft KC 3 joystick

Following their acquisition, Kraft began branching out beyond their core hobbyist userbase by offering joysticks for professional and industrial use. In 1974, the company was commissioned by Twentieth Century-Fox to design the model helicopters and the associated transceiver system used as practical special effects during the filming of The Towering Inferno. In the mid-1970s, Henson Associates commissioned Kraft to design special transceivers that control the Muppet audience for The Muppet Show. In the turn of the 1980s, Kraft began manufacturing remote control units for heavy equipment in industrial environments, and in 1981, the company introduced joysticks for the graphical computer workstation market. The company was moderately affected by the early 1980s recession, Kraft's workforce shrinking from 250 in 1981 to 200 in 1982. Also cited for the downturn was Japanese competitors encroaching in Kraft's core market of hobbyists.

In 1982, the company introduced the Premium line of joysticks for home computers, which made use of Kraft's gimbal technologies that they had patented and used in their industrial control units and RC transmitters. The Premium line sold incredibly well for Kraft and became a fixture of the personal computer games industry throughout the 1980s. Kraft was one of the first manufacturers to offer joysticks for the IBM's Personal Computer in 1982, long before it became a popular platform for gamers. IBM themselves later commissioned Kraft for the manufacture of the joysticks for their ill-fated PCjr, released in 1984.

By the end of 1983, Kraft sold $12 million worth of joysticks and was Vista's third-largest employer (with 100 workers) and most-profitable company. The company attempted to maintain an entirely domestic manufacturing presence, hiring local students from Sierra Vista High School (including those from the school's disability program), but by the end of the decade, consolidation in the industry compelled Kraft to outsource some of their manufacturing overseas in East Asia for cheaper labor.

=== Acquisition by MicroSpeed (1994) ===
In 1994, MicroSpeed, Inc., a maker of computer peripherals such as keyboards, mice, and trackballs, acquired Kraft Systems' intellectual property for an undisclosed amount, effectively ending Kraft as a manufacturing concern.
