= Joystick =

Control lever used in aircraft and video games

Possible elements of a video game joystick: 1. stick, 2. base, 3. trigger, 4. extra buttons, 5. autofire switch, 6. throttle, 7. hat switch (POV hat), 8. suction cups.

A joystick, sometimes called a flight stick, is an input device consisting of a stick that pivots on a base and reports its angle or direction to the device it is controlling. Also known as the control column, it is the principal control device in the cockpit of many civilian and military aircraft, either as a centre stick or side-stick. It has various switches to control functions of the aircraft controlled by the Pilot and First Officer of the flight.

Joysticks are often used to control video games, and usually have push-buttons whose state can be read by the computer. A popular variation of the joystick used on modern video game consoles is the analog stick. Joysticks are also used for controlling machines such as cranes, trucks, underwater unmanned vehicles, wheelchairs, surveillance cameras, and zero turning radius lawn mowers. Miniature finger-operated joysticks have been adopted as input devices for smaller electronic equipment such as mobile phones.

== Aviation ==
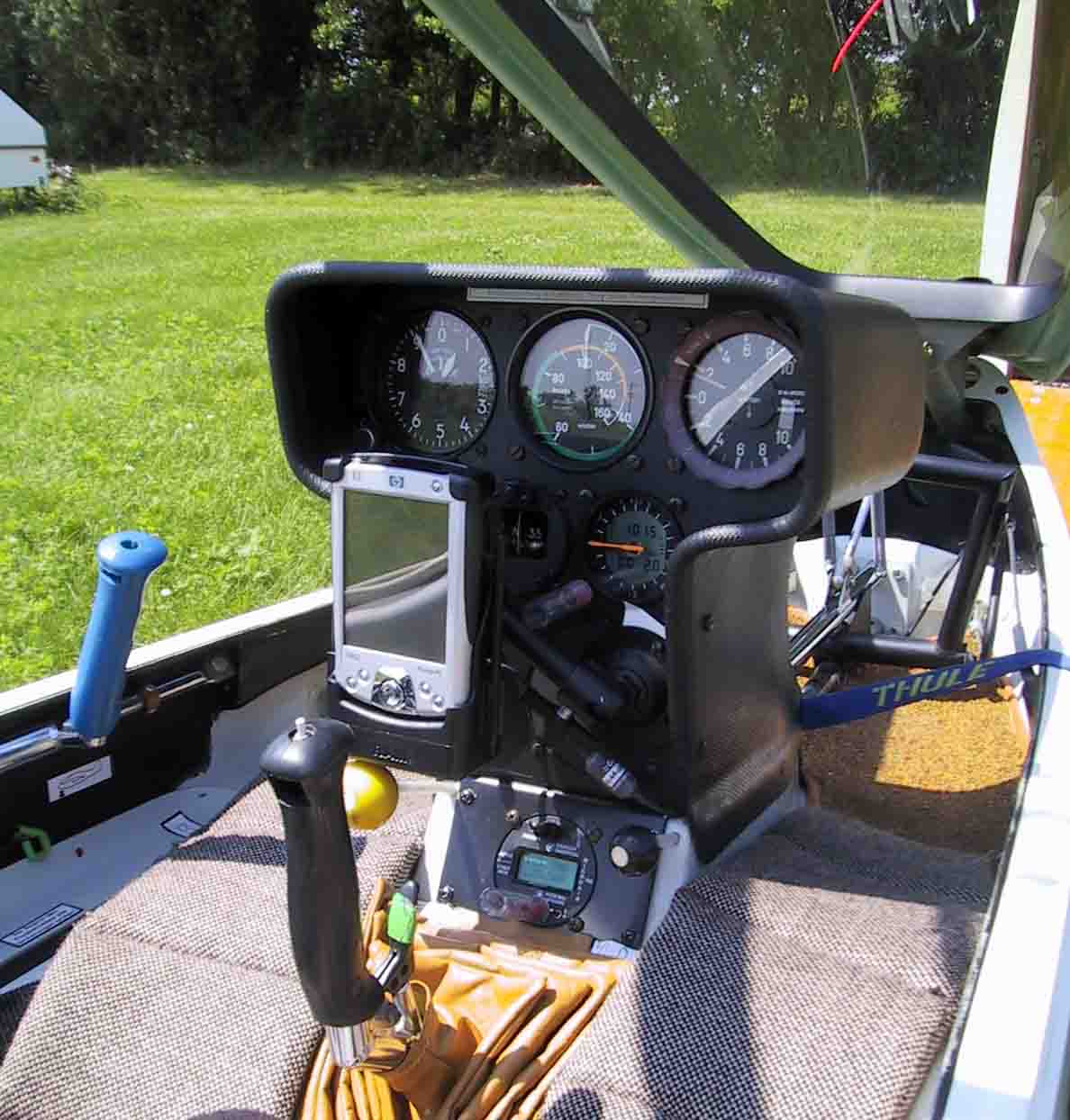
Cockpit of a glider with its joystick visible

Joysticks originated as controls for aircraft ailerons and elevators, and are first known to have been used as such on Louis Bleriot's Bleriot VIII aircraft of 1908, in combination with a foot-operated rudder bar for the yaw control surface on the tail.

== Origins ==
The name joystick is thought to originate with early 20th century French pilot Robert Esnault-Pelterie. There are also competing claims on behalf of fellow pilots Robert Loraine, James Henry Joyce, and A. E. George. Loraine is cited by the Oxford English Dictionary for using the term "joystick" in his diary in 1909 when he went to Pau to learn to fly at Blériot's school. George was a pioneer aviator who with his colleague Jobling built and flew a biplane at Newcastle in England in 1910. The George and Jobling aircraft control column is in the collection of the Discovery Museum in Newcastle upon Tyne, England. Joysticks were present in early planes, though their mechanical origins are uncertain. The coining of the term "joystick" may actually be credited to Loraine, as his is the earliest known usage of the term, although he most certainly did not invent the device.

== Electronic joysticks ==
=== History ===
The electrical two-axis joystick was invented by C. B. Mirick at the United States Naval Research Laboratory (NRL) and patented in 1926 (U.S. Patent no. 1,597,416)". NRL was actively developing remote controlled aircraft at the time and the joystick was possibly used to support this effort. In the awarded patent, Mirick writes: "My control system is particularly applicable in maneuvering aircraft without a pilot."

The Germans developed an electrical two-axis joystick around 1944. The device was used as part of the Germans' Funkgerät FuG 203 Kehl radio control transmitter system used in certain German bomber aircraft, used to guide both the rocket-boosted anti-ship missile Henschel Hs 293, and the unpowered pioneering precision-guided munition Fritz-X, against maritime and other targets. Here, the joystick of the Kehl transmitter was used by an operator to steer the missile towards its target. This joystick had on-off switches rather than analogue sensors. Both the Hs 293 and Fritz-X used FuG 230 Straßburg radio receivers in them to send the Kehl's control signals to the ordnance's control surfaces. A comparable joystick unit was used for the contemporary American Azon steerable munition, strictly to laterally steer the munition in the yaw axis only.

This German invention was picked up by someone in the team of scientists assembled at the Heeresversuchsanstalt in Peenemünde. Here a part of the team on the German rocket program was developing the Wasserfall missile, a variant of the V-2 rocket, the first ground-to-air missile. The Wasserfall steering equipment converted the electrical signal to radio signals and transmitted these to the missile.

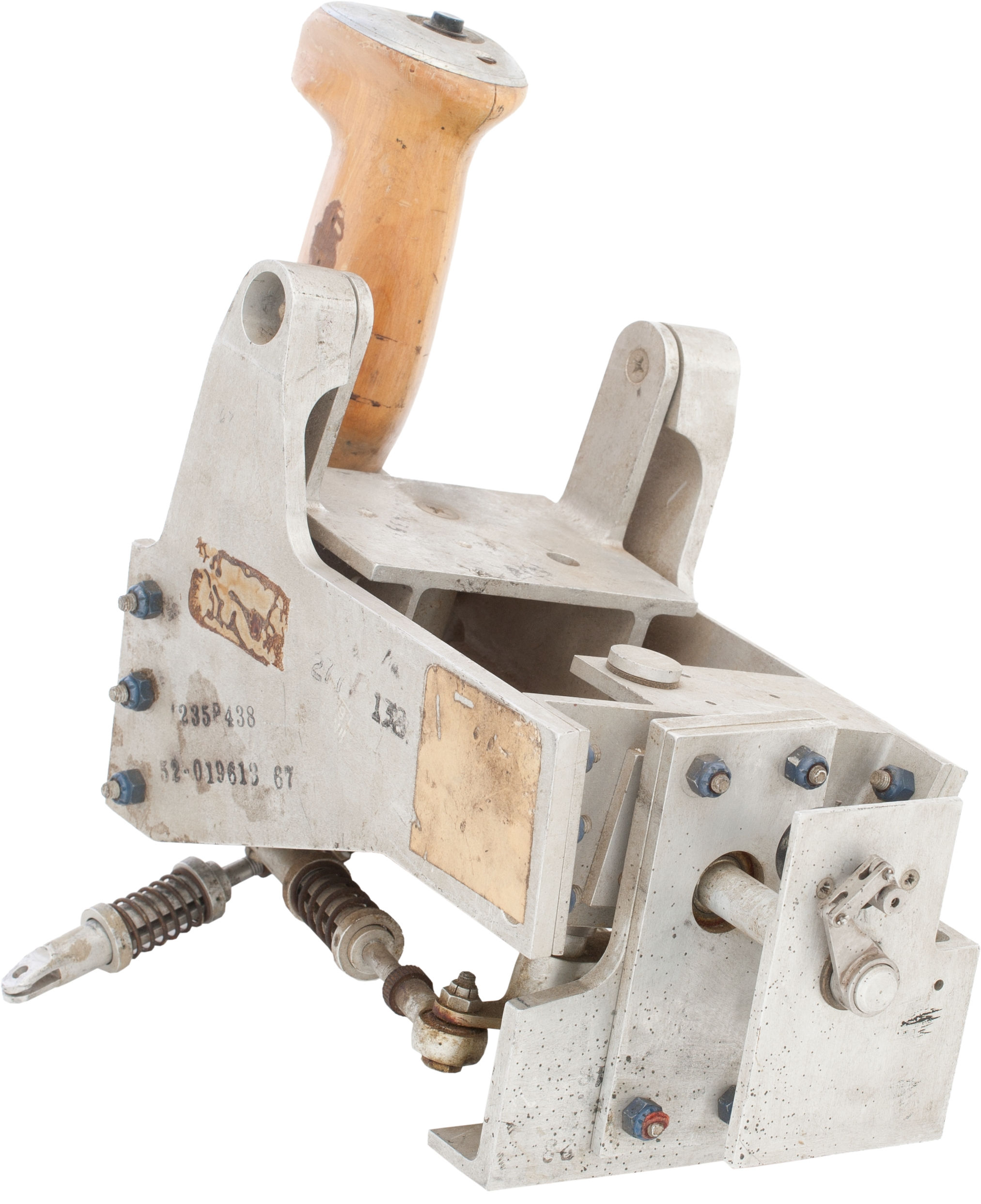
A prototype Project Gemini joystick-type hand controller, 1962

In the 1960s the use of joysticks became widespread in radio-controlled model aircraft systems such as the Kwik Fly produced by Phill Kraft (1964). The now-defunct Kraft Systems firm eventually became an important OEM supplier of joysticks to the computer industry and other users. The first use of joysticks outside the radio-controlled aircraft industry may have been in the control of powered wheelchairs, such as the Permobil (1963). During this time period NASA used joysticks as control devices as part of the Apollo missions. For example, the lunar lander test models were controlled with a joystick.

In many modern airliners, for example all Airbus aircraft developed from the 1980s, the joystick has received a new lease on life for flight control in the form of the "side-stick", a controller similar to a gaming joystick but which is used to control flight, replacing the traditional yoke. The sidestick saves weight, improves movement and visibility in the cockpit, and may be safer in an accident than the yoke.

=== Electronic games ===
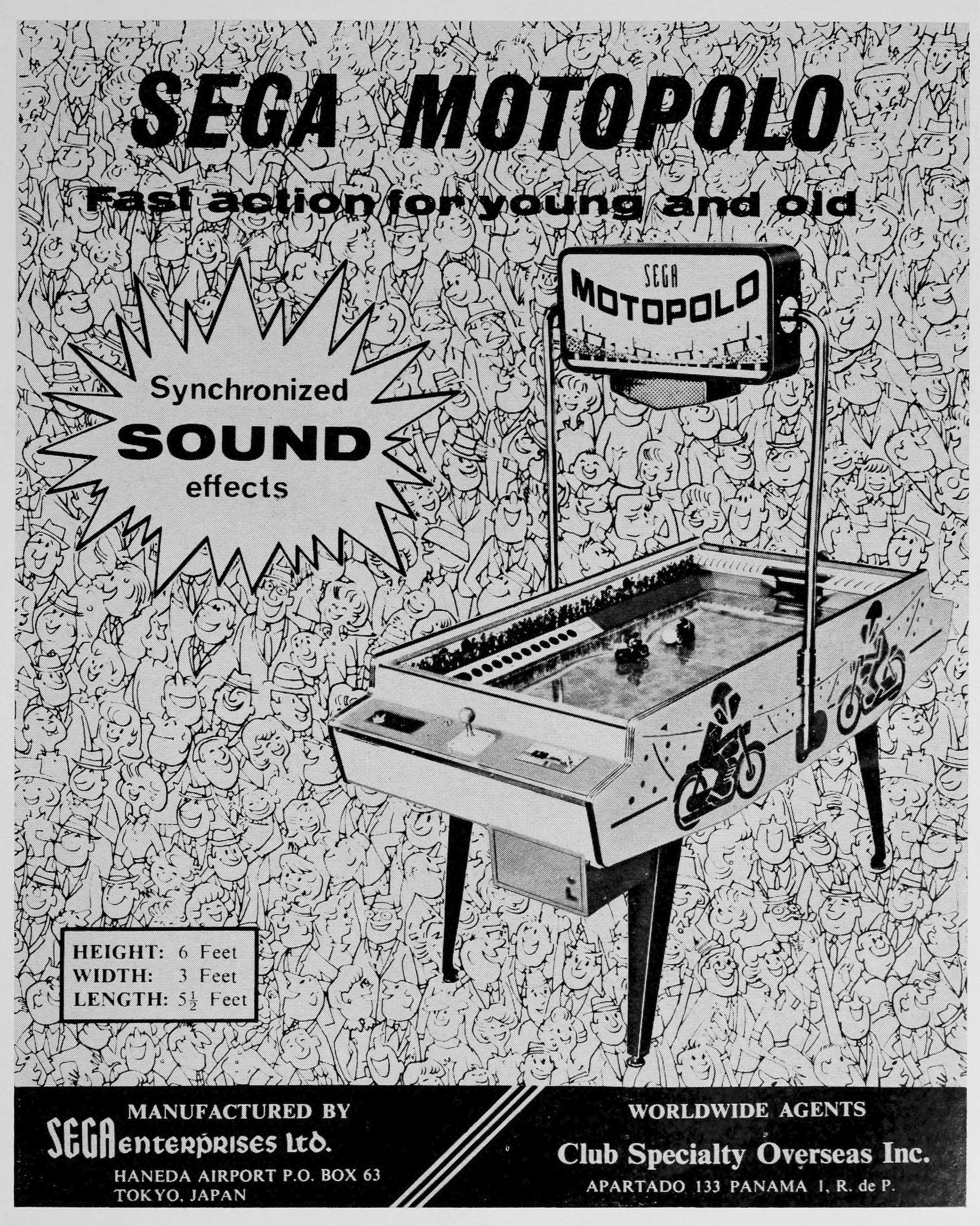
Sega's MotoPolo (1968), an arcade electro-mechanical game with joystick controls

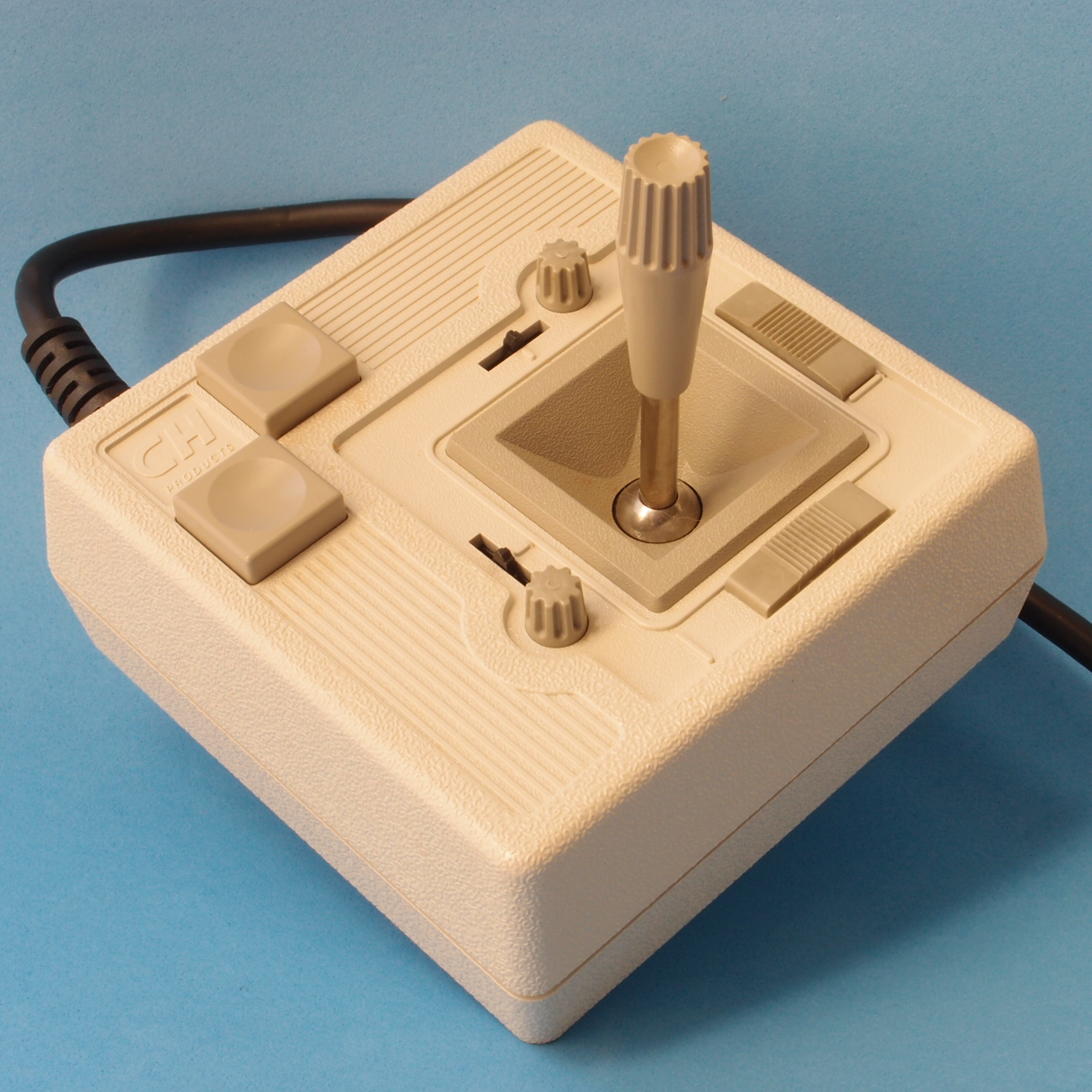
CH Products Mach II analog joystick for Apple II computers. The small knobs are for (mechanical) calibration, and the sliders engage the self-centering springs.

In early 1968, Sega released MotoPolo, an arcade electro-mechanical game with joystick controllers, used to move miniature motorbikes in any direction on the table. The same year in 1968, Ralph H. Baer developed the first prototype joystick controller for a video game, with a golf ball mounted on the joystick handle as it was intended for a golf game he was working on at the time.

The earliest known electronic game joystick with a fire button was released by Sega as part of their 1969 arcade game Missile, a shooter simulation game that used it as part of an early dual-control scheme, where two directional buttons are used to move a motorized tank and a two-way joystick is used to shoot and steer the missile onto oncoming planes displayed on the screen; when a plane is hit, an explosion is animated on screen along with an explosion sound. In 1970, the game was released in North America as S.A.M.I. by Midway Games.

Taito released a four-way joystick as part of their arcade racing video game Astro Race in 1973, while their 1975 multidirectional shooter Western Gun introduced dual-stick controls with one eight-way joystick for movement and the other for changing the shooting direction. In North America, it was released by Midway under the title Gun Fight. In 1976, Taito released Interceptor, an early first-person combat flight simulator that involved piloting a jet fighter, using an eight-way joystick to aim with a crosshair and shoot at enemy aircraft.

Computer port view of the Atari standard connector: 1. up, 2. down, 3. left, 4. right, 5. (pot y), 6. fire button, 7. +5 V DC, 8. ground, 9. (pot x).

The Atari CX40 joystick, developed for the 1977 Atari Video Computer System, is a digital controller with a single fire button. The Atari joystick port was for many years the de facto standard digital joystick specification. Joysticks were commonly used as controllers in first and second generation game consoles, but they gave way to the familiar game pad with the Nintendo Entertainment System and Master System during the mid-1980s, though joysticks—especially arcade-style ones—were and are popular after-market add-ons for any console.

The Armatron, a toy robot arm introduced by Tomy in 1982, was moved by dual analog control joysticks.

In 1985, Sega's third-person arcade rail shooter game Space Harrier featured a true analog flight stick, used for movement. The joystick could register movement in any direction as well as measure the degree of push, which could move the player character at different speeds depending on how far the joystick was pushed in a certain direction.

A variation of the joystick is the rotary joystick. It is a type of joystick-knob hybrid, where the joystick can be moved in various direction while at the same time being able to rotate the joystick. It is mainly used in arcade shoot 'em up games, to control both the player's eight-directional movement and the gun's 360-degree direction. It was introduced by SNK, initially with the tank shooter TNK III (1985) before it was popularized by the run and gun video game Ikari Warriors (1986). SNK later used rotary joystick controls in arcade games such as Guerrilla War (1987).

A distinct variation of an analog joystick is a positional gun, which works differently from a light gun. Instead of using light sensors, a positional gun is essentially an analog joystick mounted in a fixed location that records the position of the gun to determine where the player is aiming on the screen. It is often used for arcade gun games, with early examples including Sega's Sea Devil in 1972; Taito's Attack in 1976; Cross Fire in 1977; and Nintendo's Battle Shark in 1978.

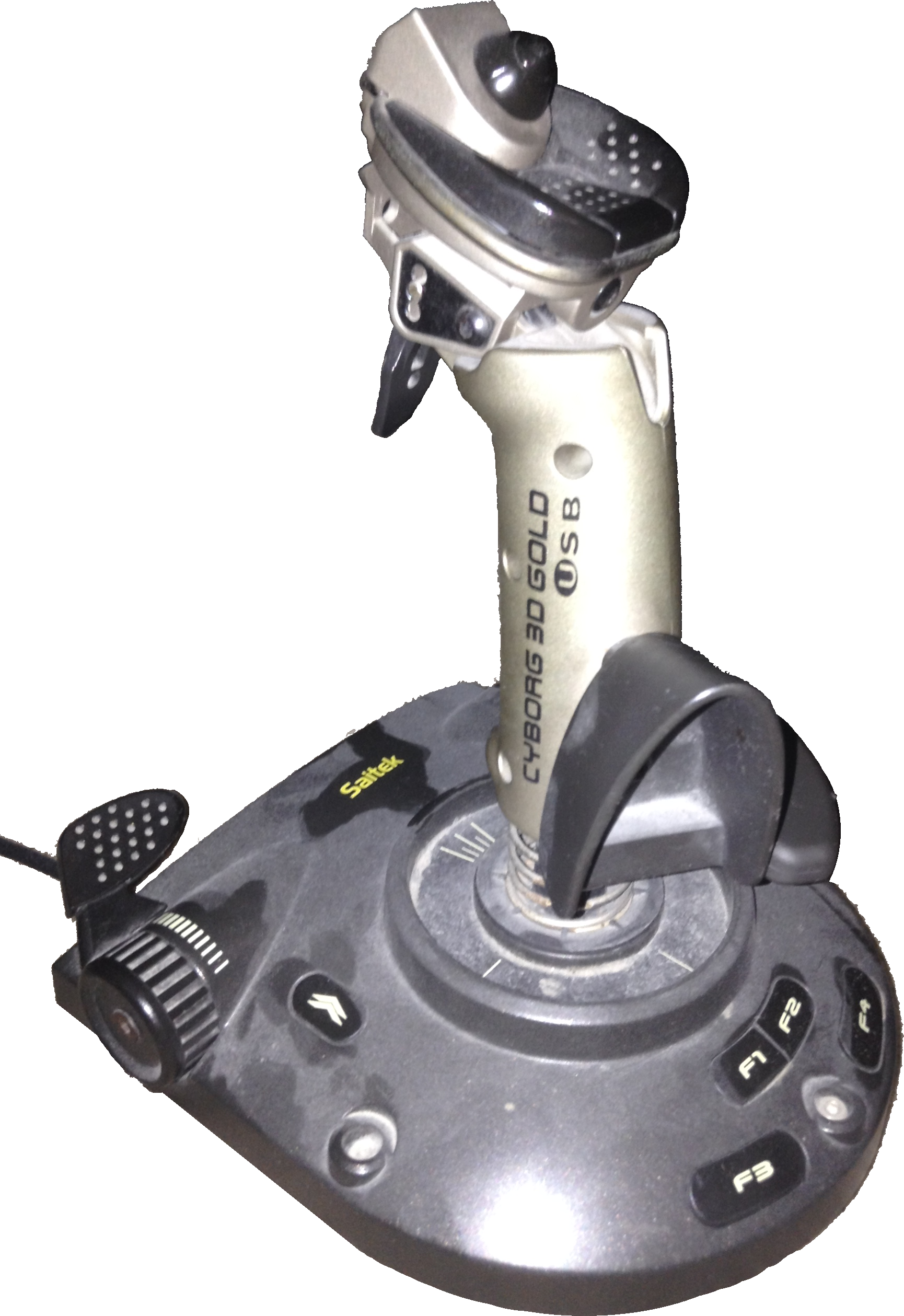
Saitek's Cyborg 3D Gold around the 2000s. Note its throttle, its extra buttons, and its hat switch.

During the 1990s, joysticks such as the CH Products Flightstick, Gravis Phoenix, Microsoft SideWinder, Logitech WingMan, and Thrustmaster FCS were in demand with PC gamers. They were considered a prerequisite for flight simulators such as F-16 Fighting Falcon and LHX Attack Chopper. Joysticks became especially popular with the mainstream success of space flight simulator games like X-Wing and Wing Commander, as well as the "Six degrees of freedom" 3D shooter Descent. VirPil Controls' MongoosT-50 joystick was designed to mimic the style of Russian aircraft (including the Sukhoi Su-35 and Sukhoi Su-57), unlike most flight joysticks.

However, since the beginning of the 21st century, these types of games have waned in popularity and are now considered a "dead" genre, and with that, gaming joysticks have been reduced to niche products. In NowGamer's interview with Jim Boone, a producer at Volition Inc., he stated that FreeSpace 2's poor sales could have been due to joysticks' being sold poorly because they were "going out of fashion" because more modern first-person shooters, such as Quake, were "very much about the mouse and [the] keyboard". He went further on to state "Before that, when we did Descent for example, it was perfectly common for people to have joysticks – we sold a lot of copies of Descent. It was around that time [when] the more modern FPS with mouse and keyboard came out, as opposed to just keyboard like Wolfenstein [3D] or something.".

Since the late 1990s, analog sticks (or thumbsticks, due to their being controlled by one's thumbs) have become standard on controllers for video game consoles, popularized by Nintendo's Nintendo 64 controller, and have the ability to indicate the stick's displacement from its neutral position. This means that the software does not have to keep track of the position or estimate the speed at which the controls are moved. These devices usually use potentiometers to determine the position of the stick, though some newer models instead use a Hall-effect sensor for greater reliability and reduced size.

In 1997, ThrustMaster, Inc. introduced a 3D programmable controller, which was integrated into computer games to experience flight simulations. This line adapted several aspects of NASA's RHC (Rotational Hand Controller), which is used for landing and navigation methods.

In 1997 the first gaming joystick with force feedback (haptics) was manufactured by CH Products under license from technology creator, Immersion Corporation. The product, called the Force FX joystick was followed by force feedback joysticks from Logitech, Thrustmaster, and others, also under license from Immersion.

=== Arcade sticks ===
An arcade stick is a large-format controller for use with home consoles or computers. They use the stick-and-button configuration of some arcade cabinets, such as those with particular multi-button arrangements. For example, the six button layout of the arcade games Street Fighter II or Mortal Kombat cannot be comfortably emulated on a console joypad, so licensed home arcade sticks for these games have been manufactured for home consoles and PCs.

=== Hat switch ===
Hat switch – at top, in green

A hat switch is a control on some joysticks. It is also known as a POV (point of view) switch in electronic games, where it allows one to look around in one's virtual world, browse menus, etc. For example, many flight simulators use it to switch the player's views, while other games sometimes use it as a substitute for the D-pad. Computer gamepads with both an analogue stick and a D-pad usually assign POV switch scancodes to the latter.

The term hat switch is a shortening of the term "coolie hat switch", named for the similar looking headgear.

In a real aircraft, the hat switch may control things like aileron or elevator trim.

=== Cameras ===
Apart from buttons, wheels and dials as well as touchscreens also miniature joysticks have been established for the efficient manual operation of cameras.

Miniature joystick on a mirrorless interchangeable-lens camera

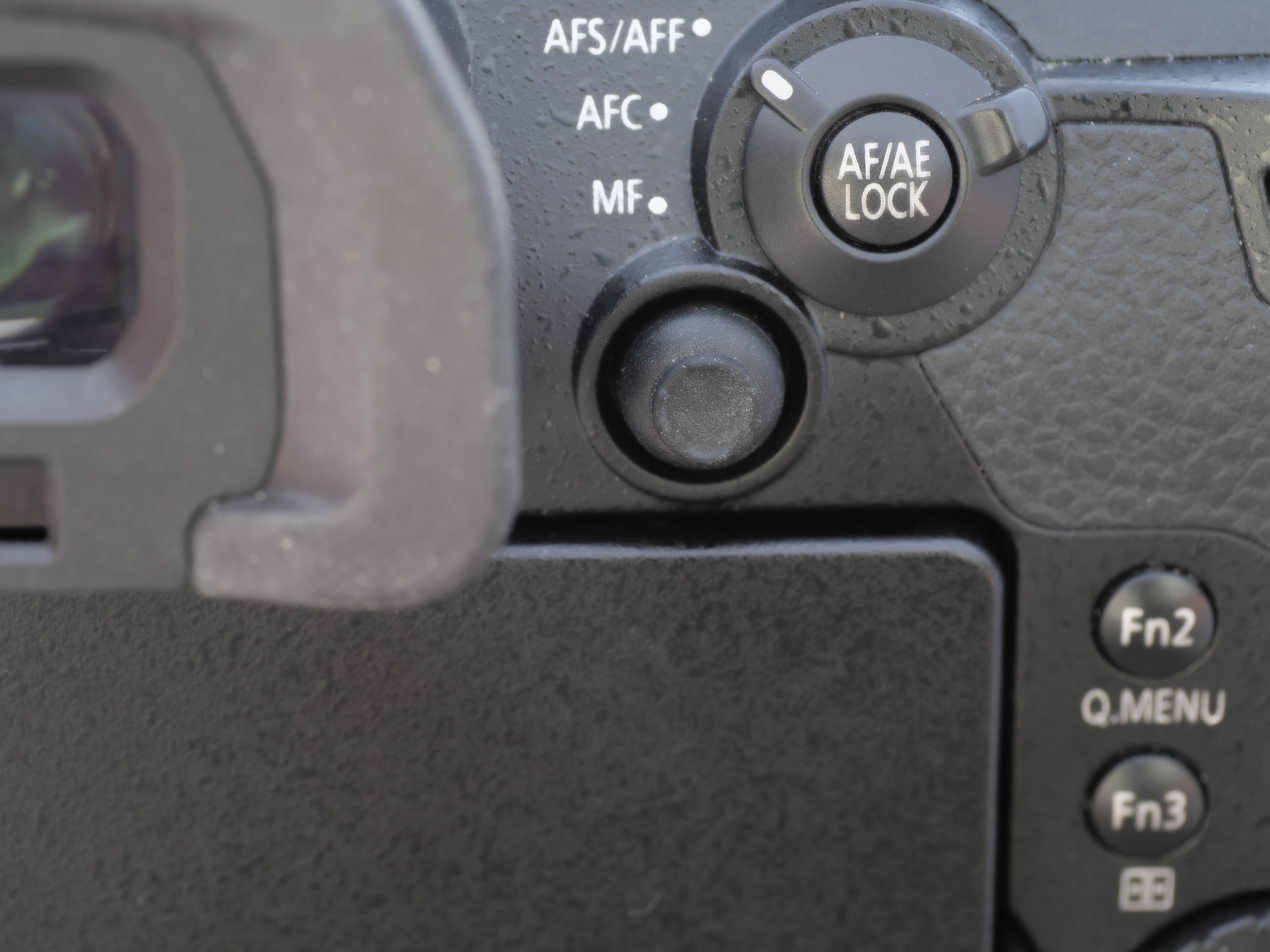
Miniature joystick to be operated by the right thumb, next to an electronic viewfinder

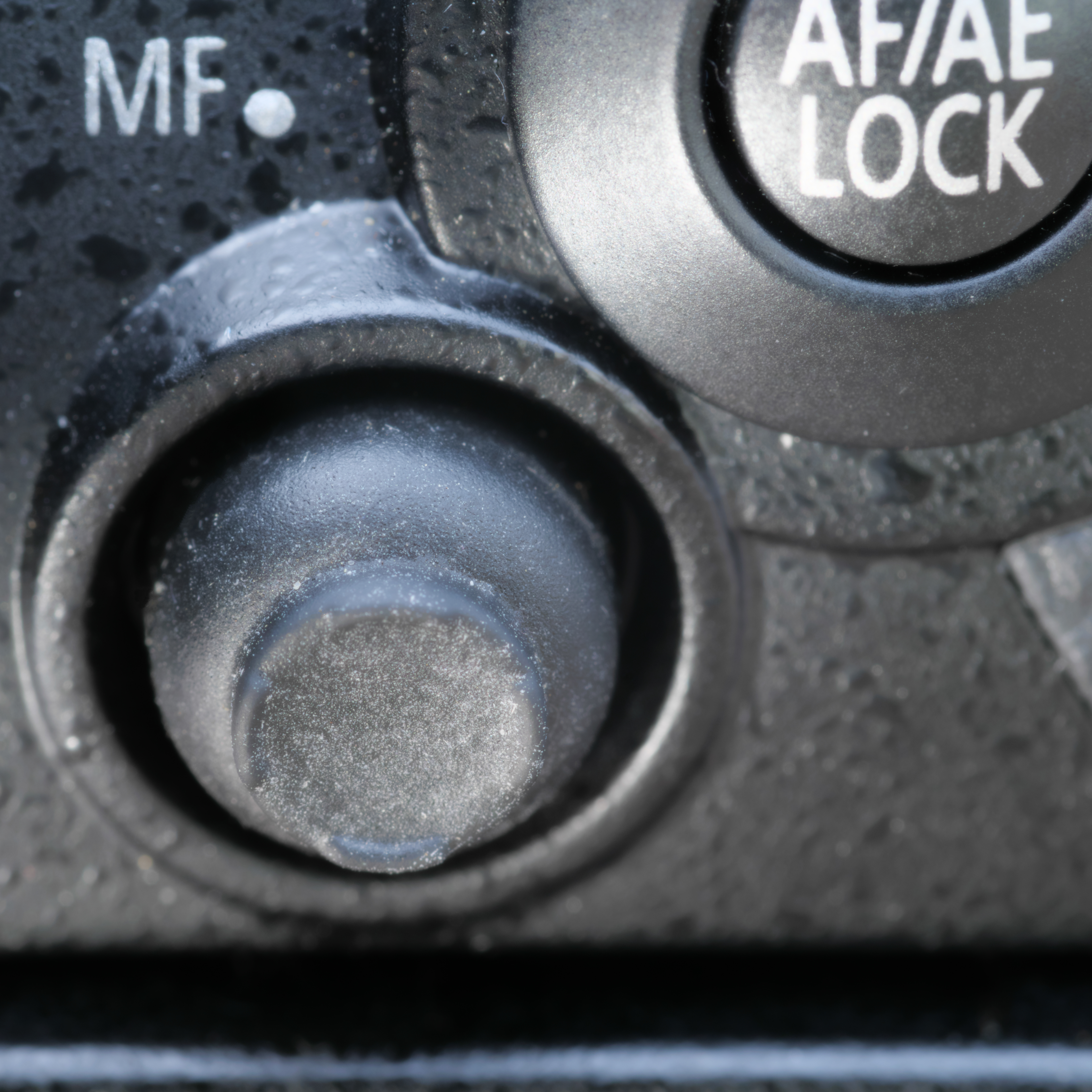
Detailed view

== Industrial applications ==
In recent times, the employment of joysticks has become commonplace in many industrial and manufacturing applications, such as cranes, assembly lines, forestry equipment, mining trucks, and excavators. In fact, the use of such joysticks is in such high demand, that it has virtually replaced the traditional mechanical control lever in nearly all modern hydraulic control systems. Additionally, most unmanned aerial vehicles (UAVs) and submersible remotely operated vehicles (ROVs) require at least one joystick to control either the vehicle, the on-board cameras, sensors and/or manipulators.

Due to the highly hands-on, rough nature of such applications, the industrial joystick tends to be more robust than the typical video-game controller, and able to function over a high cycle life. This led to the development and employment of Hall-effect sensing to such applications in the 1980s as a means of contactless sensing. Several companies produce joysticks for industrial applications using Hall-effect technology. Another technology used in joystick design is the use of strain gauges to build force transducers from which the output is proportional to the force applied rather than physical deflection. Miniature force transducers are used as additional controls on joysticks for menu selection functions.

Some larger manufacturers of joysticks are able to customize joystick handles and grips specific to the OEM needs while small regional manufacturers often concentrate on selling standard products at higher prices to smaller OEMs.

== Assistive technology ==
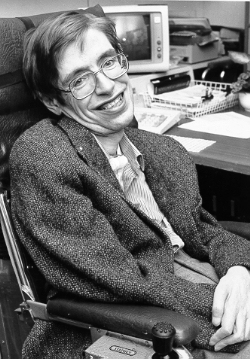
Stephen Hawking

Specialist joysticks, classed as an assistive technology pointing device, are used to replace the computer mouse for people with fairly severe physical disabilities. Rather than controlling games, these joysticks control the pointer. They are often useful to people with athetoid conditions, such as cerebral palsy, who find them easier to grasp than a standard mouse. Miniature joysticks are available for people with conditions involving muscular weakness such as muscular dystrophy or motor neuron disease as well. They are also used on electric powered wheelchairs for control since they are simple and effective to use as a control method.

== Non-human use ==
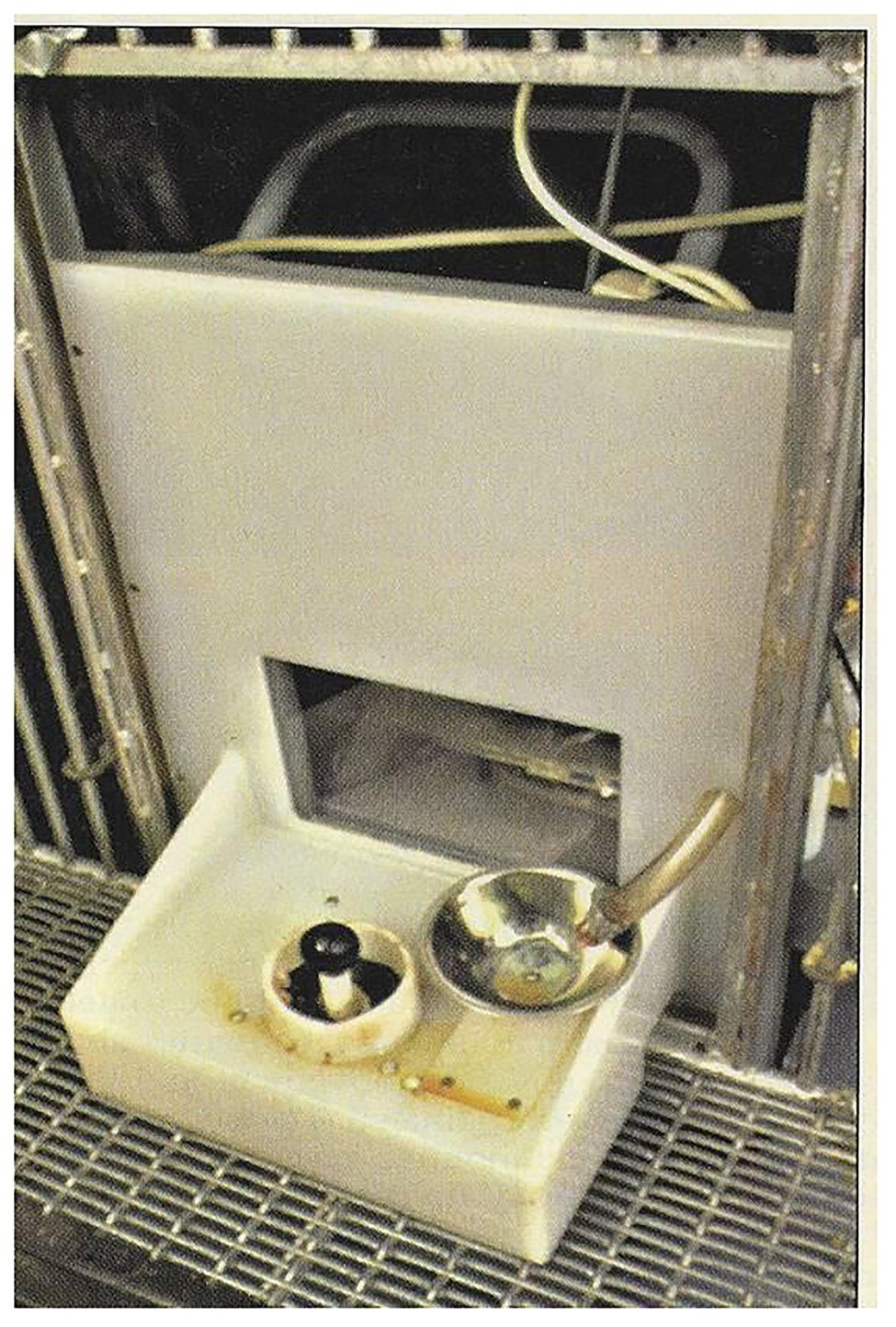
A joystick designed specifically to be used by pigs

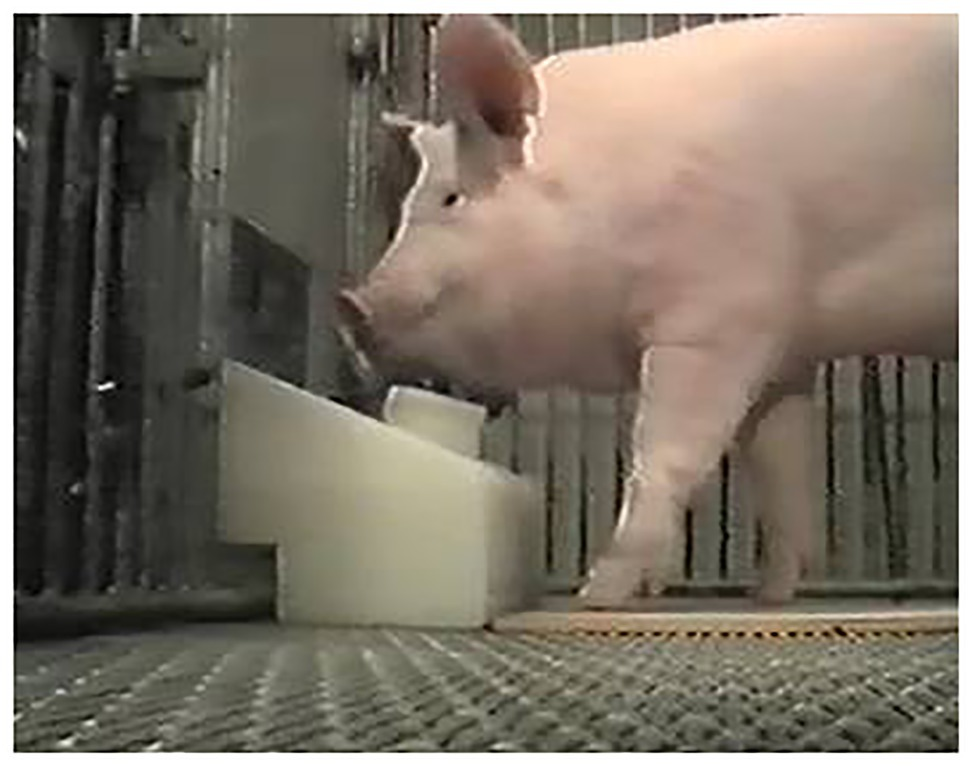
Joystick on the left when in use

In 1996, a scientific study established that both chimpanzees and rhesus monkeys could be taught to move a pointer on a screen by using a joystick. Both have consistently managed to demonstrate "conceptual knowledge" of the task required of them during trials, although rhesus monkeys were notably slower to do so.

In 2021, another pair of researchers investigated the level of intelligence in domestic pigs by designing a joystick which could be controlled with their snout. Unlike the chimpanzees or the rhesus monkeys, none of the four pigs was able to fully meet the 1996's test criteria for "motoric or conceptual acquisition" of the task, but they still performed "significantly above chance". Notably, the pigs experienced additional difficulties in comparison to the primates, as they were all far-sighted and so may have struggled with the details on screen, and they could not move the target with a joystick without taking their eyes off the screen first.

== See also ==
- 3D CAD motion controllers like the Spacemouse or Spaceball
- Aircraft flight control system
- The Arcade (joystick)
- Flight simulator
- Game controller
- Gamepad
- Glossary of computer hardware terms
- Gravis PC GamePad
- Kempston joystick
- TAC-2
- Trackball
- Yoke (aircraft)
