= List of Nintendo controllers =

The following is a list of video game controllers created for Nintendo consoles.

== Color TV Game 15 ==
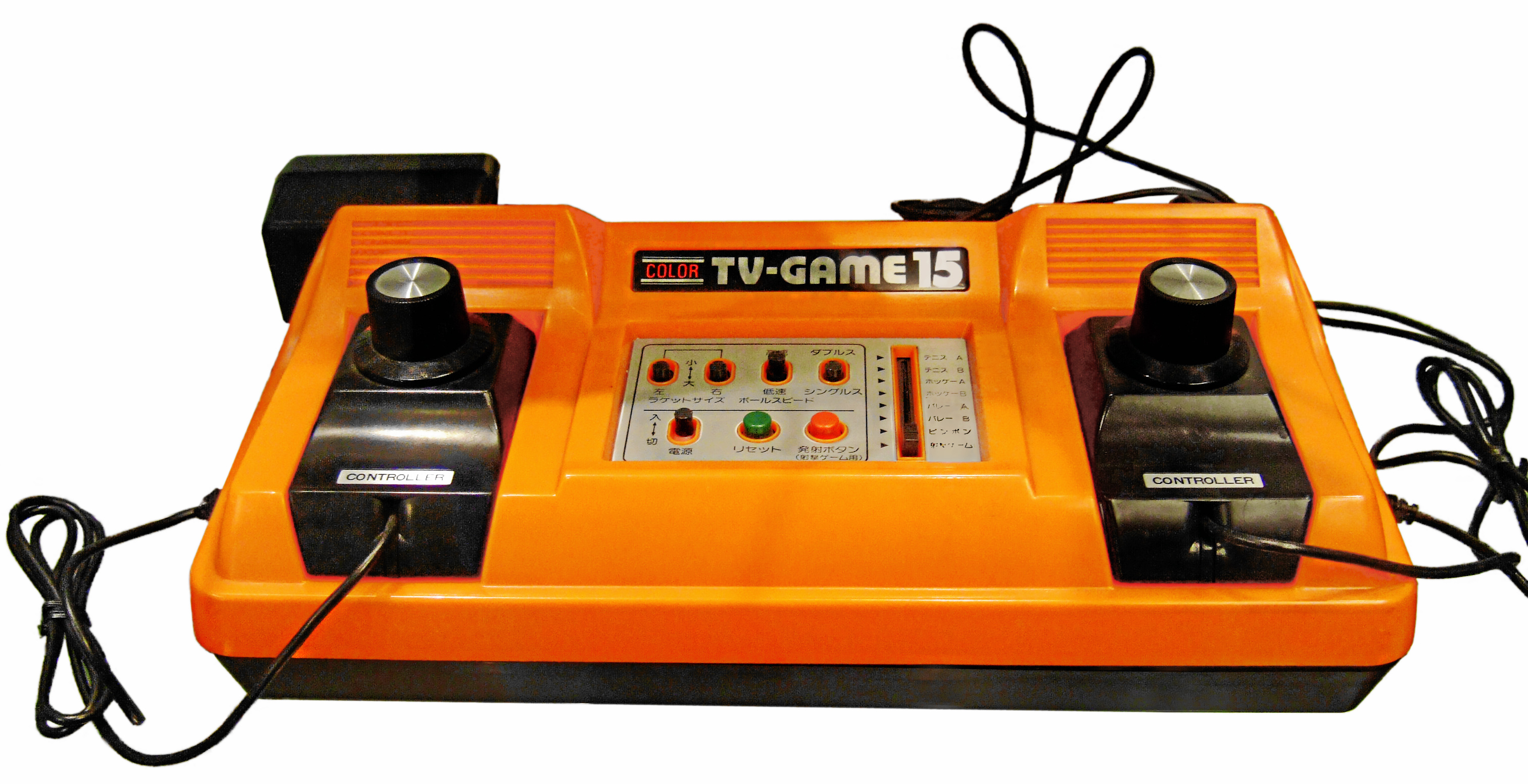
Color TV Game 15 console

The Color TV Game 15 system was Nintendo's first system which had controllers. These controllers came in the form of two paddles connected to the console with cables. The controls on these paddles consisted of a simple dial in order to control the on-screen paddles in the system's built in game library.

== Nintendo Entertainment System ==
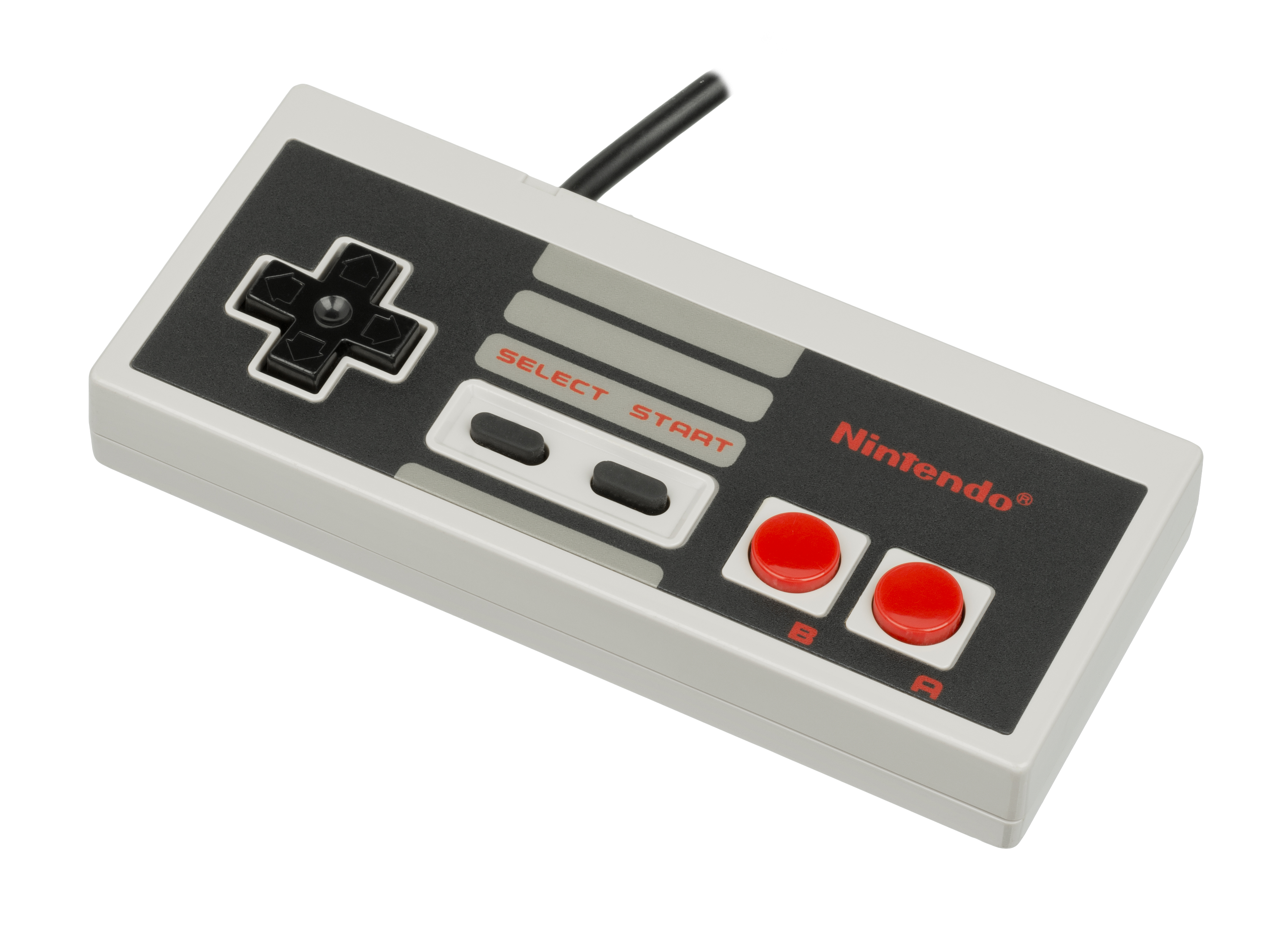
A Nintendo Entertainment System controller

The Nintendo Entertainment System controller is an oblong brick-like design with a simple four button layout. It consists of two round buttons labeled "A" and "B", a "START" button, and a "SELECT" button. Additionally, the controllers utilized the cross-shaped joypad, designed to replace bulkier joysticks used in earlier gaming consoles’ controllers. The NES controller could also be unplugged as the NES featured two custom 7-pin ports on the front of the console.

== Super Nintendo Entertainment System ==
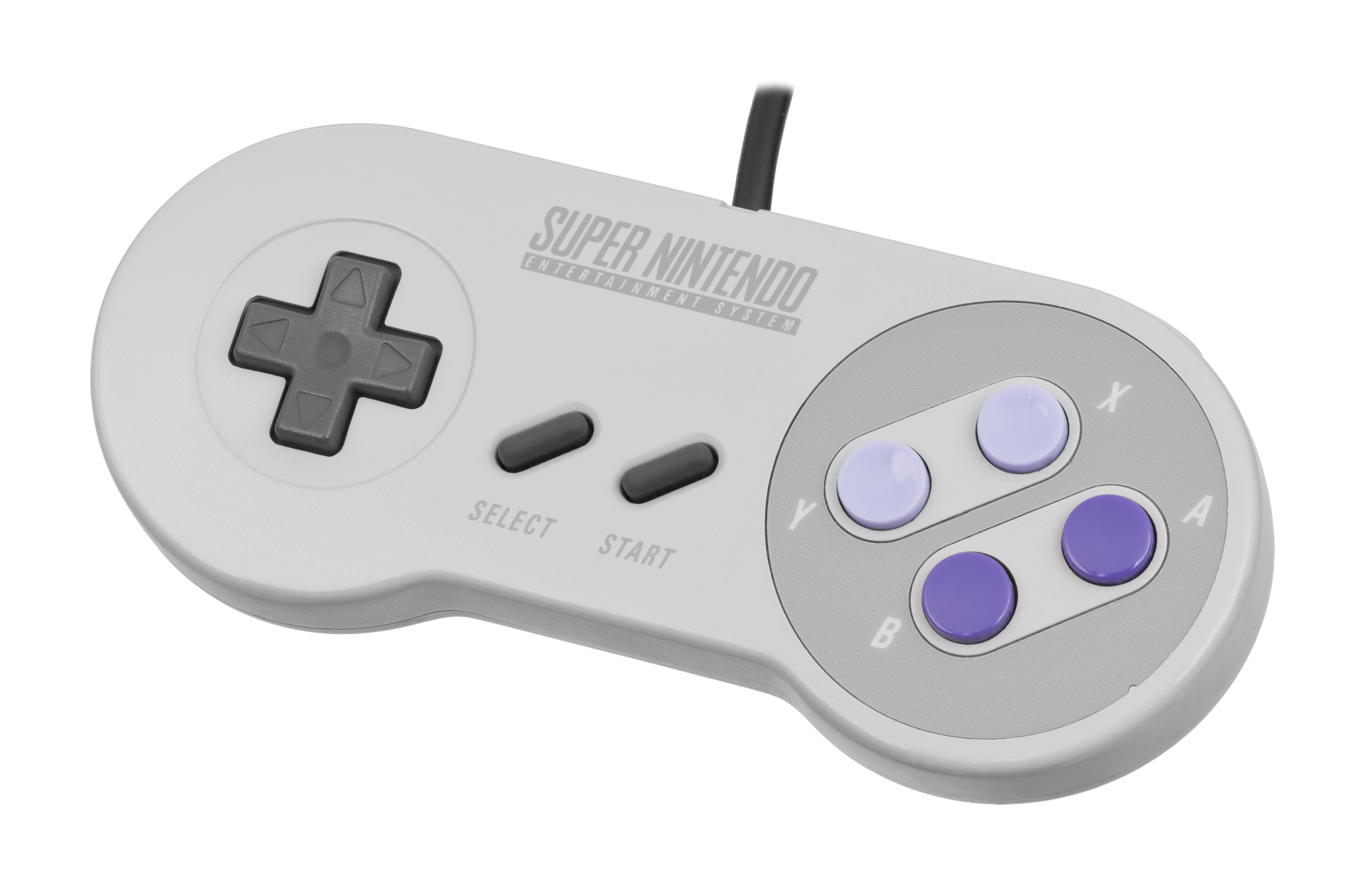
The North American SNES controller

The controller used for the SNES introduces two additional face buttons: X and Y. The four face buttons on the right side are arranged in a diamond shape. Two shoulder buttons are also added and is more ergonomic over the NES controller. The controller was designed by Lance Barr. The Japanese and PAL region versions incorporate the colors of the four action buttons into the system's logo. The North American version's buttons are colored as follows: the X and Y buttons are lavender with concave faces, and the A and B buttons are purple with convex faces. Several later consoles derive elements of their controller design from the SNES, including the PlayStation, Dreamcast, Xbox, and Wii Classic Controller.

== Virtual Boy ==
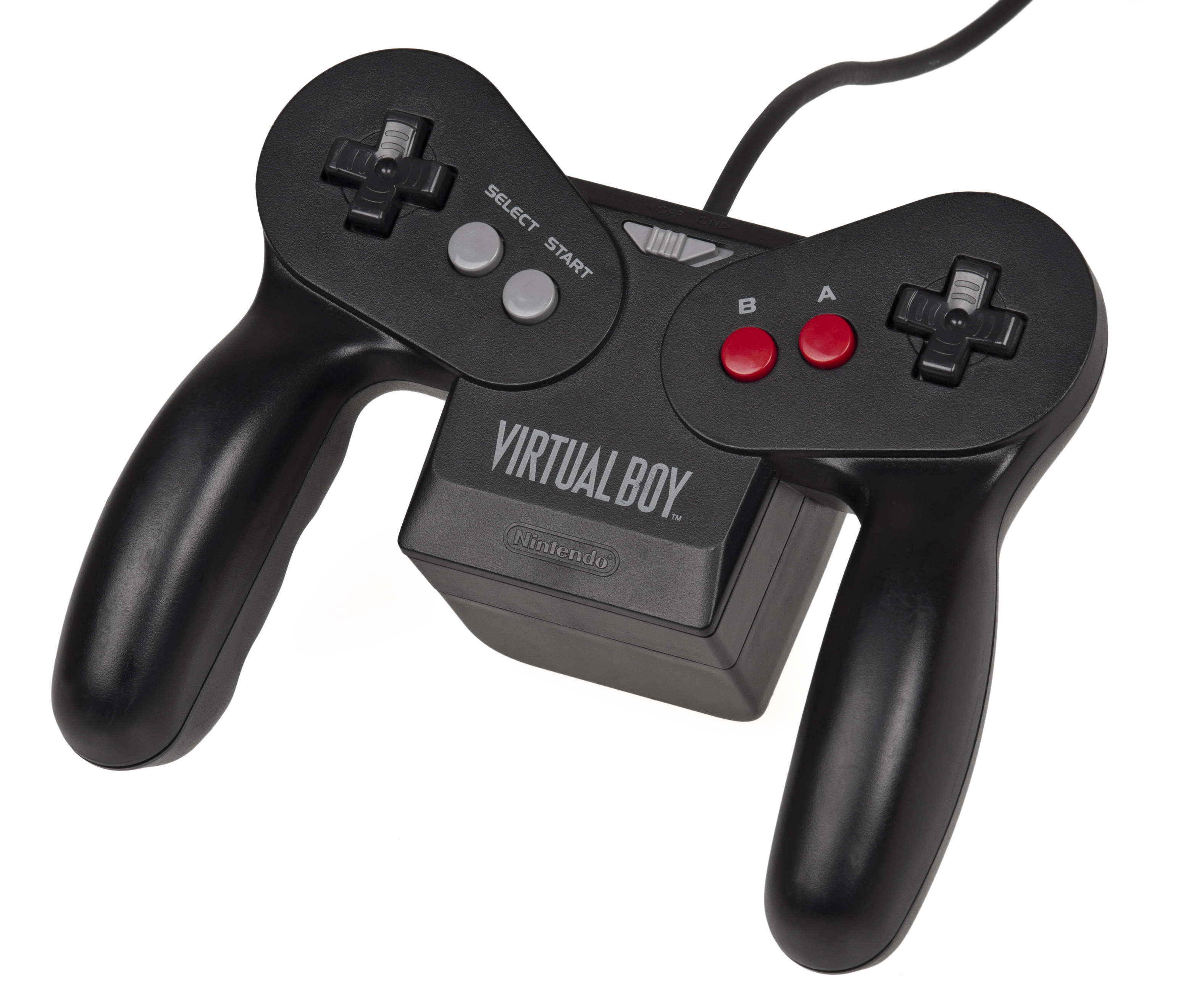
Virtual Boy controller with battery pack

The controller for the Virtual Boy has 4 surface buttons: select, start, B, and A. The face also includes dual directional-pads meant to be used for controlling games in a 3D space. Finally, two small shoulder buttons are placed on the back of the controller's grips and the system's power button is placed in the center of the controller. The Virtual Boy system is powered by 6 AA-batteries held in the battery pack on the controller or by an AC power adapter which also connects to the back of the controller. Additionally, the power cable used in the power adapter is the same power cable and power supply used for the Super Nintendo Entertainment System. While the Virtual Boy controller differs greatly in design from Nintendo's other controllers, the directional pads closely resemble the directional pad of the Game Boy but larger and with a steeper slope inwards. Since the Virtual Boy was designed for single player use, the system only has a single controller port on the underside of the console. Due to this single port, the Virtual Boy only ever sold with one controller per unit.

== Nintendo 64 ==
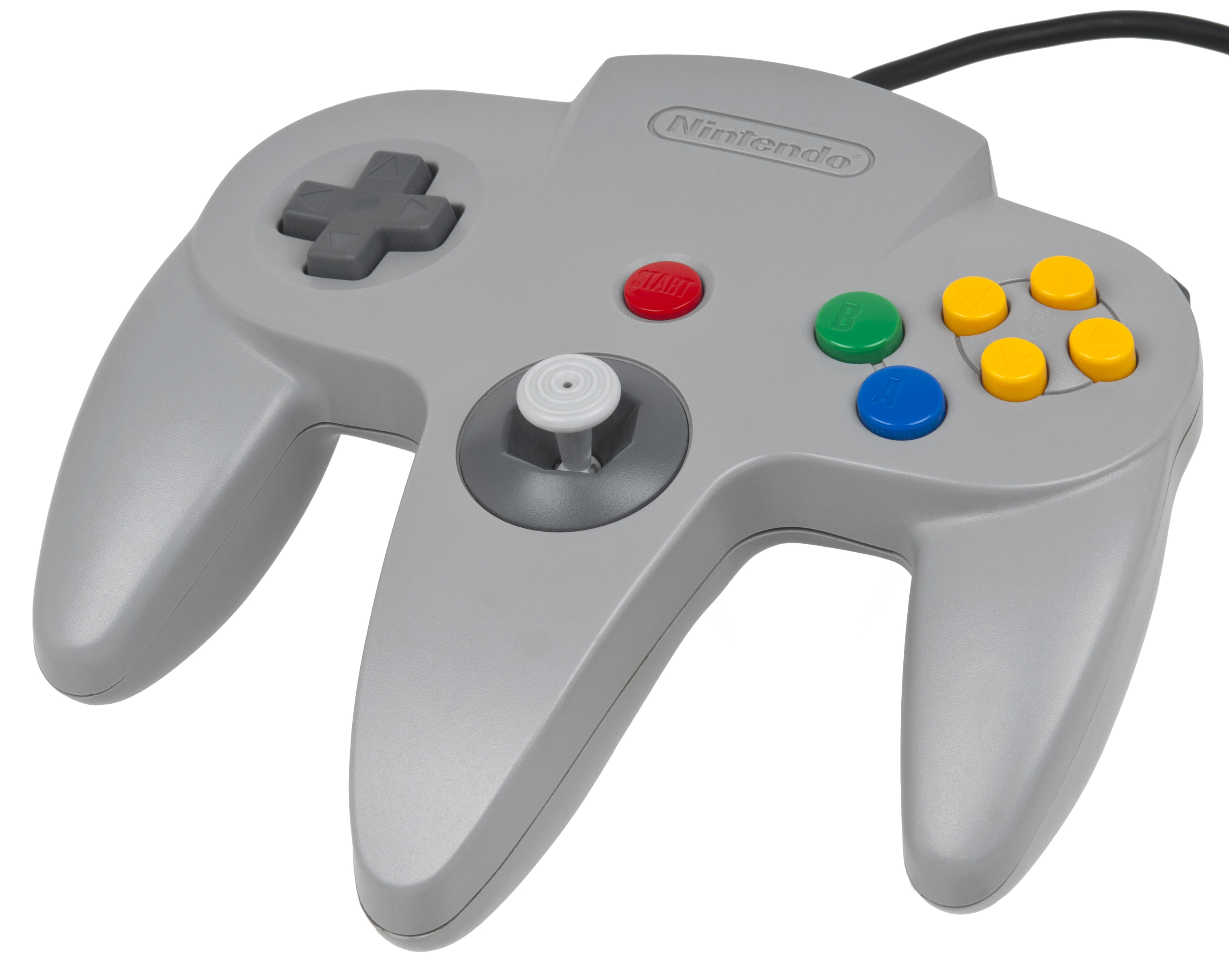
A gray Nintendo 64 controller

The Nintendo 64 controller is Nintendo's fifth generation controller and features ten buttons, an analog control stick, and a directional pad. The controller is in the shape of an "M", and was designed to be held in three different positions. First, it can be held by the two outer grips, allowing use of the D-pad, right-hand face buttons and the "L" and "R" shoulder buttons (but not the "Z" trigger or analog stick). It can be also held by the center and right-hand grip, allowing the use of the single control stick, the right-hand buttons, the "R" shoulder button, and the "Z" trigger on the rear (but not the "L" shoulder button or D-pad). Finally, the controller can be held by the center and left-hand grip, allowing for a combination of the D-pad, L-shoulder, analog stick and Z button (but not the "R" shoulder button or right-hand buttons).

The design is versatile, but it is also controversial because a player is unable to access all the buttons with the player's hands in any one position. Accessing all buttons would require the player to switch hand positions. The controller also includes four "C buttons" on the top, which were originally intended to control the camera in the N64's three-dimensional environments. However, since the pad only contains three other face buttons, the C-buttons often became assigned to ulterior functions.

== GameCube ==
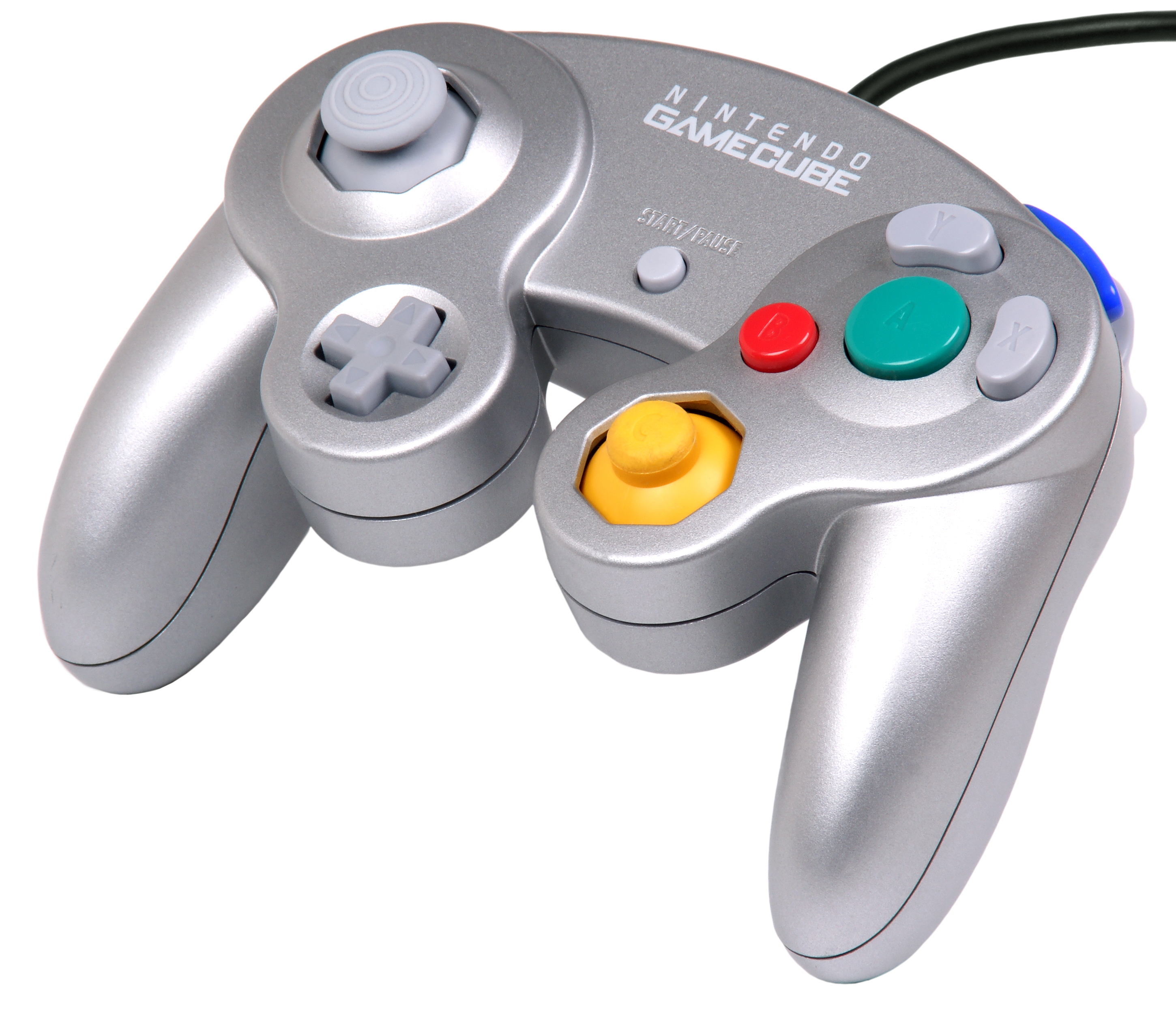
A silver GameCube controller

The GameCube controller is Nintendo's sixth generation controller, released along with the GameCube in 2001. The standard GameCube controller has a wing grip design and features a total of six digital buttons, two analog sticks, a d-pad and two hybrid analog triggers/digital buttons.

The primary analog stick is on the left, with the D-pad below it. The four main face buttons are to the right of the controller. The face buttons include a large green "A" button in the center, a smaller red "B" button to its bottom left and the kidney-shaped "X" and "Y" buttons to the right and top of the "A" button, respectively. There is also a yellow "C" stick below the main face buttons. A Start/Pause button is located in the middle of the controller. On the shoulders of the controller there are two analog triggers marked "L" and "R," as well as a "Z" button above the "R" trigger.

The standard GameCube controller provides haptic feedback by way of a built-in rumble motor rather than using an external Rumble Pak add-on like the Nintendo 64 controller.

There is also a WaveBird Wireless Controller and a set of DK Bongos.

== Wii ==
=== Wii Remote ===
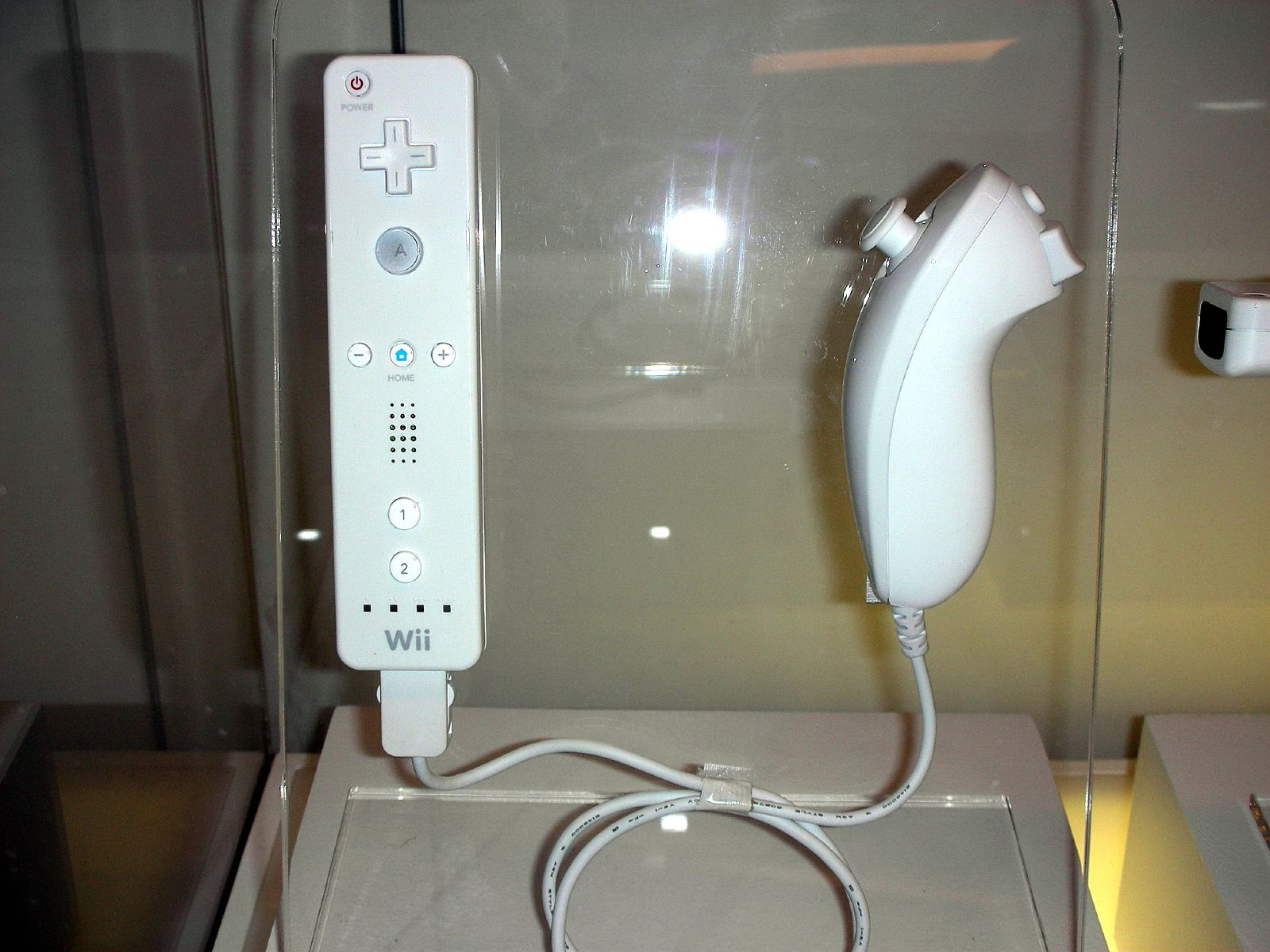
A Wii Remote and Wii Nunchuk

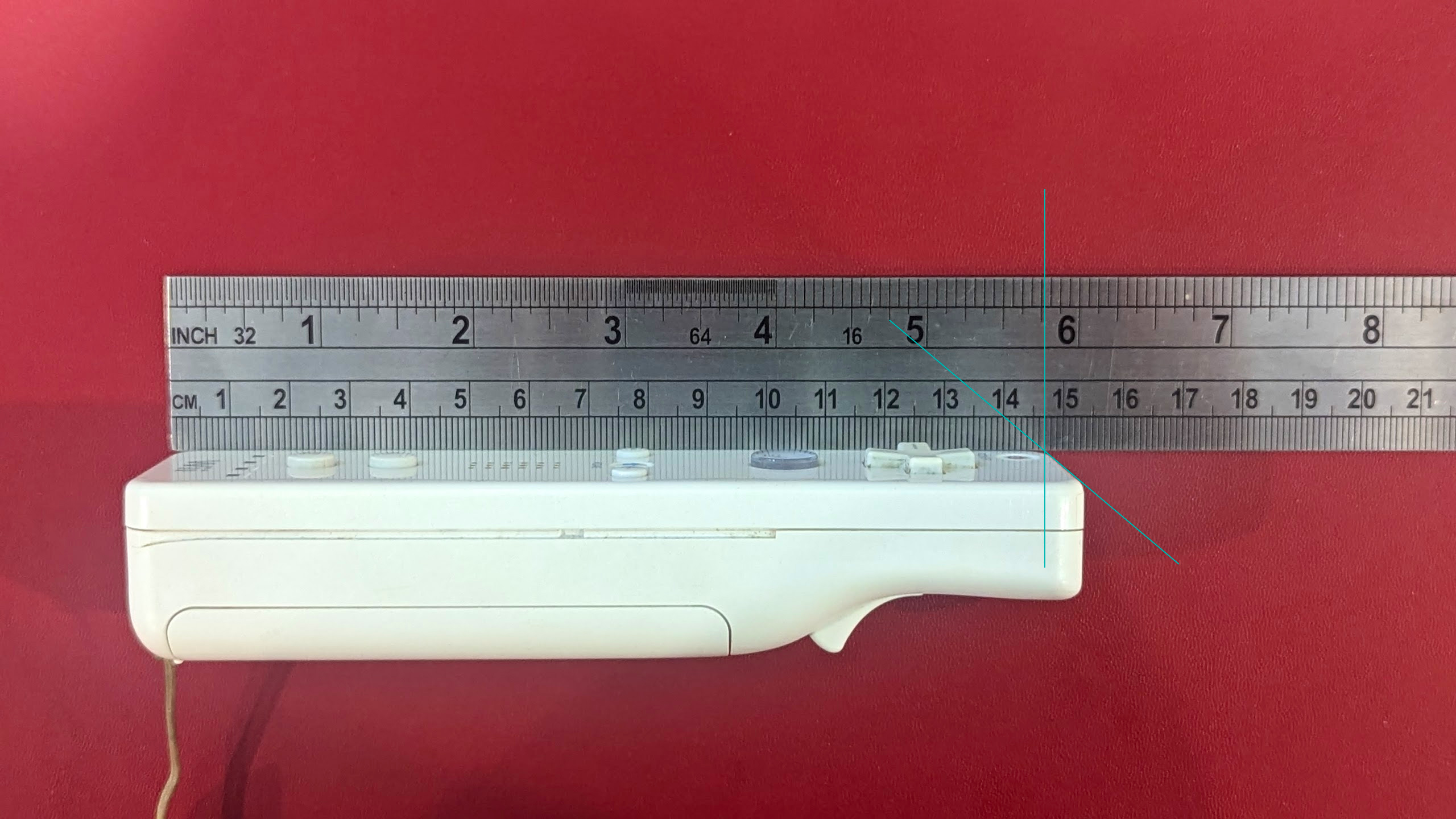
Nintendo Wii controller length: 148 mm (5.8 in)

The Wii Remote ditches the traditional gamepad controllers of previous gaming consoles for a one-handed remote control-based design. This was done to make motion sensitivity more intuitive, as a remote design is more optimal for pointing. Another goal with this design was to help the Wii appeal to a broader, non-gamer audience. The body of the Wii Remote measures 5.82 in (148 mm) long, 36.2 mm (1.43 in) wide, and 30.8 mm (1.21 in) thick. The controller communicates wirelessly with the console via short-range Bluetooth radio, with which it is possible to operate up to four controllers as far as 10 meters (approx. 30 ft) away from the console. However, to utilize pointer functionality, the Wii Remote must be used within five meters (approx. 16 ft) of the Sensor Bar. The controller's symmetrical design allows it to be used in either hand. The Wii Remote can also be turned horizontally and used like a Famicom/NES controller or steering wheel.

The Wii Remote has a large "A" button in the front, and a curved "B" button in the back resembling a trigger. Under the "A" button is a plus and minus, and at the bottom of the remote is a "1" and "2" buttons. In the middle of the Wii Remote, between the plus and minus button is a small "home" button that resembling a home/house. There are also blue LEDs indicating player number that are labeled using small Braille-like raised dots instead of Arabic numerals, with "1" being "•", "2" being "••", "3" being "•••", and "4" being "••••".

The blue LEDs also show how much battery power remains on the Wii Remote. By pressing any button, besides the power button while the controller is not being used to play games, a certain number of the four blue LEDs will light up, showing the battery life: four of the LEDs flash when it is at, or near, full power. Three lights flash when it is at 75%, two lights when at 50%, and one light flashes when there is 25% or less power remaining.

The Wii Remote also features an expansion port at the bottom which allows various functional attachments to be added. The most popular attachments are the Wii Nunchuk and Classic Controller. The Nunchuk connects to the Wii Remote via a cord that is about 1 to 1.2 m (3.3 to 3.9 ft) long. It features an analog stick similar to the one found on the GameCube controller and two trigger buttons (oval-shaped "C" and rectangle-shaped "Z") and works in tandem with the main controller in many games (including Mario Kart Wii). The Classic Controller, which plugs into the expansion port, emulates the basic design of the SNES controller. It is designed for use with the Virtual Console, but is also compatible with many standard Wii games.

=== Classic Controller ===
The Classic Controller (クラシックコントローラ, Kurashikku Kontorōra) is a game controller produced by Nintendo for the Wii home video game console. While it later featured some compatibility with the Wii U console, the controller was ultimately succeeded by the Wii U Pro Controller. In April 2014, Nintendo discontinued production of both the Classic Controller and Classic Controller Pro.

The Classic Controller is also compatible with the NES Classic Edition and Super NES Classic Edition.

== Wii U ==
In 2013, a year following the Wii U's release, a hacking website Hackaday found a way to use a Wii U Pro Controller and Wii U GamePad on PC.

=== GamePad ===
The Wii U GamePad

The Wii U GamePad is the standard controller for Nintendo's eighth generation video game console. It incorporates traits from tablet computers and also has traditional input methods, such as buttons, dual analog sticks, and a D-pad. It also features touchscreen and motion controls. The touchscreen can be used to supplement a game by providing second screen functionality or an asymmetric view of a scenario in a game. The screen can also be used to play a game strictly on the GamePad screen, without the use of a television display. Conversely, non-gaming functions can be assigned to it as well, such as using it as a television remote.

=== Pro controller ===
The Wii U Pro Controller is a video game controller produced by Nintendo for the Wii U video game console. It is available in Black and White. It is the successor to the Wii Classic Controller and has the same buttons but with the added features of a power button, and pressable analog sticks.

== Nintendo Switch ==
The main controllers usable on the Nintendo Switch include the Joy-Con and Nintendo Switch Pro Controller. In addition, Nintendo has also released the Poké Ball Plus controller, made for Pokémon: Let's Go and Pokémon Sword and Shield, and a Nintendo Switch GameCube Controller made for Super Smash Bros. Ultimate and Super Mario 3D All-Stars.

Nintendo also released revised variations of some of its previous controllers that are compatible with the Switch hardware, each of which includes wireless functionality, additional buttons for Switch-specific functions and an internal rechargeable battery. Thus far, these include Switch-compatible versions of the NES, Super NES, and Nintendo 64 controllers, released alongside catalogs of legacy titles for each of those systems made available through the Nintendo Switch Online service.

=== Joy-Con ===
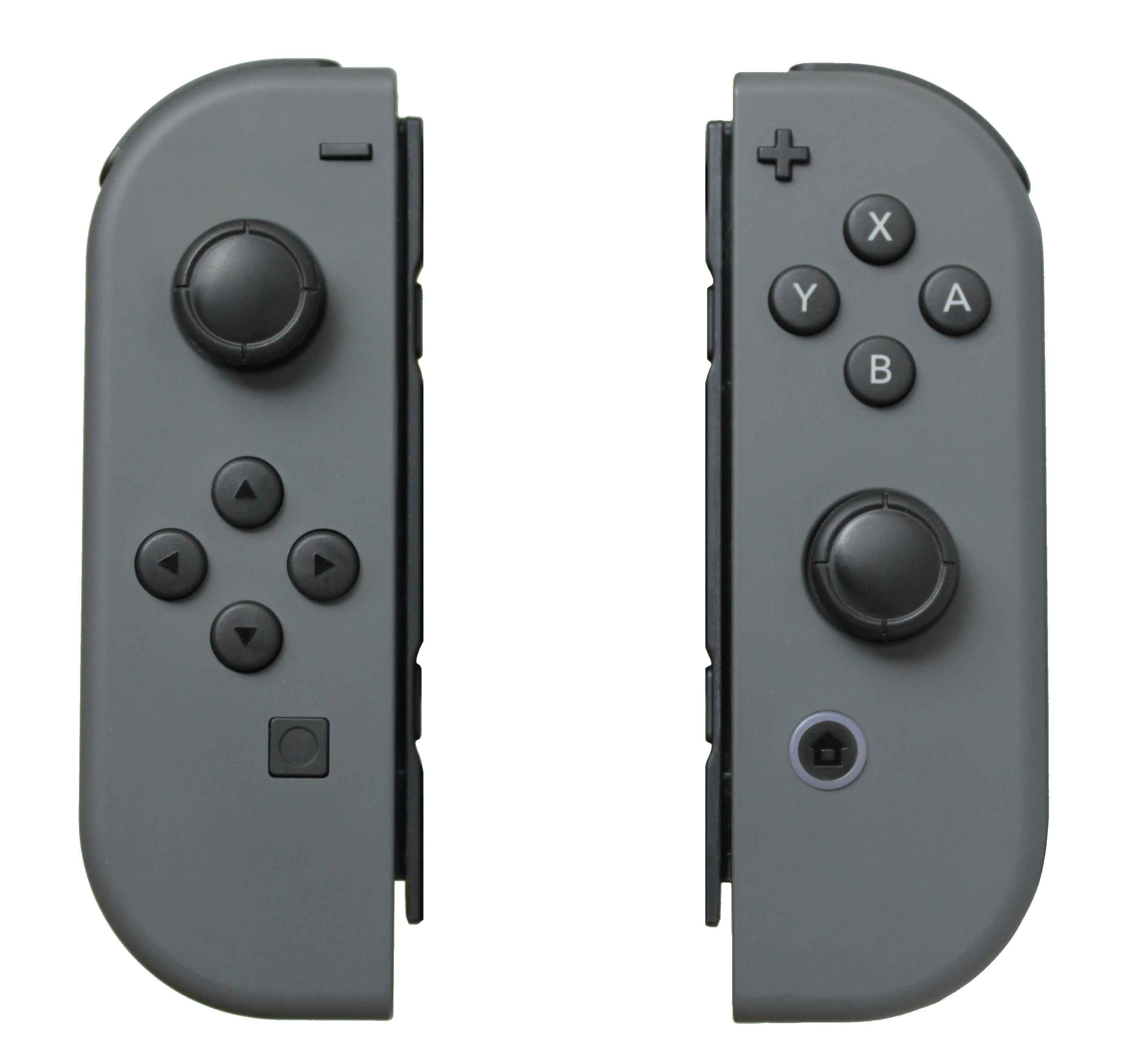
Detached grey Joy-Con

The Joy-Con are the primary controller(s) of the Nintendo Switch video game console. They consist of two individual units, each containing an analog stick and an array of buttons. They can be used while attached to the main Nintendo Switch console unit, or detached and used wirelessly. When detached, a pair of Joy-Con can be used by a single player, or divided between two as individual controllers. When the Joy-Con are removed from the console, two shoulder buttons, SL and SR, are revealed on the inner side of the railing. Notably, there is some controversy surrounding the quality of the joysticks used on the Joy-Con. Specifically, after extended use the joysticks often cease to sense certain directional inputs or sense directional inputs when none are given. This problem is colloquially known as Joy-Con drift.

=== Pro controller ===
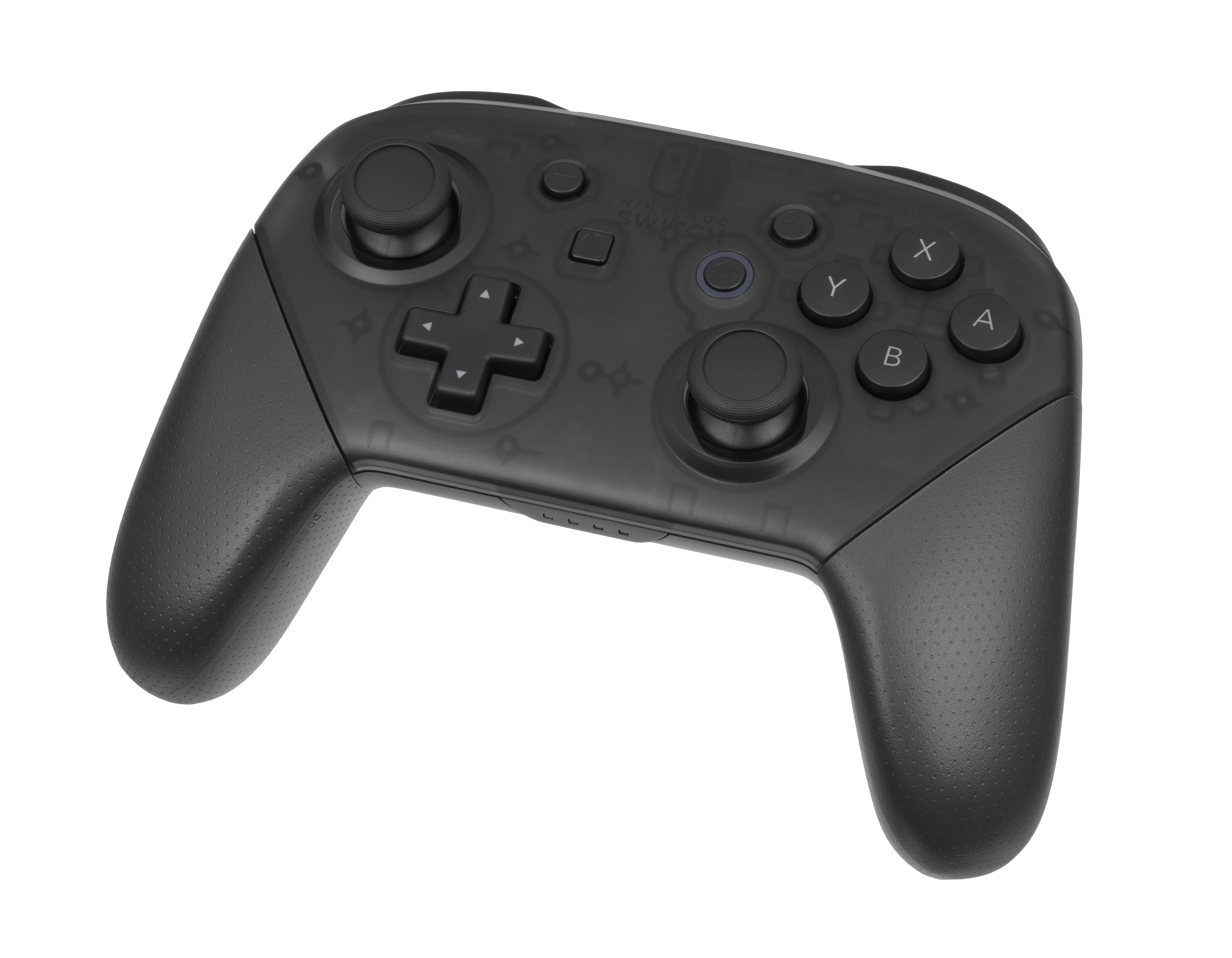
Nintendo Switch Pro Controller

The Nintendo Switch Pro Controller is a controller designed to work in conjunction with the Nintendo Switch. It is similar in design to the Wii U Pro Controller.

=== Poké Ball Plus ===
The Poké Ball Plus is a controller that is designed like the titular fictional object in the Pokémon media franchise. It improves the player's experience when capturing Pokémon. It features full functionality in Pokémon Go and Pokémon: Let's Go, Pikachu!, Pokémon: Let's Go, Eevee!, though its capabilities in Pokémon Sword and Shield are limited. This controller substitutes the ball's button for an analog stick that can be pressed inwards to function as the A button, while a hidden button atop the ball acts as the B button. It also contains motion sensors to simulate throwing the ball, HD Rumble feedback, and LEDs and speakers to mimic a Pokémon being caught.

== Nintendo Switch 2 ==
=== Joy-Con 2 ===
Joy-Con 2 are the primary controller(s) of the Nintendo Switch's successor, Nintendo Switch 2. An evolution on the Joy-Con, attach to the console using magnets instead of sliding in, and features improved buttons and a new "C" button located on the Joy-Con 2 R. Both Joy-Con 2 controllers may function as an optical mouse when slid along any surface on its connector side.

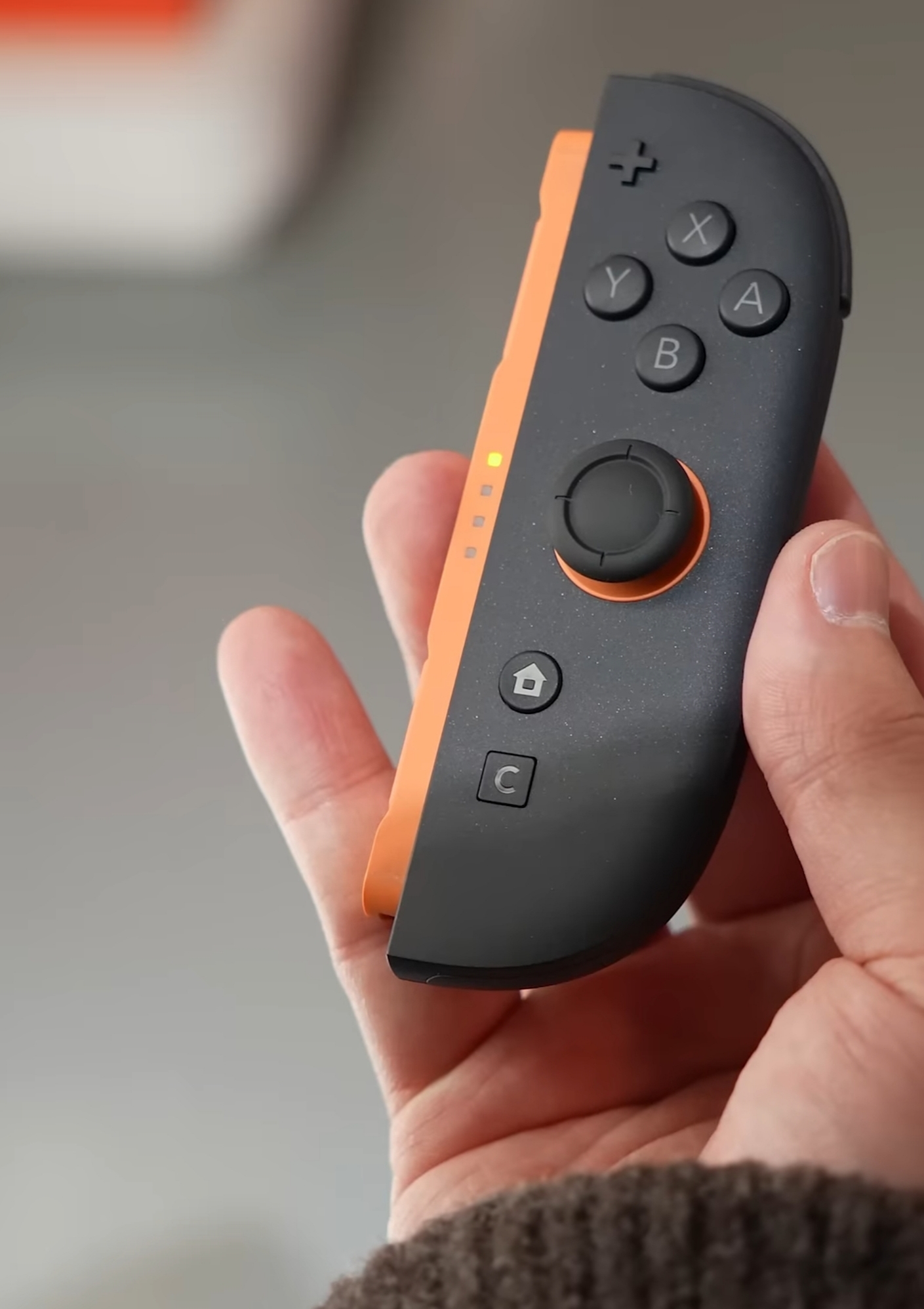
Close-up view of a right Joy-Con 2 controller, prominently showing the new "C" button

=== Pro controller ===
The Nintendo Switch 2 Pro Controller, just like the Joy-Con 2, comes with HD Rumble 2 and the new "C" button. It includes new remappable GL and GR buttons on the backside as well as an audio jack at the bottom. It has an MSRP of $90.
