= GameCube controller =

Primary game controller for the GameCube

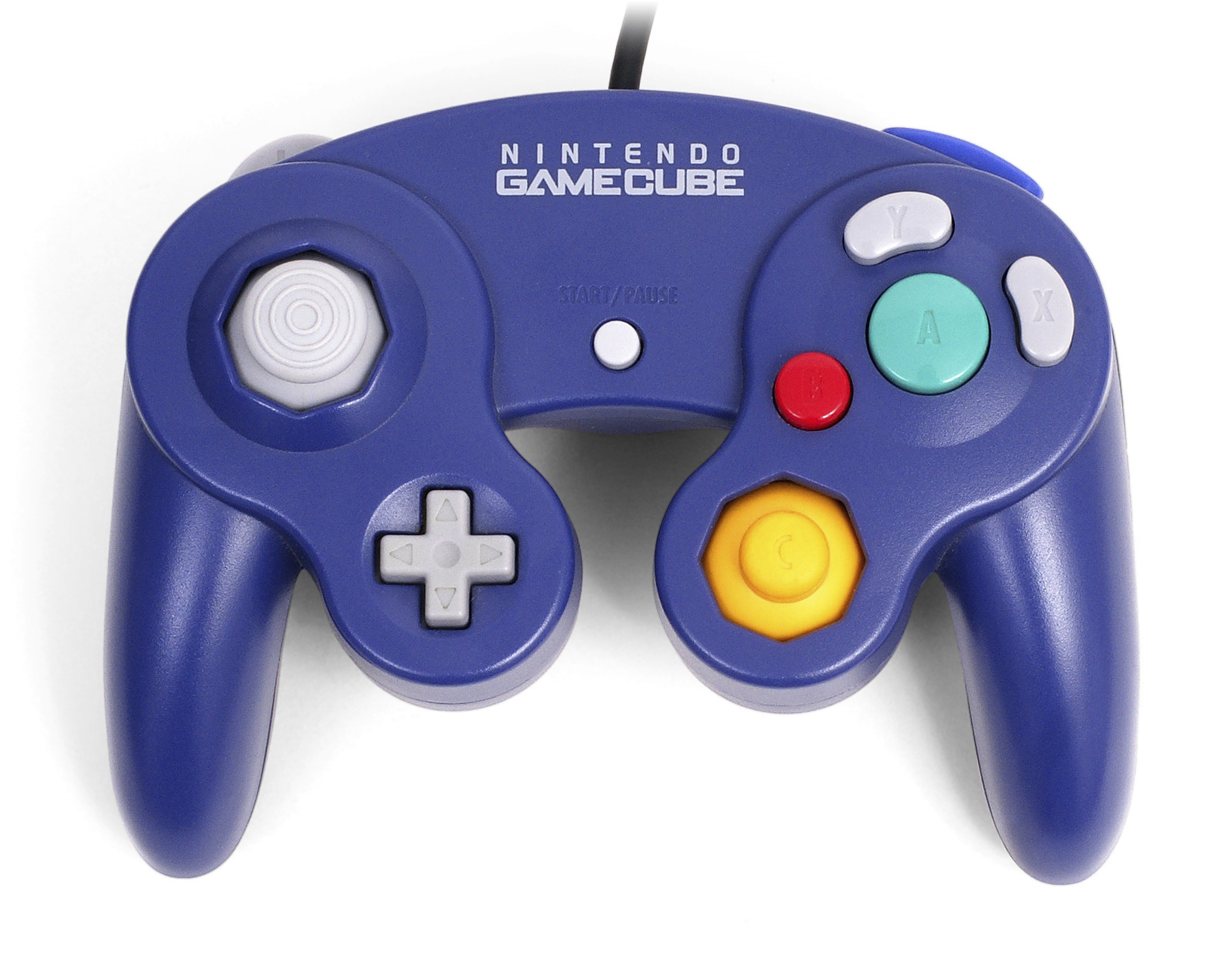
- Indigo GameCube controller
- Developer: Nintendo IRD
- Manufacturer: Nintendo
- Type: Gamepad
- Generation: Sixth
- Released: September 14, 2001: GameCube; JP: September 14, 2001; NA: November 18, 2001; EU: May 3, 2002; AU: May 17, 2002; Wii re-release; JP: April 2008; Wii U re-release; NA: November 21, 2014; EU: November 28, 2014; AU: November 29, 2014; JP: December 6, 2014; Nintendo Switch re-release; NA: November 2, 2018; JP: November 16, 2018; PAL: December 7, 2018
- Lifespan: 2001–2007
- Input: 2 × analog sticks; 2 × hybrid analog triggers/digital buttons; 6 × digital buttons (A, B, X, Y, Z, Start); Digital D-pad; Macro & turbo buttons (third-party GameCube controllers only)
- Connectivity: GameCube controller port
- Dimensions: 65 mm (2.6 in) × 140 mm (5.5 in) × 100 mm (3.9 in); 2 m (6 ft 7 in) cable
- Predecessor: Nintendo 64 controller
- Successor: Wii Remote and Nunchuk; Classic Controller

The GameCube controller (Note: Japanese: ゲームキューブコントローラ, Hepburn: Gēmukyūbu kontorōra) is the standard game controller for the GameCube video game console, manufactured by Nintendo and released in late 2001 in Japan and North America and 2002 in Europe and Australia. As the successor to the Nintendo 64 controller, it is the progression of Nintendo's controller design in numerous ways. The M-shaped design of its predecessor was replaced with a more conventional handlebar style controller shape; a second analog stick was added, replacing the C buttons with a C stick and the X and Y face buttons, last seen on the Super Nintendo Entertainment System controller, were reintroduced; the shoulder buttons were changed to hybrid analog triggers. A wireless variant of the GameCube controller known as the WaveBird was released in 2002.

Though many elements of the GameCube controller's unique design were not embraced by many future twin-stick gamepads (such as the hybrid shoulder buttons and a face button layout that emphasizes one button over three others), some controllers adopted its staggered analog stick layout. The GameCube controller continued to endure even beyond its system's launch cycle, gaining varying levels of support from its subsequent successor consoles. GameCube controllers are natively backward-compatible on the original model of the Wii console, which features dedicated ports for connecting said gamepads for use in either GameCube or supported Wii games.

Years after the GameCube's discontinuation, Nintendo officially re-issued the controller and produced dedicated adapters, coinciding with the releases of Super Smash Bros. for Wii U in 2014 and Super Smash Bros. Ultimate for Nintendo Switch in 2018, honoring the enduring popularity of the GameCube controller in the Super Smash Bros. community after the release of the critically acclaimed Super Smash Bros. Melee in 2001, which made the controller desirable for competitive play. A redesigned iteration of the controller for use with the Nintendo Classics service on Nintendo Switch 2 released with the console on June 5, 2025.

== Overview ==
Released alongside the GameCube console, the standard GameCube controller has a wing grip design. This controller was bundled with all new GameCube systems throughout the console's life cycle and was also available separately. It connects to the console's controller ports via a 2 m (6 ft 7 in) cable.

The standard GameCube controller provides haptic feedback by way of a built-in rumble motor rather than using an external Rumble Pak add-on like the Nintendo 64 controller. Also unlike its predecessor, it does not feature any expansion capabilities.

Standard GameCube controller layout, with WaveBird controller shape overlaid

The controller features a total of six digital buttons, two staggered analog sticks, a directional pad and two hybrid analog and digital triggers. The primary analog stick is on the left, with the D-pad below it. The four face buttons are on the right side of the controller with a large green A button in the center, flanked by a smaller red B button to its bottom left and two kidney-shaped buttons to its right (X) and top (Y); below the face buttons is a yellow C stick. A Start/Pause button is located in the middle of the controller. On the "shoulders" of the controller are two pressure-sensitive analog triggers marked L and R, as well as one digital button marked Z which sits in front of the R trigger. The L and R triggers feature both analog and digital capabilities: each behaves as a typical analog trigger until fully depressed, at which point the button "clicks" to register an additional digital signal. This method effectively serves to provide two functions per button without actually adding two separate physical buttons.

== Versions ==
=== Colors and designs ===
==== Standard editions ====
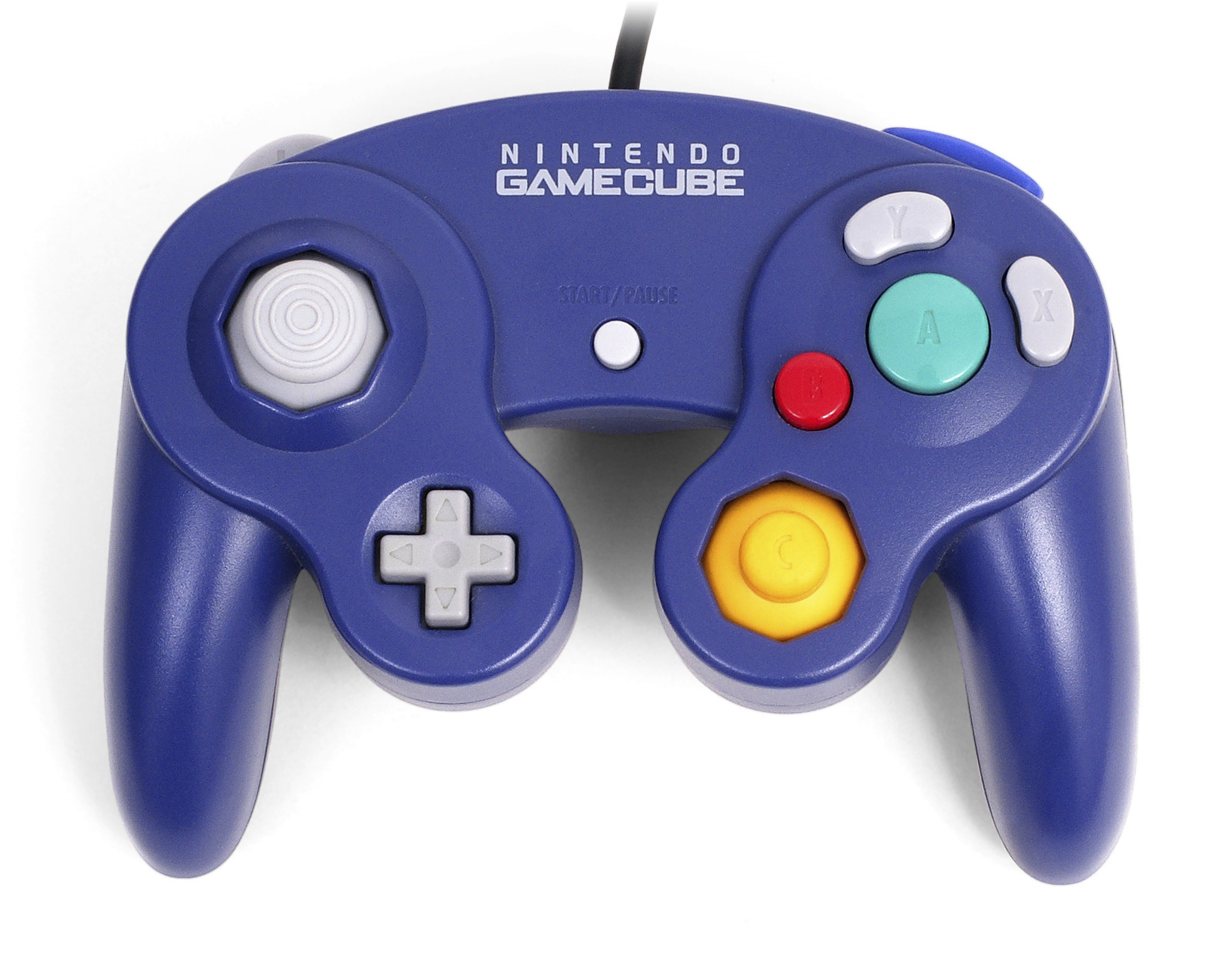
Indigo

Jet Black

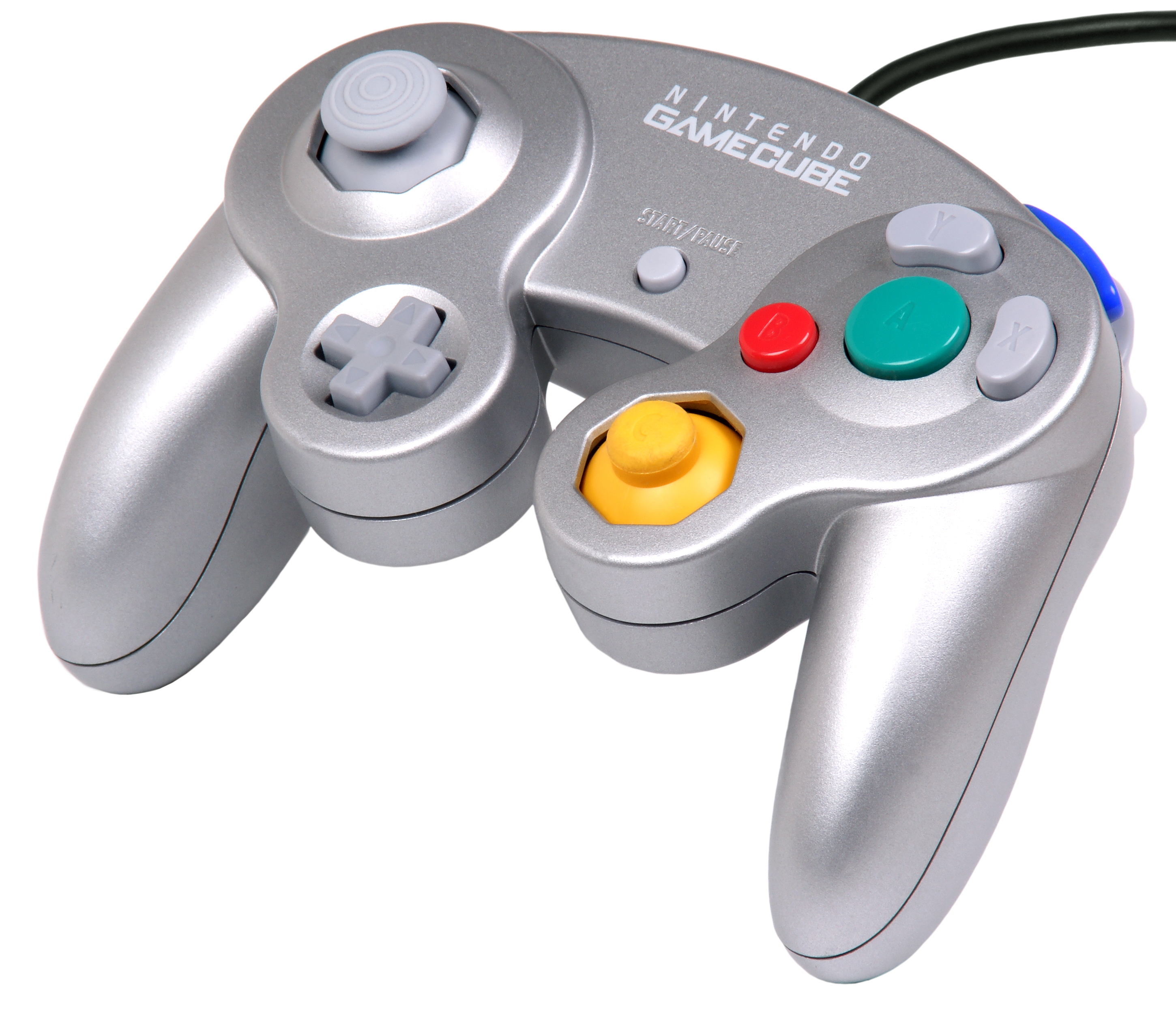
Platinum

Turquoise

Orange

White

The GameCube controller was sold in several different colors over the console's lifespan. Standard colors included "Indigo" (dark royal purple), "Jet Black", and "Platinum" (Silver), which were bundled with their respective colored GameCube consoles and sold separately in many countries. Other standard colors sold separately included "Spice" (Orange), "Indigo/Clear" (Indigo top with a clear translucent bottom), "Emerald Blue" (Turquoise), and White; the latter two colors were only available in Japan.

==== Limited editions ====
Nintendo released a number of limited edition controllers in Japan through Club Nintendo, which featured a unique color scheme and/or logo in the center. Club Nintendo controllers could be purchased for 500 points each and designs included "Mario" (red top and blue bottom), "Luigi" (green top and blue bottom), "Wario" (yellow top and purple bottom) and a "Club Nintendo" controller (white top and light blue bottom). The "Mario" design was also made available in limited quantities through the European Stars Catalogue for 5000 points.

A number of limited edition GameCube consoles have been released which included matching controllers. Colors released by Nintendo in Japan include "Starlight Gold", "Crystal White", "Symphonic Green" (mint green), "Hanshin Tigers" (black with Hanshin Tigers logo), "Gundam Copper" (two-tone red with Gundam logo), and "Transparent" which is in the "Enjoy Plus Pack +" bundle. The "Symphonic Green" color was also released in France. "Pearl White" was released in Europe, bundled with Mario Smash Football. A Resident Evil 4 controller (silver top and black bottom with logo) was available in Europe as part of a limited edition Resident Evil 4 console bundle. The Panasonic Q, a GameCube/DVD player hybrid exclusive to Japan, came bundled with a grey Panasonic branded version of the controller. The controller has the Panasonic logo on it instead of the Nintendo GameCube text.

=== WaveBird Wireless Controller ===
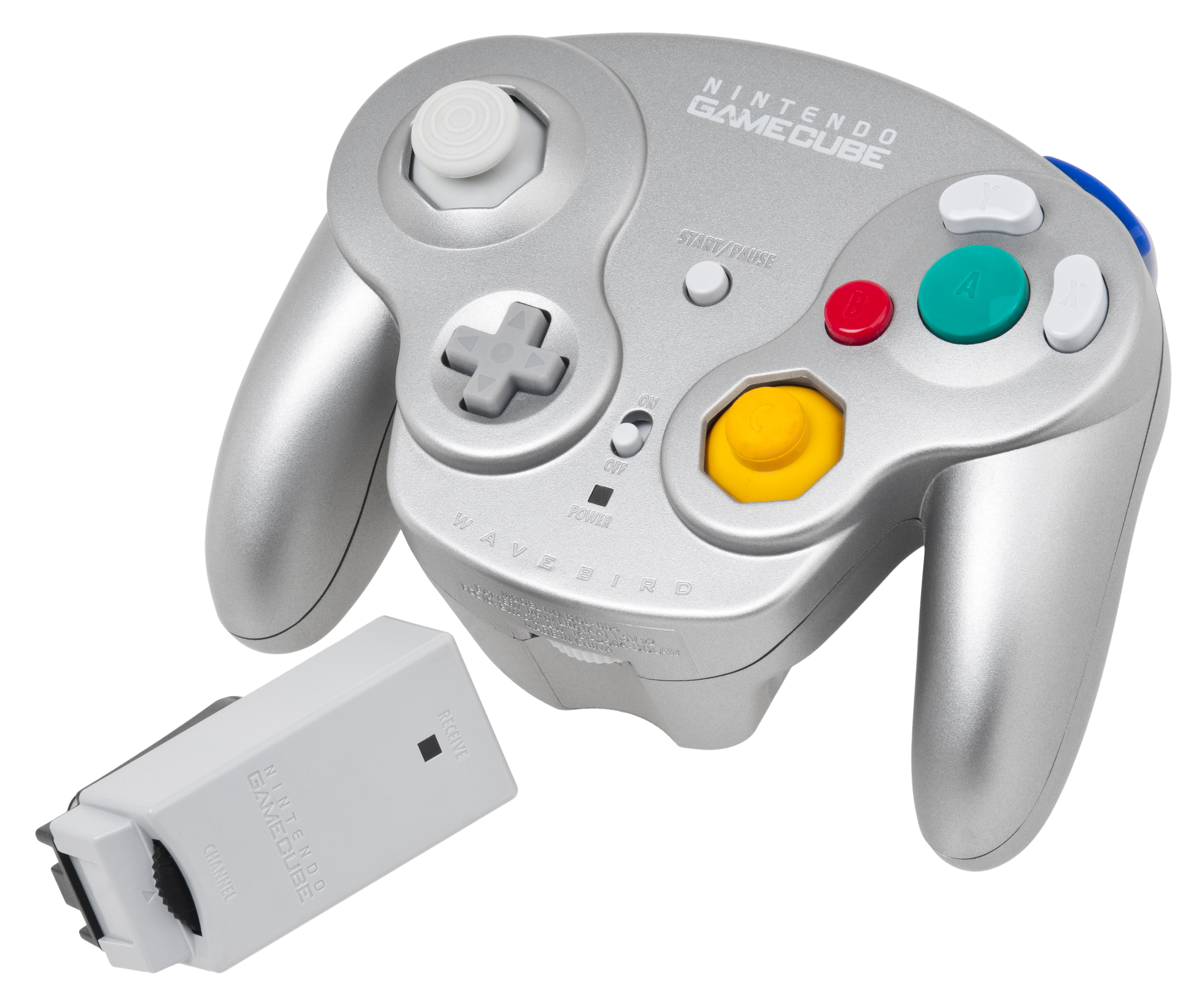
Platinum WaveBird controller with its receiver module

The WaveBird Wireless Controller, released in 2002, is a radio frequency-based Wireless controller based on the same design as the standard controller. It communicates with the GameCube console wirelessly through a receiver dongle connected to one of its controller ports. It is powered by two AA batteries. As a power-conservation measure, the WaveBird lacks the rumble function of the standard controller. The WaveBird came in two colors, gray and silver (Platinum).

=== LodgeNet controller ===
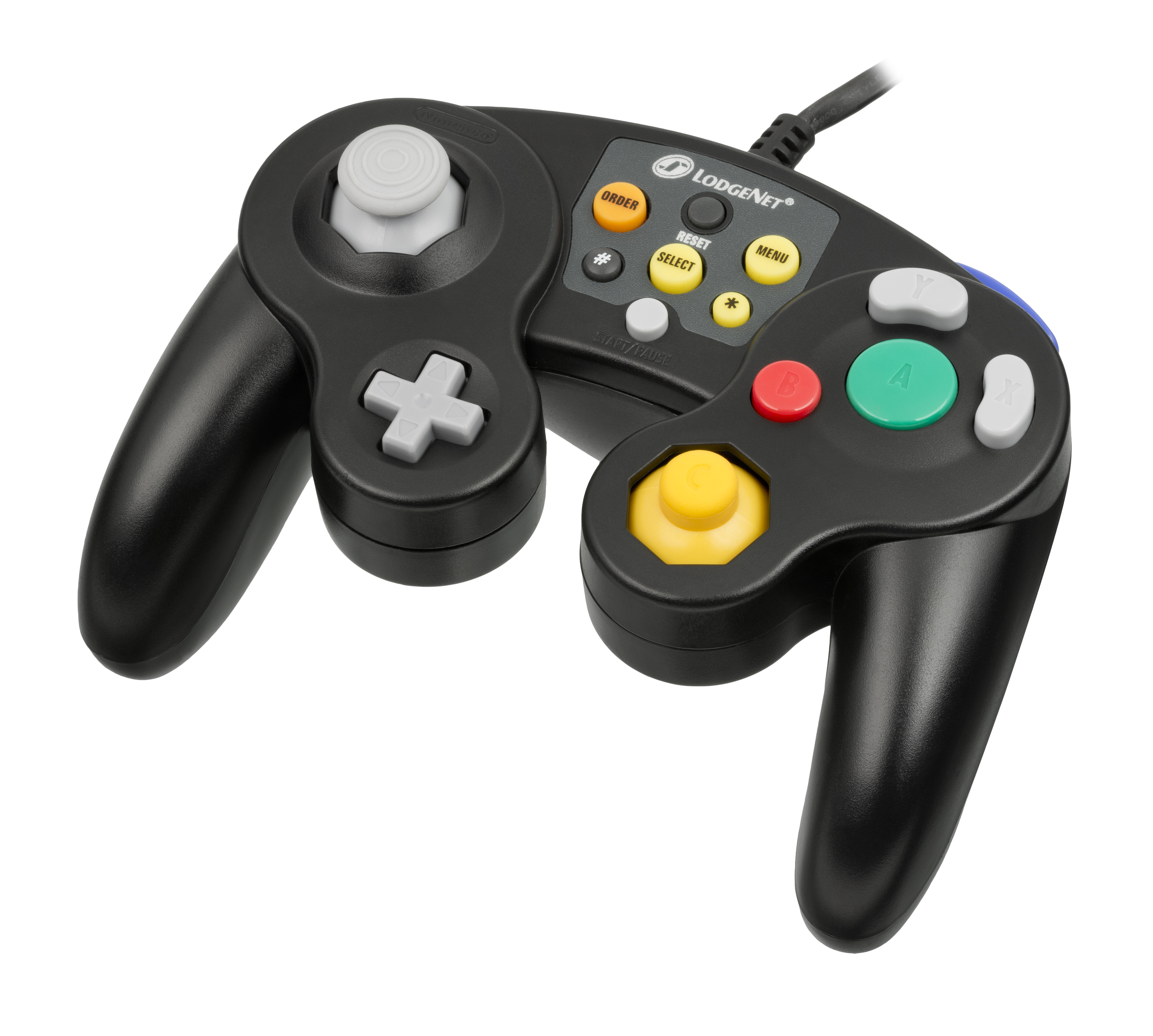
The LodgeNet GameCube controller

A specially designed variant of the GameCube controller was created for the LodgeNet in some North American hotels. The controller can be used for pay-per-play access to select GameCube games. In addition to the standard GameCube controller inputs, the LodgeNet controller also includes six additional buttons which are used to control the on-screen game selection interface. The controller cannot be used on regular GameCube hardware.

== Development ==
The Nintendo 64 controller, released in 1996, received mixed impressions, being lauded for standardizing the controls for 3D movement with its analog stick and for its comfortable design, but derided for its bulkiness and overall layout. Shigeru Miyamoto designed the GameCube controller in a span of at least three years—the longest he had spent on any controller at that time—with the goal being to accommodate as many people as possible, regardless of their age, the size of their hands, and whether they have any experience in playing video games with a gamepad. The controller had seen at least four or five versions during its development cycle, and each build would be radically different on a monthly basis, containing new ideas and discarding old ones.

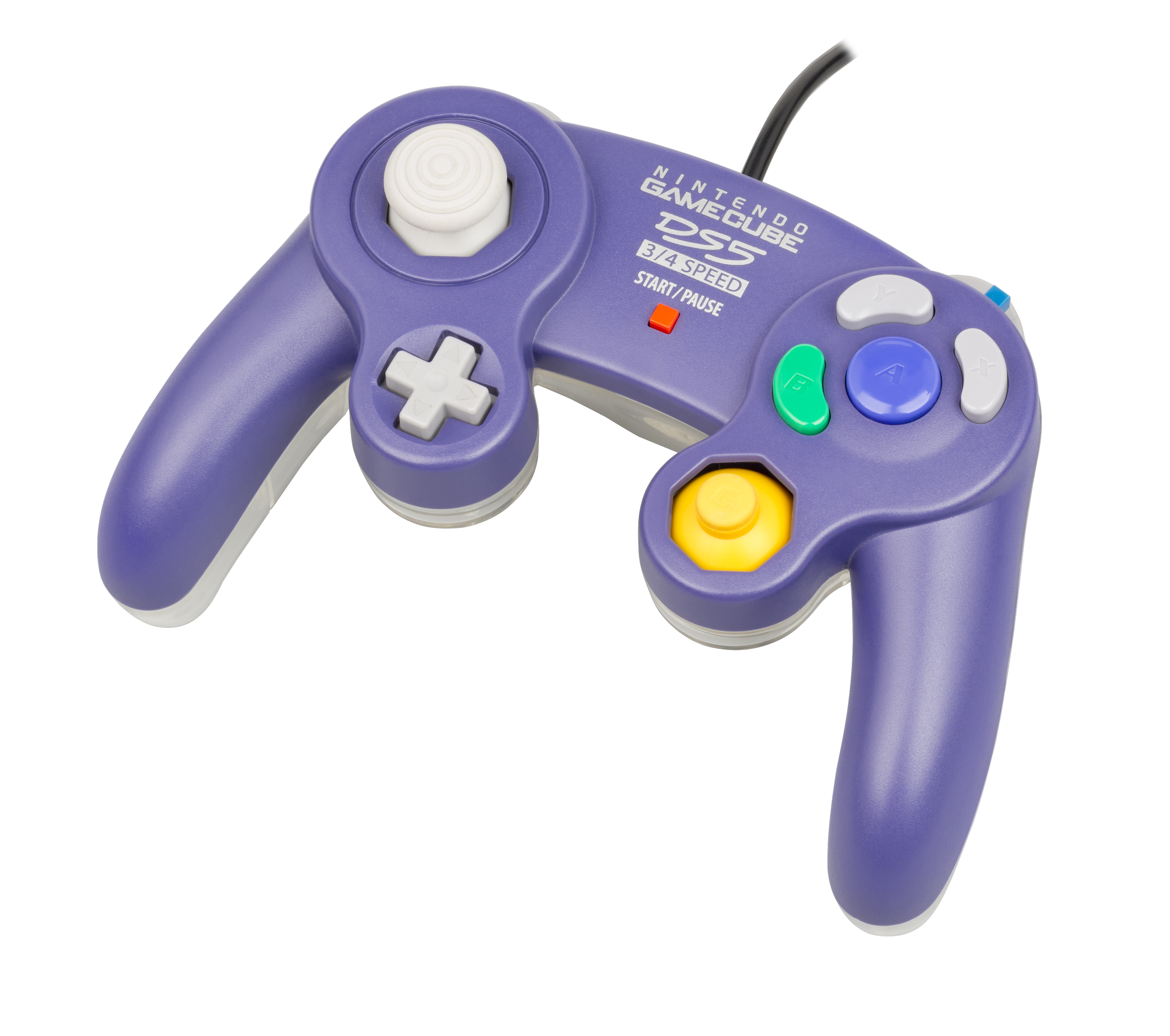
The prototype GameCube controller that was included with the development system, with its buttons adopting a color scheme similar to that of the Nintendo 64 controller

Miyamoto's first idea was to redesign the controller's four rhombus-positioned face buttons, a standard he had set when he designed the SNES controller. The green A button was made the largest to give the holder the idea that it performs the primary function. That button would be surrounded by a smaller red B button to the left and two colorless kidney-shaped Y and X buttons to the top and right, respectively. The B button was initially also kidney-shaped before it was made a circle. According to Ashida Kenichiro, one of the GameCube console's hardware designers, the controller was intended to be intuitive to the point where the player would forget they were holding it, but achieving that and adding many features proved difficult. As games transitioned to 3D graphics, Nintendo debated whether the controller needed a D-pad anymore. Ultimately, they settled on keeping it at the bottom right of the primary analog stick. They also settled on replacing the four C buttons with a second analog stick, and placed it on the bottom left of the face buttons. The player's thumbs were meant to naturally rest on the primary analog stick and the A button, from which the player can move them in a downward arc to reach the D-pad and secondary stick.

In a video published on its YouTube channel in December 2023, Masahiro Sakurai stated that while developing Super Smash Bros. Melee, he had suggested for a scroll wheel or jog dial to be implemented into the design of the controller. Sakurai supposed that a lack of space on the controller may explain why his idea wasn't implemented.

The GameCube controller was released to Japan on September 14, 2001; to North America on November 18; to Europe on May 3, 2002; and to Australia on May 17. It was made available in numerous colors to boost its sales, following the same course as the Nintendo 64 due to the latter's improved performance.

== Availability ==
While unlicensed third-party GameCube controllers have been on the market, they have been criticized for generally being made of lower quality components than Nintendo's official GameCube controllers. The official controllers have become scarce at retailers, as an increased demand of the controller started due to the Wii's backward compatibility with GameCube games and the fact that several Wii games support the controller as a primary method of control. In response to the regained popularity, Nintendo re-launched the GameCube controller. These relaunched models of the controller have a 3 m (9.8 ft) cable, longer than the original models 2 m (6 ft 7 in) cable. These relaunched models also lack the metal braces inserted inside the controller's triggers to help push the triggers down, something that most of the original 2001-2007 manufactured GameCube controllers do have. They also have a plastic stickbox for the two control sticks, something that Nintendo did in 2003 when they switched from metal to plastic stickboxes after resuming production of the GameCube at that time.

=== White controller ===
In April 2008, Nintendo released a white GameCube controller exclusively in Japan. It differs from previous editions in that it features a white cable which is 3 m (9.8 ft) long, rather than the 2 m (6 ft 7 in) black cable used on standard controllers. This model also lacks the metal braces inserted inside the L and R triggers (see above). This controller has not been released outside Japan, but online retailers such as Amazon and Play-Asia do import and sell the controller internationally.

In 2014, the manufacturing production of the white controller was resumed under the Super Smash Bros. branding, again exclusively in Japan.

=== Continued production of Platinum controller ===
Nintendo of America continued to produce and sell Platinum GameCube controllers until around early 2012 in North America.

=== Super Smash Bros. for Wii U Edition controller ===
The Super Smash Bros. edition controller was released in 2014, in conjunction with the release of Super Smash Bros. for Wii U. The controller features a metallic silver Super Smash Bros. logo surrounded by flames instead of the GameCube logo. It came in black worldwide, although a white version was released in Japan. The controller has the same length cable as the 2008 re-release and also lacks the metal braces inserted inside the triggers (see above).

Along with the release of the controller, Nintendo released a GameCube controller adapter for the Wii U. The adapter supports four GameCube controllers, and all original pads are supported. A second adapter can be hooked up to a console, allowing up to eight players to use a GameCube controller. The adapter is only officially compatible with Super Smash Bros. for Wii U and does not support any other Wii U software. Wii software running on the Wii U also does not support the adapter either.

=== Super Smash Bros. Ultimate Edition controller ===
During E3 2018, Nintendo confirmed it would re-issue the black GameCube controller for use with Super Smash Bros. Ultimate for the Nintendo Switch, as, like its Wii and Wii U predecessors, the game officially supports the GameCube controller. This controller has the same length cable as the 2008 and 2014 re-releases and also lacks the metal braces inserted inside the triggers (see above). The re-issued controller was released on November 2, 2018, and features a simplified variant Super Smash Bros. emblem design.

On the same day, Nintendo also re-released the official USB GameCube controller adapter, with a generic Nintendo embossed branding (unlike the first edition that featured the Wii U logo). It is identical to the one released for Wii U, and both adapters will work on either console. The Switch itself and its games are capable of supporting the GameCube controller in both docked and handheld mode after a system update issued in October 2017. Most Switch games recognize GameCube controllers as Pro Controllers. However, due to the lack of a minus button, the ZL button, clickable analogue sticks and motion sensors, players may have trouble playing games that use these features using a GameCube controller. The adapter is also compatible with GameCube games re-released via the Nintendo Classics service on Nintendo Switch 2.

== Use on subsequent consoles ==
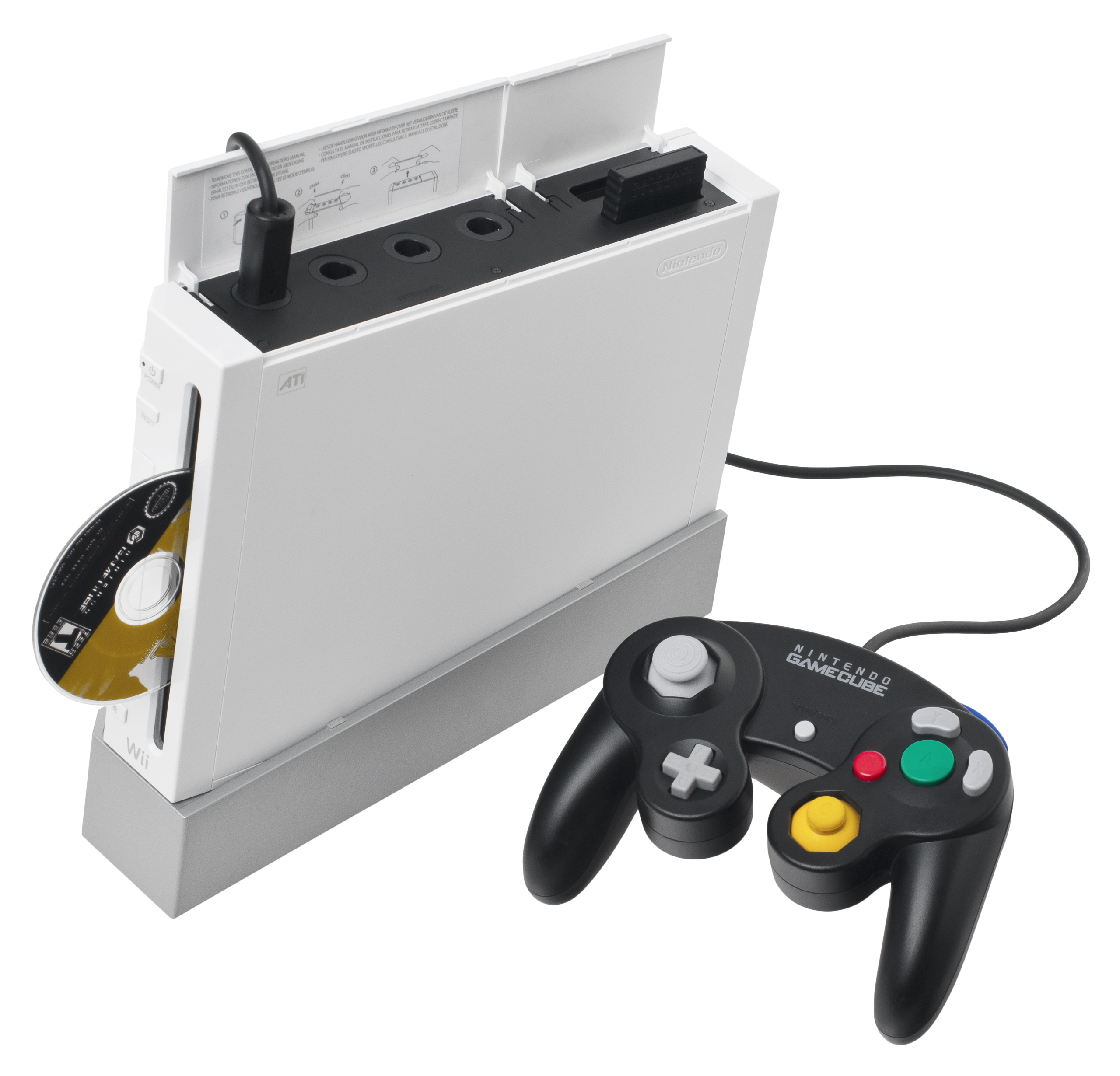
GameCube controller connected to a Wii

Due to the Wii's ability to use GameCube controller input, all official GameCube controllers can be used on the Wii. GameCube software played on the Wii requires the use of a GameCube controller. Wii software can be programmed to make full use of GameCube controllers. Nearly all Virtual Console games and certain Wii and WiiWare games have been designed to support GameCube controllers as input. However, some later Wii models, such as the Wii Family Edition and Wii Mini, lack support for GameCube software and accessories.

Although the subsequent console, the Wii U, omits compatibility with GameCube software and hardware, Nintendo announced that an official adapter would be released that allows the use of up to four GameCube controllers on the Wii U via USB. Though its initial product listing stated it would be compatible with any Wii U game that supports the Wii U Pro Controller, Nintendo since corrected the listing, stating the adapter can only be used with Super Smash Bros. for Wii U and would not be compatible with other Wii U or Wii software. The adapter launched alongside the game in November 2014, both separately and as part of a bundle with the game.

Support for the adapter on Nintendo Switch was introduced via its 4.0 firmware update. Though the Switch itself only supports it in docked mode, there are third-party accessories that allow it to connect in tabletop mode. Unlike the Wii U, it is supported by any game, although the Switch recognizes it as a Pro Controller and functionality may be affected if a game utilizes buttons not found on the GameCube controller. Super Smash Bros. Ultimate, Super Mario Sunshine (via Super Mario 3D All-Stars), and Grid Autosport are among the Switch games that recognizes them as a GameCube controller in-game. Additionally, the adapter is compatible with the Nintendo Switch 2 for use with the Nintendo Classics GameCube app, which gives customers access to a catalog of GameCube games. Similarly to the aforementioned Switch games, Kirby Air Riders recognizes the controller as a GameCube controller in-game.

=== Replications ===
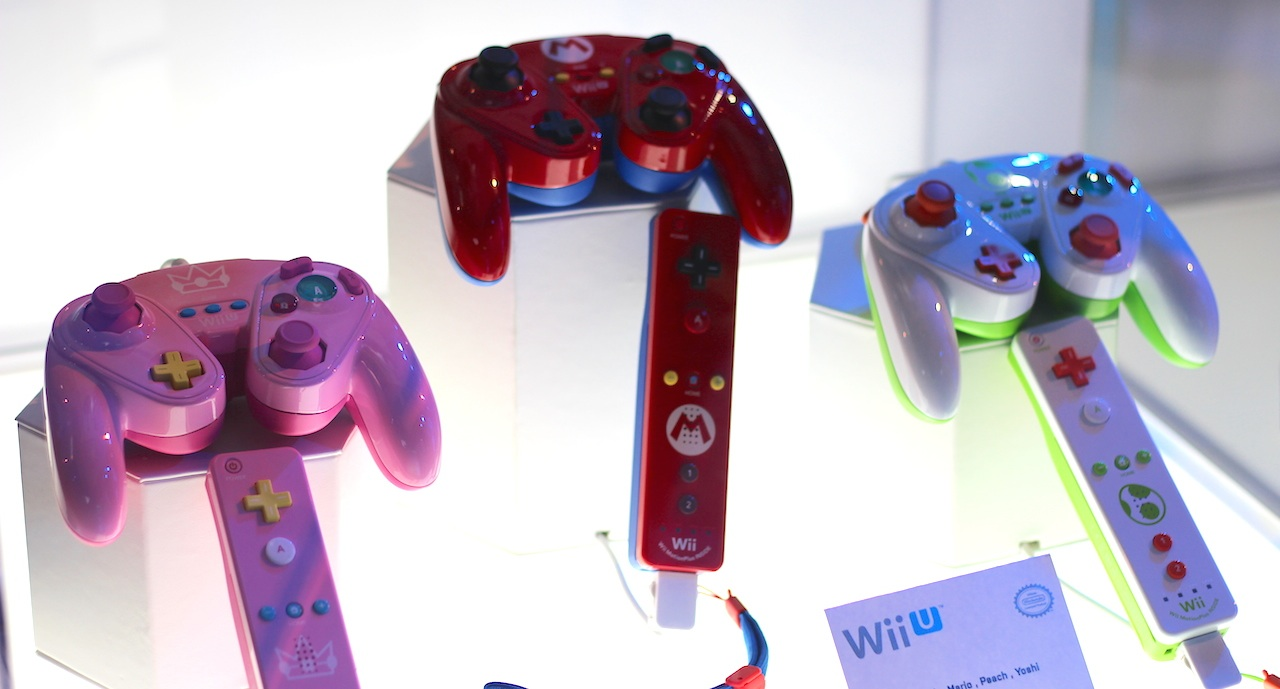
PDP's "Wired Fight Pad" series for the Wii and Wii U, which mimics the design and layout of the GameCube controller

Accessory maker Performance Designed Products (PDP) began releasing a line of officially licensed "Wired Fight Pad" controllers for the Wii and Wii U in 2014, with color schemes based on various Nintendo characters. They are based on the design and layout of the GameCube controller, but are connected via the Wii Remote's expansion port and act identically to a Classic Controller Pro (thus supporting any Wii and Wii U game that supports the Classic Controller Pro, but not GameCube games). To provide parity with the Classic Controller Pro, these controllers feature dual shoulder buttons, as well as the "+", "−", and "Home" buttons standard on Wii controllers. The smaller C-stick is also replaced with a more standard analog stick. Hori released a similar product line known as the "Battle Pad". Unlike PDP, Hori's controllers look identical to real GameCube controllers while also including the same features of the PDP controllers. Both the PDP "Wired Fight Pad" and the Hori "Battle Pad" will work on the NES Classic and the SNES Classic.

In anticipation of Super Smash Bros. Ultimate, both Hori and PDP unveiled similar replications as USB gamepads for Nintendo Switch, both officially licensed. As with their Wii U counterparts, they maintain similar designs and appearance to the standard GameCube controllers, but updated to include dual shoulder buttons and Switch system buttons.

PowerA released a Nintendo Switch Pro Controller with the GameCube controller layout but with additional inputs standard on Switch controllers, allowing it to be used in all Switch games. This controller was officially licensed by Nintendo and is available wireless and wired.

=== Nintendo Switch 2 version ===
A wireless version of the controller for the Nintendo Switch 2 launched simultaneously with the console on June 5, 2025. It is designed for use with the Nintendo GameCube - Nintendo Classics app for Nintendo Switch Online subscribers. It is also compatible with Nintendo Switch games running via backwards compatibility that supported the original GameCube controller via the USB adapter. The Switch 2 GameCube controller features additional buttons to allow players access to the ZL, home and capture buttons that correspond with Switch functionality that was not available on GameCube; along with the console's new "C" button which launches GameChat to communicate with other players. The controller is only available in the indigo color and does not work on the Nintendo Switch, the GameCube, or the Wii.

== Legal issues ==
Anascape Ltd, a Texas-based firm, filed a lawsuit against Nintendo for patent infringements regarding many of Nintendo's controllers. A July 2008 verdict found that a ban would be issued preventing Nintendo from selling the regular GameCube and WaveBird controllers in the United States. Nintendo was free to continue selling the controllers pending an appeal to the United States Court of Appeals for the Federal Circuit. On April 13, 2010, Nintendo successfully appealed and the previous court decision was reversed.

== See also ==
- List of Nintendo controllers
