= Nintendo 64 controller =

Video game controller

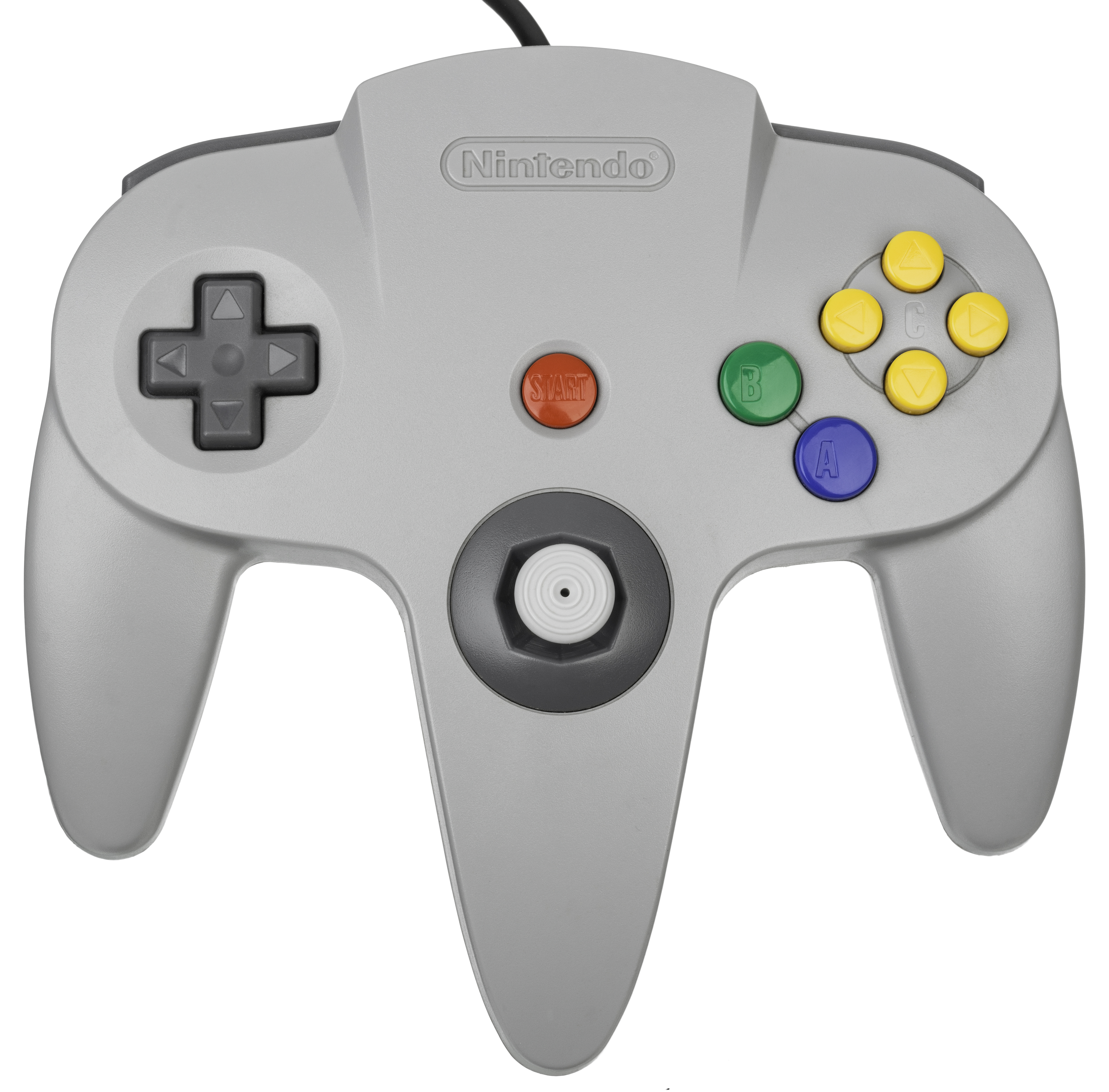
- A Nintendo 64 controller in gray
- Also known as: NUS-005
- Developer: Nintendo R&D3
- Manufacturer: Nintendo
- Type: Gamepad
- Generation: Fifth
- Released: Nintendo 64 (original release): JP: June 23, 1996; NA: September 29, 1996; EU/AU: March 1, 1997; CHL/BR: December 10, 1997; Nintendo Switch re-release and redesign: WW: October 25, 2021
- Input: Control stick; D-pad; 10 × buttons (A, B, C up, C down, C left, C right, L, R, Z, Start)
- Connectivity: Nintendo 64 controller port; Expansion port accessories: Controller Pak; Rumble Pak; Transfer Pak
- Predecessor: Super Nintendo Entertainment System controller
- Successor: GameCube controller

The Nintendo 64 controller (model number: NUS-005) is the standard game controller for the Nintendo 64 home console. Manufactured and released by Nintendo, it debuted alongside the console in Japan on June 23, 1996, followed by North America on September 29, 1996, and Europe and Australia on March 1, 1997. As the successor to the Super Nintendo controller, it features an "M"-shaped design, ten buttons, a "control stick", (Note: Though functionally similar to an analog stick, the "control stick" is digital. It operates like a ball mouse, turning a chopper wheel which is tracked by shining a light through to a photodiode. Its precision makes it effectively equivalent to a true analog stick.) a D-pad, and a rear port for connecting accessories.

== Design ==
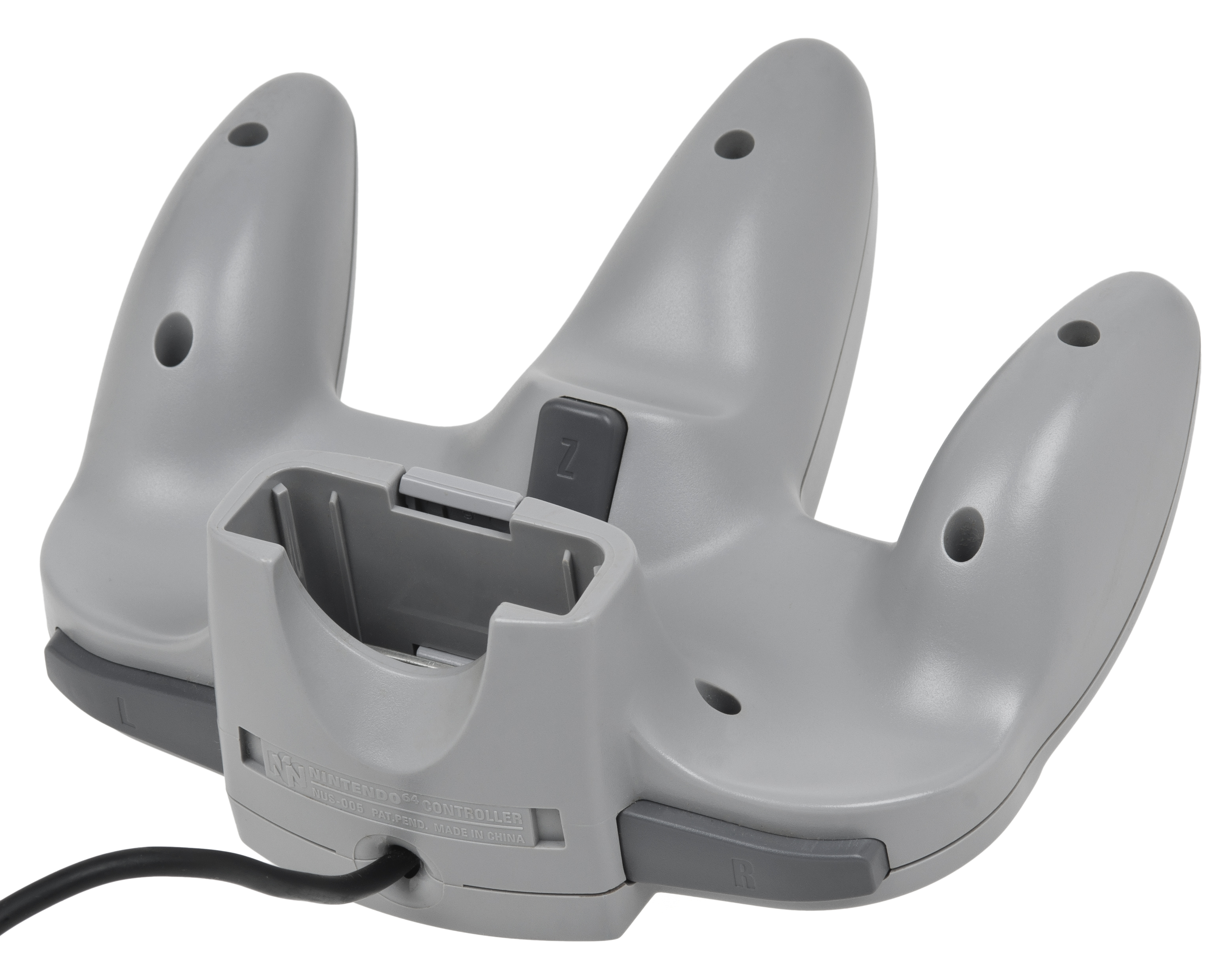
Rear of the Nintendo 64 controller, showing the Z trigger, shoulder buttons and expansion port

The controller was designed by Nintendo R&D3, under direction to try new ideas that would break from typical game controllers. With original visual designs having been mocked up in clay form, and extensive test group studies being performed before and during the design phase, the Nintendo 64's controller design was eventually solidified in tandem with that of Shigeru Miyamoto's gameplay mechanics in Super Mario 64. Though Miyamoto tested the controller while developing Super Mario 64, the controller was not designed around the game, while it did influence its mechanics like movement.

Lance Barr, the head designer at Nintendo of America, worked with the Nintendo 64 design team in Japan on the controller. The sculpted shape of the radical new Batarang-like controller was so complex that it couldn't even be modeled on a computer. During development, the first mock-up was created out of clay.

— Nintendo Power, December 1995

Nintendo of America's head designer, Lance Barr, said that the design studies revealed that "most games use a few buttons for most of the main controls, such as jumping and shooting, or accelerating and braking. That's why the A and B Buttons are placed for easiest access on the new controller and why they are larger than the other buttons. They're the buttons that get high traffic."

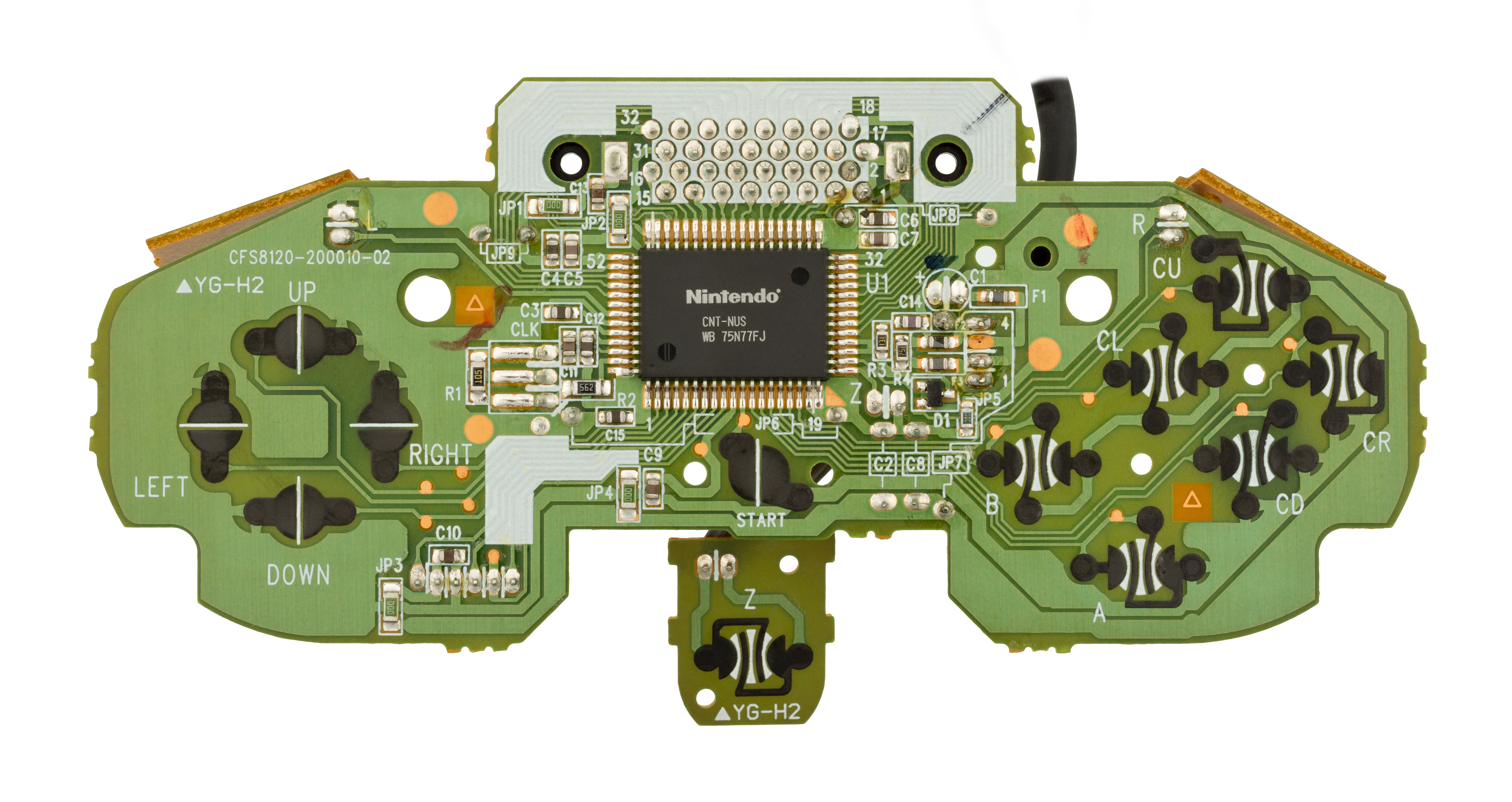
The motherboard for the Nintendo 64 controller

The controller has four "C-buttons" on the top, which were originally intended to control the camera in three-dimensional game environments. Because the pad only contains three other face buttons, the C-buttons may be assigned to alternate functions. In The Legend of Zelda: Ocarina of Time, three of the C-buttons can be assigned to secondary items, the upper C-button is used to call Navi for assistance, and the Z-trigger is used to lock focus onto enemies and center the camera behind the player.

=== Control stick ===
The Nintendo 64 controller was among the first to feature a "control stick" as a central component, intended to provide the user with a wider range of functions such as mobility and camera control. Unlike a D-pad, which detect only 8 directions, this stick could register 360 degrees of movement, allowing for more precise control in games.

While joysticks had long been used in gaming—appearing in the Atari 5200, Sega's arcade systems and Mission Stick for the Saturn (1995), and Sony's PlayStation Analog Joystick (1996)—the Nintendo 64 distinguished itself by using a thumb-operated stick. Previously, the only console accessory to feature a thumbstick was the Mega Drive's XE-1 AP, a third-party device released by Dempa in 1989. The Nintendo 64 controller was released contemporaneously with Sega's 3D Pad for their Saturn system, and was followed during the fifth generation of video game consoles by Sony's Dual Analog and DualShock controllers for the PlayStation.

Though functionally similar to an analog stick, the "control stick" is digital. It operates like a ball mouse, turning a chopper wheel that interrupts a light beam detected by a photodiode. Its precision makes it effectively equivalent to a true analog stick. Since it registers only relative movement, the system assumes the stick is centered at startup. If misaligned, recalibration can be performed by pressing the L and R shoulder buttons along with the Start button or by restarting the console with the stick properly centered.

=== Hand positioning ===
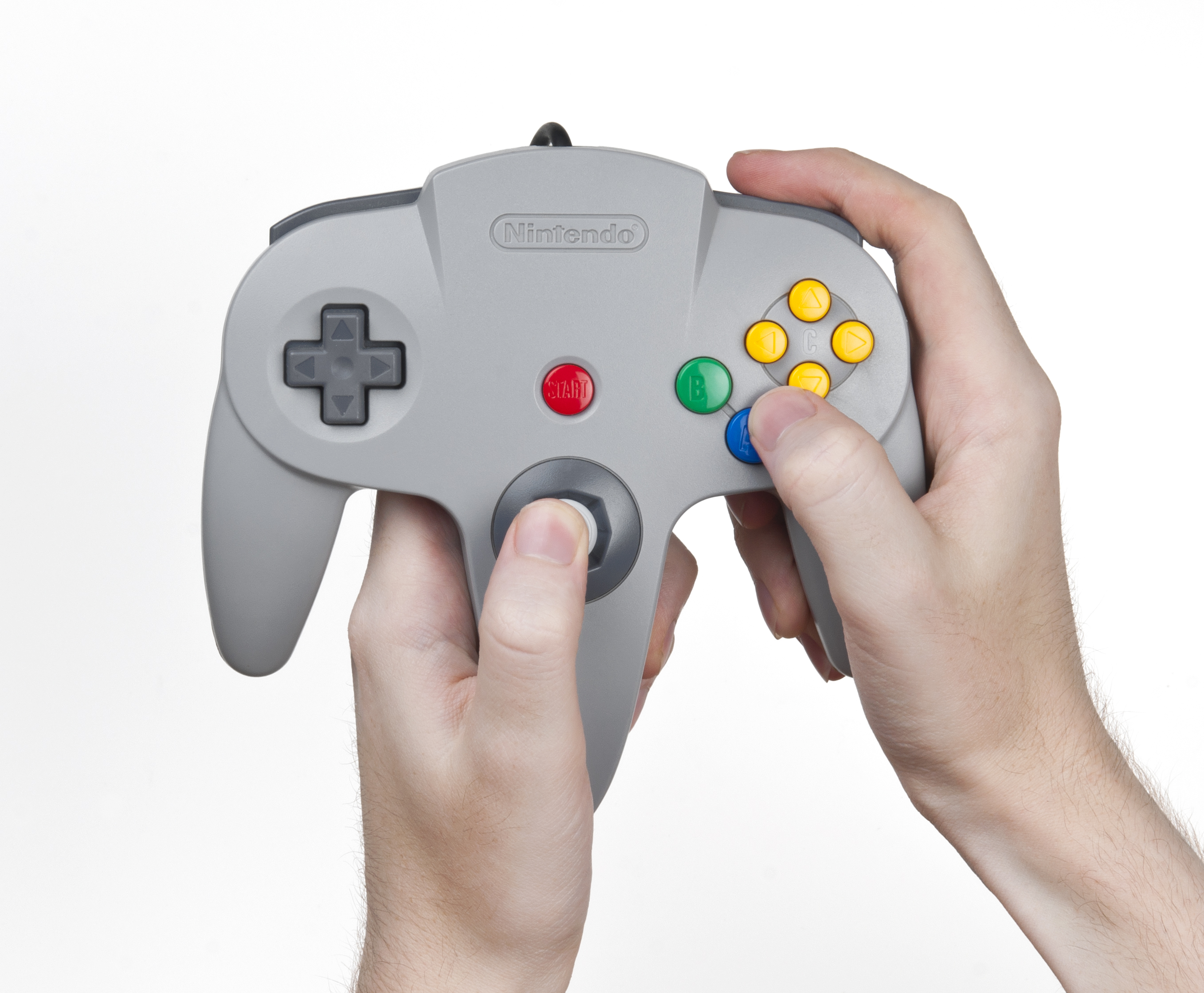
One of several ways listed by Nintendo for the player to hold the controller

The controller was designed to be held in three different positions. First, it can be held by the two outer grips, allowing use of the D-pad, right-hand face buttons and the L and R shoulder buttons (but not the Z-trigger or analog stick). This style was intended to optimize play in 2D games by emulating the setup on the Super NES controller. It can be also held by the center and right-hand grip, allowing the use of the single control stick, the right hand buttons, the "R" shoulder button, and the Z-trigger on the rear (but not the L shoulder button or D-pad). This style was intended for 3D games. Finally, the controller can be held by the center and left-hand grip, allowing for a combination of the D-pad, L shoulder, analog stick, and Z-trigger, as was implemented as an alternative control option in GoldenEye 007 and most of the console's other first-person shooters.

In some games such as Mortal Kombat Trilogy, the control stick and directional pad are interchangeable. Very few games use the directional pad exclusively, such as Tetrisphere, Mischief Makers and Kirby 64: The Crystal Shards. Additionally, though the controller was not designed with this setup in mind, one controller can be held in each hand with a thumb on each analog stick and index fingers on the Z-trigger. This setup allows dual-analog control on some first-person shooters such as Goldeneye 007 and Perfect Dark. One game, Robotron 64, allows one player to use two controllers to control an avatar. This way, the game plays like its predecessor, Robotron 2084.

This design is controversial, as by its nature it generally prevents the use of all of its features with the player's hands in any one position; the D-pad, L shoulder, analog stick and Z-trigger cannot, generally, all be used at the same time as it typically requires the player to switch hand positions, taking the hands off of the key directional controls. Some, though, realized they can hold the controller with the outer grips and use their index fingers for the R- and L-triggers, middle fingers for the Z-trigger, right thumb for the right-hand buttons, and left thumb for the D-pad and (stretching) analog stick, without changing hand positions.

When Sony released its Dual Analog and DualShock controllers for the competing PlayStation, it retained the original controllers' two-handled ergonomics, placing the analog sticks below and inside the primary D-pad and face buttons, allowing the player to quickly switch from the D-pad and face buttons to the analog sticks without letting go of the controller. Nintendo would largely follow suit with the stock controller for its GameCube console, but swapped the positions of the analog stick and D-pad. Such a layout would become dominant in gamepad design, as by that time the left analog stick had become universally accepted as the primary movement control on 3D games across all consoles.

== Accessories ==
=== Controller Pak ===
The Controller Pak is Nintendo's external memory card, similar to those used on the PlayStation and other CD-ROM consoles. Though the Nintendo 64's cartridges can store battery-backed memory much like its predecessors, in supported games the Controller Pak allows save game data to be stored separately from the cartridge; for instance allowing save data to be used with a different copy of the game, or to store data that will not fit on a cartridge's battery-backed memory (such as Mario Kart 64's ghost data). Whereas other console developers opted to plug the memory card directly into a console, Nintendo opted to have the card be plugged into the controller and thus transported as one unit, envisioning scenarios in which players would want to bring their own controller and memory card to play with other Nintendo 64 owners. In such scenarios having the cartridge port on the controller would allow individual players to each use their own distinct game settings and controller configurations while playing simultaneously on the same system.

=== Rumble Pak ===
The original Rumble Pak, designed for the Nintendo 64 controller, was released in April 1997 to coincide with the release of Star Fox 64 and requires two AAA batteries. It provides haptic feedback during gameplay, intending to make the gaming experience more engaging. It was designed to be inserted into the controller's memory cartridge slot, which prevents the use of the Controller Pak. The insertion of a Controller Pak is prompted at every point of save in case one was not already in place.

=== Transfer Pak ===
The Transfer Pak is a device with a Game Boy Game Pak slot that can be inserted into a Nintendo 64 controller's expansion port. When compatible game cartridges are inserted, it allows for connectivity between Game Boy and Game Boy Color games and supported Nintendo 64 titles. The Transfer Pak was originally bundled with Pocket Monsters Stadium and Pokémon Stadium, and it supported a total of twenty games worldwide, only six of which would be released outside of Japan.

== Variants ==
=== First-party ===
The controller initially came in six colors (grey, black, red, green, yellow and blue) but other colors were released later, many of them coinciding with the release of a similarly colored or designed system. Some of these others include smoke black, watermelon red, jungle green, fire orange, ice blue, grape purple, and special edition colors like gold, atomic purple, extreme green, "Donkey Kong 64" banana bunch yellow, "Pokémon" blue and yellow, and "Millennium 2000" platinum. Players would often take apart Nintendo 64 controllers to mix-and-match the tops and bottoms of the shell, creating bi-color controllers.

=== Third-party ===
Several third-party manufacturers would produce aftermarket Nintendo 64 controllers with similar layouts to the Dual Analog/DualShock, such as the MakoPad and Hori Mini. While the optical encoding disks are mostly digital and provide very accurate relative movements, third-party controllers and joysticks often use cheaper potentiometers instead.

=== LodgeNet variant ===
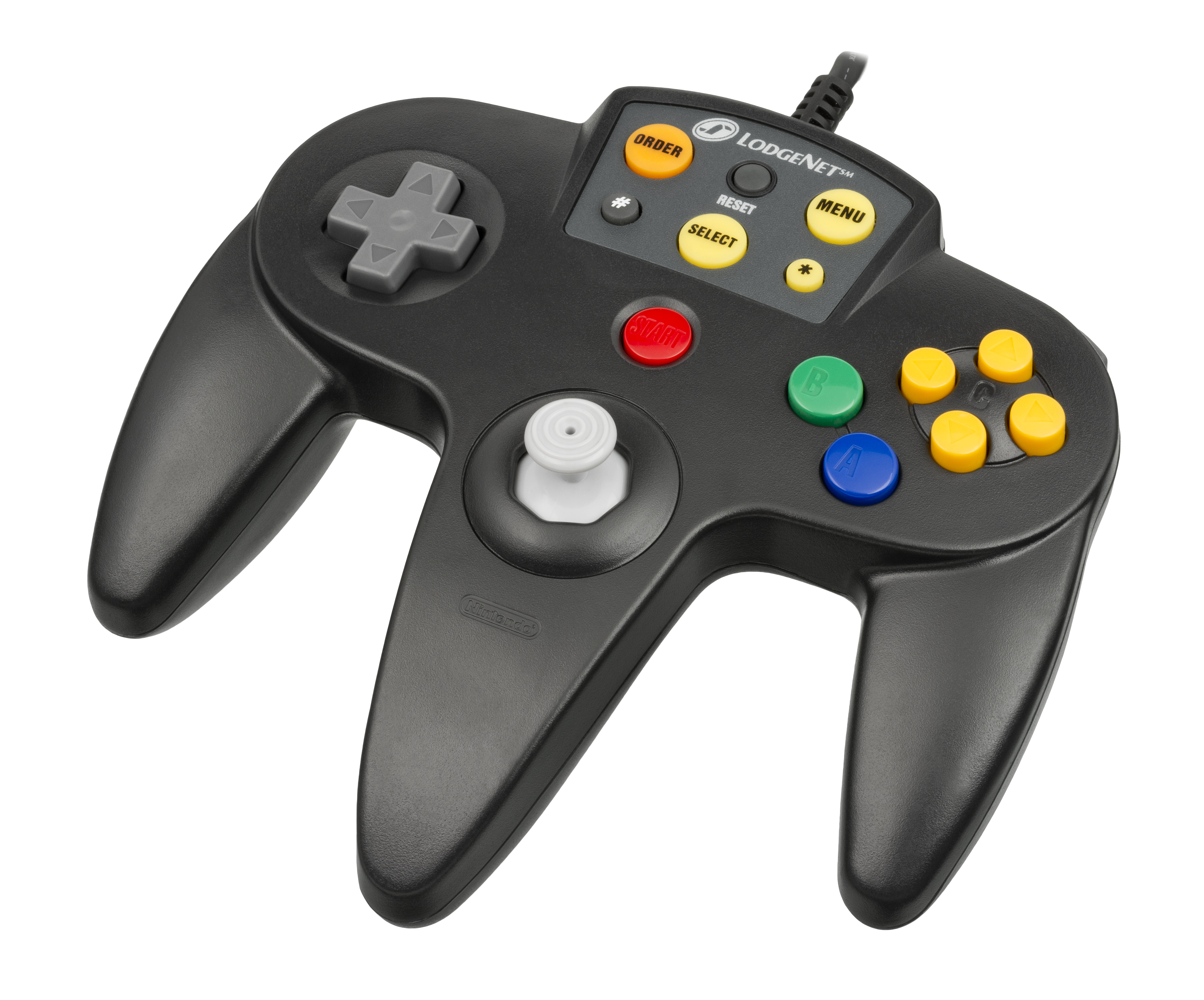
LodgeNet Nintendo 64 controller

In 1999, LodgeNet and Nintendo released a controller and game playing service for various hotels in the United States. It is a slightly modified Nintendo 64 controller featuring an improved GameCube-style analog control stick, and LodgeNet TV control buttons. It attaches to the hotel television and is not compatible with a standard Nintendo 64 console. It functions as a secondary remote control for the television, with up and down on the D-pad able to change channels, and as a controller for available Nintendo 64 games on the LodgeNet service. Customers could choose from a large library of Nintendo 64 games, including most first-party Nintendo 64 games, and play at a rate of $6.95 for every 60 minutes.

=== Nintendo Switch version ===
The replica controller for the Nintendo Switch (shown to the left of the original controller) does not include a functional expansion slot, but the sealed cavity houses a rumble motor to include the functionality of the original Rumble Pak.

Nintendo released a version of the Nintendo 64 controller compatible with its Nintendo Switch console in October 2021. The controller was released in conjunction with an additional tier of the company's Nintendo Switch Online service, called the "Expansion Pack", which gives customers access to a catalog of Nintendo 64 games. The new version makes a series of changes to the design including the addition of wireless functionality and the incorporation of a rumble feature without the need for an additional accessory like the Rumble Pak.

The Switch version also adds additional buttons to allow players access to the home and capture buttons that correspond with Switch functionality that was not available on Nintendo 64.

== Reception ==
Nintendo's own magazine, Nintendo Power, reviewed the controller. The magazine said that it is "a little wider than the Super NES controller, but it felt very comfortable and the control elements were exceptionally well-placed. Large and small hands alike found it easy to manipulate." In their overview of the controller, Electronic Gaming Monthly commented, "All in all, Nintendo has made the most advanced and easy-to-use controller we have ever seen. It is extremely versatile and has enough buttons to take care of every possible contingency, now or in the future." GamePro's overview stated, "The N64's tri-handled controller may look weird, but it feels great." Third party developers were reportedly enthusiastic about the controller as well. Dave Perry called it "the big special move that [Nintendo] have gone for", while Jez San said that "The joystick is unusual looking but I like the controls. The thumb control feels nice and strong and also sensitive."

Stocks of extra Nintendo 64 controllers were sold out on the Japanese launch of the Nintendo 64, despite the fact that all three launch games are single-player only. Similar results followed in North America; retailers reported extremely high sales of the controllers despite only a handful of multiplayer games being available.

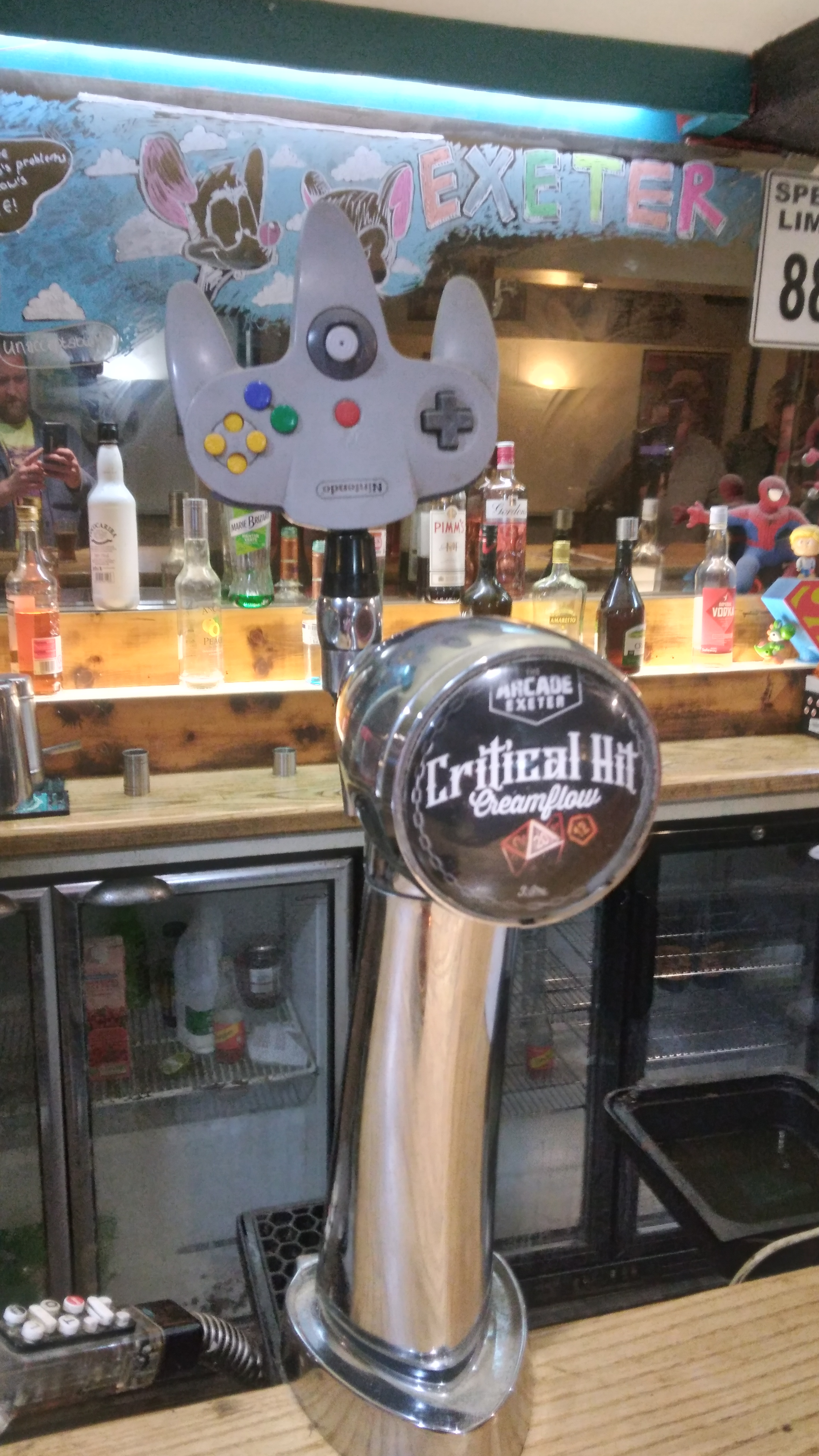
Controller used as the handle of a handpump in a video game-themed bar in Exeter, England

Although its design and usability received praise by most reviewers, the controller did have some mechanical issues that could be detrimental to users. Overuse of the analog stick could cause it to become loose, hampering controllability, and intense rotating of the analog stick reportedly resulted in friction injuries to the hands of some players of 1998's Mario Party. As a result of a settlement with the New York Attorney General, Nintendo offered protective gloves to prevent injuries. In Q1 2000, Nintendo reported that out of more than 1 million copies sold in the year since the game's release, the company had received about 90 complaints, none serious. Tim Weaver, editor of the UK's N64 Magazine, said his staff experienced no problems with the controller, adding that the entire investigation was "ludicrous" and "could only happen in America", although blister injuries were common, especially in Mario Party mini-games such as "Pedal Power" and "Tug o' War". Some aftermarket controllers have since sought to remedy both issues, including rubberised analog sticks with steel construction underneath, often employed by speedrunners and/or retrogaming enthusiasts.

== See also ==
- List of Nintendo controllers
