= WaveBird Wireless Controller =

Radio frequency-based wireless controller for the GameCube

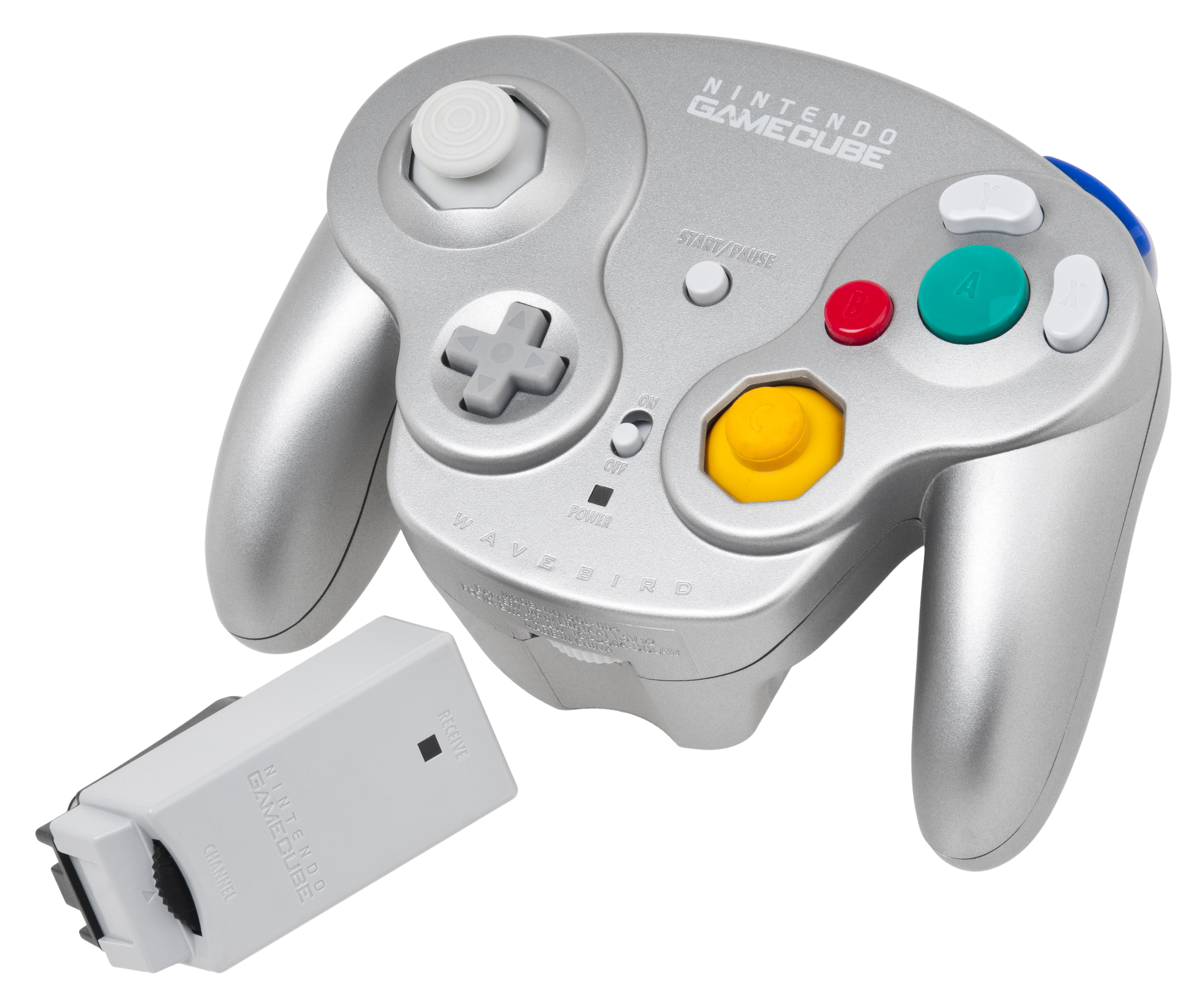
- Platinum WaveBird Wireless Controller and its receiver
- Also known as: DOL-004
- Developer: Nintendo IRD
- Manufacturer: Nintendo
- Type: Gamepad
- Generation: Sixth generation
- Lifespan: 2002–2007
- Units sold: Unknown
- Input: 2 × analog sticks; 2 × hybrid analog triggers/digital buttons; 6 × digital buttons; Digital D-Pad
- Connectivity: 2.4 GHz wireless RF
- Power: 2 × AA batteries
- Dimensions: 2.5 × 5.5 × 4 inches 65 × 140 × 100 mm
- Weight: 7.4 oz/210 g (with batteries) 5.8 oz/164 g (without batteries)

The WaveBird Wireless Controller (model number: DOL-004, stylized as WAVEBIRD, commonly shortened to WaveBird or WaveBird controller) is a radio frequency-based wireless controller manufactured by Nintendo for use with the GameCube video game console. Its name is a reference to Dolphin, the GameCube's codename during development. The WaveBird was available for purchase separately as well as in bundles with either Metroid Prime or Mario Party 4, which were exclusive to Kmart in the US.

== Development ==
Nintendo had attempted to create a reliable wireless controller since the development of the Famicom. Its first attempt was for the Advanced Video System (AVS), the precursor to the Nintendo Entertainment System (NES), which included two wireless controllers but was never released.

Nintendo later developed an infrared (IR) adapter called the NES Satellite for the NES. Released in 1989, it used infrared to extend the length of up to four wired controllers, which would plug into the base of the unit rather than the console. The base could then be positioned anywhere within a certain range of the NES without the need for a cable. However, the extension base still needed a direct line of sight with the NES console; line of sight is a significant limitation of IR technology, requiring a clear space between an IR port and controller.

Radio frequency controllers were not possible in the late 1980s as the early digital RF links were bulky and used too much power to be useful in battery-powered devices. However, advancements in integrated circuits made radio controllers for game consoles commercially viable only a decade later. The WaveBird, released in 2002, solved previous usability problems of wireless controllers by relying on radio frequency communication instead of infrared, allowing the controller to be used anywhere within 6 meters (20 feet) of the console. Although Nintendo only certifies the WaveBird to work within this 6 meters (20 feet) range, tests have proven that they may work as far as 27.5 meters (90 feet) on all 16 different channels. This controller would become the first modern wireless gaming controller, leading to the proliferation of wireless console gaming controllers for subsequent gaming generations, starting with the seventh generation's Wii Remote (Wii), DualShock 3 controller (PlayStation 3) and the Xbox 360 controller (Xbox 360).

== Design ==
The WaveBird Wireless Controller was designed and sold by Nintendo. Unlike most wireless controllers of its era, it relies on RF technology (first used in gaming with Atari's CX-42 joysticks) instead of infrared line-of-sight signal transmission, and the controller's radio transceiver operates at 2.4 GHz. The range of the WaveBird controller is officially 6 meters (20 feet) but some users have reported ranges of 18–21 meters (59–69 ft). The WaveBird includes a small receiver unit which must be plugged into the controller port of the GameCube. Made of the same gray-colored plastic as the standard WaveBird, it features a channel-selection wheel and an LED to indicate when a signal is received. Up to sixteen WaveBird controllers may be used in the same area if each is set to a different channel. In 2025, an open-source implementation of the WaveBird protocol was released, called WavePhoenix. It enables the construction of a replacement receiver.

The WaveBird Wireless Controller maintains the same overall aesthetic design as the standard GameCube controller. The components (analog sticks, buttons, and triggers) and layout remain the same, while adding wireless functionality and space for two standard AA batteries. It is somewhat larger and heavier than a standard GameCube controller, with a channel selector dial, an on/off switch, and an orange LED power indicator on the face of the controller in place of the gap between the D-pad and the C-stick. Functionally, the only feature the WaveBird controller lacks compared to the standard controller is the rumble feature, the motors of which would reduce battery life.

=== Colors ===
The WaveBird Wireless Controller was available in most regions only in light gray and platinum colors. In Japan, two limited edition WaveBird models were released through Club Nintendo: 1,000 Special Edition Gundam "Char's Customized Color" WaveBirds (two-toned red with the Neo-Zeon logo) to coincide with the Japan-only GameCube release of Mobile Suit Gundam: Gundam vs. Z Gundam, and a "Club Nintendo" WaveBird (white top with light blue bottom and Club Nintendo logo).

== Use on subsequent consoles ==
Like all GameCube controllers, the WaveBird Wireless Controller is compatible with the original Wii model (RVL-001), for use with GameCube and Virtual Console titles as well as certain Wii games and WiiWare titles. Since the launch of the Wii, the WaveBird has seen increased popularity due to its ability to control these games wirelessly.

Following speculation that Nintendo might re-release the WaveBird due to the popularity of its use on the Wii, a Nintendo representative confirmed that there were no plans to offer WaveBirds in stores again. Although the representative stated that "original GameCube controllers" would be available directly from Nintendo, there is no listing for the WaveBird.

In November 2014, Nintendo released a GameCube controller adapter for use with the Wii U alongside the release of Super Smash Bros. for Wii U. In 2018, shortly after the announcement of Super Smash Bros. Ultimate for the Nintendo Switch, the company added support for the Wii U GameCube controller adapter for the newer hybrid console.

== Legal issues ==
Anascape Ltd, a Texas-based firm, filed a lawsuit against Nintendo for patent infringements regarding Nintendo's controllers. A July 2008 verdict found that a ban would be issued preventing Nintendo from selling several controllers, including the WaveBird, in the United States. Nintendo was free to continue selling the WaveBird pending an appeal to the U.S. Court of Appeals for the Federal Circuit. On April 13, 2010, Nintendo won the appeal and the previous court decision was reversed.

== See also ==
- GameCube controller
