= DualShock =

Line of gamepads developed by Sony

The DualShock (originally Dual Shock, trademarked as DUALSHOCK or DUAL SHOCK, with the PlayStation 5 version as DualSense) is a line of gamepads developed by Sony Interactive Entertainment for the PlayStation family of video game consoles. It is named for vibration-feedback and analog controls. Introduced in November 1997, it was initially marketed as a secondary peripheral for the first PlayStation console. The console's bundle was updated to include DualShock, and phase out the original PlayStation controller and the Dual Analog Controller. The DualShock is the best-selling gamepad of all time by units sold, excluding bundled controllers.

== DualShock ==
DualShock

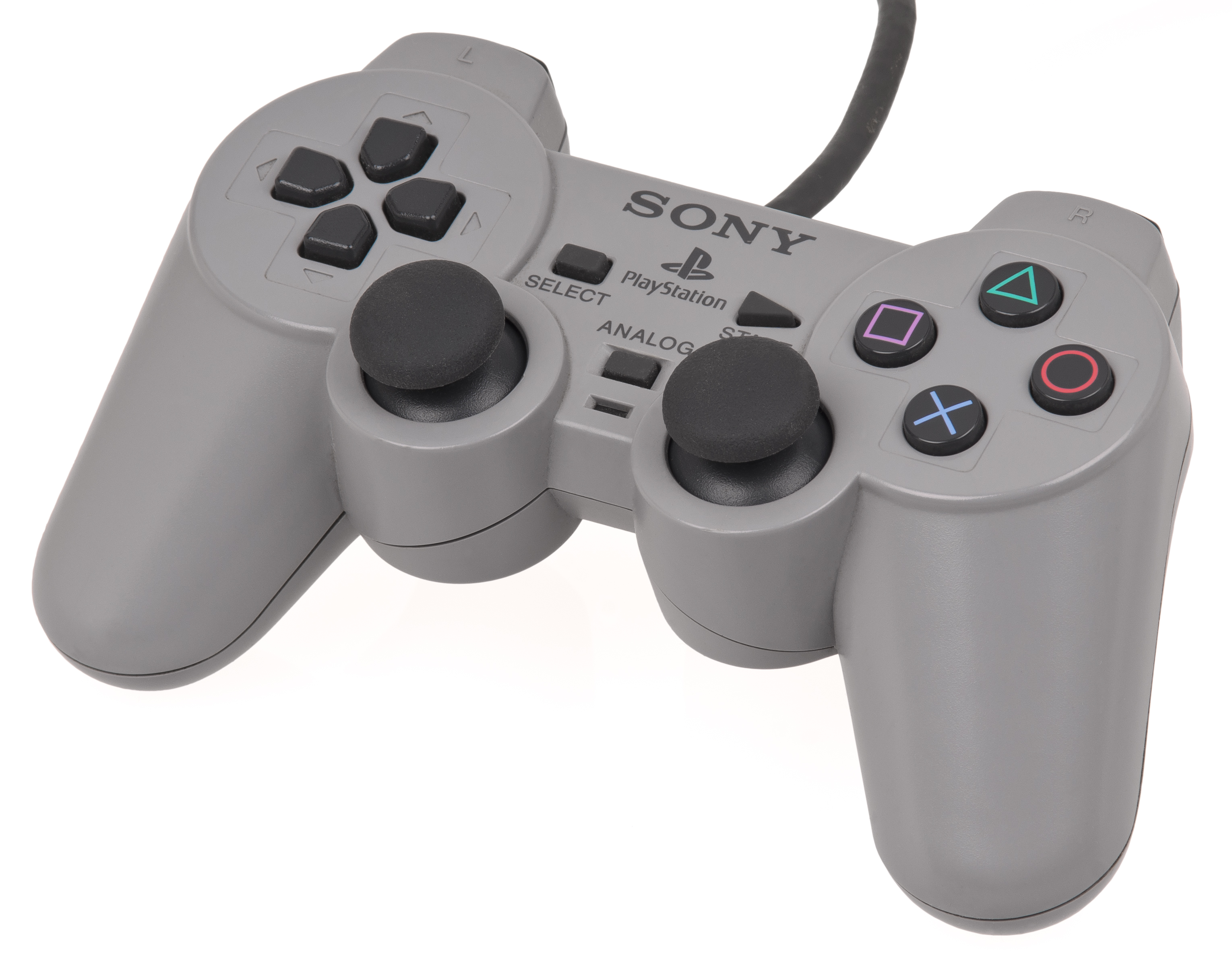
- Original grey version of the DualShock controller
- Developer: Sony Computer Entertainment
- Manufacturer: Sony Corporation
- Type: Gamepad
- Released: JP: November 20, 1997; NA: 1998
- Input: 2 × analog sticks; 13 × digital buttons (L1, R1, L2, R2, L3, R3, Start, Select, Analog); Digital D-pad
- Connectivity: Controller port
- Dimensions: Body: 157 × 95 × 55 mm (6.2 × 3.7 × 2.2 in); Cable: 2 m (6 ft 7 in)
- Predecessor: Dual Analog
- Successor: DualShock 2

Island Blue

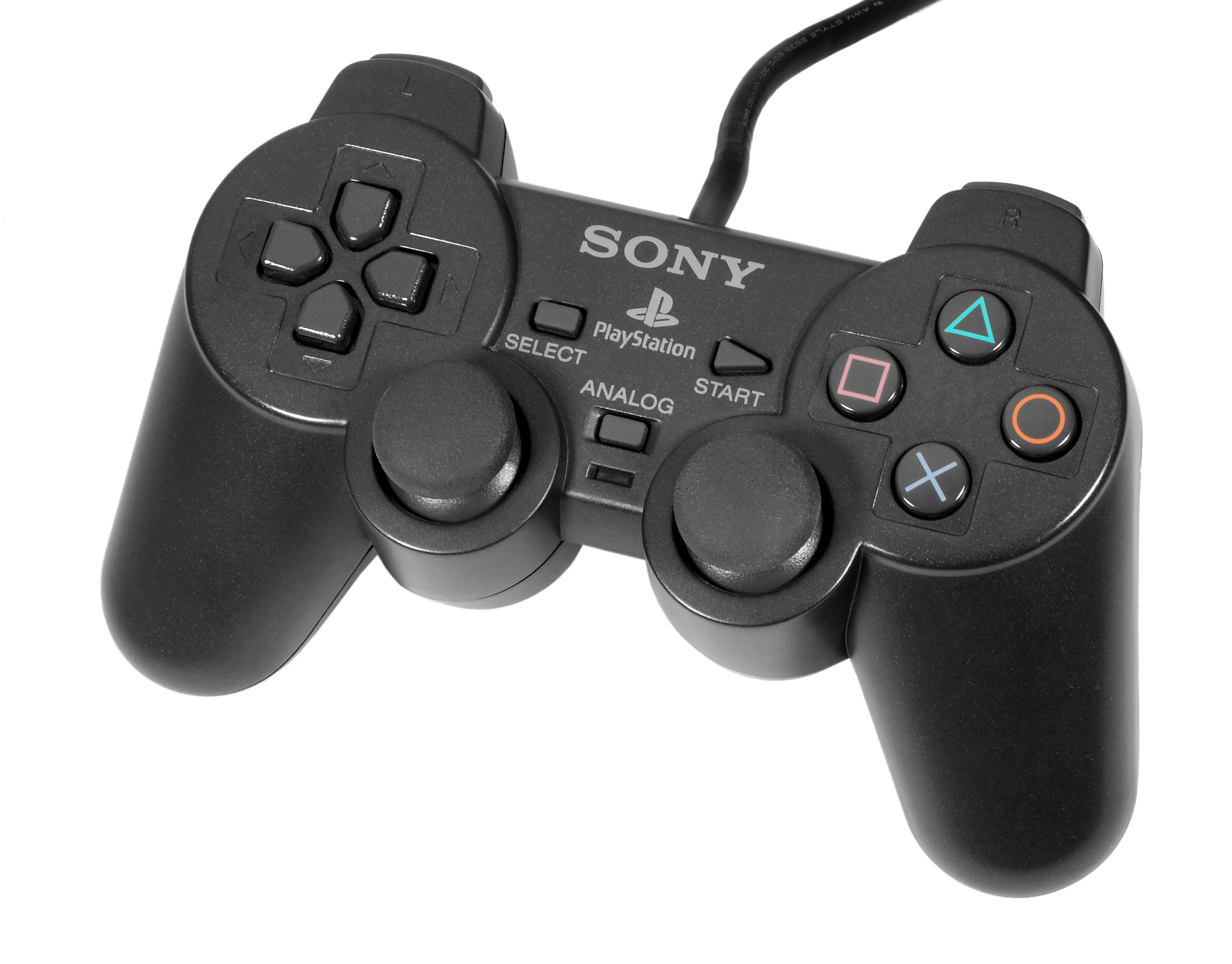
Dark gray

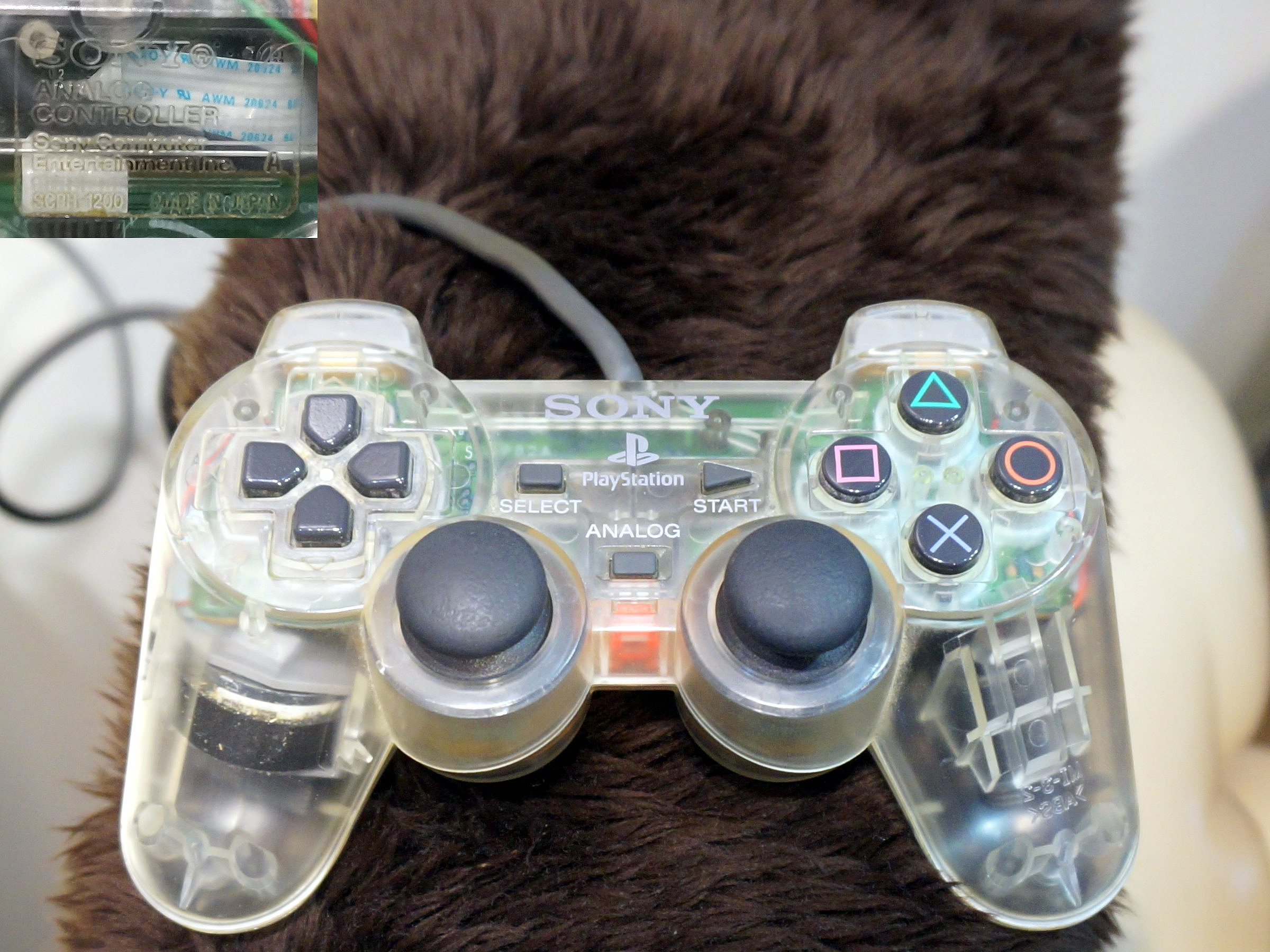
Clear

Introduced in late 1997, the DualShock Analog Controller (SCPH-1200) can provide vibration feedback based on game activity, as well as input through two analog sticks. Its name derives from its dual vibration motors. These motors are housed within the handles, with the left one being larger and more powerful than the one on the right, to allow for varying levels of vibration. In comparison, the Nintendo 64's Rumble Pak has only one motor and is powered by a battery, while the DualShock has two motors and all corded varieties of the DualShock are powered directly by the PlayStation. The rumble feature of the DualShock is similar to that of the Japanese version of the Dual Analog Controller released a few months earlier, which was completely absent on all Dual Analog controllers released outside of Japan.

The Dual Analog, DualShock and all of its subsequent controllers include a standard set of controls that were first introduced in the original PlayStation controller in addition to the two analog sticks: a directional pad, Start and Select buttons, four face buttons, and four shoulder buttons. The face buttons in particular use simple geometric shapes instead of letters or numbers, which include a green triangle, a red circle, a blue cross, and a pink square; these shapes established a trademark that was heavily incorporated into the PlayStation brand.

The DualShock, like its predecessor the Dual Analog controller, has two analog sticks with 8-bit precision. To compensate for control issues with certain games while the controller is in analog mode, a dedicated button known as the "Analog" button is included which allows the controller to function either in analog or digital mode, the latter of which turns off the analog sticks and allows the controller to act as an original PlayStation controller using only the digital buttons. Analog functionality is denoted by a red indicator light, which is turned off if the controller is in digital mode. Unlike the Dual Analog controller, the DualShock's analog sticks feature textured rubber grips with convex domed caps rather than the smooth plastic tips with recessed (concave) grooves found on the Dual Analog controller. Other visible differences between the Dual Analog and the DualShock include the longer grips and handles of the former and slightly larger L2/R2 buttons on the latter. The Dual Analog controller also has an additional mode accessible by pressing the "Analog" button a third time that provides compatibility with the PlayStation Analog Joystick, indicated by a green light on the analog indicator light rather than red; this feature was not carried over to the DualShock. The "Analog" button is also slightly recessed on the DualShock to prevent accidental switching between analog and digital modes in certain games.

The DualShock controller is widely supported; shortly after its launch most new games, including Waku Waku Puyo Puyo Dungeon, Crash Bandicoot: Warped, Spyro the Dragon, and Tekken 3 include support for the vibration feature and dual analog sticks, and Capcom re-released Resident Evil: Director's Cut and Resident Evil 2 with support for the controller added to these newer versions. Some games designed for the Dual Analog's vibration capability, such as Porsche Challenge and Crash Bandicoot 2, also work. Many games take advantage of the presence of two motors to provide vibration effects in stereo including Gran Turismo and the PlayStation port of Quake II. Beginning in 1998, the DualShock became bundled with the console as the standard controller for all regions, replacing the original digital-only controller that was used since its Japan and Western launches in 1994 and 1995 respectively. Released in 1999, the PlayStation hit Ape Escape is the first game to explicitly require Dual Analog/DualShock-type controllers, with its gameplay requiring the use of both analog sticks.

In 2000, the PS one (a redesigned version of the original PlayStation) was released with a slightly redesigned DualShock Controller (SCPH-110). This controller is similar to the first one, except with a "PSone" word mark replacing "PlayStation" underneath the logo, a purple hue on the buttons and sticks to match the color scheme of the PSone, a semicircle-shaped connector, and multiple color options for the body. The standard color of the controller was white, matching the color of the redesigned console.

The PlayStation 2 is backward compatible with the DualShock as it uses the same connector and protocol as the original PlayStation console, due to the console's backward compatibility with original PlayStation peripherals. However, certain PS2 games that utilize the DualShock 2's analog buttons such as The Bouncer are not compatible with the DualShock.

== DualShock 2 ==
DualShock 2

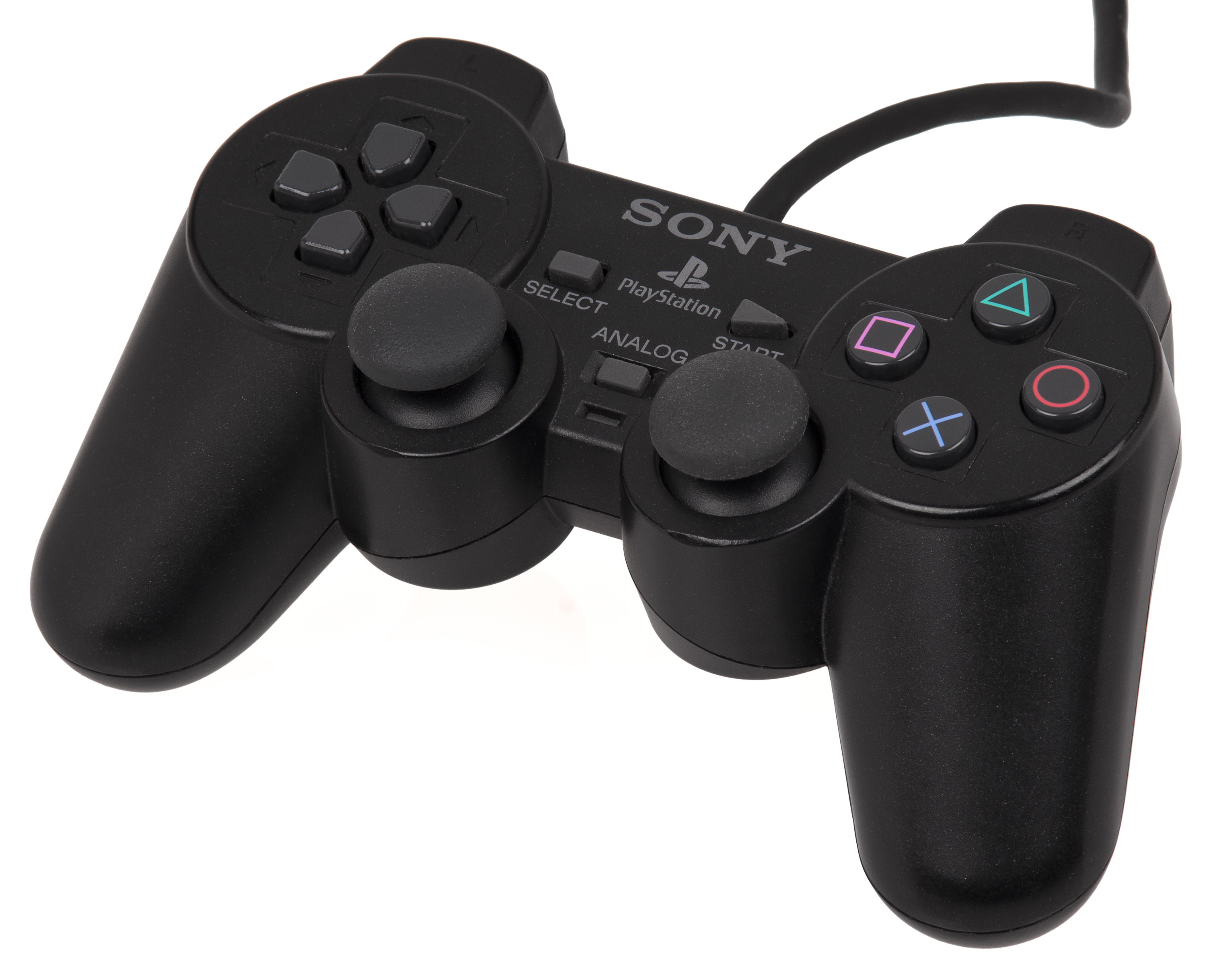
- DualShock 2 controller
- Developer: Sony Computer Entertainment
- Manufacturer: Sony Electronics; Foxconn
- Type: Gamepad
- Generation: Sixth
- Released: JP: March 4, 2000; NA: October 26, 2000; EU: November 24, 2000; AU: November 30, 2000
- Input: 2 × analog sticks (8-bit precision); 2 × analog triggers (L2, R2); 6 × pressure-sensitive buttons (L1, R1); Pressure-sensitive directional buttons; 5 × digital buttons (Start, Select, "Analog", L3, R3)
- Connectivity: PlayStation (2) controller port
- Dimensions: Body: 157 mm × 95 mm × 55 mm; 6.18 in × 3.74 in × 2.16 in; Cable: 2.4 m; 7.87 ft
- Weight: 7.4 oz (0.21 kg)
- Predecessor: DualShock
- Successor: Sixaxis, DualShock 3

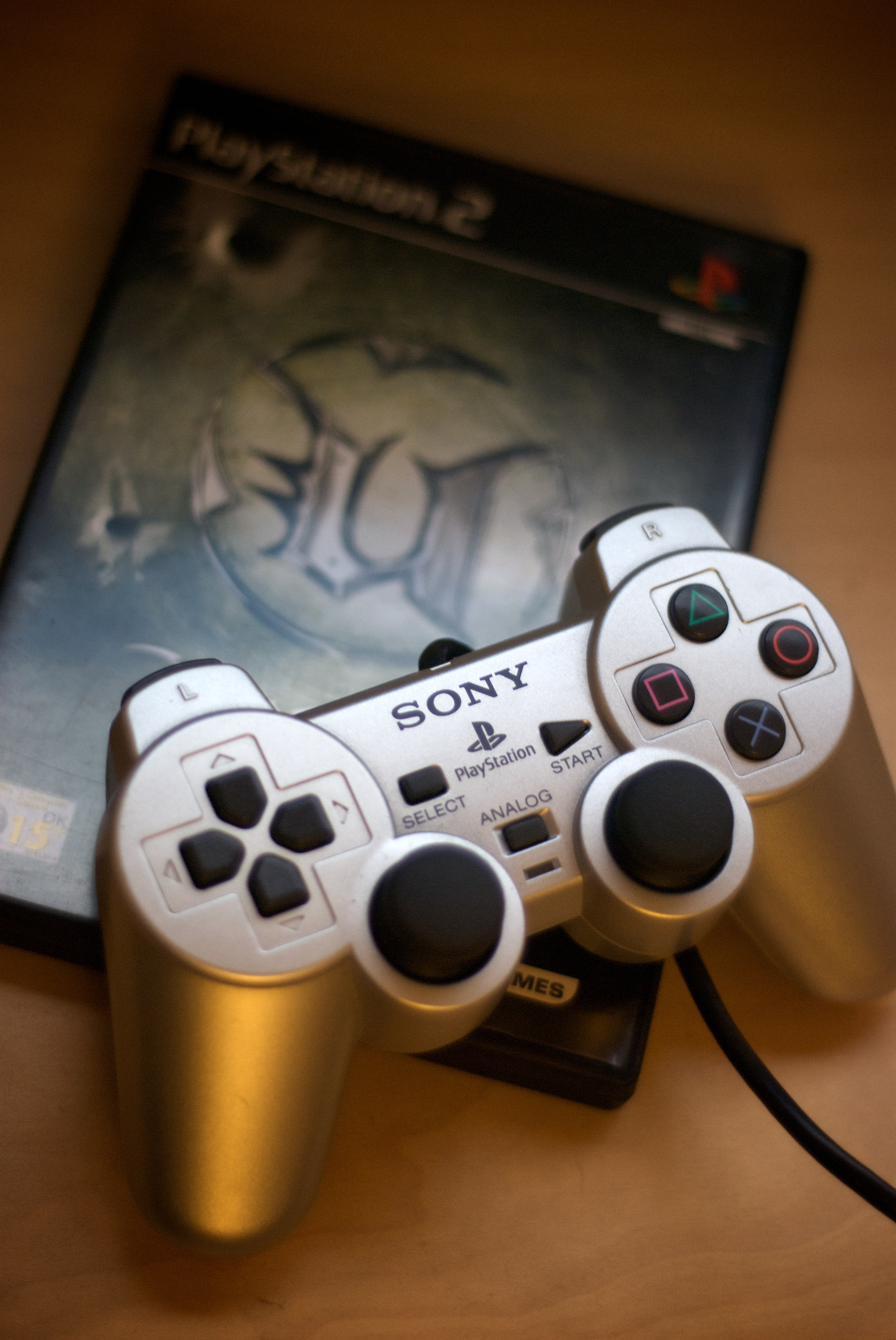
Silver

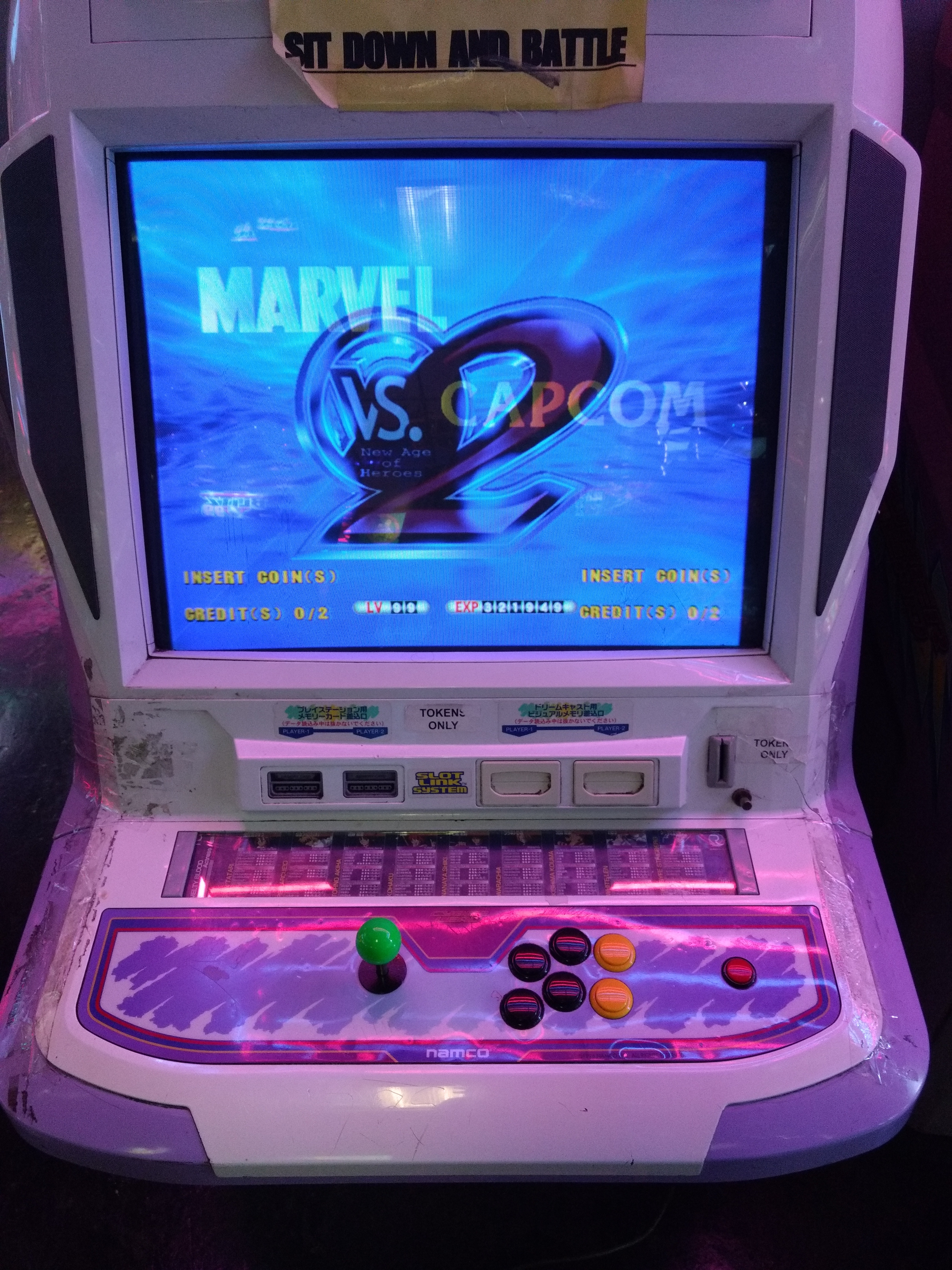
Namco CyberLead 2 arcade cabinet with DualShock (2) inputs and memory card slots

The DualShock 2 Analog Controller (SCPH-10010 or SCPH-97026) included with PlayStation 2's launch is almost identical externally to the previous DualShock analog controller, with a few minor cosmetic changes. It has different screw positioning and one fewer screw. A blue DualShock 2 logo was added to the top of the controller, the connector is shaped more square than the original DualShock, and both the cable and connector are black rather than grey. The standard controller is black (with other color variants being released later on), rather than grey as with the original DualShock. The analog sticks are stiffer than on the original DualShock.

Internally, the DualShock 2 is lighter and all of the buttons (except for the Analog mode, start, select, L3 and R3 buttons) are readable as analog values (pressure-sensitive). The DualShock 2 can sense 256 levels of pressure.

The DualShock 2 has been made available in various colors: Black, satin silver, ceramic white, slate grey, clear, ocean blue, emerald green, crimson red, lemon yellow, and candy pink.

A number of coin-operated arcade cabinets have included controller ports for connecting DualShock or DualShock 2 controllers, including Namco's Tekken 5 and Konami's Winning Eleven Arcade Championship 2012.

The original PlayStation is forward compatible with the DualShock 2. The PlayStation 3 is backward compatible with the DualShock and DualShock 2 by the use of third party peripherals, which connect the controller to the console via a USB port. However, the DualShock and DualShock 2 will not work properly with games that require Sixaxis functionality, such as Heavy Rain.

== DualShock 3 ==
DualShock 3

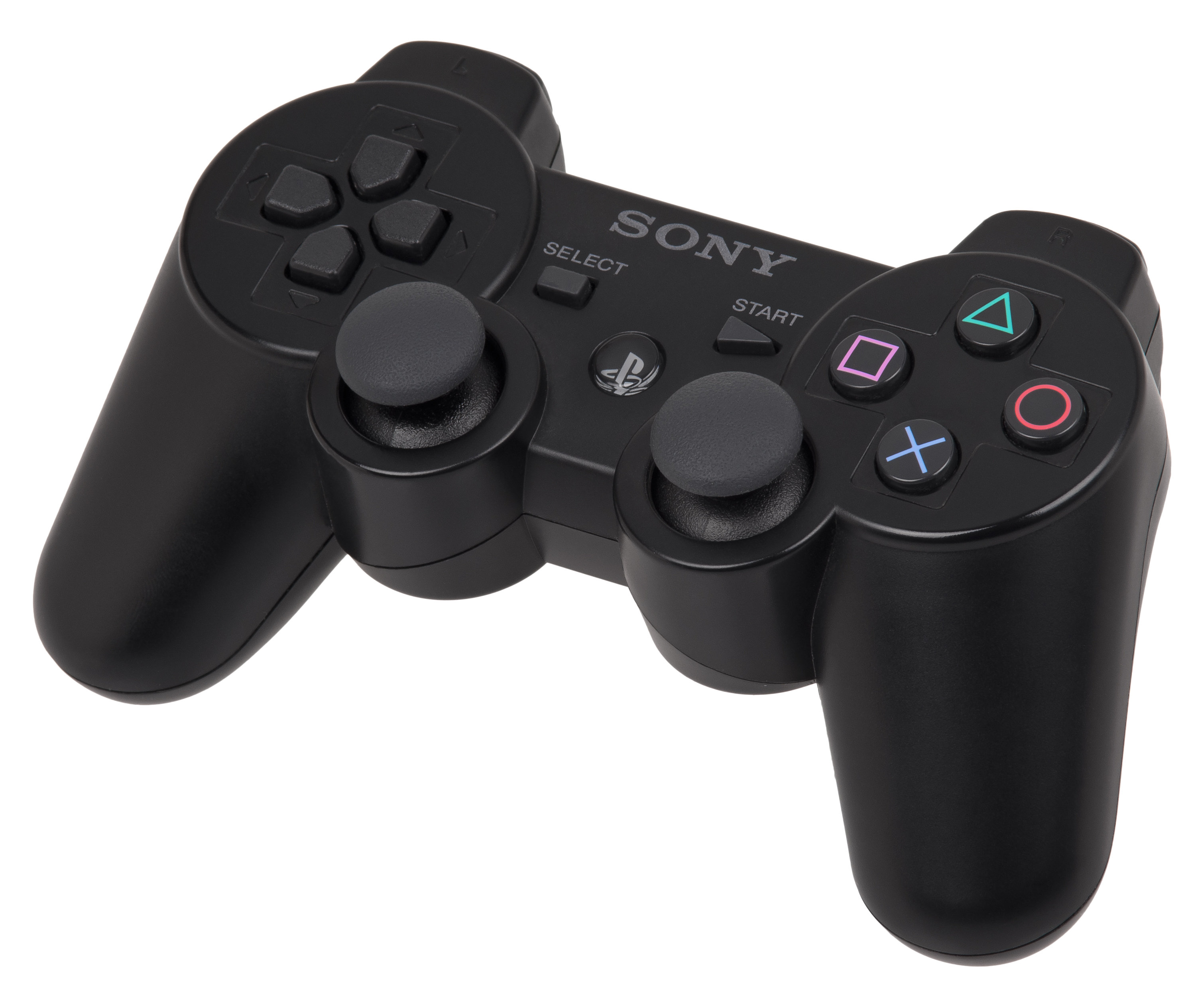
- DualShock 3 controller
- Developer: Sony Computer Entertainment
- Manufacturer: Sony Corporation; Foxconn; Celestica
- Type: Gamepad
- Generation: Seventh
- Released: JP: November 11, 2007; NA: April 15, 2008; AU: April 24, 2008; NZ: May 9, 2008; EU: July 2, 2008; UK: July 4, 2008; IRL: July 4, 2008
- Input: Motion sensing (3 axis, 6 degrees of freedom); 2 × analog sticks (10-bit precision); 2 × analog triggers (L2, R2); 6 × pressure-sensitive buttons (L1, R1); Pressure-sensitive directional buttons; 5 × digital buttons (Start, Select, "PS", L3, R3)
- Connectivity: USB, Bluetooth (PS3 and PSP Go)
- Power: Lithium-ion battery (3.7 V 300 mA or 5.0 V 500 mA), USB host powered
- Dimensions: 160 mm × 97 mm × 55 mm (6.30 in × 3.82 in × 2.17 in)
- Weight: 192 g (6.77 oz)
- Predecessor: Sixaxis, DualShock 2
- Successor: DualShock 4

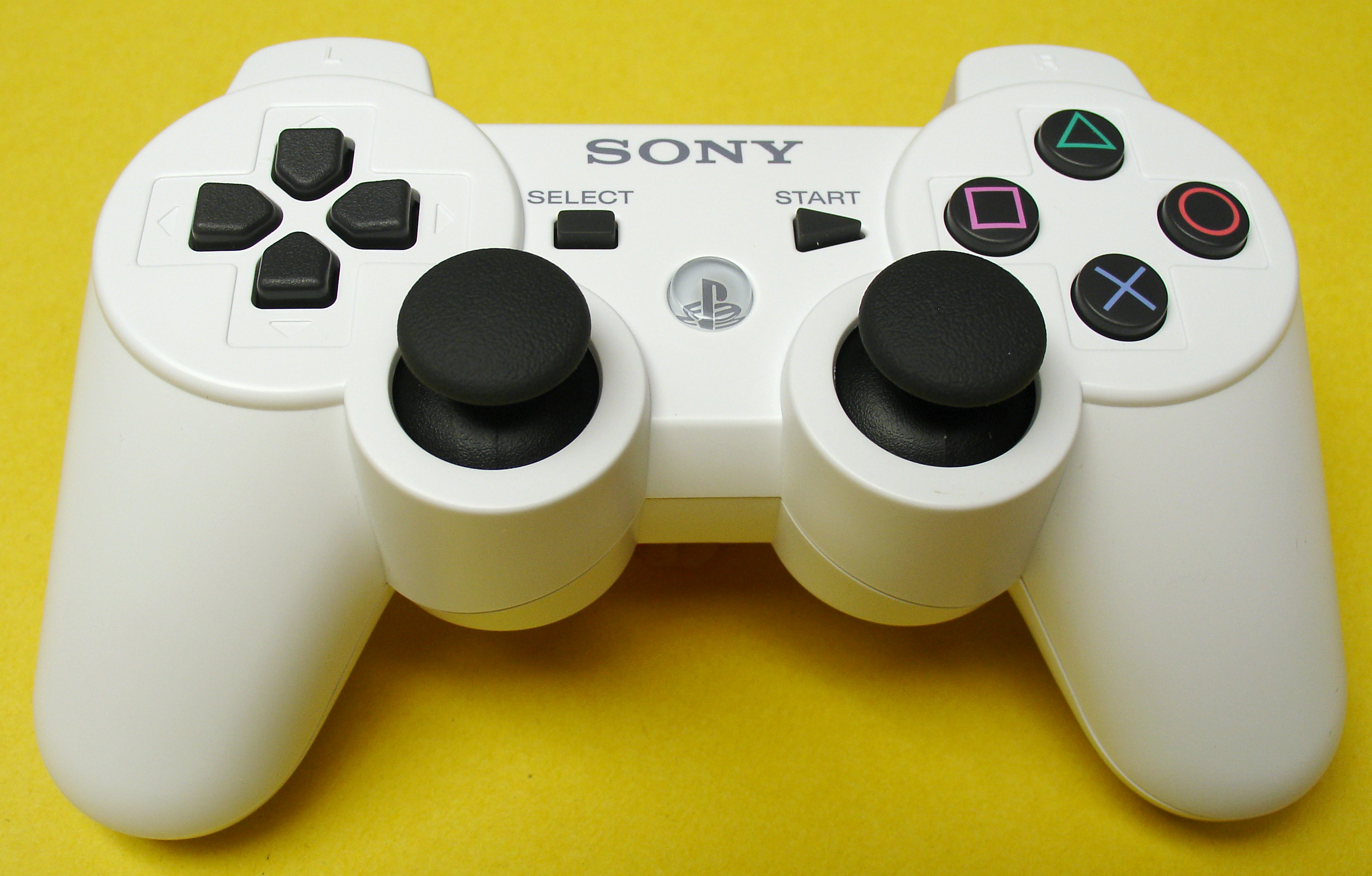
Ceramic white DualShock 3

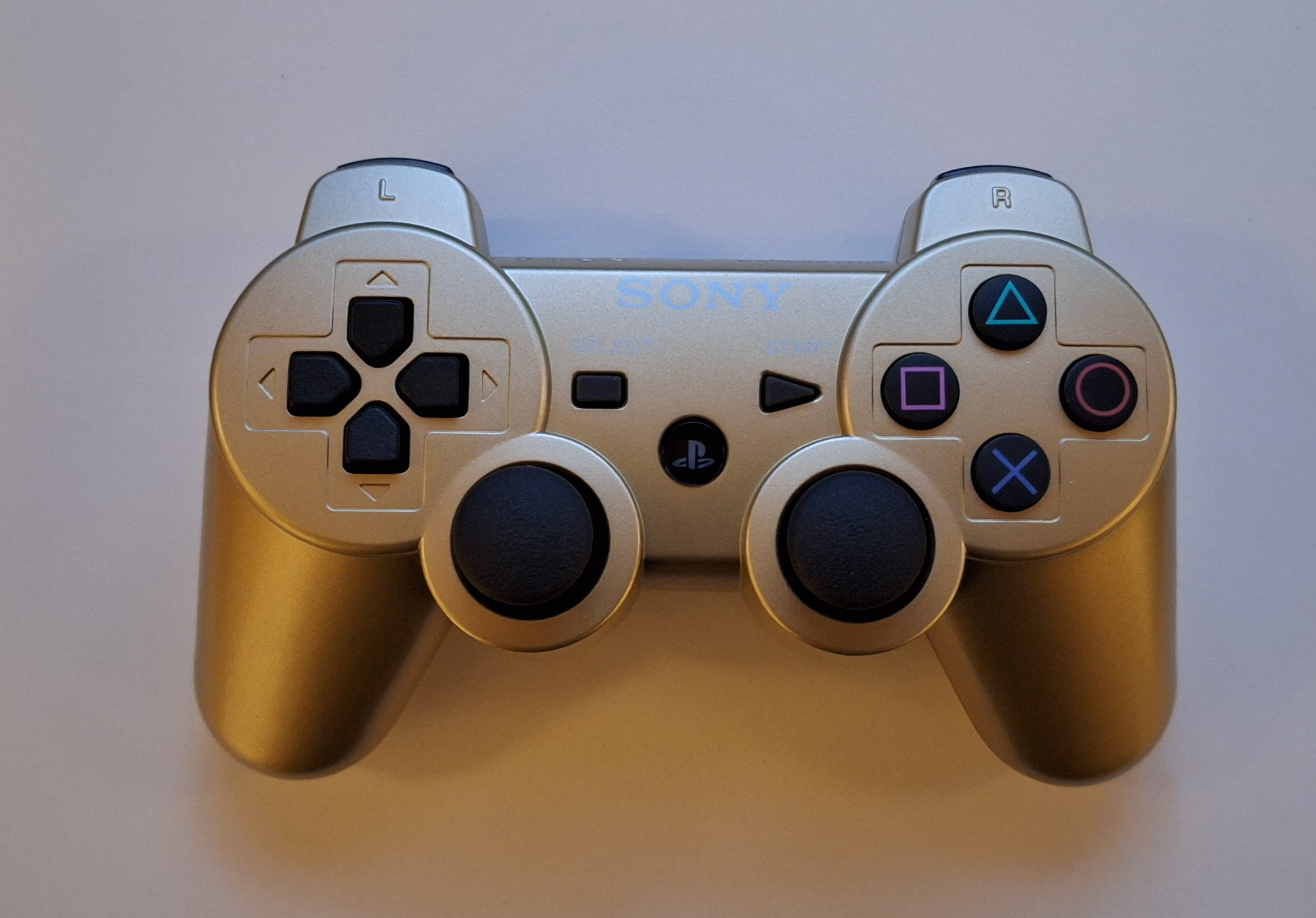
Silver DualShock 3

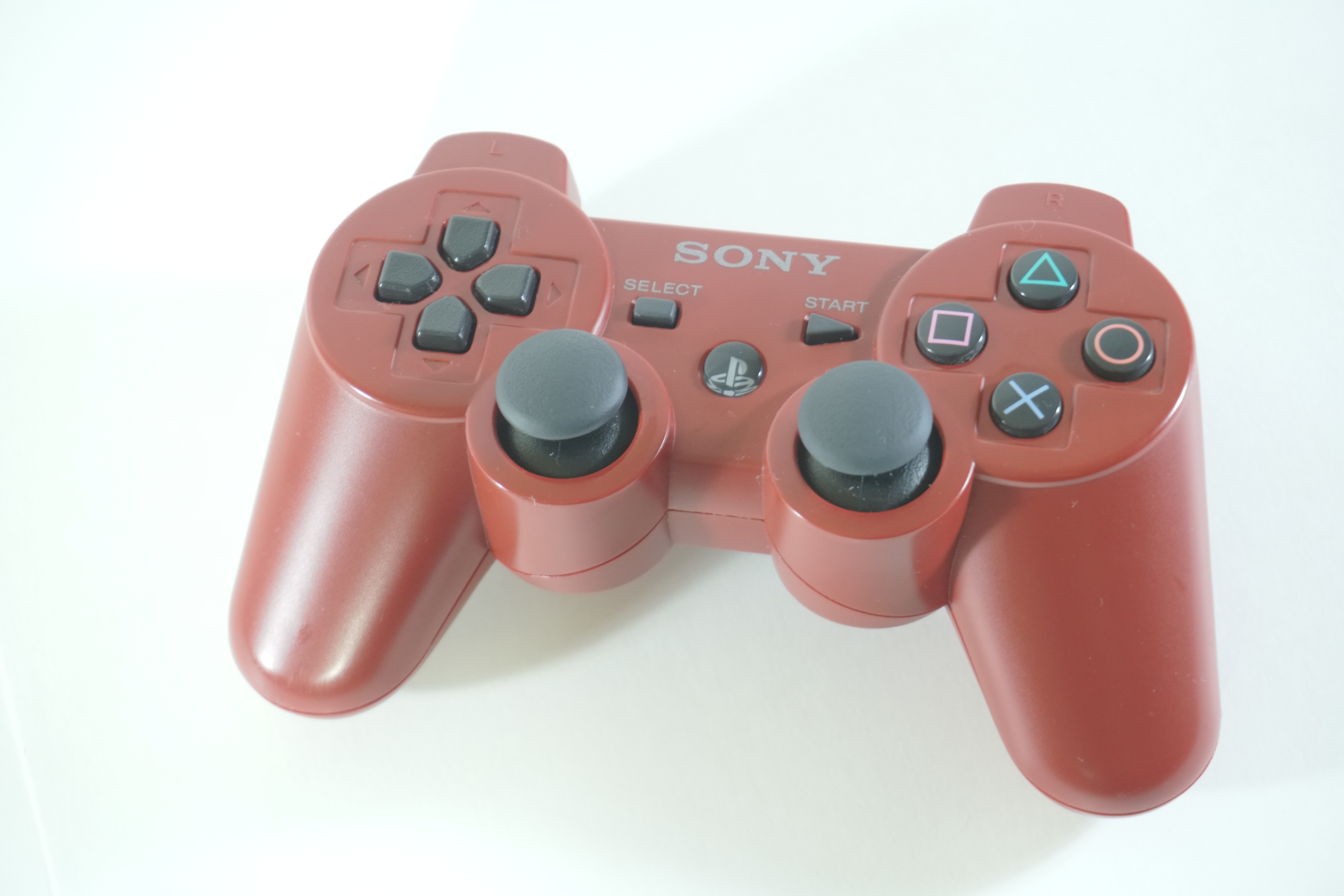
Red DualShock 3

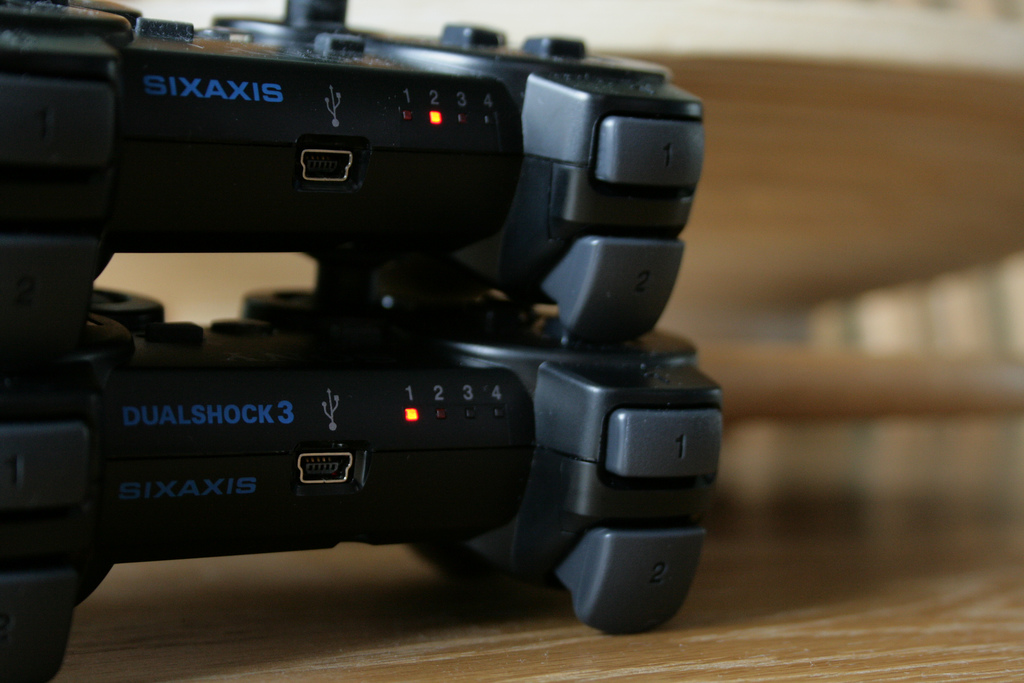
DualShock 3 and Sixaxis

The DualShock 3 wireless controller (SCPH-98050/CECHZC2) is a gamepad for the PlayStation 3, and was announced at the 2007 Tokyo Game Show. It succeeds the Sixaxis wireless controller originally released with earlier versions of the console. The DualShock 3 is nearly identical to the previous Sixaxis version but adds the haptic feedback capabilities found in the DualShock and DualShock 2. Sony settled a patent infringement lawsuit with Immersion in March 2007 following a lengthy legal battle. The settlement cleared the way for incorporating the vibration feature that the Sixaxis lacks. Both the vibration function and motion-sensing capabilities of the DualShock 3 can be used simultaneously without one interfering with the other. Like the Sixaxis, it has a USB mini-B port for charging and can also be used on a PSP Go and the PlayStation TV via Bluetooth, though the controller and the PSP Go or the PlayStation TV must be registered using a PS3 console.

The DualShock 3 can be identified by its "DualShock 3" and "Sixaxis" markings. It also weighs 192 grams (6.8 oz), 40% more than its predecessor, the Sixaxis, which weighed only 137.1 grams (4.84 oz).

The rear markings indicate the original DualShock 3 draws up to 300 mA of current at 3.7 V for a power consumption of 1.11 W, an order of magnitude increase from the 30 mA of current at 3.7 V (0.111 W) listed on the Sixaxis. However, this current is not drawn constantly and is the maximum current when the rumble is active. Its main power source is an internal 3.7 V Li-ion battery tentatively capable of storing 570 mAh, which provides up to 30 hours of continuous gaming on a full charge. Third party replacement batteries are also available. Like the Sixaxis, the DualShock 3 comes with instructions on how to remove and replace the battery. The DualShock 3 can also draw power over a USB cable via a USB mini-B connector on the top of the controller. This allows the controller to be used when the battery is low and is also used for charging the battery. When connected via USB, the controller communicates with the console through the USB cable, rather than Bluetooth.

Along with the release of the 'slim' model PS3, Sony released a new version of the DualShock 3 (A1) which uses 5.0 V at 500 mA while connected, but still contains a 3.7 V battery. This revision of the DualShock 3 does away with the additional plastic brackets between the L1/R1 buttons and the L2/R2 triggers (increasing controller rigidity), has indicator lights soldered directly to the board, and comes in slightly revised color schemes.

While the DualShock 3 is compatible with any standard USB mini-B cable and many USB chargers, official charging cables are available from Sony. These include an official cable, the USB 2.0 Cable Pack and a wall charger, the AC adapter charging kit. Any third-party USB charger used must act as a USB host device, rather than simply providing power over the appropriate pins, since both the Sixaxis and DualShock 3 require a host signal to "wake up" and begin charging.

A Sony representative confirmed on April 2, 2008, that the original Sixaxis controller would officially be discontinued with the release of the haptic-feedback enabled DualShock 3 in mid-April 2008. The Sixaxis was no longer produced after 2008, being dropped from stock by most retailers.

=== Variations ===
The DualShock 3 has been produced in various colors: charcoal black, satin silver, ceramic white, classic white, metallic blue, deep red, pink, "jungle green" (olive), "candy blue" (light blue), "urban camouflage" (three-color digital camouflage), "crimson red" (transparent red), and "cosmic blue" (transparent blue). Not all colors have been made available in all markets or at all times.

Additional colors have been released alongside limited edition consoles, including gun-metal grey and "cloud black" (dark grey).

A limited edition baseball themed DualShock 3 controller was released on March 8, 2011, to coincide with the release of MLB 11: The Show. Another color, "Metallic Gold", became available in June 2012 as a limited edition in Europe, and in North America it was sold exclusively in GameStop in October of 2012. A limited edition God of War: Ascension controller is available in the UK as part of a console bundle to coincide with the launch of the game and in the Americas as a game and controller bundle. On November 1, 2013, Sony announced a new transparent Crystal model of the DualShock 3 controller in Japan.

== DualShock 4 ==
DualShock 4
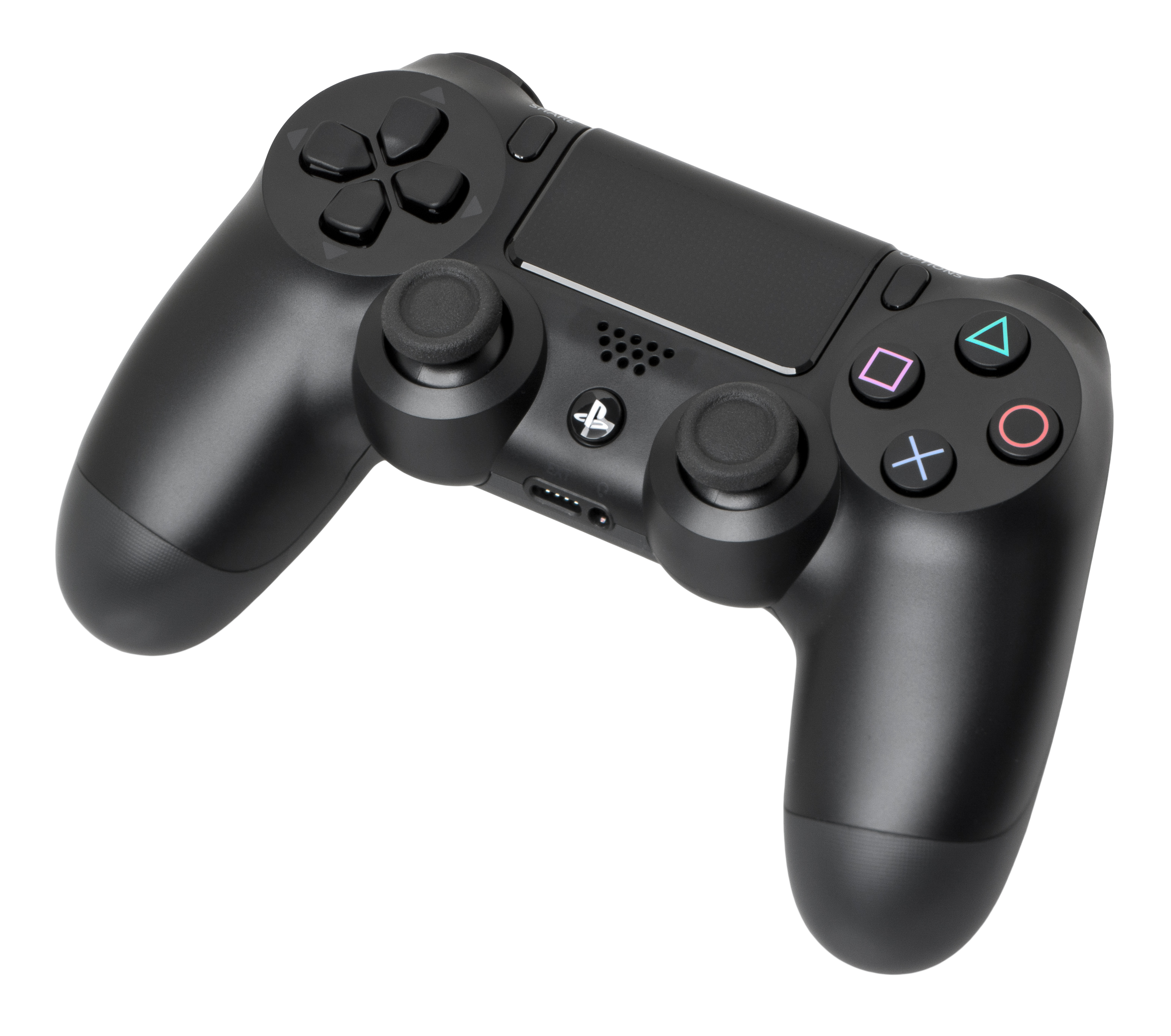
- DualShock 4 controller
- Developer: Sony Computer Entertainment
- Manufacturer: Sony Corporation; Foxconn
- Type: Gamepad
- Generation: Eighth
- Released: NA: November 15, 2013; PAL: November 29, 2013; JP: February 22, 2014
- Input: 6 axis motion sensing (3 axis accelerometer, 3 axis gyroscope); 2 × analog sticks; 2 × analog triggers (L2, R2); 12 × digital buttons (L1, R1, L3, R3, "PS", SHARE, OPTIONS, touchpad click); Digital directional buttons; 2 point capacitive touchpad with click mechanism (see buttons)
- Connectivity: microUSB (Micro-B) 2.0, Bluetooth v2.1+EDR, 3.5 mm TRRS (CTIA) stereo headset jack, extension port
- Power: 3.7 V 1000 mAh Li-ion battery, USB 3.0 host powered
- Dimensions: 162 mm × 52 mm × 98 mm (6.4 in × 2.0 in × 3.9 in)
- Weight: 210 g (7.4 oz)
- Predecessor: DualShock 3
- Successor: DualSense

This diagram of the DualShock 4 controller from the back left shows the light bar (blue) used for player identification, micro USB port, the touch pad, SHARE and OPTIONS buttons, and the other controls.

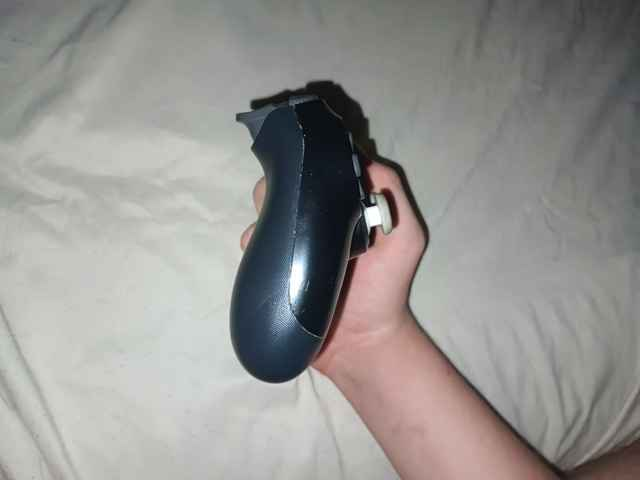
A left-side view of the DualShock 4 controller shows the more rounded, ergonomic design than with previous controllers.

The DualShock 4 (CUH-ZCT1 or CUH-ZCT2) is the PlayStation 4's controller. It has several new features from DualShock 3. One new feature is a built-in two-point capacitive touch pad on the front of the controller, which can be clicked. This allows the touch pad to represent multiple buttons, as demonstrated in the PS4 version of Elite Dangerous in which the four corners of the touch pad can be mapped to a separate clickable actions. The controller supports motion detection via a three-axis gyroscope and three-axis accelerometer and vibration. It includes a rechargeable 3.7 V, 1000 mAh lithium-ion battery, which can be charged while the system is in rest mode. It weighs 210 g (7.4 oz) and has dimensions of 162 mm × 52 mm × 98 mm (6.4 in × 2.0 in × 3.9 in).

The front of the controller features a light bar containing three LEDs that, when lit in conjunction, cause the light bar to glow a variety of colors. Developed for PlayStation VR, it can be used to identify players by matching the colors of the characters they control in a game, or to provide enhanced feedback or immersion by changing patterns or colors in reaction to gameplay. An early example of this is displayed in the game Grand Theft Auto V; the light bar will flash red and blue when the player is wanted by the police, simulating the flashing lights of a police car. The light bar is also used in conjunction with the PlayStation Camera to judge the positions and movements of multiple players.

The controller features several input and output connectors: a stereo headset jack (3.5 mm CTIA TRRS connector), a micro-USB port, and an extension port. It can be charged using the console, using a dedicated charging station, or via microUSB using a standalone charger. It also includes a mono speaker, like the Wii Remote, and is the second major controller in video game history to have such feature.

The DualShock 4 features the following buttons: PS button, SHARE button, OPTIONS button, directional buttons, action buttons (triangle, circle, cross, square), shoulder buttons (L1/R1), triggers (L2/R2), analog stick click buttons (L3/R3), and a touch pad click button. These mark several changes from the DualShock 3 and other previous PlayStation controllers. The START and SELECT buttons have been merged into a single OPTIONS button. A dedicated SHARE button allows players to upload screenshots and videos from their gameplay experiences. The joysticks and triggers have been redesigned based on developer input, with the ridged surface of the joysticks now featuring an outer ring surrounding the convex dome caps. This gave the analog sticks a more concave-like appearance, with a similar yet different appearance being previously seen in the Dual Analog controller that had completely concave plastic analog sticks.

The DualShock 4's buttons differ slightly in functionality from that of the DualShock 3. Only the L2 and R2 triggers have any kind of analog input, as all of its buttons (aside from the analog sticks) were changed back into digital inputs for the first time since the original DualShock, a change from the functionality of the DualShock 2 and 3. This is likely due to the fact that most games did not utilize these buttons as well as due to it not being used on competitors' controllers.

The PlayStation 3 is forward compatible with the DualShock 4 originally via a microUSB cable only, however firmware update 4.60 for the PS3 adds wireless connectivity for the DualShock 4, albeit without the vibration and motion sensing capabilities. As the START and SELECT buttons are no longer present, the OPTIONS and SHARE buttons respectively replace them. The PS button does not work, thus requiring the console to be reset in order to go back to the menu. The PlayStation 5 is backward compatible with the DualShock 4 exclusively for backward compatible PlayStation 4 games.

=== Version issues and modifications ===
Sony's earlier DualShock 4 controllers (CUH-ZCT1 controllers) have wear issues with the rubber surface on both analog sticks which exhibited excessive wear or tearing after short-term use. In January 2014, Sony issued a statement acknowledging an issue on 10% of controllers.

On September 15, 2016, a second version of DualShock 4 controllers was released, the DualShock Version 2 (CUH-ZCT2), which hosts slight improvements over the original DualShock 4, including USB communication, improved triggers and joysticks, a longer battery life and the ability to see the light bar from the top of the touchpad.

In the first generation controller, the light bar is a permanently illuminated, bright-colored light. The needless light pollution and battery drain prompted inquiries as to whether the light bar could be switched off by users. Sony executive Shuhei Yoshida initially responded in the negative in July 2013, though game developers have the option to disable the light in game. In early 2014, the company announced that a future update would allow the light bar to be dimmed, which was delivered in 1.70 in April 2014.

=== Variations ===
==== Tincture ====
The original DualShock 4 (CUH-ZCT1) is available in Jet Black, Glacier White, Urban Camouflage, Wave Blue (black back), Magma Red (black back), Gold, Silver, and Steel Black.

The newer DualShock 4 (CUH-ZCT2) has been produced in Jet Black, Glacier White, Green Camouflage, Blue Camouflage, Red Camouflage, Rose Gold, Electric Purple, Wave Blue (blue back), Magma Red (red back), Gold, Silver, Sunset Orange, Crystal, Red Crystal, Blue Crystal, Steel Black, Midnight Blue, Metallic Copper, Alpine Green, and Berry Blue.

==== Generations ====
Several versions of the DualShock 4 controller were released.

DualShock 4 generation by model number
Model	Version	Generation	Beginning of model no.	End of model no.
CUH-ZCT1	none	1 or 2	4-472-348-...	11F1, 12F1, 31F1, 41F2, 01G, 02G, 03G, 21G
CUH-ZCT1	none	1 or 2	4-539-610-..	71F1
CUH-ZCT1	1	3	4-472-348-...	13F1, 33F1, 42F2, 51F1, 61F2, 04G, 23G
CUH-ZCT1	1	3	4-473-498-...	11F1, 02G, 01G
CUH-ZCT1	1	3	4-573-474-...	11F1, 21F2, 31F1, 01G
CUH-ZCT1	1	3	4-539-610-...	31F1, 32F1, 02G
CUH-ZCT2	2	4 or 5	4-594-645-...	11F1, 21F2, 01G, 31G, 51G, 61F1, 41G, 61G, 02G, 22F2
CUH-ZCT2	2	4 or 5	4-594-662-...	61F1, 22F2, 01G, 02G, 32G, 71F2, 03G
CUH-ZCT2	2	4 or 5	4-698-771-...	42F1, 23F2, 01G, 32G
CUH-ZCT2	2	4 or 5	4-739-192-...	01F1

Exclusive console bundles with DualShock 4 include the 20th Anniversary Edition, Gun Metal, Batman: Arkham Knight, Metal Gear Solid V: The Phantom Pain, Call of Duty: Black Ops III, Uncharted 4: A Thief's End, Star Wars Battlefront, Monster Hunter World, God of War, Gran Turismo Sport, Call of Duty: World War II, The Days of Play, Marvel's Spider-Man, Death Stranding, The Last of Us Part II, and the 500 Million Limited Edition PS4 Pro.

== DualSense ==
DualSense
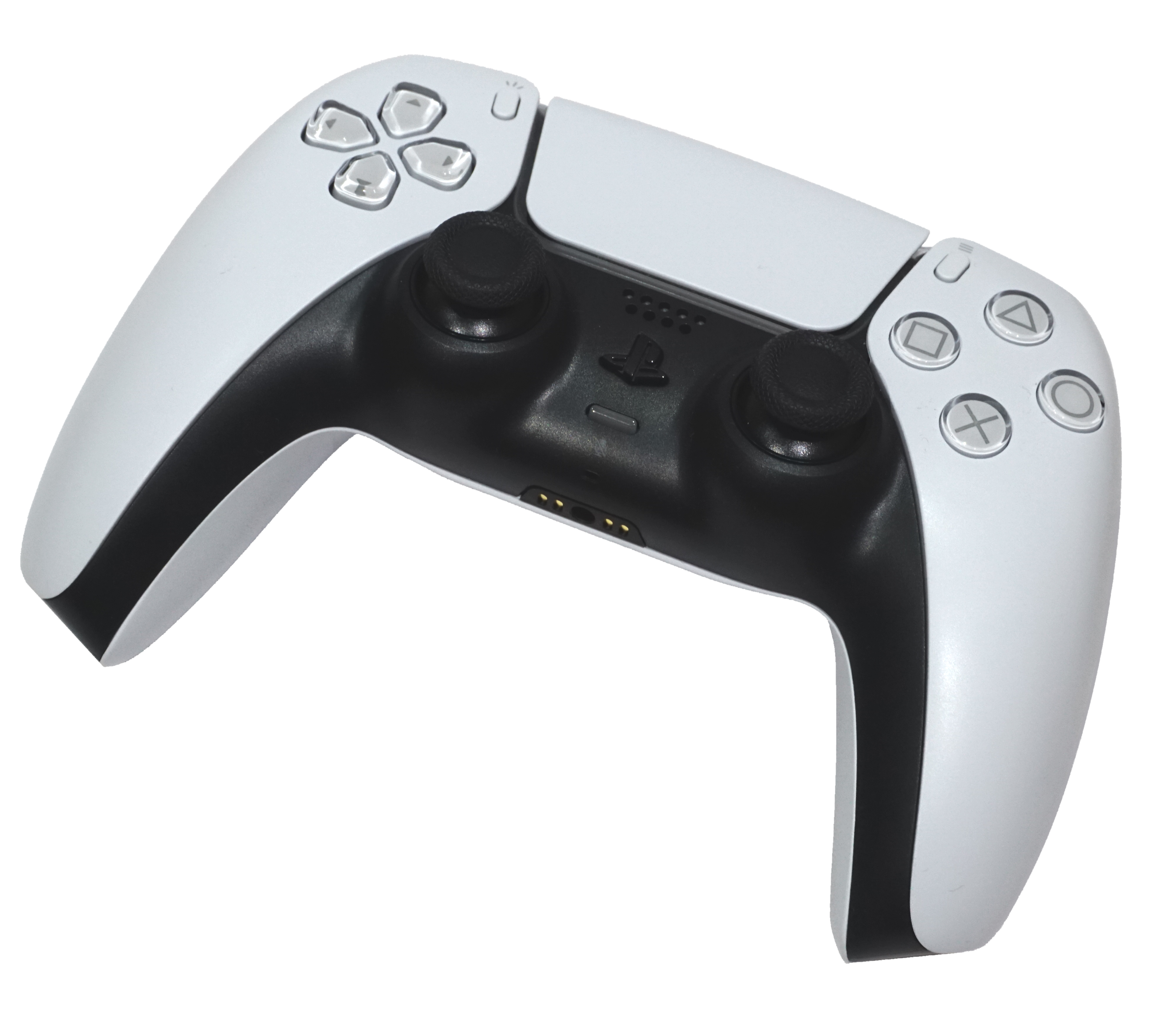
- DualSense controller
- Developer: Sony Interactive Entertainment
- Manufacturer: Sony Corporation; Celestica
- Type: Gamepad
- Generation: Ninth
- Released: AU/JP/KR/NA/NZ: November 12, 2020; WW: November 19, 2020; INA: January 22, 2021; IND: February 2, 2021; CHN: May 15, 2021
- Input: 6 axis motion sensing (3 axis accelerometer, 3 axis gyroscope); 2 × analog sticks; 2 × analog triggers (L2, R2); 13 × digital buttons (L1, R1, L3, R3, "PS", CREATE, OPTIONS, touchpad click, mute microphone); Digital directional buttons; 2 point capacitive touchpad with click mechanism (see buttons); Dual-microphone array
- Connectivity: USB-C, Bluetooth 5.1, 3.5 mm TRRS (CTIA) stereo headset jack
- Power: 3.65 V 1560 mAh Li-ion battery, USB 3.0 host powered
- Dimensions: 160 mm × 66 mm × 106 mm (6.3 in × 2.6 in × 4.2 in)
- Weight: 280 g (9.88 oz)
- Predecessor: DualShock 4

The DualSense (CFI-ZCT1W) is the PlayStation 5's controller. Unveiled on April 7, 2020, It is based on the DualShock 4 controller; changes to its design and capabilities were influenced by discussions with game designers and players. It weighs 280 g (9.9 oz) and has dimensions of 160 mm × 66 mm × 106 mm (6.3 in × 2.6 in × 4.2 in).

The DualSense is primarily white with black facing. Its monochrome action buttons are the first non-colored action buttons for a standard PlayStation controller. (Sony's handheld consoles, the PlayStation Vita and PlayStation Portable, had monochrome buttons.) Its more ergonomic design is bigger, rounder, and heftier than the DualShock 4. The light bar has been moved from the top of the controller to the horizontal edges of the touchpad; player number is indicated by five LEDs below the touchpad. The "Share" button has been replaced with "Create" to emphasize creating content to share. The black plastic piece surrounding the analog sticks can be removed without tools.

The DualSense supports vibrotactile haptic through voice coil actuators in the palm grips, and the analog triggers (dubbed "adaptive triggers") now have a force feedback mechanism provided by two DC rotary motors. The actuators enable games to provide varied feedback, such as feeling the wind and sand in a sandstorm. The adaptive triggers provide varying levels of resistance to the user depending on game actions. An example provided by Sony is being able to feel the tension of a bow string as the user pulls the trigger.

Connectivity includes a 3.5 mm audio jack; USB-C, which replaces the microUSB port on the DualShock 4; and copper pins for use with charging docks. The controller speaker provides a clearer sound. The controller also has a dual-microphone array, allowing players to communicate without an external headset and enabling Sony to introduce voice typing to the PS5. The controller has a rechargeable 3.65 V, 1560 mAh lithium-ion battery, which can be charged while in rest mode.

=== DualSense Edge ===
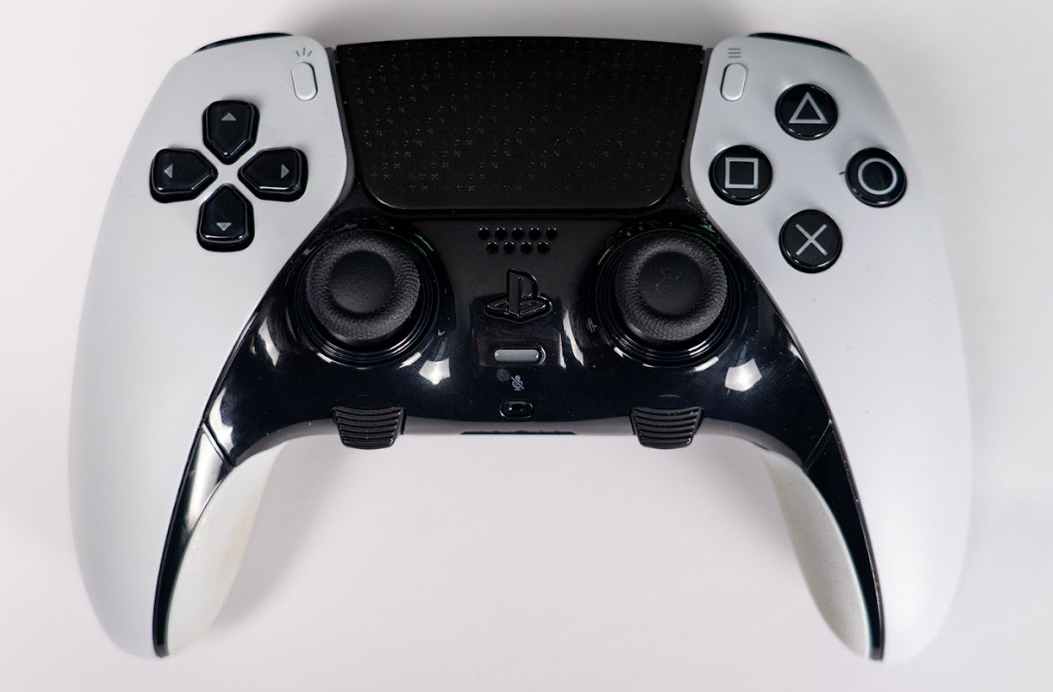
DualSense Edge controller

Unveiled in August 2022, the DualSense Edge (CFI-ZCP1) is a new controller for the PlayStation 5 with more capabilities. It was released on January 26, 2023, on PlayStation Direct, then sold through other retailers beginning on February 23, 2023.

The DualSense Edge has a more modular design than the DualSense, featuring replaceable analog stick modules, interchangeable analog stick caps (standard DualSense caps, and high- and low-convex dome caps that also resembled earlier DualShock analog sticks prior to the DualShock 4) and rear paddle buttons, adjustable trigger lengths, multiple control profiles as well as customizable mapping inputs. It also includes a lockable braided USB-C cable.

=== Legal issues ===
The DualSense has become a subject of a class-action lawsuit due to a perceived drift in one of the analog sticks, being litigated by the same firm that is challenging Nintendo for a similar drift issue in its Joy-Con controllers for the Nintendo Switch.

=== Microtexture ===
As a hidden easter egg, the DualSense has a unique microtexture. There are 40,000 tiny symbols stacked on top of each other, consisting of the four PlayStation button symbols (triangle, circle, cross, square). Multiple designs were hand-drawn, digitized, and made as prototypes before the design team settled on the current design. The larger symbols are half a millimeter wide.

Sean Hollister, writing for The Verge, wrote an article examining the microtexture and its creation:

The company decided to apply a microtexture to the DualSense controller's entire lower shell [making it] Sony's most grippable gamepad yet because of the thousands upon thousands of tiny squares, triangles, circles, and crosses literally at your fingertips. ... These tiny symbols are stacked on top of each other, jutting out in three dimensions. They're not a single, evenly spaced layer at all ... Morisawa, the senior art director of Sony's Design Center product design group, explains that a variety of designs were handcrafted, digitized, mocked up, applied to actual prototype gamepads, and tested over and over again until the teams found the balance they wanted: good-looking, textured enough to be comfortable and non-slip, but not so sandpaper-rough that it'd hurt your hands over a lengthy gaming session.

Hollister also mentioned that the one downside to the microtexture is that "it picks up dirt extremely easily and doesn't want to let go".

=== Variations ===
The DualSense has been produced in various colors: White, Cosmic Red, Midnight Black, Galactic Purple, Nova Pink, Starlight Blue, Gray Camouflage, Cobalt Blue, Volcanic Red, Sterling Silver, Chroma Indigo, Chroma Pearl, & Chroma Teal. Sony has also released limited/special editions of the DualSense, which includes controllers themed after God of War Ragnarök, Hogwarts Legacy, LeBron James, Final Fantasy XVI (Japan Only), Marvel’s Spider-Man 2, Concord (US Only), two Astro Bot versions, Fortnite, the PlayStation 30th Anniversary, Helldivers 2, Monster Hunter Wilds (Japan Only), The Last of Us, Death Stranding 2: On the Beach, Ghost of Yōtei, the twentieth anniversary of the God of War franchise, and Grand Theft Auto VI.

== Third-party software ==
While the DualShock 4 and DualSense controllers are fully compatible with Mac computers running macOS and Apple devices running iOS, the DualShock 3 is only natively supported on macOS. On iOS, the DualShock 3 is not supported without third-party software or jailbreaking due to its non-standard Bluetooth pairing requirements.

=== DS4Windows ===
DS4Windows is an open-source software application that allows various PlayStation controllers to be used on PCs running versions of Microsoft Windows up to 11 by emulating a virtual Xbox or DualShock 4 controller. Specifically, this is relevant for DualShock 3, DualShock 4, DualSense and DualSense Edge controllers, enabling them to function effectively on PC platforms. The software supports key remapping and rebinding, allowing for customization of controller settings for games that do not natively support PlayStation controllers. DS4Windows features both USB and Bluetooth connectivity and offers customizable profiles for gamepad settings.

While primarily made for PlayStation controllers such as the DualShock, some Nintendo controllers including the Switch's Joy-Con and Switch Pro controllers are also supported by the software, allowing them to be played on PCs outside of their respective consoles. Third-party controllers for the PlayStation 4 and PlayStation 5 are also compatible with varying levels of compatibility.

== Reception ==
The DualShock controller was given a Technology & Engineering Emmy Award for "Peripheral Development and Technological Impact of Video Game Controllers" by the National Academy of Television Arts and Sciences on January 8, 2007.
