= Sixaxis =

Wireless gamepad by Sony

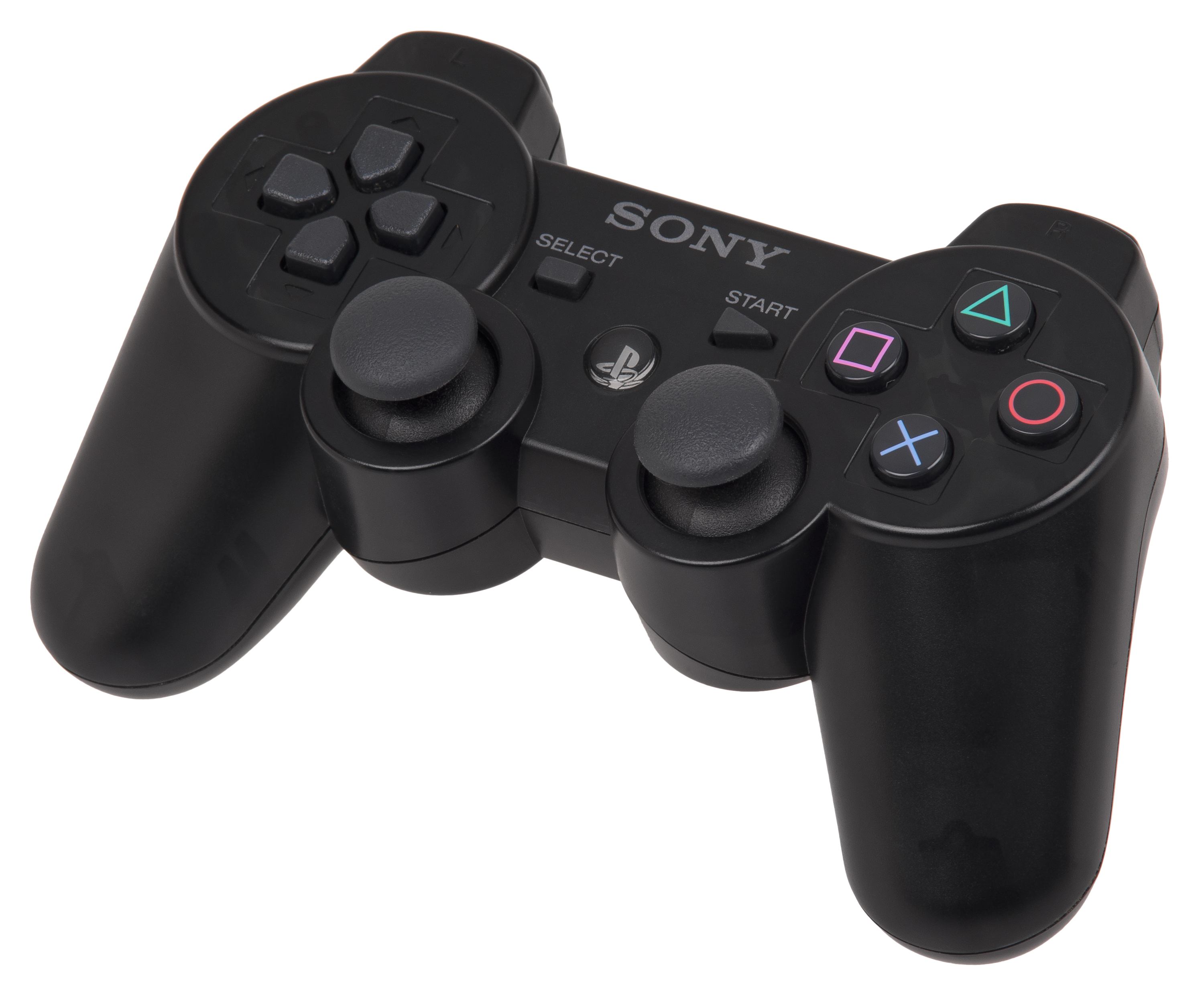
- Developer: Sony Computer Entertainment
- Manufacturer: Sony
- Type: Gamepad
- Generation: Seventh
- Released: November 11, 2006
- Input: Motion sensing (3 axes, 6 DoF); 2 × Analog sticks (10-bit precision); 2 × Analog triggers (L2, R2); 6 × Pressure-sensitive buttons (L1, R1); Pressure-sensitive D-pad; 5 × Digital buttons ("PS", L3, R3, Start, Select)
- Connectivity: USB, Bluetooth (PlayStation 3 and PSP Go)
- Power: 3.7 V Li-ion battery, USB host powered
- Dimensions: 157 mm × 95 mm × 55 mm 6.18 in × 3.74 in × 2.16 in
- Weight: 137.1 g 4.83 oz
- Predecessor: DualShock 2
- Successor: DualShock 3

The Sixaxis (trademarked SIXAXIS) is a wireless gamepad produced by Sony for their PlayStation 3 video game console. It was introduced alongside the PlayStation 3 in 2006 and remained the console's official controller until 2008.

The term "sixaxis" was used to refer to the motion-sensing technology in PlayStation 3 controllers. It is a contraction of "six axis", which refers to the ability to sense motion in all axes of the six degrees of freedom. The name is a misnomer because there are only three axes: X, Y, and Z, which allows six degrees of freedom (rotation about each axis and translation along each axis). The Sixaxis name is also a palindrome, meaning that it can written the same way forwards and backwards.

At the time of the PlayStation 3's development, the DualShock 3, which like the DualShock and DualShock 2 controllers, would have incorporated haptic technology – also known as force feedback, was originally slated to be released alongside the console in time for its intended launch; however, Sony was in the midst of appealing a decision from a 2004 lawsuit involving patent infringement claimed by Immersion. The two companies were at odds over the haptic feedback technology used in earlier PlayStation controllers. The legal battle led to a decision to remove the vibration capabilities from the PS3 controller's initial design, which became known as Sixaxis.

The Sixaxis was succeeded by the vibration-capable DualShock 3 in late 2007 and early 2008. The Sixaxis and the DualShock 3 controller can also be used with PSP Go and the PlayStation TV via Bluetooth after registering the controller on a PlayStation 3 console.

== History ==
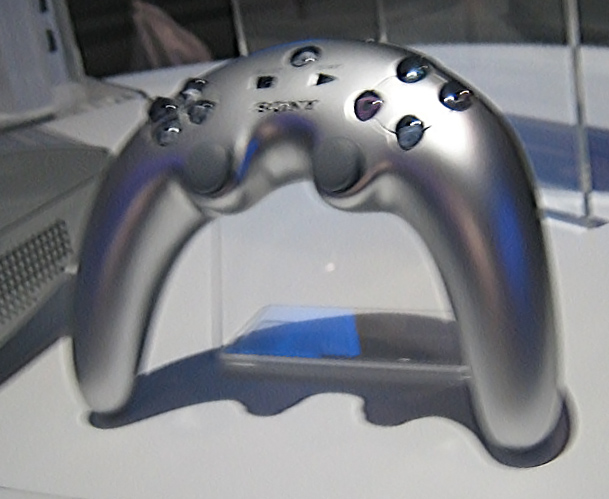
The original "Boomerang" or "Banana" controller as shown at E3 2005, which was soon abandoned after its poor reception

At E3 2005, Sony showcased a "boomerang" design for the PlayStation 3's controller, which is not used on any shipped controller. This design was poorly received, and Sony later stated that the original controller "was very clearly designed as a design concept, and was never intended to be the final controller, despite what everybody said about it".

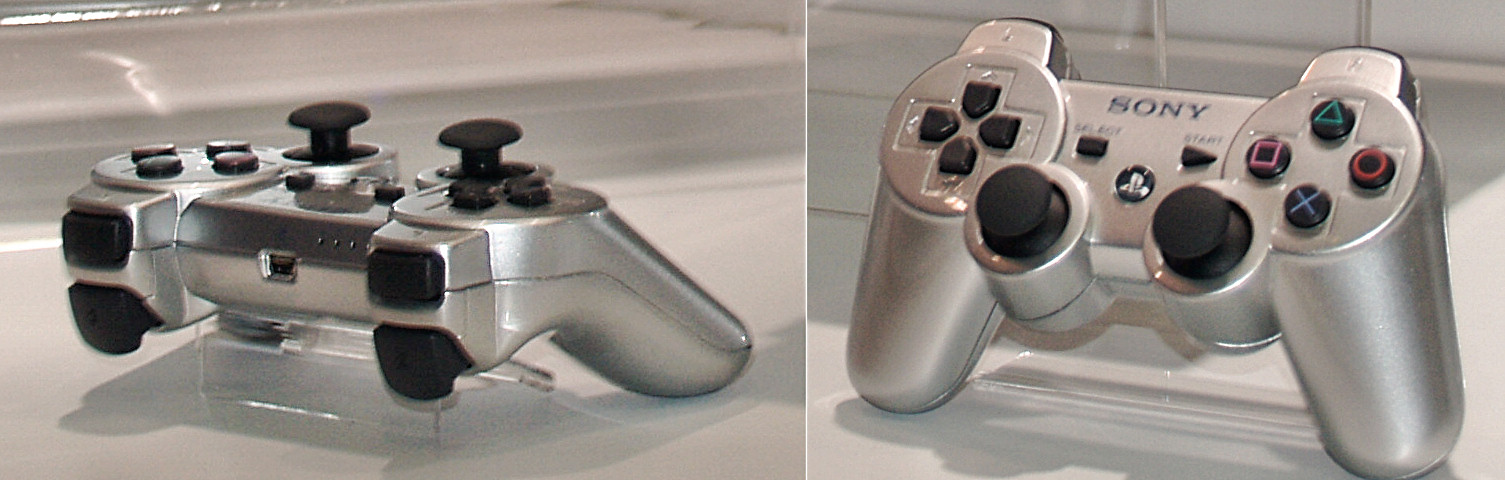
Prototype silver Sixaxis controller as shown at the E3 2006, which did not feature "Sixaxis" branding on the top

At E3 2006, Sony announced the Sixaxis; a wireless, motion sensitive controller, similar in overall design to the earlier PlayStation DualShock controllers. This controller was bundled with all new systems from launch, beginning with the 20 GB (CECHBxx) and 60 GB (CECHAxx & CECHCxx) models, until the introduction of the revised 80 GB (CECHKxx, CECHLxx & CECHMxx) model, which replaced the Sixaxis with the then-new DualShock 3 as the standard pack-in controller for the system; the DualShock 3 added the vibration feature that was missing from the Sixaxis while retaining the design, features and functionality of the former.

The Sixaxis controller was later phased out and replaced by the DualShock 3 controller completely and is no longer being produced in any region. Despite this, the Sixaxis survived the longest in Europe, where the Metal Gear Solid 4: Guns of the Patriots PlayStation 3 bundle for that region released in the summer of 2008 included a Sixaxis (all other MGS4 PlayStation 3 bundles in other regions except Europe included the DualShock 3).

== Features and design ==
A major feature of the Sixaxis controller, and from where its name is derived, is the ability to sense both rotational orientation and translational acceleration along all three-dimensional axes, providing six degrees of freedom. This became a matter of controversy, as the circumstances of the announcement, made less than eight months after Nintendo revealed motion-sensing capabilities in its new game console controller (see Wii Remote), led to speculation that the addition of motion-sensing was a late-stage decision by Sony to follow Nintendo's move. Also, some comments from Incognito Entertainment, the developer behind Warhawk, said that it received development controllers with the motion-sensing feature only 10 days or so before E3. Developer Brian Upton from Santa Monica Studio later clarified that Incognito had been secretly working on the motion-sensing technology "for a while", but was also withheld a working controller until "the last few weeks before E3".

The Sixaxis features finer analog sensitivity than the DualShock 2, increased to 10-bit precision from the 8-bit precision of the DualShock 2. The controller also uses both analog and digital signals simultaneously at all times during gameplay, which necessitated the removal of the "Analog" mode button found in previous Sony dual analog controllers (Dual Analog, DualShock and DualShock 2). In its place was a jewel-like "PS button" with the PlayStation logo, which can be used to access the home menu or XMB (after system software version 2.40), switch controller inputs and turn the console or the controller on or off. It fulfills a similar function to the "Guide" button featured on Microsoft's Xbox 360 controller, or the "Home" button on the Wii Remote. The frame beneath the L2 and R2 buttons has been omitted and the buttons themselves have been made trigger-like, with the range of travel determining the degree of analog input rather than the range of pressure. The Sixaxis is predominantly coloured black, but other colours were available. The controller's housing is in a slightly translucent shell compared to its predecessors, the DualShock 2, DualShock and Dual Analog, which allowed some light to pass through the controller. This was changed back to an opaque shell similar to that of the DualShock 2 for the DualShock 3.

=== Lack of vibration capability ===
Sony announced that because of the included motion sensors, the vibration feature of previous PlayStation controllers was removed, stating that the vibration would interfere with motion-sensing. This therefore made the PS3 wireless controller feel light to players accustomed to heavier controllers such as the DualShock. Haptics developer Immersion Corporation, which had successfully sued Sony for patent infringement, expressed skepticism of Sony's rationale, with company president Victor Viegas stating in an interview, "I don't believe it's a very difficult problem to solve, and Immersion has experts that would be happy to solve that problem for them", under the condition that Sony withdraw its appeal of the patent infringement ruling. Immersion later emphasized compatibility with motion-sensing when introducing its next-generation vibration feedback technology, TouchSense. The Wii Remote, another contemporary motion controller that was released the same year as the PlayStation 3, was able to incorporate vibration; these vibration designs didn't fall into Immersion and Sony's patent infringement lawsuit as their implementation of vibration technology uses a different design.

Subsequent statements from Sony were dismissive of the arguments from Immersion, with SCEA Senior VP of Marketing Peter Dille stating, "It seems like the folks at Immersion are looking to sort of negotiate through the press and try to make their case to us … we've talked about how there's a potential for that rumble to interfere with the Sixaxis controller." However, in a press release made some eight months later, Phil Harrison, Sony's president of Worldwide Studios at the time, said he didn't see a need for Sony's controllers to have rumble, noting that it was the "last generation feature" and that he thought "motion sensitivity is [the next-generation feature]." He added that rumble and other forms of feedback would continue to be valuable for certain types of games, however that would most likely come from third-party controllers.

In the end, Sony would later decide to include rumble functionality in their DualShock 3 controller after finally settling on the lawsuit in early 2007.

=== Wireless technology ===
In a change from previous PlayStation controllers, the Sixaxis features wireless connectivity based on the Bluetooth standard. However, the Sixaxis lacks a Bluetooth "discovery mode", which is normally used for connecting to Bluetooth devices wirelessly, so a wired USB connection is required to set up the Sixaxis with the appropriate Bluetooth address before a wireless connection can be made. When used with the PSP Go or the PlayStation TV, a PS3 is required to set up the Sixaxis. This was retained for the DualShock 3.

Both the Sixaxis and the DualShock 3 are fully compatible with Apple Mac computers running macOS (formerly known as Mac OS X and OS X), as they work out of the box with no external software required. Additional work is needed to support Sixaxis and DualShock 3 controllers on PCs running Microsoft Windows or Android devices, which includes using custom software and Bluetooth drivers or in the case of Android, an app and root access. DS4Windows is one example of an application for Windows that allows the use of Sixaxis or DualShock 3 controllers using an emulated Xbox or DualShock 4 controller.

=== Power ===
The Sixaxis wireless controller features an internal 3.7 V Li-ion battery, which provides up to 30 hours of continuous gaming on a full charge. Third party replacement batteries are also available. The battery was originally not thought to be replaceable when a Sony spokesperson stated that the Sixaxis should operate for "many years before there's any degradation in terms of battery performance. When and if this happens, then of course Sony will be providing a service to exchange these items". Later, it was revealed that the Sixaxis came with instructions on how to remove the battery and that the battery was fully removable. The DualShock 3 also uses this battery.

The Sixaxis can also draw power over a USB cable via a USB mini-B connector on the top of the controller. This allows the controller to be used when the battery is low and is also used for charging the battery. When connected via USB, the controller will communicate with the console over the USB connection, rather than wirelessly. This also applies to the DualShock 3.

=== LEDs ===
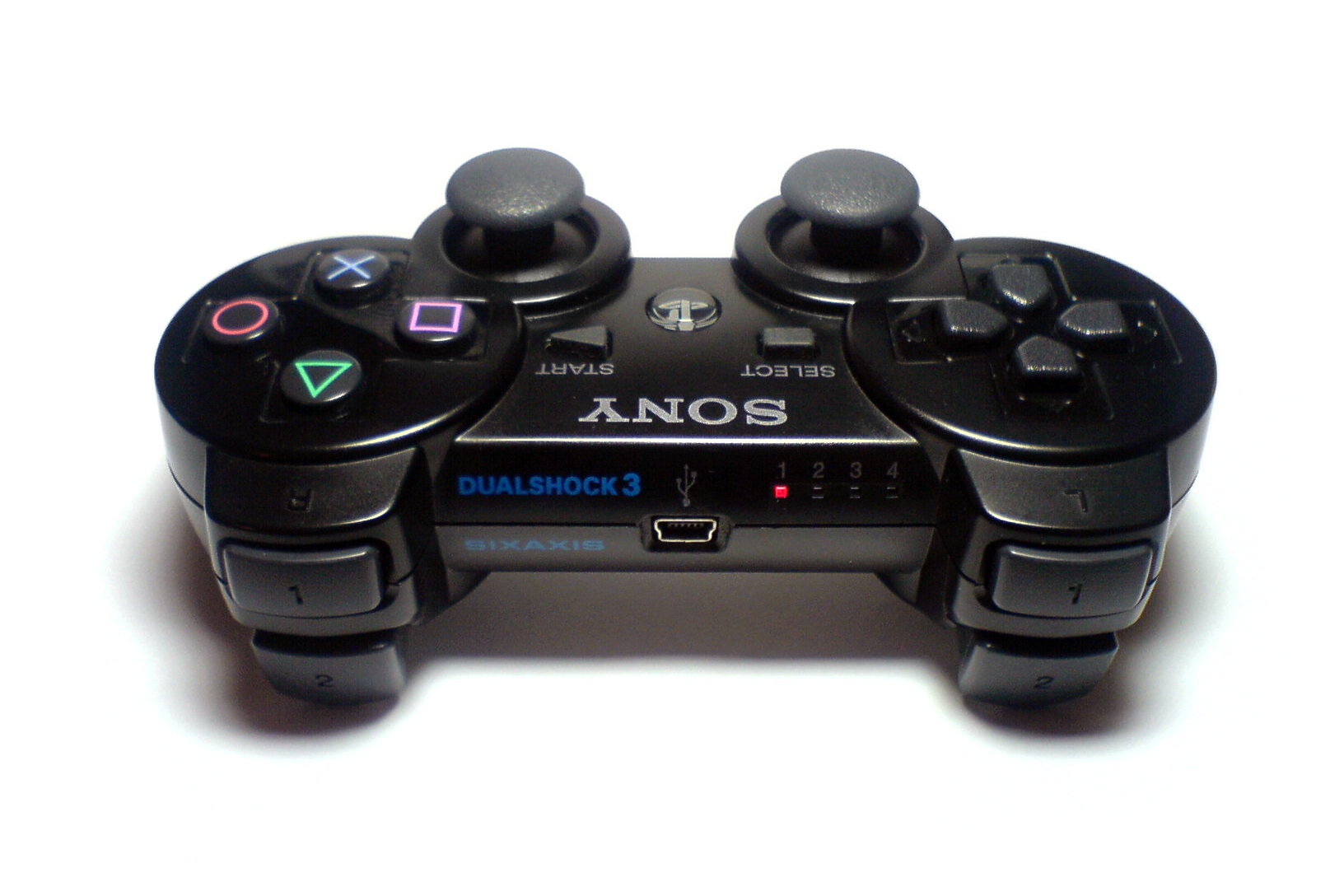
The top of a DualShock 3 Sixaxis controller, LED lights on the right

On the top of the controller is a row of four numbered LEDs, which are used to identify and distinguish multiple wireless controllers. These are similar to the indicators found on the Wii remote and the ring of light on the Xbox 360 Controller. Since the PlayStation 3 supports up to 7 controllers, controllers 5, 6 and 7 are represented as the sum of two other indicators despite having 4 LEDs (for example controller 5 is represented by illuminating indicators '4' and '1' at the same time, since 4+1=5).

Sony also patented a technology to be able to track the motion of these LEDs with the PlayStation Eye camera for use alongside the PlayStation Move Controller. Though this was never utilised on the Sixaxis or the DualShock 3, its successor, the DualShock 4, features a light bar used for motion tracking, as well as player identification.

== See also ==
- DualShock
  - DualShock 3
- Microsoft SideWinder Freestyle Pro
- PlayStation 3
- PlayStation 3 accessories
- PlayStation Move
- Xbox 360 controller
- Wii Remote
