= Louis Rosenberg =

Louis Rosenberg may refer to:

- Louis Conrad Rosenberg, (1890–1983), American printmaker
- Louis Rosenberg (judge) (1898–1999), United States federal judge
- Lou Rosenberg (1904–1991), American professional baseball player
- Louis B. Rosenberg, (born 1969) American engineer, researcher, inventor, and entrepreneur
