= Immersion v. Sony =

US legal case

- Court: United States District Court for the Northern District of California
- Full case name: Immersion Corporation v. Sony Computer Entertainment America Inc. et al
- Decided: March 8, 2006
- Docket nos.: 4:02-cv-00710
- Defendant: Sony Computer Entertainment America
- Plaintiff: Immersion Corporation

Case history
- Subsequent actions: Affirmed, 239 F. App'x 578 (Fed. Cir. 2007)

Court membership
- Judge sitting: Claudia Ann Wilken

In February 2002, Sony and Microsoft were sued by Immersion Corporation for patent infringement for the use of haptic technology in their gaming controllers. The lawsuit was filed in the United States District Court for the Northern District of California. Microsoft settled the matter out of court, but Sony defended the case. Sony lost the case in September 2004 and appealed the decision.

Sony lost the appeal at the US District Court level in March 2006, resulting in the suspension of the sale of controllers containing the patented technology, including PlayStation and PlayStation 2 console packages. It also led to the removal of the vibration functionality from the PlayStation 3 controller at launch. An agreement was reached with both companies in March 2007, resulting in Sony paying Immersion Corporation $97.2 million in addition to royalties.

== Background ==
Sony and Microsoft were accused of infringing on claims in US Patent 6,424,333 and US Patent 6,275,213 (filed 2000 and 2001 as extensions of US Patent 6,088,017, itself filed 1998, all "tactile feedback man-machine interface device"). Both patents were continuation applications of a patent application originally filed in November 1995.

Nintendo was not involved in the case, as the technology used in the Rumble Pak and GameCube controllers is based on a different design, for which Nintendo holds the patents US Patent 6,200,253 and US Patent 6,676,520 based on a Japan patent application filed on October 9, 1995.

== Appellate history ==
While Microsoft settled out of court, purchasing a 10 percent share in Immersion, Sony continued to defend the case. Immersion's lead attorney in this case was Morgan Chu. The defense centered on a force feedback controller patent, which Sony licensed from Logitech during 1998. Sony lost, with the jury awarding Immersion $82 million which, with the judge's addition of pre-judgment interest and costs, resulted in a total award of $90.7 million. In addition, the judgment required Sony to suspend the sale of controllers containing the patented technology, including PlayStation and PlayStation 2 console packages. Sony appealed this decision and was able to sell its products while the appeal was being heard. On March 8, 2006, Sony lost the appeal at the US District Court level and subsequently appealed to the US Court of Appeals for the Federal Circuit. The order to halt sales of the infringing controllers was again stayed pending the outcome of the appeal.

== Significance and settlement ==
At E3 2006, Sony announced the vibration functionality would be removed from the PlayStation 3 controller, stating the vibration would interfere with the motion-sensing feature of the controller. It has been speculated that the removal of vibration is related to the lawsuit, and Immersion President Victor Viegas has been dismissive of Sony's stated rationale.

On March 1, 2007, Sony Computer Entertainment and Immersion Corporation announced that both companies agreed to end their patent litigation and entered a business agreement to "explore the inclusion of Immersion technology in PlayStation format products." As part of the agreement reached between the two companies, Immersion would receive the full amount dictated by the District Court, which with interest was stated to total $97.2 million, in addition to royalties. On top of the $30.6 million in compulsory license fees that Sony had paid Immersion over the previous two years, Sony would make 12 more licensing payments through the end of 2009, totaling $22.5 million, including other royalties. The agreement also provided Sony with "new rights with respect to Immersion's patent portfolio." Sony released the DualShock 3 wireless controller with haptic feedback in the United States on April 15, 2008.
