= Unanimous A.I. =

American technology company specializing in artificial swarm intelligence

Unanimous AI
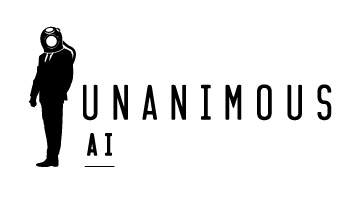
- Type: Private
- Founded: 2014
- Founder: Louis Rosenberg
- Headquarters: San Francisco, California, United States
- Website: http://unanimous.ai/

Unanimous AI is an American technology company that pursues collective superintelligence by connecting networked human groups together at large scale using AI agents and other AI technologies.

The company provides two AI technologies, artificial swarm intelligence (ASI) which was first presented publicly in 2015 and Hyperchat AI technology. that was first presented publicly in 2023.

In 2015, Unanimous AI released a "human swarming" platform called "swarm.ai" (formally called UNU) that uses ASI technology to allow distributed groups of users to collectively predict answers to questions. This process has resulted in successful predictions of events such as the Kentucky Derby, the Oscars, the Stanley Cup, presidential elections, and the World Series.

In 2016, Unanimous AI received national attention for its swarm-based artificial intelligence technology when a CBS Interactive reporter challenged the company to predict the first four finishers, in order, in the Kentucky Derby. Their prediction, reported by TechRepublic and Newsweek, was correct. The reporter's $20 bet on the prediction resulted in a payout of $11,000.

In 2018, the firm collaborated with Stanford University School of Medicine to study using artificial swarming algorithms for diagnostics.

Building a "Hive Mind" using Swarm AI technology

In 2020, the firm published an accurate forecast for the 2020 United States presidential election, including correct predictions for all 11 battleground states, and an accurate prediction of the baseball 2020 World Series

Swarm has also been used by companies like Credit Suisse on predicting stock markets and Disney on predicting the success of films by tapping into collective intelligence.

In 2024, the company introduced a collaboration platform called Thinkscape.ai that incorporates Hyperchat AI technology and supports real-time communication among teams of up to 250 participants through text, voice, or video conferencing.
