= Louis B. Rosenberg =

American engineer and entrepreneur, born 1969

Louis Barry Rosenberg
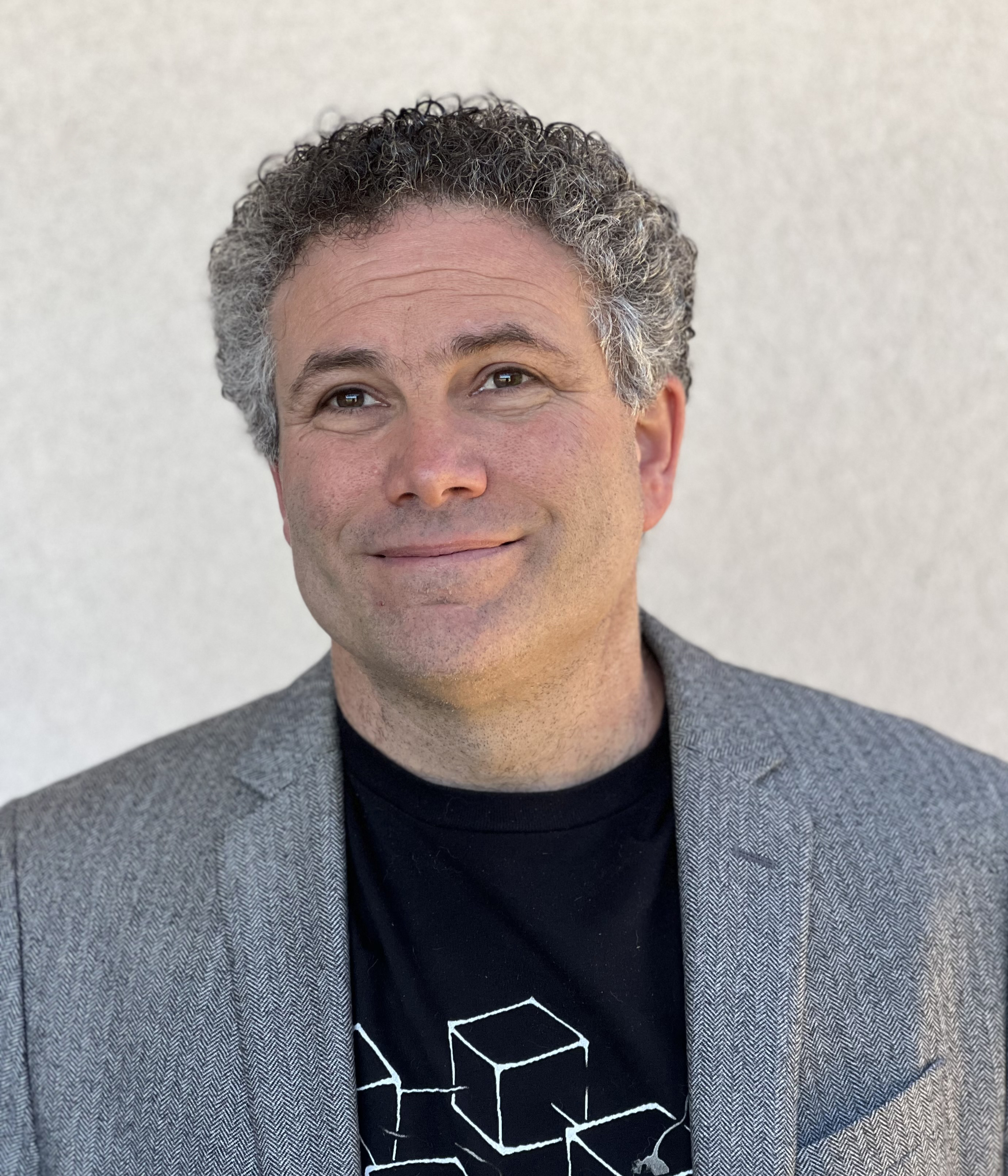
- Rosenberg in 2022
- Education: Stanford University (BS, MS, PhD); UCLA School of Theater, Film and Television
- Children: Zoe Rosenberg
- Scientific career
- Fields: Artificial intelligence, augmented reality, virtual reality, haptic technology
- Workplaces: California Polytechnic State University; Unanimous A.I.; Immersion Corporation
- Thesis: "Virtual fixtures": perceptual overlays enhance operator performance in telepresence tasks (1994)
- Doctoral advisor: Larry John Leifer

Louis Barry Rosenberg (born 1969) is an American engineer, researcher, inventor, and entrepreneur. He researches augmented reality, virtual reality, and artificial intelligence. He was the Cotchett Endowed Professor of Educational Technology at the California Polytechnic (Cal Poly). He founded the Immersion Corporation and Unanimous A.I., and he wrote the screenplay for the 2009 romantic comedy film, Lab Rats.

Rosenberg developed artificial swarm intelligence, which is intended to amplify the collective intelligence of networked human groups (2014–2023), He developed the haptic computer mouse and haptic GUI (1993–1999) and did work to develop augmented reality at the Air Force Research Laboratory (1991–1994).

== Early life and family ==
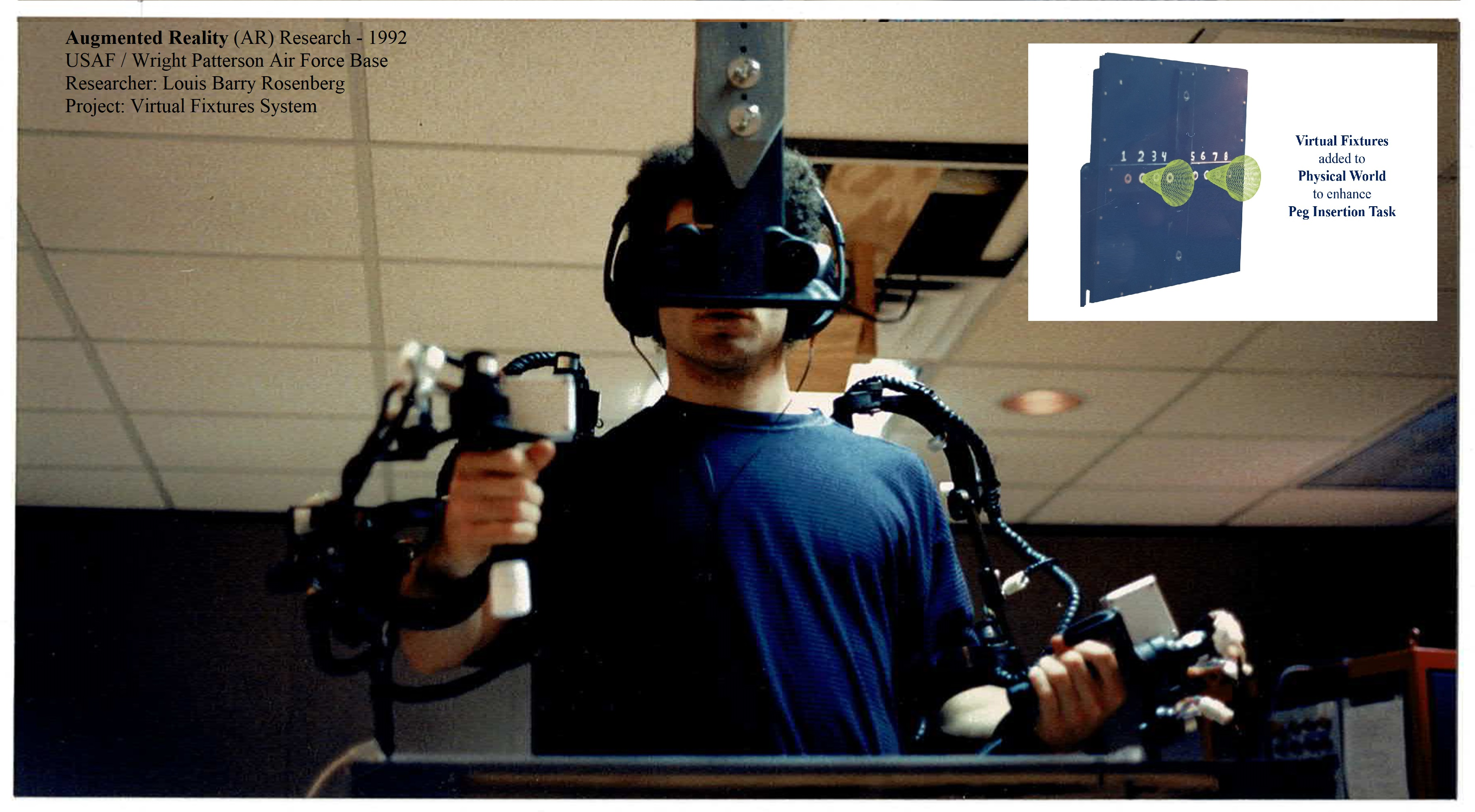
Rosenberg in 1992 developing early Augmented Reality / Mixed Reality system (US Air Force, Virtual Fixtures project)

Louis Rosenberg was born in 1969. His parents purchased his first computer in 1980 and he began writing programs. He has said, "If I spelled things wrong it would give me a syntax error and let me try again... that's a helpful feature for someone who is dyslexic."

Rosenberg earned a B.S. (1991), M.S. (1993), and Ph.D. (1994) in Mechanical Engineering from Stanford University. His daughter, Zoe Rosenberg, is an animal rights activist.

== Career ==
From 1991 to 1994, Rosenberg was a researcher of virtual and augmented reality at Stanford University, NASA Ames Research Center, and Air Force Research Laboratory (formerly Armstrong Laboratory).

In 1993, Rosenberg founded a virtual reality and haptics company Immersion Corporation, and served as its CEO until 2000.

In 1999, Logitech released the first haptic-enabled computer mouse using FEELit technology he developed with other researchers at Immersion Corporation. As CEO, he brought the company public on NASDAQ in 1999 and it remains public today trading as "IMMR" as a part of Russell 2000 component.

In 2002, Rosenberg founded Outland Research, a company that developed augmented reality technology.

In 2005, Rosenberg joined the faculty of California Polytechnic as an assistant professor. Later, he became the Cotchett Endowed Professor of Educational Technology at Cal Poly.

In 2014, Rosenberg founded Unanimous A.I. on the basis of a novel technology known as Artificial Swarm Intelligence, which is based on the decision-making abilities of biological swarms and is used to enhance the collective intelligence of networked human groups.

Rosenberg has been a vocal critic of the potential risks that virtual reality, augmented reality, and artificial intelligence pose to society in recent years. He has written about these technologies for VentureBeat and Big Think.

In 2023, Rosenberg wrote and produced the short film "Privacy Lost" about the manipulative risks of artificial intelligence and augmented reality. The film won awards at the Hong Kong Indie Film Festival, the Santa Cruz Film Festival, and the Rio de Janeiro World Film Festival.

In 2024, Rosenberg's Our Next Reality was published by Hachette Book Group. The book is about the impacts that artificial intelligence and mixed reality will have on society.

== Research ==
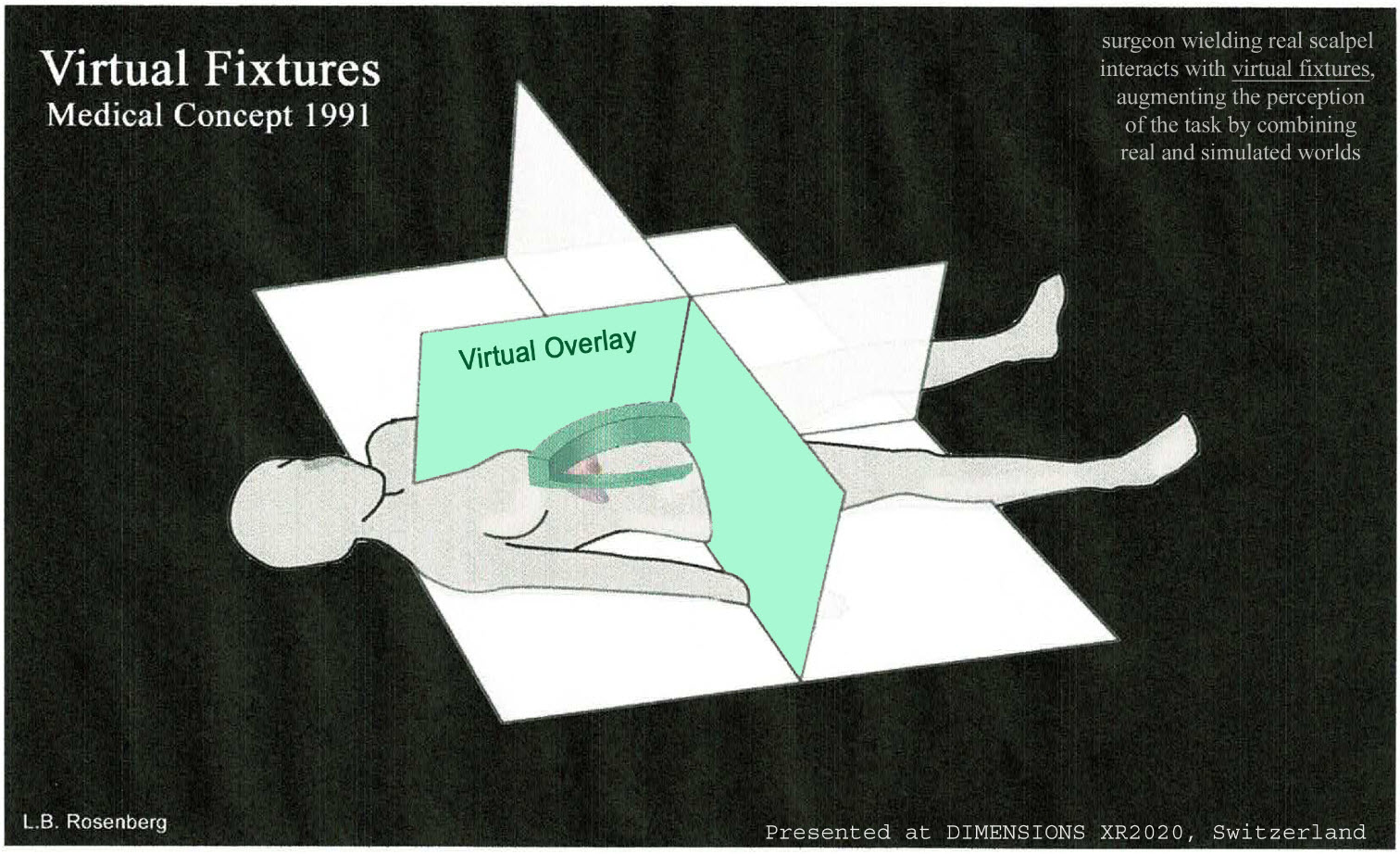
Virtual Fixtures (medical concept 1991)

In 2014, Rosenberg started research in a relatively new sub-field of AI, now known as, artificial swarm intelligence (swarm AI in short), that aims to amplify the intelligence of human groups using AI algorithms modeled on biological swarms. In 2014, he founded Unanimous A.I., an artificial intelligence company. He has served as the company's CEO since the company was founded.

Rosenberg conducted early research into virtual and augmented reality at NASA's Ames Research Center and at the Air Force Research Laboratory, developing the Virtual Fixtures platform, one of the first prototype augmented reality systems to enable human subjects to interact with mixed reality of real and virtual objects.

From 2018 to 2020, Rosenberg collaborated with researchers at Stanford University School of Medicine on a National Science Foundation funded study conducted on groups of radiologists, which was published in Nature Digital Medicine on "Human–machine partnership with artificial intelligence for chest radiograph diagnosis", related to the symbiosis of human experts and AI deep learning algorithms. With the help of researchers from the Massachusetts Institute of Technology (MIT), he studied applications of Swarm AI in order to create so-called "hive minds" of financial analysts for equity markets.

Rosenberg's research has focused on using AI algorithms modeled on biological swarms to support group decision-making in various fields including forecasting, estimation, and diagnosis.

== Writing ==
Rosenberg studied screenwriting at UCLA School of Theater, Film and Television. In 2009, he wrote the screenplay for the short romantic comedy film Lab Rats directed by Sam Washington. The short won awards at the Moondance International Film Festival and the Ventura Film Festival. He also wrote a feature film screenplay entitled The Manuscript in collaboration with another writer, Joe Rosenbaum, which was sold in 2018 for screen adaptation.

== Selected publications ==
=== Books ===
- Rosenberg, L.B. (1993). "Virtual fixtures: Perceptual tools for telerobotic manipulation". Proceedings of IEEE Virtual Reality Annual International Symposium. Seattle, WA, USA: IEEE. pp. 76–82. doi:10.1109/VRAIS.1993.380795. ISBN 978-0-7803-1363-7. S2CID 9856738.
- Graylin, Alvin Wang; Rosenberg, Louis (2024). Our Next Reality: How the AI-powered Metaverse Will Reshape the World. Hodder And Stoughton Limited. ISBN 978-1-3998-1225-2.

=== Articles ===
- Jackson, Bernie G.; Rosenberg, Louis B. (1995). "Force Feedback and Medical Simulation". Interactive Technology and the New Paradigm for Healthcare. Studies in Health Technology and Informatics. pp. 147–151. doi:10.3233/978-1-60750-862-5-147.
- Rosenberg, Louis B.; Brave, Scott (April 10, 1996). "Use of force feedback to enhance graphical user interfaces". In Bolas, Mark T.; Fisher, Scott S.; Merritt, John O. (eds.). Stereoscopic Displays and Virtual Reality Systems III. Proceedings of SPIE. Vol. 2653. pp. 243–248. Bibcode:1996SPIE.2653..243R. doi:10.1117/12.237444.
