= Zoe Rosenberg =

Animal rights activist

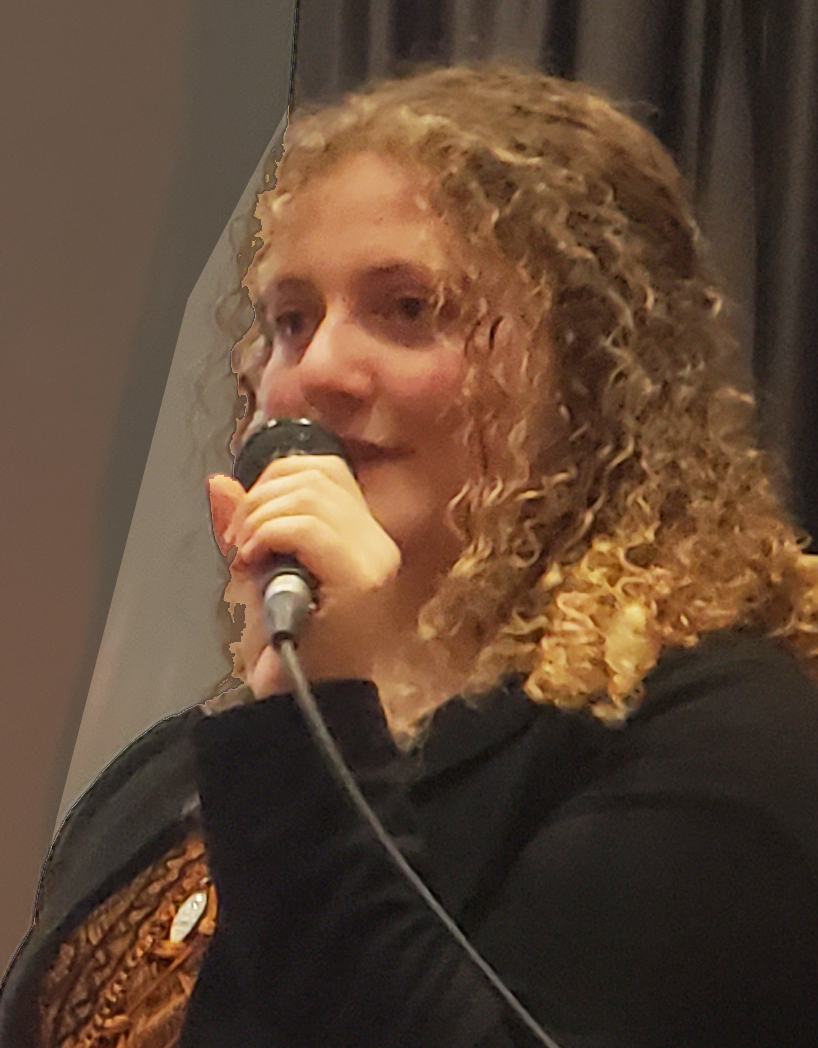
- Rosenberg in 2018
- Education: University of California, Berkeley
- Occupations: Animal rights activist, sanctuary operator
- Years active: 2014–present
- Known for: Animal Rights Activism, High Profile Court case involving theft of Chickens from Petaluma Poultry
- Father: Louis B. Rosenberg

Zoe Rosenberg (born 2002) is an American animal rights activist, and animal sanctuary founder. She participates in public forms of direct action at sporting and university events. In 2014, Rosenberg founded the Happy Hen Animal Sanctuary based in San Luis Obispo, California. Rosenberg made national headlines for rescuing four chickens from Perdue Farm's Slaughterhouse in Petaluma, California in 2023. Subsequently, she was convicted on 1 felony and 2 misdemeanor counts in that case, and sentenced to jail, probation, and ordered to pay restitution.

== Early life and education ==
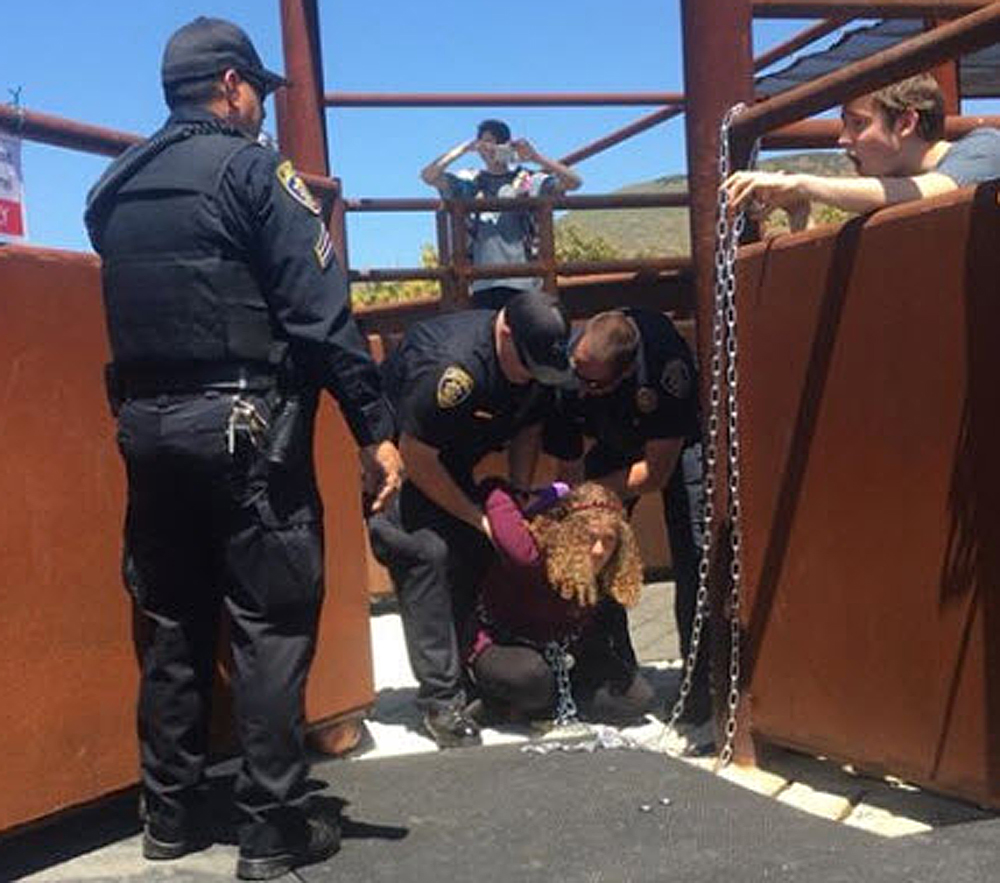
Rosenberg arrest at Cal Poly in April 2018

Rosenberg was born in California to veterinarian Sherstin Rosenberg and entrepreneur Louis B. Rosenberg. She was raised in a vegetarian household and became vegan at the age of 11. In 2014, she founded the Happy Hen Chicken Rescue at age 11 which expanded over time to become the Happy Hen Animal Sanctuary. She attended the University of California Berkeley, where she was president of the university chapter of Direct Action Everywhere and led protests against the University for its alleged ties to factory farms and graduated in May 2025.

== Activism ==
In July 2016, Rosenberg was arrested at age 14 on live TV during a LA Dodgers baseball game for pitch invasion protesting the alleged maltreatment of farm animals by a meat supplier used for "Dodger Dog" hotdogs sold at the stadium. Rosenberg recounted her arrest on the pitcher's mound at Dodger Stadium in a TEDx talk she gave at age 16 entitled "Taking the Mound".

During an October 2016 discussion, hosted at the California Polytechnic State University, San Luis Obispo, she gave Whole Foods Market co-CEO Walter Robb a flower in protest of alleged animal deaths. In December 2017, Rosenberg protested outside the Charles Paddock Zoo.

In February 2018, Rosenberg was a 15-year-old student at Olive Grove Charter School in San Luis Obispo, California when she was also an operator of her animal sanctuary and an animal rights activist. The same year, she was an organizer of the San Luis Obispo chapter of Direct Action Everywhere (DxE).

In April 2018, she chained herself in protest to a slaughterhouse gate on the campus of the California Polytechnic State University, San Luis Obispo in an attempt to rescue a cow. Rosenberg and a 31-year-old woman were arrested by university police who later issued them temporary stay-away orders. Rosenberg's mother was also arrested for allegedly contributing to the delinquency of a minor. No charges were filed by police. Rosenberg organized additional protests against the University aimed to shut down the on-campus slaughterhouse.

At the 2019 College Football Playoff National Championship, Rosenberg at age 16 rushed onto the field at Levi Stadium and unfurled a banner in protest of alleged cruel methods by a concession vendor and stadium meat supplier, Starbird and Petaluma Poultry. She was tackled and dragged off the field and questioned by police.

As of August 2021, Rosenberg was a student at University of California, Berkeley and an investigator for Direct Action Everywhere.

On April 16, 2022, she was arrested for chaining herself to the basketball hoop during an NBA playoff game between the Memphis Grizzlies and Minnesota Timberwolves. The action was done to protest the Timberwolves' owner Glen Taylor's farm that "roasted birds alive" by a controversial mass kill method called "ventilation shutdown plus."

Dubbed "Chain Girl" by national media sources, Rosenberg was held overnight and then was released on bond. Her charges were dismissed in January 2023. Candace Buckner, a Washington Post sports columnist and critic, called Rosenberg's ease in accessing the court during a playoff game an example of white privilege.

=== Chickens case ===
Rosenberg was arrested on burglary and theft charges in November 2023 for a June incident where she rescued four chickens from a Perdue Farms Petaluma Poultry plant in Sonoma County, California on behalf of Direct Action Everywhere. DxE claimed that alleged animal abuse from Petaluma Poultry was reported, but Rosenberg decided to take the chickens due to perceived inaction from law enforcement. In 2023, Rosenberg and other members of the animal welfare group Direct Action Everywhere entered a Petaluma Poultry slaughterhouse disguised as workers in the agricultural region of Sonoma county, just north of San Francisco. Rosenberg and her fellow activists removed four chickens from the slaughterhouse – which they later named Poppy, Ivy, Aster and Azalea – and placed them in an animal sanctuary. She and the other members of DxE posted footage of the action online. She was subsequently arrested. Rosenberg did not deny that she had taken the chickens from the Perdue slaughterhouse, but said she was rescuing the birds from a cruel situation.

She pled not guilty, and her trial was scheduled for September 15, 2025. Rosenberg was convicted in 2025 of felony conspiracy and multiple misdemeanors due to the incident. Sonoma County District Attorney's office, that was a part of the prosecuting team, reported that the jury found that Rosenberg conspired with other Direct Action Everywhere members to unlawfully enter the facility of Petaluma Poultry, remove live chickens, steal business records, and interfere with commercial operations. A hearing was held to determine restitution amount owed to Petaluma Poultry. According to the District Attorney's office, the company documented more than $100,000 in losses resulting from the incident. On October 29, 2025, Rosenberg was convicted on two misdemeanor counts of trespassing, a misdemeanor count of tampering with a vehicle, and a felony count to commit conspiracy.

On December 3, she was sentenced to 90 days in jail, with the possibility to spend 60 of the days in alternatives such as house arrest, 2 year's probation, and ordered to pay $100,000 in restitution. She began serving a jail sentence on December 10, 2025. Two weeks later on December 24, Rosenberg was released early from solitary confinement, but was scheduled to begin a sentence of house arrest on January 14, 2026.

== Recognition ==
Rosenberg has been recognized as the youth activist of the year by the Animal Rights National Conference and received a Paul McCartney Veg Advocate Award.

== See also ==
- List of animal rights advocates
