= Privacy Lost =

- Directed by: Peter Stoel, Robert Berger
- Written by: Louis Rosenberg
- Produced by: Louis Rosenberg, Peter Stoel
- Starring: Brian Kant; Michael Krass; Estelle Levinson; Thor van der Linden; Carlijn van Ramshorst
- Cinematography: Robert Berger
- Production companies: Minderoo Pictures, Responsible Metaverse Alliance, XR Guild
- Release date: 2023
- Country: United States
- Language: English

Privacy Lost is a 2023 short science fiction film directed by Peter Stoel and Robert Berger. It follows a family using augmented reality (AR) and artificial intelligence (AI) devices capable of reading emotional states, raising questions about privacy and manipulation.

== Premise ==
Privacy Lost follows a family using AR glasses that capture and interpret emotions in real time. As the parents argue in a restaurant, their emotional states and even hidden feelings become visible through these glasses. An AI-driven waiter adapts its appearance for each family member, employing emotional data to influence their decisions.

== Cast ==
- Brian Kant as Waiter
- Michael Krass as Husband
- Estelle Levinson as Waitress
- Thor van der Linden as Scotty
- Carlijn van Ramshorst as Wife

== Production ==
Filming took place at HeadQ Productions, a virtual studio located in Amsterdam. The creators sought to depict a near-future scenario in which real-time emotion analysis becomes part of daily interactions. The film was screened at the Augmented World Expo (AWE), where it was noted for its thematic focus on AI-driven manipulation and emotional tracking. The depiction of AR glasses and AI characters integrates modern visual effects to show how devices might analyze emotional responses in real time. It also depicts how AI-driven interactions could influence consumer decisions, pointing to concerns over potential misuse.

== Themes ==
Privacy Lost focuses on the intersection of advanced AI capabilities and AR environments, showing how real-time emotional analysis can be leveraged for targeted persuasion. The film aims to highlight the social and ethical implications of emerging AR and AI technologies, underlining how establishing clear regulatory frameworks for them is necessary to protect individual privacy, govern the storage of emotion-based data, and prevent manipulative practices. Critics describe the film’s theme as dystopian and note that such a reality is unlikely to occur in the near future. However, despite the exaggerated scenario, the film emphasizes the importance of a responsible approach by developers toward emerging technologies.

== See also ==
- Augmented reality
- Artificial intelligence
- Metaverse
- Information privacy
- Ethics of technology
