= Immersion Corporation =

American technology company and patent litigator

- Type: Public
- Traded as: Nasdaq: IMMR; Russell 2000 component
- Industry: Technology
- Founded: 1993; 33 years ago
- Founder: Louis Rosenberg
- Headquarters: Aventura, Florida, U.S.
- Key people: Eric Singer (CEO, 2023–) Past CEOs: Francis Jose (CEO, 2021–2022 & CLO); Jared Smith (CEO, 2020–2021); Ramzi Haidamus (CEO, –2020); Victor Viegas (CEO, c. 2014); Louis Rosenberg (CEO, 1993–2000)
- Revenue: ▲US$35.1 million (2021)
- Number of employees: 14 (2023)
- Website: immersion.com

Immersion Corporation is an Aventura, Florida based developer and licensor of touch feedback technology, also known as haptic technology. Immersion Corporation has been accused of being a patent troll. Founded in 1993 by Louis Rosenberg, it is headed by lawyer Francis Jose, who is chief executive officer and general counsel.

== History ==
Immersion Corporation was founded in 1993 by Louis Rosenberg, who was CEO until 2000. The company emerged as a pioneer in haptic technology, which simulates tactile feedback through vibrations or forces. In 1997, Immersion partnered with Microsoft to integrate its TouchSense technology into the DirectInput API for DirectX 5.0, enhancing force feedback capabilities for gaming and input devices. Collaboration between the two companies continued with DirectX 6 and 7, and in 1999, they signed an agreement to share "feel simulation technology," further embedding Immersion’s innovations into Microsoft’s platforms.

In March 1999, the company acquired Cybernet Haptic Systems from Cybernet Systems Corporation, bolstering its patent portfolio through a combination of stock and cash. Later that year, in November, Immersion became a publicly traded company, debuting on the Nasdaq at $12.00 per share. In 2000 were three key acquisitions: Haptic Technologies ($7 million) and Immersion Medical (undisclosed amount) in March, followed by Virtual Technologies ($1 million) in September.

By 2014, the company had amassed over 1,650 issued or pending patents worldwide related to haptic technology. In February 2016, it accused Apple of infringing two patents in the iPhone 6s and Apple Watch, with CEO Victor Viegas seeking damages and a U.S. sales injunction. In January 2017, Immersion entered a multi-year licensing agreement with Nintendo, enabling the use of its haptic technology in the Nintendo Switch’s HD Rumble feature.

== Litigation ==
=== Sony and Microsoft ===
In 2002, Immersion filed a suit against Microsoft and Sony alleging that their game console controllers were infringing on two of Immersion's patents, which were extensions of US Patent 6,088,017, itself filed 1998 by Virtual Technologies Inc which Immersion later acquired; both defendants eventually reached agreements with Immersion that involved multimillion-dollar payments.

=== Meta Platforms ===
In May 2022, Immersion sued Meta Platforms for patent infringement relating to the use of vibration functions in their gaming controllers.

=== Valve ===
In May 2023, Immersion sued Valve Corporation for patent infringement relating to the use of vibration functions in their Steam Deck and Valve Index gaming hardware.
