= Game controller =

Device used with games or entertainment systems

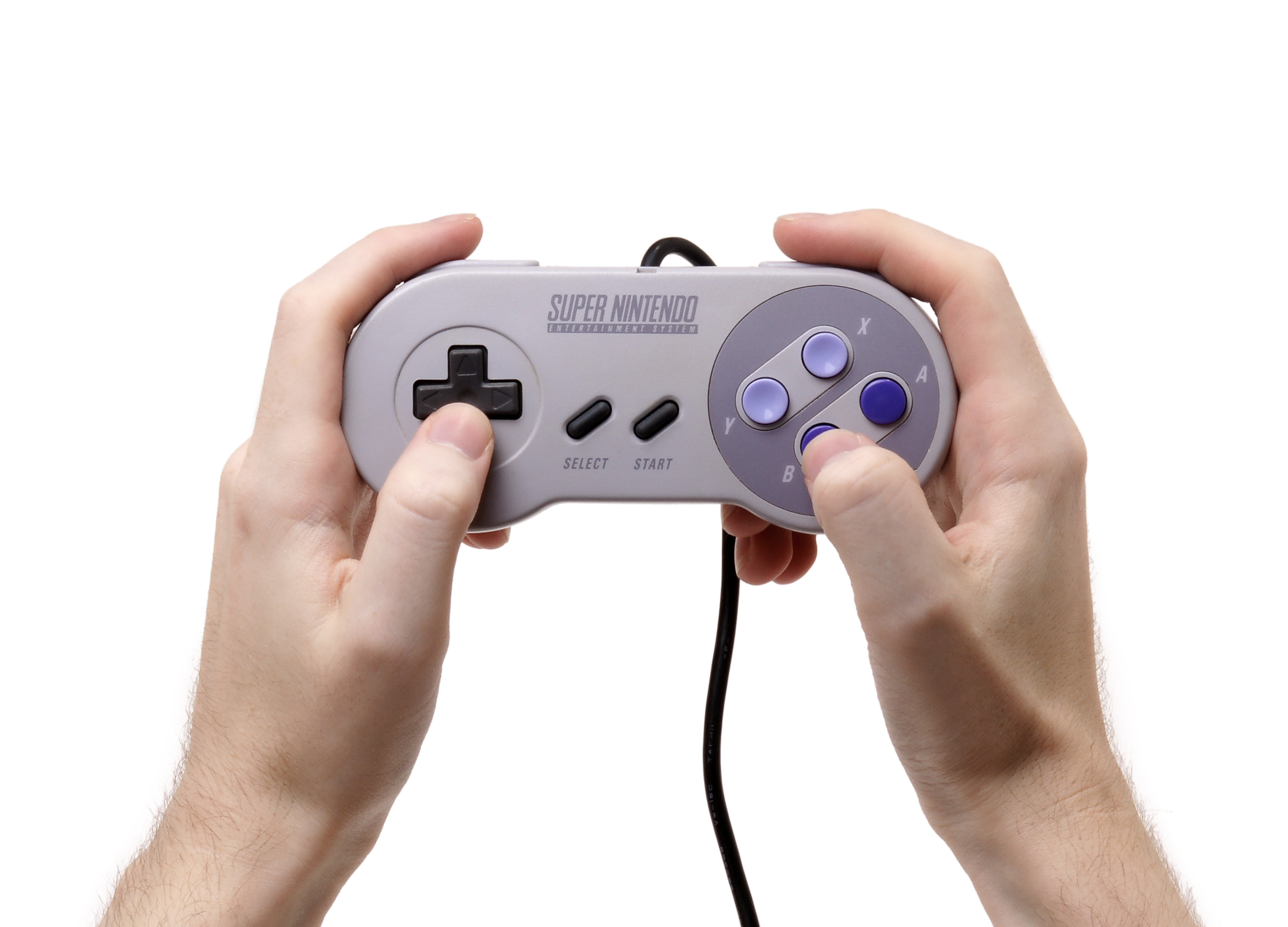
A North American Super Nintendo Entertainment System controller, following a conventional gamepad layout

A game controller, gaming controller, or simply controller, is an input device or input/output device used with video games or entertainment systems to provide input to a video game. Input devices that have been classified as game controllers include keyboards, mice, gamepads, and joysticks, as well as special purpose devices, such as steering wheels for driving games and light guns for shooting games. Controllers designs have evolved to include directional pads, multiple buttons, analog sticks, joysticks, motion detection, touch screens and a plethora of other features.

Game controllers may be input devices that only provide input to the system, or input/output devices that receive data from the system and produce a response (e.g. "rumble" vibration feedback, or sound).

Controllers which are included with the purchase of a home console are referred to as standard controllers, while those that are available to purchase from the console manufacturer or third-party offerings are considered peripheral controllers.

== History ==
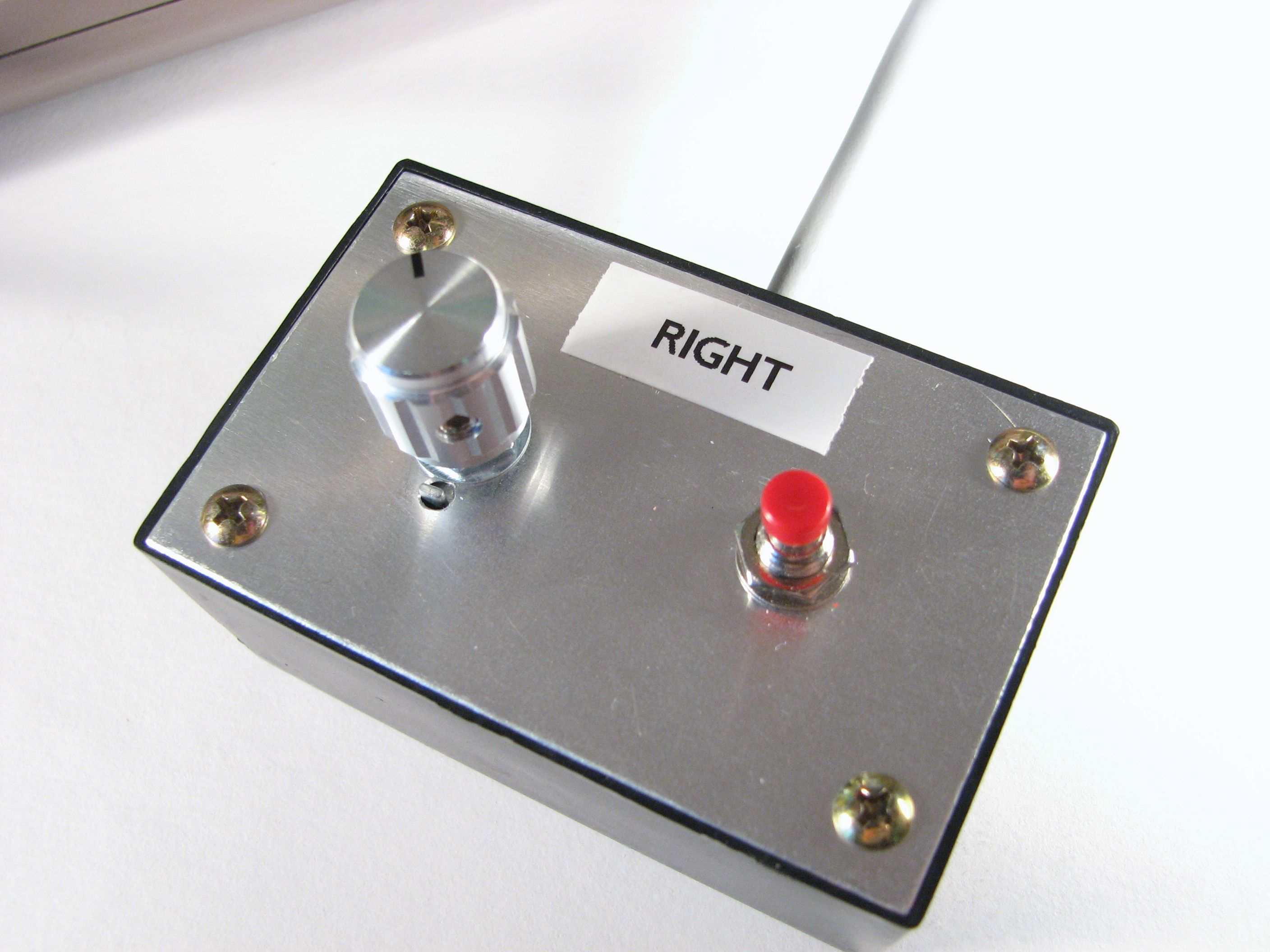
A modern recreation of the controller for the 1958 video game Tennis for Two

One of the first video game controllers was a simple dial and single button, used to control the game Tennis for Two. Controllers have since evolved to include directional pads, multiple buttons, analog sticks, joysticks, motion detection, touch screens and a plethora of other features.

Game controllers have been designed and improved over the years to be as user friendly as possible. The Microsoft Xbox controller, with its shoulder triggers that mimic actual triggers such as those found on guns, has become popular for shooting games.

Before the seventh generation of video game consoles, plugging in a controller into one of a console's controller ports was the primary means of using a game controller, although since then they have been replaced by wireless controllers, which do not require controller ports on the console but are battery-powered. USB game controllers could also be connected to a computer with a USB port.

== Variants ==
Input devices that have been classified as game controllers include keyboards, mouses, gamepads, and joysticks. Special purpose devices, such as steering wheels for driving games and light guns for shooting games, are also game controllers. Some controllers are designed to be best for one type of game, such as steering wheels for driving games, or dance pads for dancing games.

=== Gamepad ===
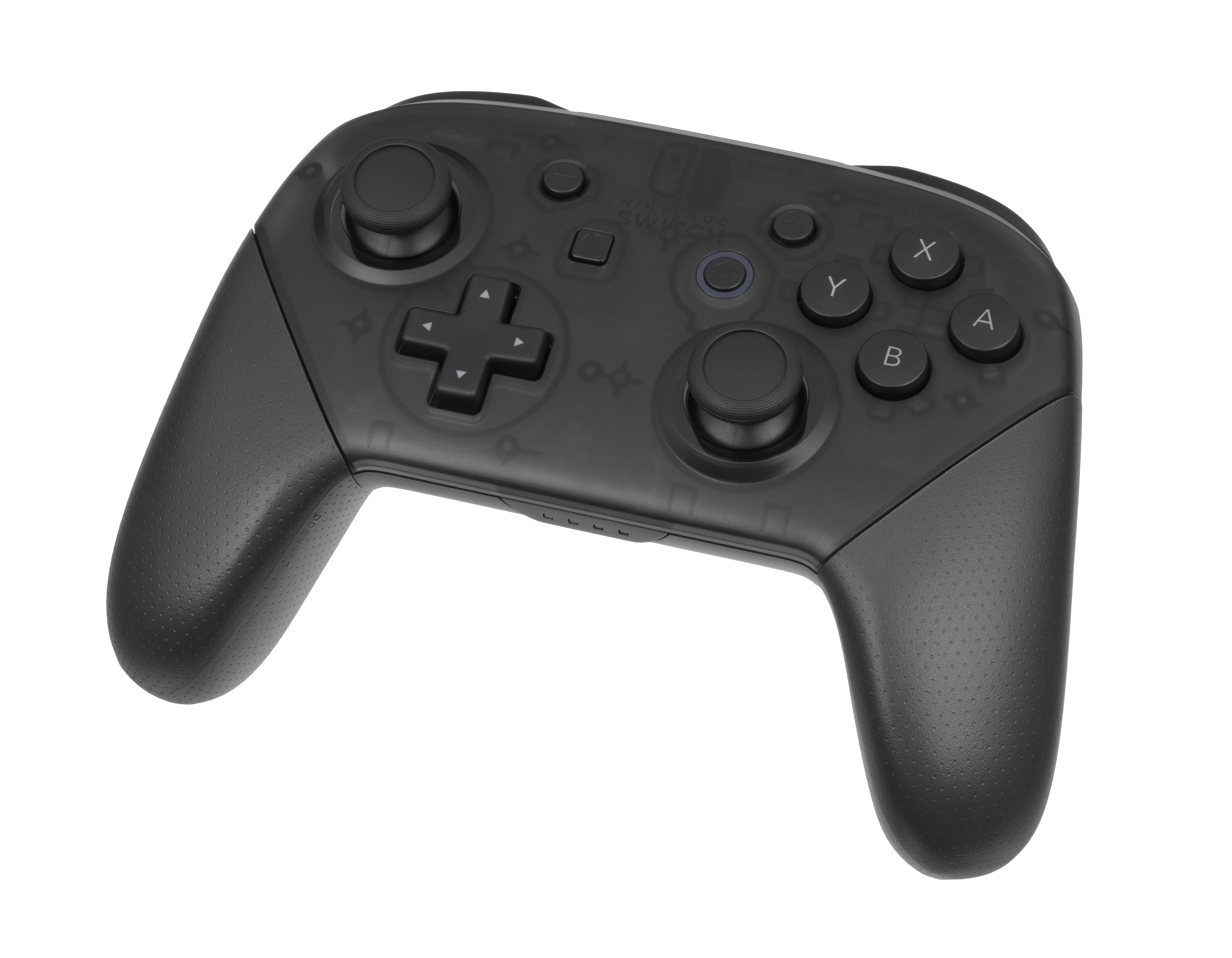
A Nintendo Switch Pro Controller, a typical modern two-stick gamepad

A gamepad, also known as a joypad, is held in both hands with thumbs and fingers used to provide input. Gamepads can have a number of action buttons combined with one or more omnidirectional control sticks or buttons. Action buttons are generally handled with the digits on the right hand, and the directional input handled with the left. Gamepads are the primary means of input on most modern video game consoles. Due to the ease of use and user-friendly nature of gamepads, they have spread from their origin on traditional consoles to personal computers, where a variety of games and emulators support their input as a replacement for keyboard and mouse input. Most modern game controllers are a variation of a standard gamepad. Common additions include shoulder buttons placed along the edges of the pad, centrally placed buttons labeled start, select, and mode, and an internal motor to provide haptic feedback.

As modern game controllers advance, so too do their user ability qualities. Typically, the controllers become smaller and more compact to more easily, and comfortably, fit within the user's hand. Modern examples can be drawn from systems such as the first Xbox console, whose controller has changed in a variety of ways from the original Xbox 360 controller to the Xbox One controller introduced in 2013.

=== Paddle ===
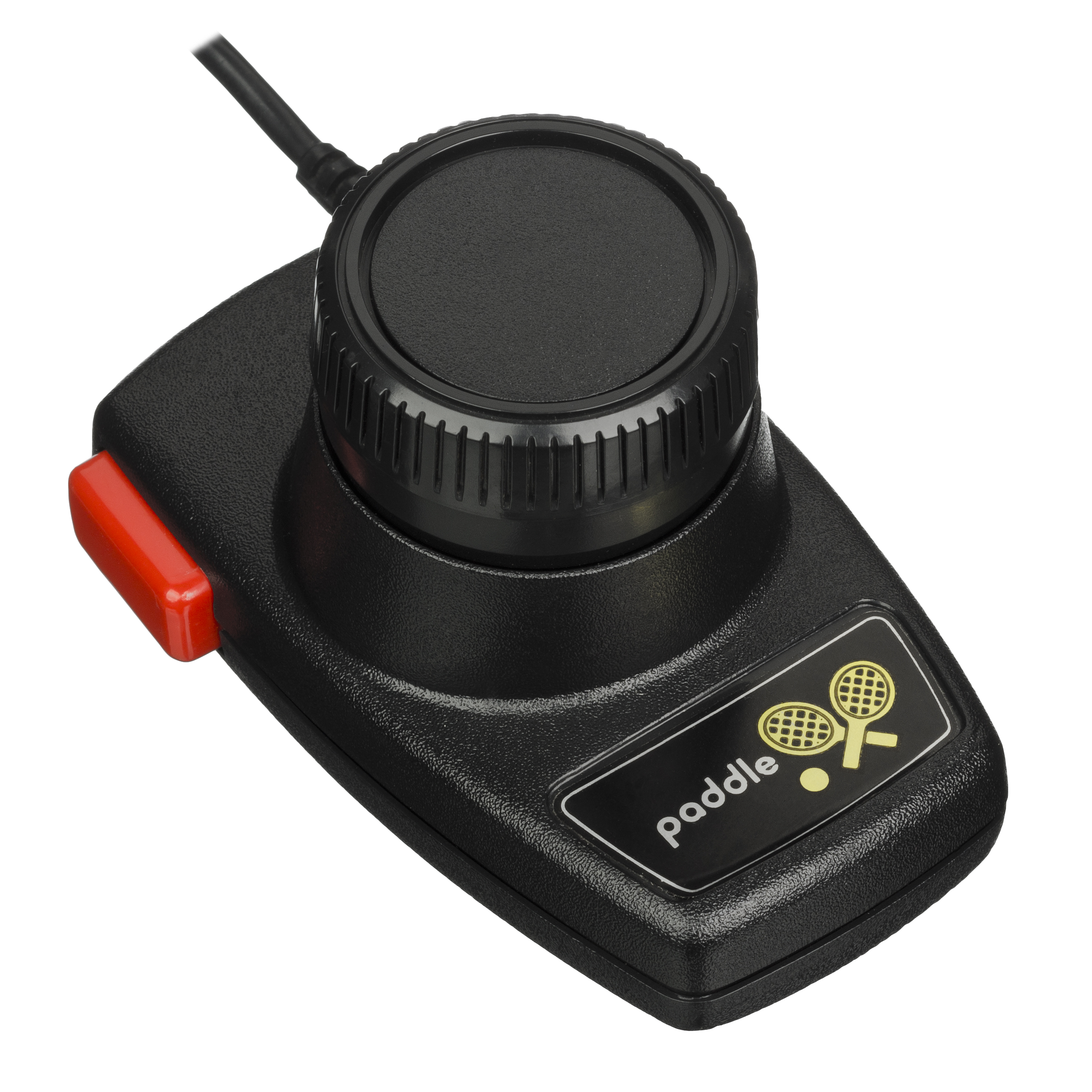
Paddle controllers were popular early in the 2nd console generation for Pong games.

A paddle is a controller that features a round wheel and one or more fire buttons. The wheel is typically used to control movement of the player or of an object along one axis of the video screen. As the user turns the wheel further from the default position, the speed of control in the game become more intensive.

Paddle controllers were the first analog controllers and they lost popularity when "paddle and ball" type games fell out of favor. A variation, the Atari driving controller, appeared on the Atari 2600. Designed specifically for the game Indy 500, it functioned almost identically in operation and design to the regular paddle controller. The exceptions were that its wheel could be continuously rotated in either direction, and that it was missing the extra paddle included on the previous model. Unlike a spinner, friction prevented the wheel from gaining momentum.

=== Joystick ===
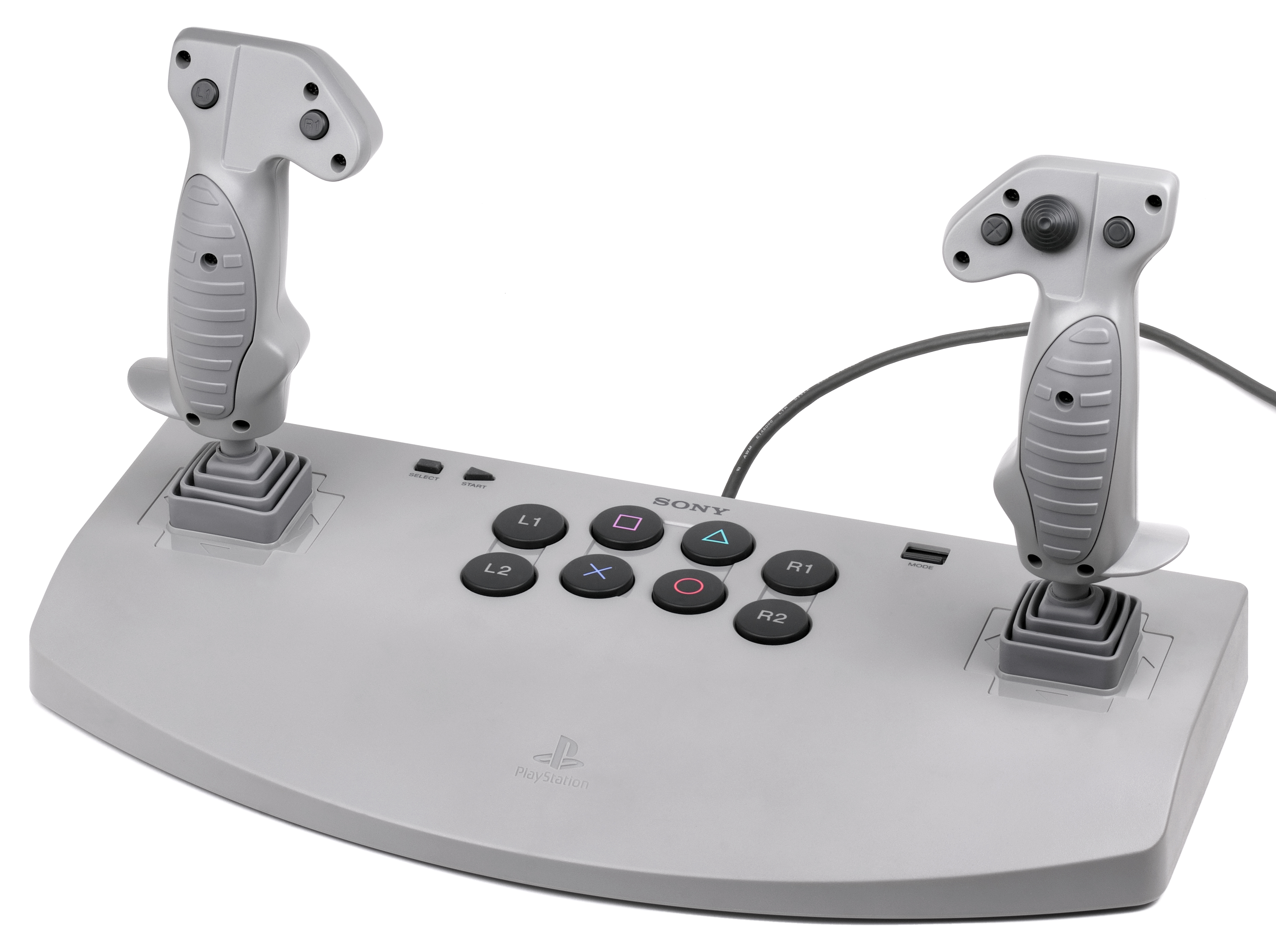
A dual-joystick controller for the original PlayStation

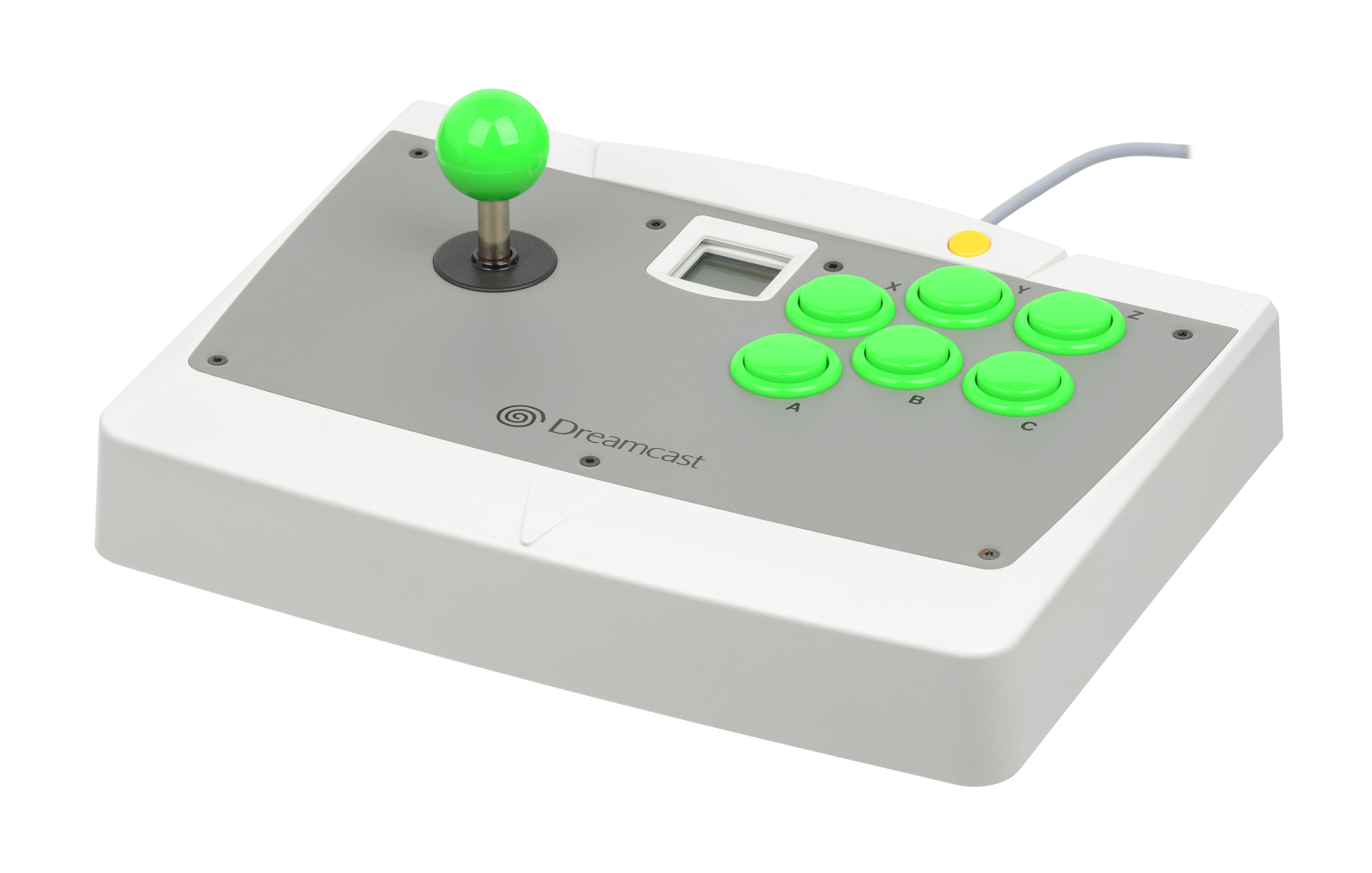
An arcade style controller for the Sega Dreamcast

A joystick is a peripheral that consists of a handheld stick that can be tilted around either of two axes and (sometimes) twisted around a third. The joystick is often used for flight simulators. HOTAS (hands on throttle and stick) controllers, composed of a joystick and throttle quadrant (see below) are a popular combination for flight simulation among its most fanatic devotees.

Most joysticks are designed to be operated with the user's primary hand (e.g. with the right hand of a right-handed person), with the base either held in the opposite hand or mounted on a desk. Arcade controllers are typically joysticks featuring a shaft that has a ball or drop-shaped handle, and one or more buttons for in game actions. Generally the layout has the joystick on the left, and the buttons on the right, although there are instances when this is reversed.

=== Trackball ===
A trackball is a smooth sphere that is manipulated with the palm of one's hand. The user can roll the ball in any direction to control the cursor. It has the advantage that it can be faster than a mouse depending on the speed of rotation of the physical ball. Another advantage is that it requires less space than a mouse, which the trackball was a precursor of. Notable uses of a Trackball as a gaming controller would be games such as Centipede, Marble Madness, Golden Tee Golf and SegaSonic the Hedgehog.

=== Throttle quadrant ===
A throttle quadrant is a set of one or more throttle levers that are most often used to simulate throttles or other similar controls in a real vehicle, particularly an aircraft. Throttle quadrants are most popular in conjunction with joysticks or yokes used in flight simulation.

=== Steering wheel ===
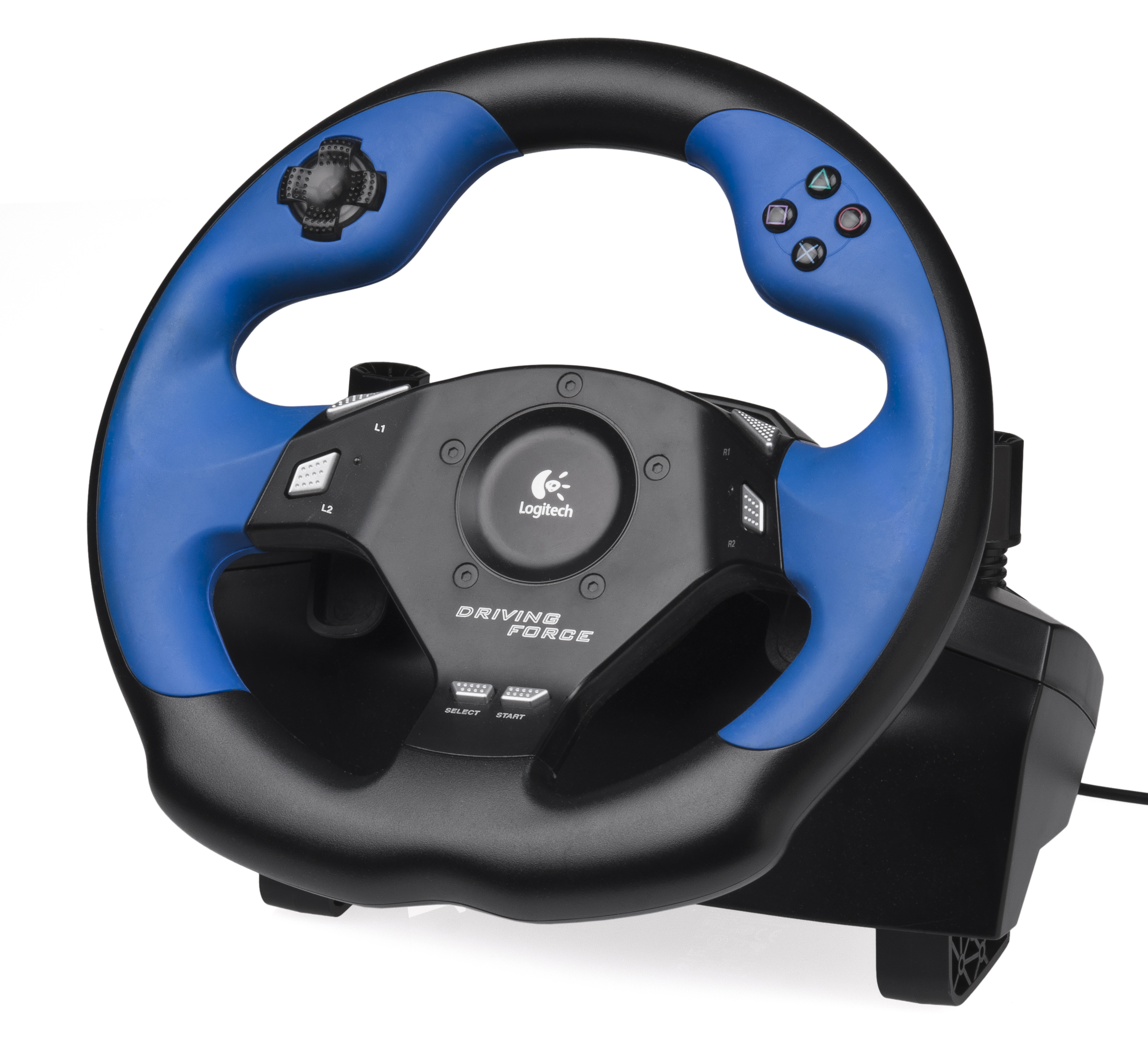
A Logitech steering wheel for the PlayStation 2

A racing wheel, essentially a larger version of a paddle, is used in most racing arcade games as well as more recent racing simulators such as Live for Speed, Grand Prix Legends, GTR2, and Richard Burns Rally. While most arcade racing games have been using steering wheels since Gran Trak 10 in 1974, steering wheels for home systems appeared on fifth-generation consoles such as the PlayStation and Nintendo 64. Many are force feedback (see Force Feedback Wheel), designed to give the same feedback as would be experienced when driving a real car, but the realism of this depends on the game. They usually come with pedals to control the gas and brake. Shifting is taken care of in various ways including paddle shifting systems, simple stick shifters which are moved forward or back to change gears or more complex shifters which mimic those of real vehicles, which may also use a clutch. Some wheels turn only 200 to 270 degrees lock-to-lock but higher-tier models can turn 900 degrees, or 2.5 turns, lock-to-lock, or more. The Namco Jogcon paddle was available for the PlayStation game R4: Ridge Racer Type 4. Unlike "real" video game steering wheels, the Jogcon was designed to fit in the player's hand. Its much smaller wheel (diameter roughly similar to a soda can's) resembles the jog-and-shuttle control wheel used on some VCRs. The Wii game Mario Kart Wii is bundled with the Wii Wheel: a steering wheel-shaped shell that the Wii Remote is placed inside thus using the Wii Remote's motion sensing capabilities to control the kart during the game. Hori also has a steering wheel that is made for the Nintendo 3DS game Mario Kart 7. When the steering wheel is placed on the back of the console, then it will have the same ability as in Mario Kart Wii by using the gyroscope in first-person mode.

=== Yoke ===
A yoke is very similar to a steering wheel except that it resembles the control yoke found on many aircraft and has two axes of movement: not only rotational movement about the shaft of the yoke, but also a forward-and-backward axis equivalent to that of pitch control on the yoke of an aircraft. Some yokes have additional controls attached directly to the yoke for simulation of aircraft functions such as radio push-to-talk buttons. Some flight simulator sets that include yokes also come with various other aircraft controls such as throttle quadrants and pedals. These sets, including the yoke, are intended to be used in a flight simulator.

=== Pedals ===
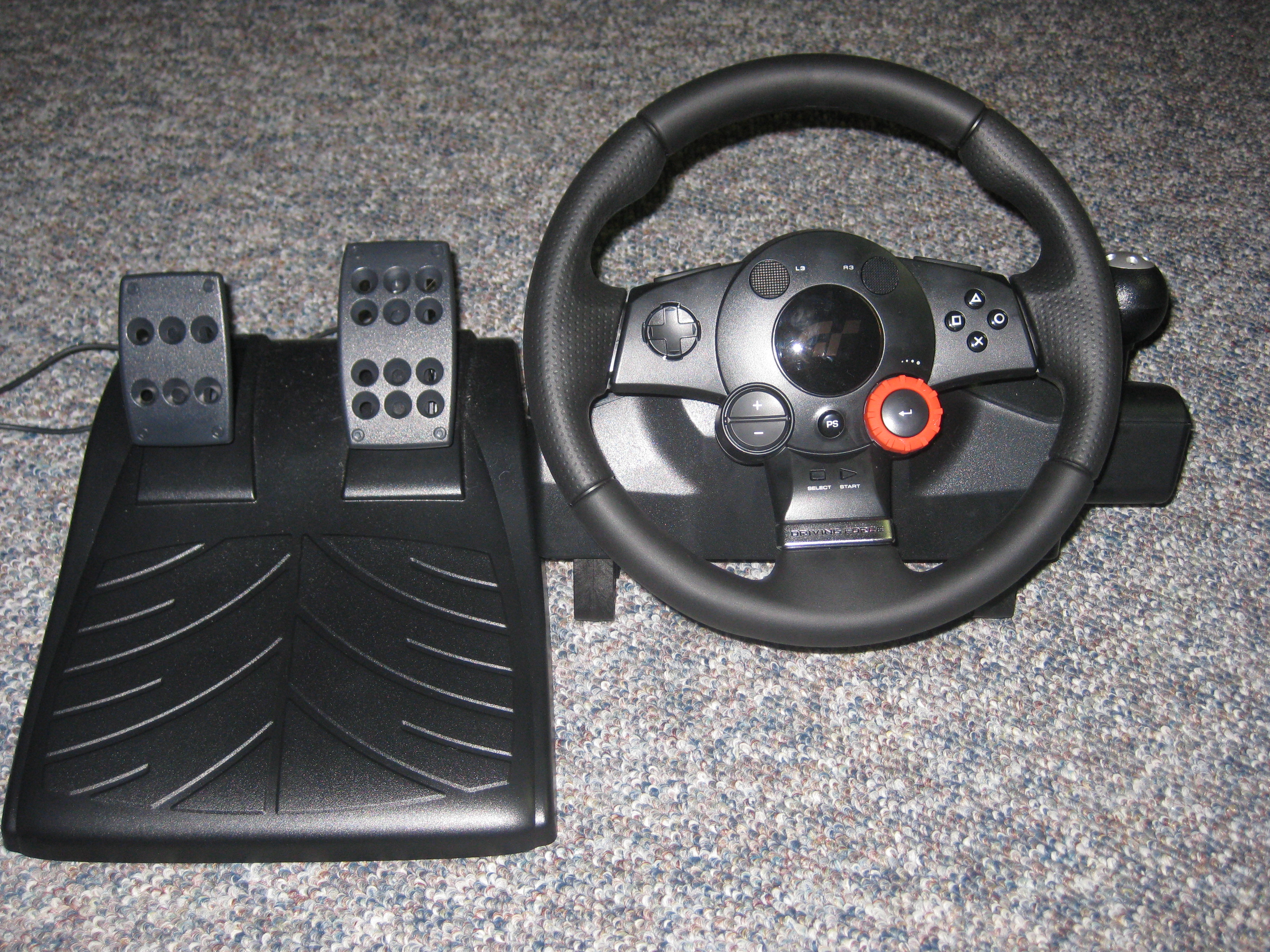
A Logitech Driving Force GT combo of a sim steering wheel and pedals (2011)

Pedals may be used for driving simulations or flight simulations and often ships with a steering-wheel-type input device. In the former case, an asymmetric set of pedals can simulate accelerator, brake, and clutch pedals in a real automobile. In the latter case, a symmetric set of pedals simulates rudder controls and toe brakes in an aircraft. As mentioned, most steering wheel controllers come with a set of pedals. There are also variations of the pedal controller such as the proposed rotating pedal device for a cycling game, which relies on an ergometer to generate user inputs such as pedal rpm and pedal resistance. A variation of this concept surfaced in 2016 when a startup called VirZoom debuted a set of sensors that can be installed in the pedal and handlebars, turning a physical bike into one controller for games on the HTC Vive and Oculus Rift virtual reality (VR) platforms. The same concept is behind a product called Cyber ExerCycle, which is a set of sensors attached to the pedal and connected to the PC via USB for bicycle simulation games such as NetAthlon and Fuel.

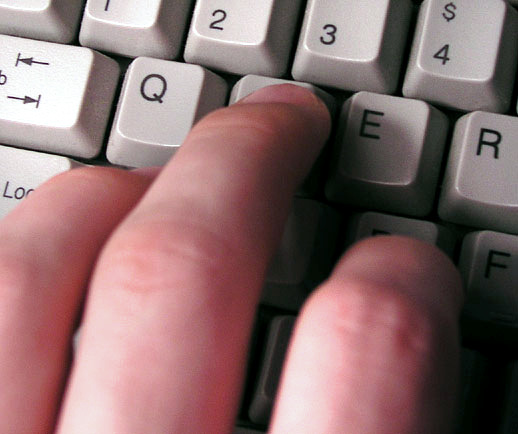
The WASD keyboard setup is used widely, but by no means universally.

=== Mouse and keyboard ===
A mouse and computer keyboard are typical input devices for a personal computer and are currently the main game controllers for computer games. The mouse is often used with a mousepad to achieve greater speed, comfort, accuracy and smoother movement for the gamer. Some video game consoles also have the ability to function with a keyboard and a mouse. The computer keyboard is modelled after the typewriter keyboard and was designed for the input of written text. A mouse is a handheld pointing device used in addition to the keyboard. For games, the keyboard typically controls movement of the character while the mouse is used to control the game camera or used for aiming. While originally designed for general computer input, there are several keyboard and mouse peripherals available which are designed specifically for gaming, often with gaming-specific functions built-in. Examples include peripherals by Razer, the "Zboard" range of keyboards and Logitech's 'G' series. The numeric keypad found on the keyboard is also used as a game controller and can be found on a number of separate devices, most notably early consoles, usually attached to a joystick or a paddle. The keypad is a small grid of keys with at least the digits 0–9. A gaming keypad is a specialized controller used for FPSs, RTSs and some arcade type games. These controllers can be programmed to allow the emulation of keys, and macros in some cases. These generally resemble a small part of a keyboard but may also feature other inputs such as analog sticks. In 2007, peripheral developer Jason O. Johnson, head of Split Fish Gameware, introduced a first of its kind design, Dual Mouse/Motion Nunchuck, two part Combo controller, for PlayStation 2 called "FragFx" to improve accuracy of FPS gaming on consoles and emulate the feel of a mouse and keyboard input similar to PC gaming. They were developed because some of these games require a keyboard to play, and some players find this to be awkward for such a task. The mouse and keyboard input is also known by the abbreviation "MnK".

=== Touchscreen ===
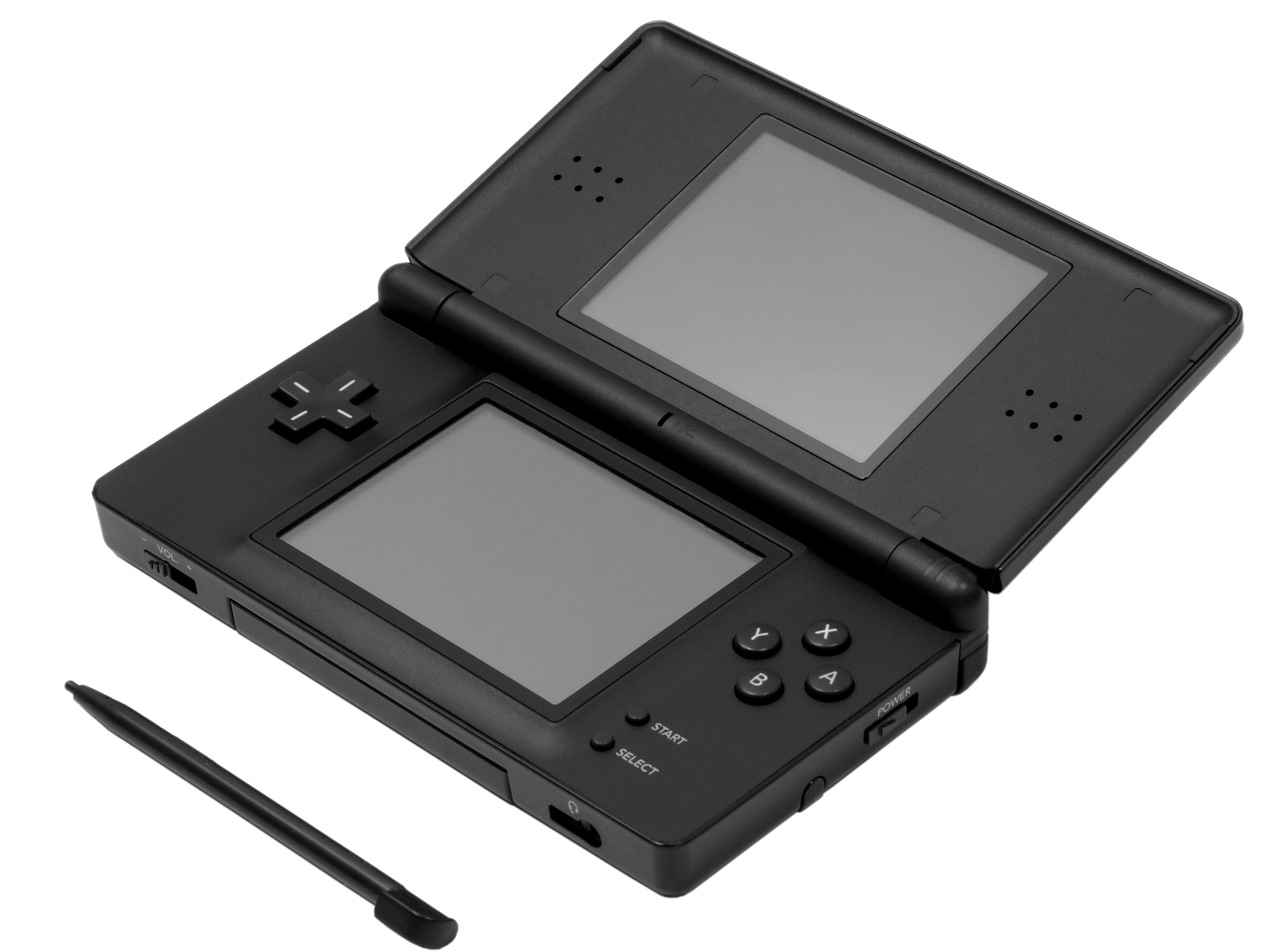
Nintendo DS touchscreen (bottom) with stylus

A touchscreen is an input device that allows the user to interact with the computer by touching the display screen. The first attempt at a handheld game console with touchscreen controls was Sega's intended successor to the Game Gear, though the device was ultimately shelved and never released due to the high cost of touchscreen technology in the early 1990s. The first released console to use a touchscreen was the Tiger game.com in 1997. Nintendo popularized it for use in video games with the Nintendo DS and Nintendo 3DS; other systems including the Tapwave Zodiac as well as Smartphones and the vast majority of PDAs have also included this feature. The primary controller for Nintendo's Wii U console, the Wii U GamePad, features an embedded touchscreen. Modern touch screens use a thin, durable, transparent plastic sheet overlaid onto a glass screen. The location of a touch is calculated from the capacitance for the X and Y axes, which varies based upon where the sheet is touched. One console that is touchscreen developed by Sony is the PlayStation Vita which has a 5-inch OLED touchscreen. The Nintendo Switch features a 6.2 inch touchscreen, whereas its successor, the Nintendo Switch 2 features a 7.9 inch touchscreen.

=== Motion sensing ===
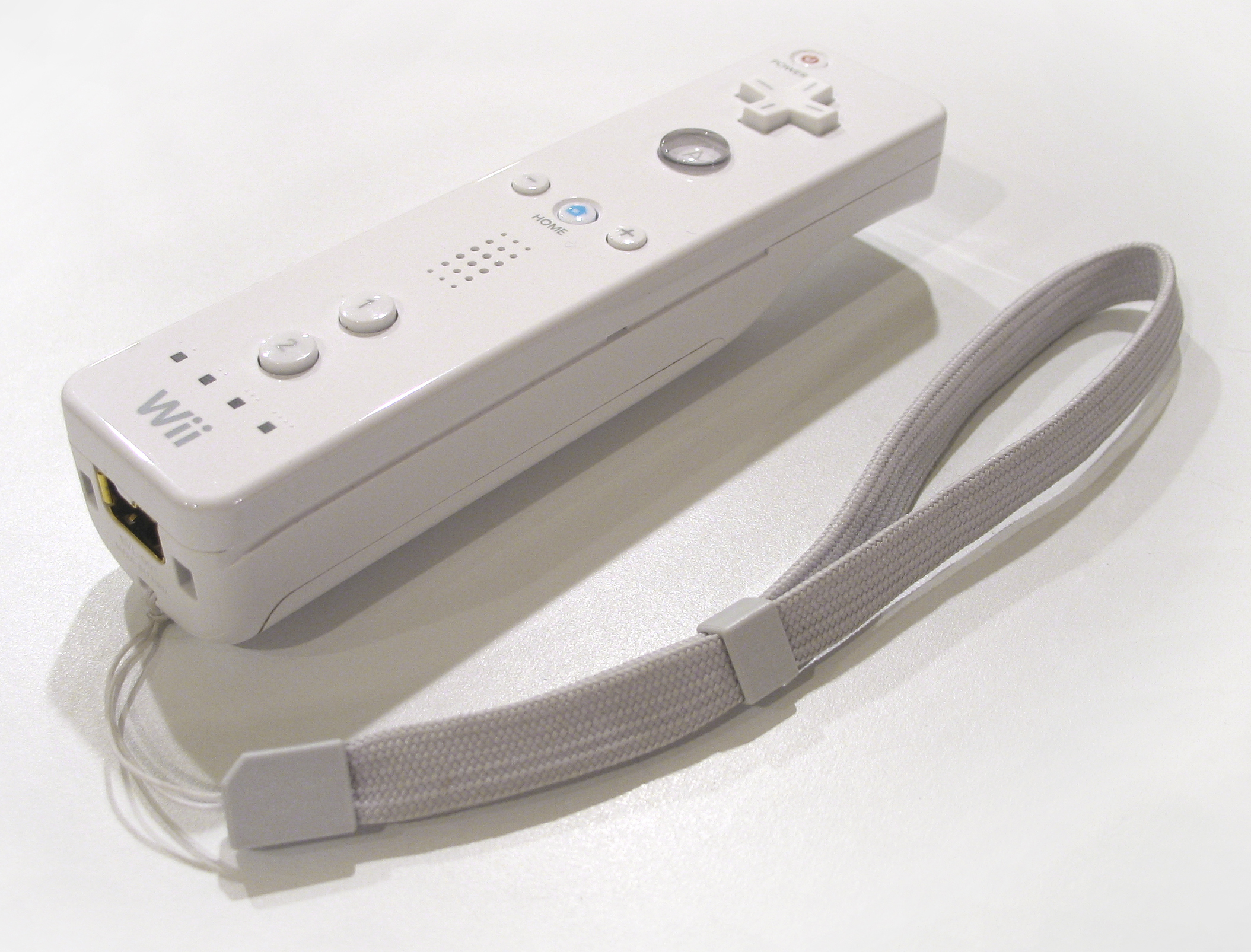
Wii Remote

Motion controllers include the Sega Activator, released in 1993 for the Mega Drive (Genesis). Based on the Light Harp invented by Assaf Gurner, it could read the player's physical movements and was the first controller to allow full-body motion sensing. However, it was a commercial failure due to its "unwieldiness and inaccuracy". Nintendo's Wii system released in 2006 utilizes the Wii Remote controller, which uses accelerometers to detect its approximate orientation and acceleration and an image sensor, so it can be used as a pointing device. The Sixaxis, DualShock 3, and PlayStation Move controllers for Sony's PlayStation 3 system have similar motion sensing capabilities. In 2007, peripheral developer Jason O. Johnson, head of Split Fish Gameware, introduced a first of its kind, Dual Mouse/Motion Nunchuck Combo controller for PlayStation 2 called "FragFx" to improve accuracy of FPS gaming on consoles. In 2010, Microsoft released the Kinect for the Xbox 360. This motion sensing controller uses cameras to track a player's movement. Microsoft released a revised version of the Kinect with the launch of the Xbox One. This controller was bundled with the console on launch, and was removed from the default bundle in June 2014. Sony's EyeToy similarly uses cameras to detect the player's motions and translate them into inputs for the game. Controllers with gyroscopes may be used to create a pointer without a camera; for example the Joy-Con and Nintendo Switch Pro Controller are used for this in games such as ports of World of Goo and Super Mario Galaxy from the Wii.

=== Adaptive controllers ===
An adaptive controller is collections of various input methods that can be combined in multiple ways to create a controller that works for the user. The adaptive controller was designed for people with physical disabilities that would prevent them from using a gamepad or mouse and keyboard. An example would be PlayStation's access controller that was released in December 2023 which allows for a large joystick, eight buttons on a circular pad, and four ports to plug in additional buttons or accessories. Xbox and Logitech have collaborated to make an adaptive controller with two large touch pads, a D-pad, three buttons, and 16 ports to plug in additional accessories. These accessories can include joysticks, pedals, triggers and buttons.

=== Light gun ===
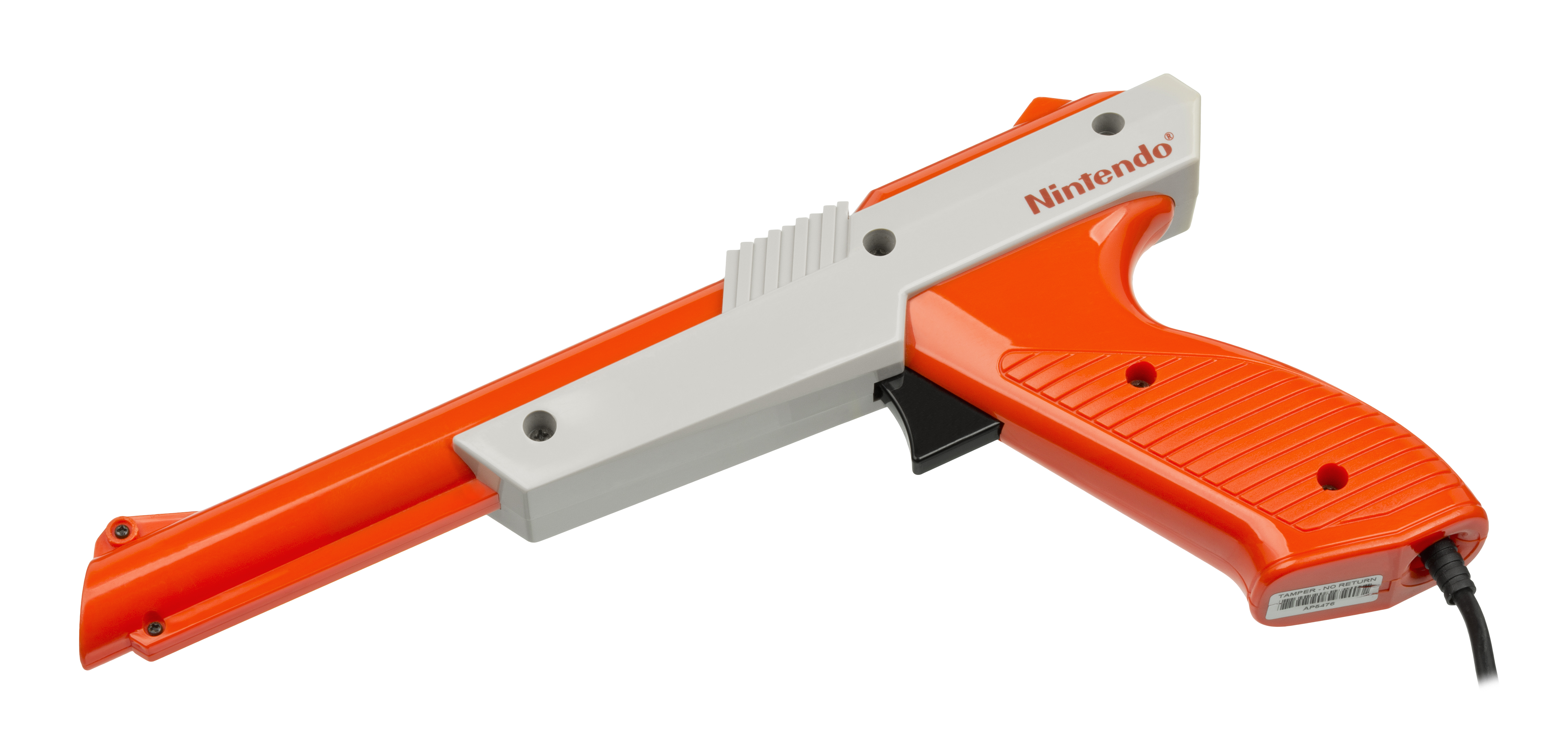
NES Zapper

A light gun is a peripheral used to "shoot" targets on a screen. They usually roughly resemble firearms or ray guns. Their use is normally limited to rail shooters, or shooting gallery games like Duck Hunt and those which came with the Shooting Gallery light gun. A rare example of a non-rail first person shooter game is Taito's 1992 video game Gun Buster, a first-person shooter that used a joystick to move and a light gun to aim. Though light guns have been used in earlier arcade games such as Sega's Periscope in 1966 and Missile in 1969, the first home console light gun was released for the Magnavox Odyssey in 1972; later on, Nintendo would include one standard on their Famicom and NES, called the NES Zapper. Nintendo has also released a "shell" in the style of a light gun for the more recent Wii Remote called the Wii Zapper which comes bundled with the game Link's Crossbow Training.

=== Rhythm game controllers ===
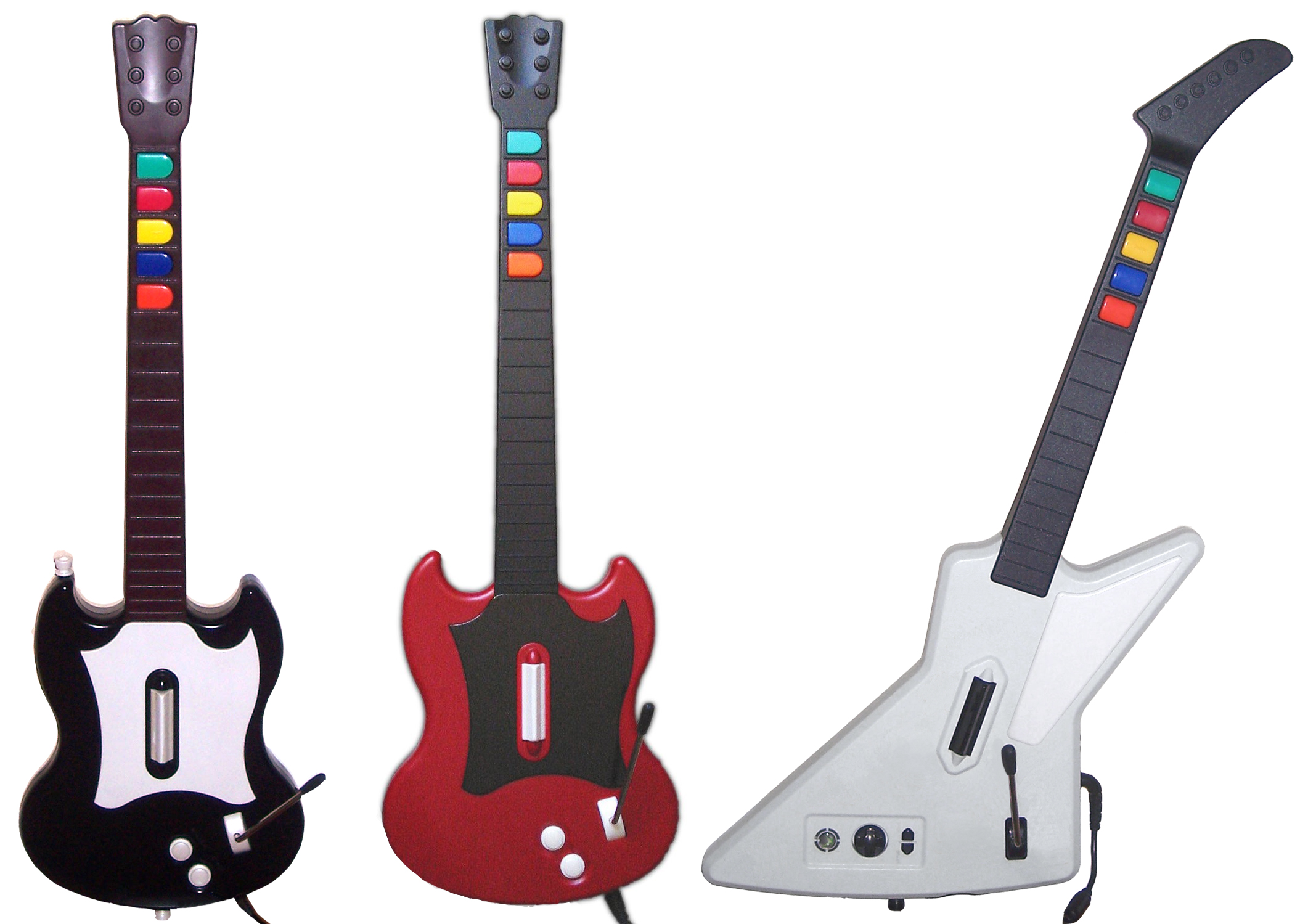
Guitar controllers

Rhythm game accessories used for rhythm games can resemble musical instruments, such as guitars (from multi-button guitars in Guitar Freaks, the Guitar Hero series, and the Rock Band series to real guitars in Rock Band 3 and Rocksmith), keyboards (Rock Band 3), drums (Donkey Konga, Drum Mania, the Rock Band series and the Guitar Hero series), or maracas (Samba de Amigo) have also seen some success in arcades and home consoles. Other rhythm games are based around the art of Djing or turntablism (DJ Hero), or playing a synthesizer (IIDX) using a turntable shaped peripheral with buttons.

=== Wireless ===
Wireless versions of many popular controller types (joypads, mice, keyboards) exist, and wireless motion controls are an emerging class for virtual reality.

=== Others ===
- Balance board: The Wii Balance Board comes with the game Wii Fit. This was preceded by decades by the Joyboard, made to plug into an Atari 2600, to play skiing and surfing games.
- Breathing controllers help their users improve breathing through video games. All controllers have sensors that sense users breath, with which user controls video game on computer, tablet or on smartphone. Alvio is a breathing trainer, symptom tracker and mobile game controller. Zenytime promotes deep, rhythmic breathing to trigger short-term rewards of controlled breathing (relaxation, improved oxygenation...). Breathing games by Breathing Labs are based on Pursed lip breathing and are used on iPhone / iPad, Windows, macOS and Android devices.
- Buzzers: A recent example of specialized, while very simple, game controllers, is the four large "buzzers" (round buttons) supplied with the PlayStation 2 and PlayStation 3 quiz show game series Buzz! (2005–present); both game and controllers clearly being inspired by the television show genre. Another example is the "Big Button Pad" supplied with the Xbox 360 quiz show games Scene It? Lights, Camera, Action and Scene It? Box Office Smash (2007–2008).
- Dance pads, essentially a grid of flat pressure-sensitive gamepad buttons set on a mat meant to be stepped on, have seen niche success with the popularity of rhythm games like Dance Dance Revolution and Pump It Up. The dance pad was first introduced by Bandai on the Famicom in 1986 as a part of their "Family Fun Fitness" set, then Exus released the "Foot Craz" pad for the Atari 2600 in 1987. Nintendo purchased the technology from Bandai in 1988 and used it on their "Power Pad", for the Famicom and NES.
- Exoskeleton controllers use exoskeleton technology to provide the player with different responses based on the player's body position, speed of movement, and other sensed data. In addition to audio and visual responses, an exoskeleton controller may provide a controlled resistance to movement and other stimuli to provide realism to the action. This not only lets players feel as if they are actually performing the function, but also helps reinforce the correct muscle pattern for the activity being simulated. The Forcetek XIO is an example of an exoskeleton video game controller.
- Fishing rod: the first fishing rod controller appeared as an accessory for the Dreamcast video console for playing Sega Marine Fishing. Later other games for PlayStation console use also a similar controllers.
- Floating Interactive Display: at least two commercial systems (Heliodisplay and FogScreen) offer interactive "floating interfaces" which display an image projected in mid-air but can be interacted with by finger similar to a touch screen.
- Instrument panels are simulated aircraft instrument panels, either generic or specific to a real aircraft, that are used in place of the keyboard to send commands to a flight simulation program. Some of these are far more expensive than all the rest of a computer system combined. The panels usually only simulate switches, buttons, and controls, rather than output instrument displays.
- Train controls: Other instrument panel like hardware such as train controls have been produced. The "RailDriver" for example is designed to work with Trainz, Microsoft Train Simulator and Kuju Rail Simulator. (as of January 2009) it is limited in ease of use by the lack of a Windows API for some of the software it is designed to work with. A train controller for a Taito bullet train sim has also been made for the Wii console.
- Mechanical motion tracking systems like Gametrak use cables attached to gloves for tracking position of physical elements in three-dimensional space in real time. The Gametrak mechanism contains a retracting cable reel and a small tubular guide arm from which the cable passes out. The guide arm is articulated in a ball joint such that the arm and ball follow the angle at which the cable extends from the mechanism. The distance of the tracked element from the mechanism is determined through components which measure the rotation of the spool drum for the retracting cable reel, and calculating how far the cable is extended.
- Microphone: A few games have made successes in using a headset or microphone as a secondary controller, such as Hey You, Pikachu!, the Rock Band series, the Guitar Hero series, the SingStar series, Tom Clancy's Endwar, Lips, the Mario Party series, and the SOCOM U.S. Navy SEALs series. The use of these microphones allowed players to issue commands to the game, controlling teammates (as in SOCOM) and other AI characters (e.g., Pikachu). The Nintendo DS features a microphone that is built into the system. It has been used for a variety of purposes, including speech recognition (Nintendogs, Brain Age: Train Your Brain in Minutes a Day!), chatting online between and during gameplay sessions (Pokémon Diamond and Pearl), and minigames that require the player to blow or shout into the microphone (Feel the Magic: XY/XX, WarioWare: Touched!, Mario Party DS).
- Mind-controlled headset: As of March 24, 2007 a United States/Australian company called Emotiv Systems began launching a mind-controlled device for video games based on electroencephalography.
- NeGcon: is a unique controller for racing games on the PlayStation. Physically it resembles a gamepad, but its left and right halves twist relative to each other, making it a variation of the paddle controller.
- Optical motion tracking systems such as TrackIR and FreeTrack use a video camera to track an infrared illuminated or emissive headpiece. Small head movements are tracked and then translated into much larger virtual in-game movements, allowing hands-free view control and improved immersiveness.
- PCGamerBike similar to a pair of pedals removed from an exercise bike, then set down in front of a chair & used to precisely control game characters instead.
- Pinball controllers and multi-button consoles for strategy games were released in the past, but their popularity was limited to hardcore fans of the genre.
- R.O.B. (Robotic Operating Buddy) is an accessory for the Nintendo Entertainment System (NES), which allowed players to interact with NES games by controlling the robot. Known in Japan as the Famicom Robot, this short-lived accessory jumpstarted Nintendo's involvement in the western market, though only used for Stack-Up and Gyromite. As a character, R.O.B. appeared in later Nintendo games such as Mario Kart DS and Super Smash Bros. Brawl.
- The Sega Toylet, an interactive urinal, uses urine as a control method; pressure sensors in the bowl translate the flow of urine into on-screen action.
- Steel Battalion for the Xbox was bundled with a full dashboard, with 2 joysticks and over 30 buttons, in an attempt to make it feel like an actual mecha simulator.
- SpaceOrb 360 was a 3D mouse for spatial interaction in 6DOF that e.g. could be used with Descent.

== Use on PCs and other devices ==
Although gamepads are generally developed for use with consoles, they are also often used for PC gaming and mobile gaming. Modern controllers, such as Sony's Sixaxis/DualShock 3/4/DualSense, Nintendo's Switch Pro Controller/Switch 2 Pro Controller and Valve's Steam Controller, support USB and Bluetooth, allowing them to be directly connected to most PCs. Older gamepads can be connected through the use of official or third-party adapters. Controllers typically require the installation of device drivers to be used on contemporary personal computers. The device may be directly supported, or it may require the use of a specialized program which maps controller inputs to mouse and keyboard inputs. Examples of this kind of software include JoyToKey, Xpadder, and antimicro, which is free, open-source, and cross-platform.

Some controllers are specially designed for usage outside of consoles. In this case, support for mapping to different devices is built into the controller itself, such as with the Nostromo SpeedPad n52, which can act as either a keyboard, mouse, or joystick; or with the Samsung Android GamePad and Backbone One/Pro, designed for use with Android mobile phones.

The usage of gamepads over the mouse and keyboard has been referred to as a debate, with players of MMORPGs, RTS games, and first-person shooters tending to prefer the mouse and keyboard due to the wider variety of inputs and the high precision of the mouse when compared to an analog stick. Likewise, players of racing games, fighting games, and action RPGs tend to prefer controllers for their analog inputs and ergonomic button layouts.

== See also ==
- Human interface device
- List of game controllers
