= Steam Controller =

Steam Controller may refer to:

== Computing ==
A game controller by Valve Corporation:

- Steam Controller (2026)
- Steam Controller (1st generation)

== Engineering ==
- Steam turbine governing
  - Centrifugal governor
