= Governor (device) =

Device used to measure and regulate the speed of a machine

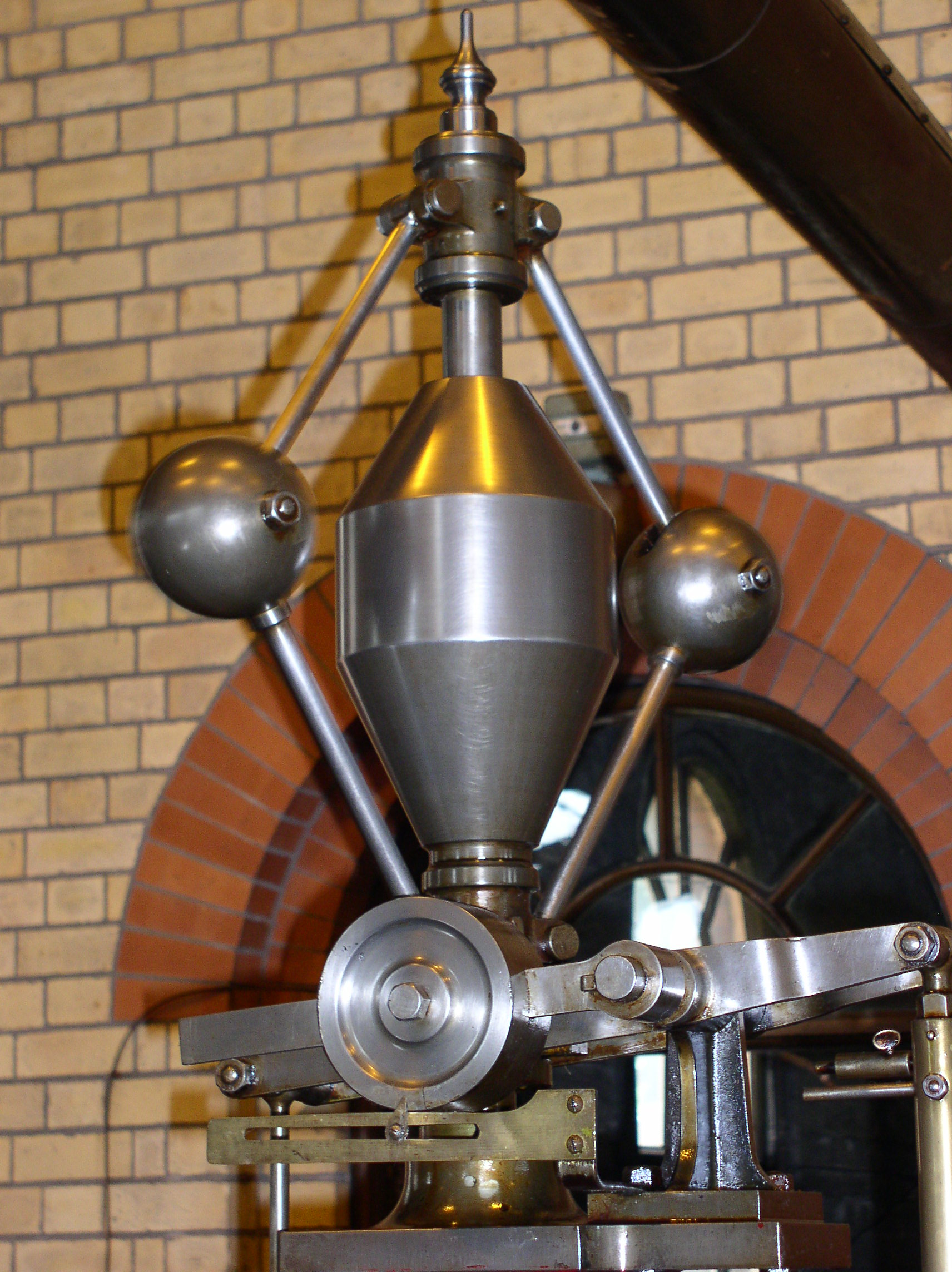
- Porter governor on a Corliss steam engine
- Component type: Switch

Electronic symbol

A governor, or speed limiter or controller, is a device used to measure and regulate the speed of a machine, such as an engine.

A classic example is the centrifugal governor, also known as the Watt or fly-ball governor on a reciprocating steam engine, which uses the effect of inertial force on rotating weights driven by the machine output shaft to regulate its speed by altering the input flow of steam.

== History ==
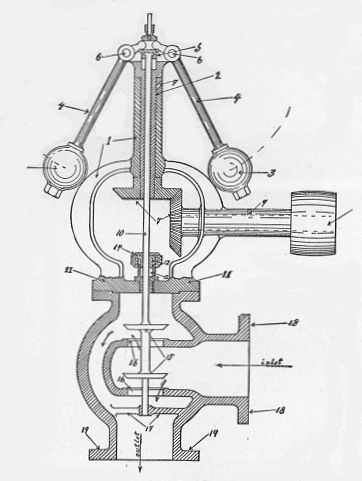
Cut-away drawing of steam engine speed governor. The valve starts fully open at zero speed, and is closed as the balls rotate and rise. The speed sensing drive shaft is top right

Centrifugal governors were used to regulate the distance and pressure between millstones in windmills since the 17th century. Early steam engines employed a purely reciprocating motion, and were used for pumping water – an application that could tolerate variations in the working speed.

It was not until the Scottish engineer James Watt introduced the rotative steam engine, for driving factory machinery, that a constant operating speed became necessary. Between the years 1775 and 1800, Watt, in partnership with industrialist Matthew Boulton, produced some 500 rotative beam engines. At the heart of these engines was Watt's self-designed "conical pendulum" governor: a set of revolving steel balls attached to a vertical spindle by link arms, where the controlling force consists of the weight of the balls.

The theoretical basis for the operation of governors was described by James Clerk Maxwell in 1868 in his seminal paper 'On Governors'.

Building on Watt's design was American engineer Willard Gibbs who in 1872 theoretically analyzed Watt's conical pendulum governor from a mathematical energy balance perspective. During his Graduate school years at Yale University, Gibbs observed that the operation of the device in practice was beset with the disadvantages of sluggishness and a tendency to over-correct for the changes in speed it was supposed to control.

Gibbs theorized that, analogous to the equilibrium of the simple Watt governor (which depends on the balancing of two torques: one due to the weight of the "balls" and the other due to their rotation), thermodynamic equilibrium for any work producing thermodynamic system depends on the balance of two entities. The first is the heat energy supplied to the intermediate substance, and the second is the work energy performed by the intermediate substance. In this case, the intermediate substance is steam.

These sorts of theoretical investigations culminated in the 1876 publication of Gibbs' famous work On the Equilibrium of Heterogeneous Substances and in the construction of the Gibbs’ governor. These formulations are ubiquitous today in the natural sciences in the form of the Gibbs' free energy equation, which is used to determine the equilibrium of chemical reactions; also known as Gibbs equilibrium.

Governors were also to be found on early motor vehicles (such as the 1900 Wilson-Pilcher), where they were an alternative to a hand throttle. They were used to set the required engine speed, and the vehicle's throttle and timing were adjusted by the governor to hold the speed constant, similar to a modern cruise control. Governors were also optional on utility vehicles with engine-driven accessories such as winches or hydraulic pumps (such as Land Rovers), again to keep the engine at the required speed regardless of variations of the load being driven.

== Speed limiters ==
Governors can be used to limit the top speed for vehicles, and for some classes of vehicle such devices are a legal requirement. They can more generally be used to limit the rotational speed of the internal combustion engine or protect the engine from damage due to excessive rotational speed.

=== Cars ===
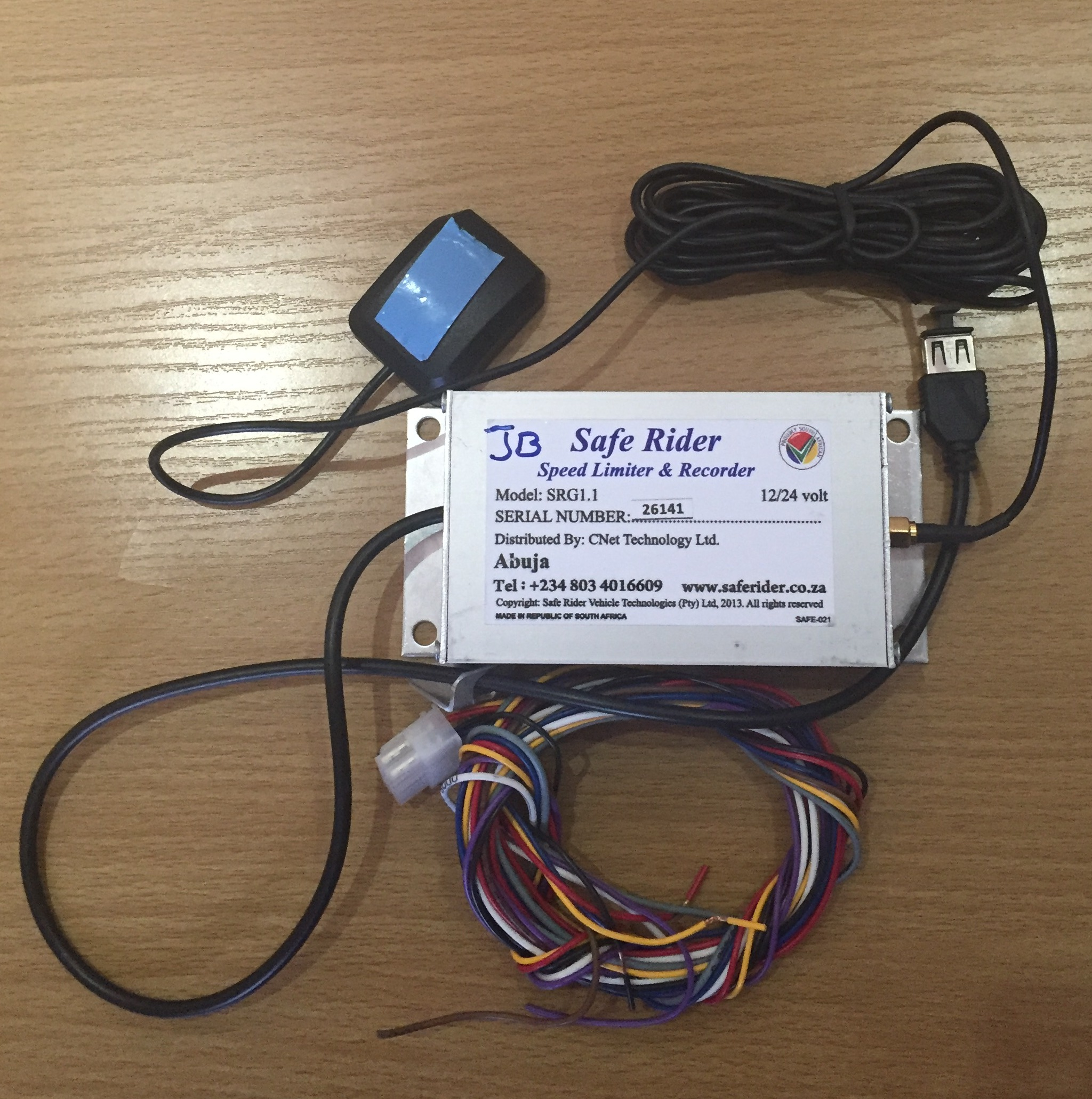
Electronic governor or speed limiter

Today, BMW, Audi, Volkswagen and Mercedes-Benz limit their production cars to 250 km/h (155 mph). Certain Audi Sport GmbH and AMG cars, and the Mercedes/McLaren SLR are exceptions. The BMW Rolls-Royces are limited to 240 km/h (149 mph). Jaguars, although British, also have a limiter, as do the Swedish Saab and Volvo on cars where it is necessary.

German manufacturers initially started the "gentlemen's agreement", electronically limiting their vehicles to a top speed of 250 km/h (155 mph), since such high speeds are more likely on the Autobahn. This was done to reduce the political desire to introduce a legal speed limit.

In European markets, General Motors Europe sometimes choose to discount the agreement, meaning that certain high-powered Opel or Vauxhall cars can exceed the 250 km/h (155 mph) mark, whereas their Cadillacs do not. Ferrari, Lamborghini, Maserati, Porsche, Aston Martin and Bentley also do not limit their cars, at least not to 250 km/h (155 mph). The Chrysler 300C SRT8 is limited to 270 km/h (168 mph). Most Japanese domestic market vehicles are limited to only 180 km/h (112 mph) or 190 km/h (118 mph). The top speed is a strong sales argument, though speeds above about 300 km/h (190 mph) are not likely reachable on public roads.

Some performance cars can be limited to a speed of 250 km/h (155 mph) for reasons such as limiting insurance costs of the vehicle, reducing the risk of tires failing, and abiding by the laws of certain jurisdictions if they wish to sell their models in those areas.

=== Mopeds ===
Mopeds in the United Kingdom have required a 30 mph (48 km/h) speed limiter since 1977. Most other European countries have similar rules (see the main article).

=== Public services vehicles ===
Public service vehicles often have a legislated top speed. Scheduled coach services in the United kingdom (and also bus services) are limited to 65 mph (105 km/h).

Urban public buses often have speed governors which are typically set to between 65 km/h (40 mph) and 100 km/h (62 mph).

=== Trucks ===
All heavy vehicles in Europe and New Zealand have law/by-law governors that limits their speeds to 90 km/h (56 mph) or 100 km/h (62 mph). Fire engines and other emergency vehicles are exempt from this requirement.

== Example uses ==
=== Aircraft ===
Aircraft propellers are another application. The governor senses shaft RPM, and adjusts or controls the angle of the blades to vary the torque load on the engine. Thus as the aircraft speeds up (as in a dive) or slows (in climb) the RPM is held constant.

=== Small engines ===
Small engines, used to power lawn mowers, portable generators, and lawn and garden tractors, are equipped with a governor to limit fuel to the engine to a maximum safe speed when unloaded and to maintain a relatively constant speed despite changes in loading. In the case of generator applications, the engine speed must be closely controlled so the output frequency of the generator will remain reasonably constant.

Small engine governors are typically one of three types:

- Pneumatic: the governor mechanism detects air flow from the flywheel blower used to cool an air-cooled engine. The typical design includes an air vane mounted inside the engine's blower housing and linked to the carburetor's throttle shaft. A spring pulls the throttle open and, as the engine gains speed, increased air flow from the blower forces the vane back against the spring, partially closing the throttle. Eventually, a point of equilibrium will be reached and the engine will run at a relatively constant speed. Pneumatic governors are simple in design and inexpensive to produce. They do not regulate engine speed very accurately and are affected by air density, as well as external conditions that may influence airflow.
- Centrifugal: a flyweight mechanism driven by the engine is linked to the throttle and works against a spring in a fashion similar to that of the pneumatic governor, resulting in essentially identical operation. A centrifugal governor is more complex to design and produce than a pneumatic governor. The centrifugal design is more sensitive to speed changes and hence is better suited to engines that experience large fluctuations in loading.
- Electronic: a servo motor is linked to the throttle and controlled by an electronic module that senses engine speed by counting electrical pulses emitted by the ignition system or a magnetic pickup. The frequency of these pulses varies directly with engine speed, allowing the control module to apply a proportional voltage to the servo to regulate engine speed. Due to their sensitivity and rapid response to speed changes, electronic governors are often fitted to engine-driven generators designed to power computer hardware, as the generator's output frequency must be held within narrow limits to avoid malfunction.

=== Turbine controls ===
Operation of a flyball governor to control speeds of a water turbine

In steam turbines, the steam turbine governing is the procedure of monitoring and controlling the flow rate of steam into the turbine with the objective of maintaining its speed of rotation as constant. The flow rate of steam is monitored and controlled by interposing valves between the boiler and the turbine.

In water turbines, governors have been used since the mid-19th century to control their speed. A typical system would use a Flyball governor acting directly on the turbine input valve or the wicket gate to control the amount of water entering the turbine. By 1930, mechanical governors started to use PID controllers for more precise control. In the later part of the twentieth century, electronic governors and digital systems started to replace mechanical governors.

=== Electrical generator ===
For electrical generation on synchronous electrical grids, prime movers drive electrical generators which are electrically coupled to any other generators on the grid. With droop speed control, the frequency of the entire grid determines the fuel delivered to each generator, so that if the grid runs faster, the fuel is reduced to each generator by its governor to limit the speed.

=== Elevator ===
Governors are used in elevators. It acts as a stopping mechanism in case the elevator runs beyond its tripping speed (which is usually a factor of the maximum speed of the lift and is preset by the manufacturer as per the international lift safety guidelines). This device must be installed in traction elevators and roped hydraulic elevators.

=== Music box ===
Governors are used in some wind-up music boxes to keep the music playing at a somewhat constant speed while the tension on the spring is decreasing.

== See also ==
- Regulator
- Servomechanism
- Hit-and-miss engine
- Centrifugal governor
