= Scene It? Twilight =

2009 video game

- Developers: RealNetworks (iOS); Screenlife Games (DS/Wii)
- Publishers: RealNetworks (iOS); Konami (DS/Wii)
- Series: Scene It?
- Platforms: iOS, Wii, Nintendo DS, Windows
- Release: 2009
- Genre: Trivia
- Modes: Single-player, multiplayer

Scene It? Twilight is a movie trivia video game part of the Scene It? franchise. The iOS version was developed and published by RealNetworks, and the Wii and Nintendo DS versions were developed by Screenlife Games and published by Konami.

Scene It? Twilight is a movie trivia game with questions based from the movie Twilight. Up to four players can compete in the Wii version to answer questions in the fastest time about details from the movie, while all other versions are limited to single-player. The Wii version has received unfavorably mixed compilation scores of 53.40% and 49% on review aggregate websites GameRankings and Metacritic respectively.

== Gameplay ==
Most of the game's trivia is asked through text questions which are answered in a multiple choice format.

Scene It? Twilight is a trivia game about the movie Twilight. Despite being released at the same time, the game has no questions about The Twilight Saga: New Moon. The game features a number of different question types, including text-based questions and questions based on movie clips. The game has two game modes: a mode which allows players to compete through four rounds of questions, or a mode which allows the players to answer a set of either 10, 20, or 30 questions to compete for a high score.

The majority of questions in the game focus on small details from the movie. Some questions use clips from the movie and then ask the players a question, while the majority of questions are found in text form, asking the player for specific details such as Edward Cullen's birth year. Questions are either asked for all participants, or one person is in the "hot seat", and is allowed the chance to answer the question by themselves before other players are allowed to buzz in and answer.

== Reception ==
The Wii version of the game received mostly negative reviews from critics, who criticized the game's lackluster presentation and extreme difficulty; it has received compilations scores of 53.40% and 49% on review aggregate websites GameRankings and Metacritic respectively.

IGN's Levi Buchanan criticized the lack of questions about New Moon, the sequel to Twilight, noting that its film version was released at about the same time as the release of the game. GameSpot's Sophia Tong noted that the presentation of the game was lacking, as many questions failed to use clips from the movie and instead presented questions as a "giant box of text". GamePro's Mitchell Dyer criticized the repetitive music and dull narration. IGN's Levi Buchanan praised the iPhone version of Scene It? Twilight for its low price point and large variety of questions. He questioned the large price point of the Wii version in comparison to the $5 price of the iPhone version.
