= Scene It? Bright Lights! Big Screen! =

2009 video game

- North American cover art for PlayStation 3
- Developer: Artificial Mind and Movement
- Publisher: Warner Bros. Interactive Entertainment
- Series: Scene It?
- Platforms: Xbox 360; PlayStation 3 Wii
- Release: NA: November 17, 2009; AU: December 3, 2009; EU: December 4, 2009
- Genre: Trivia
- Modes: Single-player, multiplayer

Scene It? Bright Lights! Big Screen! is a trivia video game developed by Artificial Mind and Movement and published by Warner Bros. Interactive Entertainment (WBIE), and part of the Scene It? series of games. It was released for Xbox 360, PlayStation 3 and Wii on November 17, 2009, in North America, and in December 2009, in Europe and Australia. The game features puzzles from highest-grossing films at the time and from films considered the best.

== Gameplay ==
Scene It? Bright Lights! Big Screen! features more than 2,800 questions based on contemporary (present-day) and classic cinema. Players compete to provide the most correct answers to a series of questions and brain-teasers, which are often based on video clips or stills taken directly from feature films. After watching a sequence from a famous movie, players may need to choose the next line spoken (for example), or recognize the events taking place in a movie by quickly studying a freeze-frame of the action. The Bright Lights! Big Screen! edition of the game uses 23 categories of questions and puzzles. As in earlier Scene It? games, available for use on standard DVD players as well as on home computers and consoles, the controls are simple; the challenge is in recognizing the scenes and remember the characters or events hinted in the question. In Bright Lights! Big Screen!, which is designed especially for play on consoles, players can choose movie-themed outfits and props to customize the avatar character that represents them in the game.

== Development ==
Screenlife Games announced the game in a press release on September 2, 2009. It was to be the first game in the series to be also available for PlayStation 3 and Wii, as well as the Xbox 360. Screenlife Games and Warner Bros. Interactive Entertainment (WBIE) also announced a distribution agreement where WBIE would handle worldwide distribution of Scene It? Bright Lights! Big Screen!. Barry Watts, Chief Executive Officer of Screenlife Games, stated "We are thrilled to collaborate with WBIE on the release of Scene It? Bright Lights! Big Screen! [...] Combining WBIE's world-class distribution expertise with our most entertaining console trivia game to-date, Scene It? Bright Lights! Big Screen! is sure to be a smash hit with movie and pop-culture fans of all ages". John Quinn, Executive Vice President, Warner Bros. Interactive Entertainment, stated "The globally successful Scene It? brand and movie based trivia are a great fit for Warner Bros. as a games publisher and a film studio [...] We are launching Scene It? Bright Lights! Big Screen! on a variety of videogame consoles to more widely offer its dynamic entertainment experience to the expanding casual videogame audience".

== Reception ==
Reception

Aggregate score
Aggregator	Score		
Aggregator	PS3	Wii	Xbox 360
Metacritic	53/100	54/100	56/100

Review scores
Publication	Score		
Publication	PS3	Wii	Xbox 360
GameDaily	(average)	(average)	(average)
GameRevolution	D+	N/A	N/A
GameSpot	N/A	6.5/10	6/10
GameZone	5.7/10	N/A	N/A
IGN	4.9/10	4.9/10	4.9/10
Jeuxvideo.com	13/20	13/20	13/20
NGamer	N/A	35%	N/A
Official Xbox Magazine (UK)	N/A	N/A	5/10
Official Xbox Magazine (US)	N/A	N/A	6.5/10
PlayStation: The Official Magazine	3/5	N/A	N/A
Common Sense Media	4/5	4/5	4/5
Teletext GameCentral	N/A	N/A	4/10

The game received mixed reviews on all platforms according to the review aggregation website Metacritic. Official Xbox Magazine called it "A decent upgrade or introduction to the series." GameSpot noted, "This movie trivia game offers consistent multiplayer fun despite its limited feature set." IGN stated, "Scene It? Bright Lights! Big Screen! gets a few things right that a trivia game should — the clips are plentiful, the round with the edited photos is fun, and there's a fair amount of questions here — but the things it misses sink any shot this game had at being something you need to play. The bad lip syncing, the bland visuals, the inability to easily tell who is buzzing in, and so much more just keep this game from being something trivia fans like myself need to invest time and money in." GameZone commented, "Scene It? features plenty of movie trivia factoids to keep cinemaphiles happy, but a dearth of features (no online play?!?) and the availability of other, better trivia games for PlayStation 3 makes me doubt that this was ever intended for the big screen to begin with." In contrast, GameRevolution cited, "Scene It? can only be entertaining — not to mention, fair — if everyone playing not only has comparable movie knowledge but also comparable gaming experience, which is completely ridiculous for a casual party game. And the thing that's so irritating about it all is that these problems could have been fixed with almost zero effort."
