= Scene It? =

Video game series

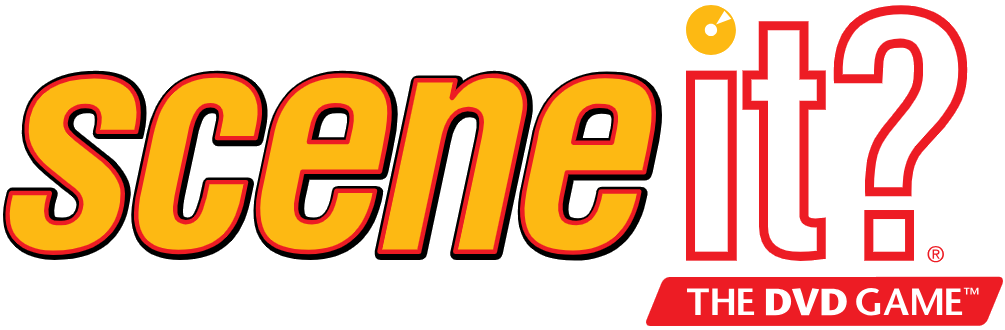
- Genre: Trivia
- Creator: Screenlife Games
- Publishers: Screenlife Games (2002–2012); Mattel (2003–2008); Imagination Games and Paramount Pictures (2022–present)
- First release: Movie Edition; 2002
- Latest release: Movies Edition; 2022

Scene It? is an interactive film board game series created by Screenlife Games, in which players answer trivia questions about films or pop culture. The games were first developed to be played with questions read from trivia cards or viewed on a television from an included DVD or based on clips from movies, TV shows, music videos, sports and other popular culture phenomena. Scene It? was released on mobile and console platforms. After discontinuation in 2012, the series was revived in 2022, with streaming functionality replacing DVDs. It has been owned by Paramount Pictures since 2008.

== History ==
Screenlife Games, the game company that invented and produced Scene It?, was founded in 2001 by two entrepreneurs, Craig Kinzer and David Long. Craig Kinzer served as the majority shareholder and chairman of the board, while David Long assumed the role of CEO.

The game's inception came from Long's use of VHS tapes for Halloween parties, which sparked Kinzer's idea of utilizing DVDs and DVD players as game machines. They devised a code to embed on DVDs that transformed any DVD player into a random game machine. With hundreds of millions of DVD players already distributed worldwide, Scene It? quickly gained popularity.

The secret to the game's success, apart from the innovative DVD code, was its ability to secure licensing agreements with major studios and associated actors and writers. Through persuasive negotiations, Long and Kinzer convinced these studios to reduce their licensing costs to a share of a small pool based on the game's gross revenue. To this day, Scene It? stands as the only product boasting involvement from all of the major studios including Universal Pictures, 20th Century Studios (known at the time as 20th Century Fox), Warner Bros. Entertainment, Sony Pictures, Metro-Goldwyn-Mayer Pictures, Paramount Pictures, Walt Disney Pictures, and DreamWorks Pictures. These studios were among the most prominent and influential in the film industry at that time.

The product's first breakthrough came when Angela Lansbury agreed to be featured in the game, followed by Tom Cruise. With studios, Universal and Fox, plus a few notable actors on board, Screenlife's licensing business flourished. The company established two royalty pools—one for studios and one for actors—encompassing thousands of individuals or entities.

To enhance gameplay, Scene It? incorporated elements from other popular games like Trivial Pursuit, Concentration, and Pictionary, creating unique play scenarios that challenged participants with movie-themed questions. For instance, Kinzer's youngest son, Austin, conceived the idea of using Concentration by displaying a spinning top on the screen, followed by an image of a gun after a few seconds, prompting players to guess the movie. These innovative additions were provided free of charge, incurring no additional expenses to Screenlife.

One of the game's additional secrets to success was the transition from selling mere discs to creating an entire board game in a large game box. This strategic move boosted the retail price from $10 to $50, further solidifying their market position and profitability. Scene It? debuted during Christmas 2002 through Wizards of the Coast and Nordstrom. Its initial season of sales exceeded all expectations, surpassing the competition, despite the countless games that fail to gain traction each year.

Recognizing the game's potential, then-owner Mattel secured a licensing agreement, leading to its availability in Walmart and stores nationwide. On October 7, 2008, Paramount Pictures, a division of Viacom, closed on its acquisition of Screenlife, marking a significant monetization for the company. Screenlife's establishment coincided with the widespread adoption of DVD players, and its sale occurred just before the rise of streaming and other digital media. The series was discontinued in 2012 when Paramount closed the studio.

In 2022, Paramount revived Scene It? as a streaming board game hosted by Mario Lopez.

== Gameplay ==
Players choose either a short or full game by adjusting the "Flextime" game board: For a short game, the board is folded so fewer spaces show. Each player throws a six-sided die to see who goes first. Then, the player rolls both the ordinary die and a customized eight-sided "category die" to see how far they move, and what challenge they face. The challenge can range from a trivia card question, a DVD challenge, ("My Play" (where a selected clip is shown and the player who is on their turn answers the question) or "All Play" (where all players can answer a non-clip question)), or they may have to draw a "Buzz card" where they follow it's instructions and the turn ends. (Cards are often renamed in special editions, such as a "Prime Directive" card in the Star Trek edition). If the roller wins the challenge, they can go again, but if they lose, the dice are handed to the next player (except in "all play" as the first player to answer the question is not the player who is on their turn they can give another player a buzz card or move forward one space, if a tie occurs a tie-breaker from the DVD is used). This process keeps going until someone hits the All Play to Win stop sign, in which that player must win one final All Play, in which everyone participates, in order to win. If not, they go to ring 3 of the zone called Final Cut and the other player who answers the question can move forward three spaces or give another player a buzz card (though players in final cut are immune from them.) There, they must answer 3 questions right. If that falls through, then on the next turn they only have to answer 2 questions, and if they fail that as well, they answer 1 question on every following turn. If a Final Cut challenge is won, then they win the game, and they get to watch a victory scene on the DVD.

All DVDs of Scene It? use Optreve DVD Enhancement Technology, designed to reshuffle itself every time it is inserted into the DVD player. In some instances, the DVD player may reset the system, and in this case, the DVD will reshuffle itself before returning players to the game menu. If a question from a previous game is shown in the same session, players can hit the "Return" button on their remote in order to start a new question. In addition, some my play clips from previous games may be reused though may show a different question. Some DVD players do not support this technology, but players can choose from 20 to 25 (depends on version) pre-set games to play. As their title suggests, these game sets are not random, and stay constant, no matter how many times the DVD is reset.

== List of games ==
=== Main series releases ===
- Movie Edition
- Junior Edition
- Music Edition
- TV Edition
- ESPN Presents: Sports Edition
- 80s Edition
- Squabble
- Movie 2nd Edition
- Comedy Movies Edition
- Harry Potter 1st Edition
- Harry Potter 2nd Edition
- Harry Potter: The Complete Cinematic Journey
- Disney Edition
- Disney 2nd Edition
- Disney Magical Moments
- Gute Zeiten Schlechte Zeiten Edition
- Pirates of the Caribbean Edition
- Disney Channel Edition
- Warner Bros. Television 50th Anniversary Edition
- Turner Classic Movies Edition
- Nickelodeon Edition
- The Simpsons Edition
- Seinfeld Edition
- Star Trek Edition
- Doctor Who Edition
- Friends Edition
- Marvel Comics Edition
- Twilight Edition
- Twilight Saga Edition
- Glee Edition
- FIFA Edition
- James Bond Collectors Edition
- Movies Edition (2022)

=== Game Packs ===
Game Packs are expansions that can be added to any Scene It? Game or can be played by themselves.

- Deluxe Movie Edition
- Sequel Pack
- James Bond Edition
- HBO Edition
- Warner Bros. Television 50th Anniversary Edition
- Family Guy Edition
- The O.C. Edition
- Disney Movie Edition

=== "To Go!": Editions ===
To Go! Editions are versions of standard games that were meant to be played in cars using portable DVD players or a car's built-in DVD player. The board was smaller and used magnetic pieces to stick to the board.

- Movies Edition
- Junior Edition
- TV Edition
- Music Edition
- 80's Music Edition
- Marvel Comics Edition
- Disney Movie Edition

=== Canceled editions ===
In 2012, in celebration of Scene It?'s 10th anniversary, two games were announced. These games would be canceled as Paramount Pictures closed Screenlife later that year.

- Star Wars Edition
- Movie Night Edition

=== Video games ===
A video game version of Scene It?, entitled Scene It? Lights, Camera, Action was released for the Xbox 360 on November 6, 2007. It featured 20 new game modes/categories and special game show-style "Big Button Controllers". The first sequel, Scene It? Box Office Smash was released on October 28, 2008, featuring the new Xbox Avatars. A second sequel, Scene It? Bright Lights! Big Screen! was released on November 17, 2009, for Xbox 360, PlayStation 3, and Wii. Opting for a multi-platform approach, this title abandoned the avatars in favor of more generic characters. After Scene It? Twilight two sequels were released: on November 18, 2010, Scene It? Harry Potter HD for iOS and on November 30, 2011, Scene It? Movie Night for Xbox 360 and PlayStation 3.

Two unsuccessful, web-only versions of the game, Scene It? Online, and Scene It? Daily, were made available online, on Facebook, and on mobile platforms. Scene It? Online borrowed strongly from the DVD games' format, including video clips, sound clips, and puzzles. Scene It? Daily was predominantly text based, and represented a major departure from the multimedia-centric roots of the series.

A sampler disc was made for the Harry Potter Scene It? game which had the same content as the game disc in the full game, but it did not come with the board, the cards, or the dice. It also came with a bonus feature. which was a behind-the-scenes featurette of the making of Harry Potter and the Goblet of Fire.
