= Android GamePad =

Samsung product

The Samsung Android GamePad was a gamepad produced by Samsung Electronics. The device served as a companion for Samsung Galaxy smartphones running on Android OS 4.1 and was optimized for Samsung devices running on Android 4.3. The gamepad was first introduced in 2013 in Seoul, South Korea. It was later released for the European Market.

== History ==
=== Development ===
Samsung's development of the Android GamePad began at the same time that Apple Inc. began allowing third-party gamepads with the implementation of iOS 7. Unlike others, Samsung's device used Bluetooth connection to link with a smartphone. Android 4.3 Galaxy phones had extended features including near-field communication support.

==== Games ====
The mobile console app allowed users to use supported games, including Need For Speed Most Wanted, Asphalt 8: Airborne, Modern Combat 4: Zero Hour, Virtua Tennis Challenge, Prince of Persia: The Shadow and the Flame, and others.

==== Further Use ====
The GamePad also allowed players to use a larger screen for mobile gaming. A mobile device was able to be connected directly to an HDTV by an HDMI cable. In addition, a phone was able to be connected wirelessly through AllShare cast screen mirroring. The device could also be connected through Samsung's Smart Dock.

== Specifications ==
Product Specifications
Compatibility	Android OS 4.1 more (Optimized for Samsung devices with Android 4.3 more)
Connectivity	Bluetooth® v3.0, NFC (Samsung devices with Android 4.3 more) 3.0 class 2, HID
Control Keys	* D-Pad (8 way): 2 Analog Sticks; 4 action buttons and 2 trigger buttons; Select button and Start button; PLAY button (Samsung devices with Android 4.3)
Dimension	137.78 x 86.47 x 31.80 mm, 195 g
Battery	Rechargeable 160mA
Color	Black
