= Interactive urinal =

Urinal with an interactive feature that can be controlled during use

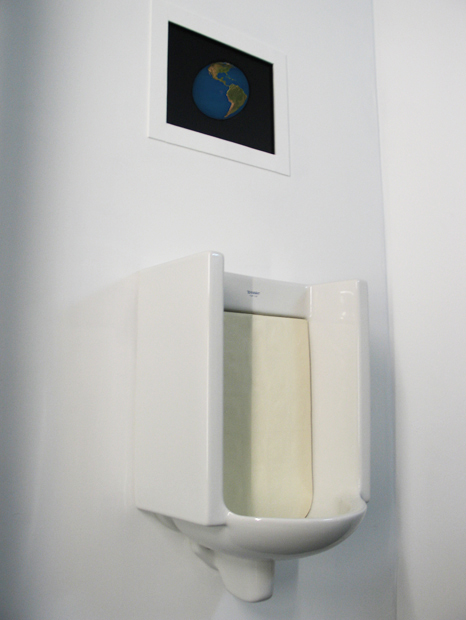
Global Warming at the Kinetica Art Fair 2010

An interactive urinal is a device that allows users to play video games or control interactive displays while urinating. Several designs have been produced to date, usually comprising a urinal fitted with a pressure sensor to measure the strength and position of the urine flow and an LCD screen mounted above the urinal to provide animated graphics.

== Captive Media ==
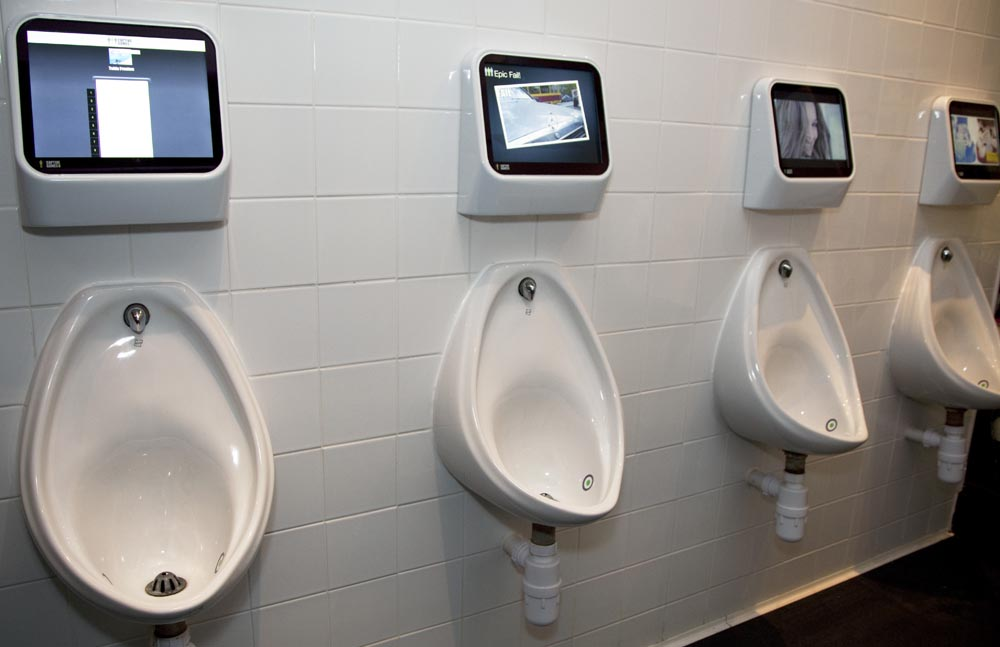
Captive Media units installed in The Exhibit Bar in Balham, London.

A British company called Captive Media developed and patented an interactive video game system for installation above urinal bowls in 2011. Their system operates by use of infra-red detection of urine temperature, with the sensors integral to the screen unit which is positioned above the bowl. Amongst others, the system is installed in The Exhibit Bar in Balham in London, and Ta Bouche Bar in Cambridge, UK.

Players control the system by directing their stream left or right. Currently the system has two games:

- On The Piste – a skiing game, in which the player must knock over penguins to score points.
- Clever Dick – a pub-quiz game, in which players must answer True or False questions.

Players can then access an affiliated website called Captive Games to view their scores on a leader board, and use Twitter to broadcast them. When not in use the screens display entertainment content, including YouTube videos and Internet memes, as well as the venue's own promotional material and third-party advertisements.

== Yanko Design ==
In 2006 the design magazine Yanko Design presented a concept for a urinal containing a pressure-sensitive display screen that is triggered when it is urinated on, producing images and sound. According to the designer, Marcel Neundorfer, it transforms urination into "more than just a necessary nuisance. By projecting the game experience into the public space, viewers are treated to a new way of visualizing the abstract, and the entertainment value is boosted."

== PlaceToPee ==
An interactive urinal named PlaceToPee, formerly named PleeStation (plee means "toilet" in Dutch), was devised in Belgium by software engineer Werner Dupont and electrical engineer Bar Geraets. The pair came up with the idea during a drinking session in a bar and attracted the interest of sanitary equipment company Guedens Sanitair Verhuur, which provided financial support to develop a single PlaceToPee unit. The PlaceToPee was installed in the 2007 GamePower Expo in Ghent with a racing game that allowed visitors to steer on-screen cars with their urine. The system gave warnings to players about drunk driving if their urine was off-target. It was shut down after the Belgian police deemed it to be indecent. The following year the makers displayed the PlaceToPee at the "Arendonk Zingt & Swingt" festival. It allowed users to answer on-screen questions by urinating in a particular direction. The creators publicly expressed confidence in their product and suggested that it could be used as a sophisticated means of counting votes for the Miss Belgium contest. Women are catered for by providing them with a cardboard cone to direct their urine.

== Interactive urinal communicator ==
The interactive urinal communicator is an advertising device invented by bioengineer Dr. Richard Deutsch for the Islip, New York company Wizmark. The 3.5-inch (8.9 cm) screen is placed in a urinal to promote products or services. Deutsch commented, "Now when nature calls, there is going to be something entertaining to look at and listen to."

Features of the advertising include:

- Flashing lights that are activated by physical presence, or actual urination
- A lenticular image that changes depending on viewpoint
- A 16-second pre-recorded audio message
- A temperature-sensitive image

Deutsch commented to Marketing Magazine that "Beginning with early attempts at writing one's name in the snow, there has always been an element of recreation associated with urination for men." Such advertising vehicles are not entirely new: some plain screens have carried advertising for a few years now and poster style ads in washrooms are quite common. The use of interactive urinal screens is being advocated by guerrilla marketers.

== Global Warming ==
In 2009, artist Ricardo Carvalho and programmer Alias Cummings created an interactive urinal entitled Global Warming, in which the trail of urine hits on a grid of ultra sensitive piezos housed within the urinal. The strength and direction of the urine is calculated and used to control the navigation of a 3D Earth globe, leaving a trail of thousands of Google Earth place markers on its surface. The spectator's action is reminiscent of spraying, the animal behaviour of identifying and marking territory. Global Warming, besides its obvious environmental connotation, is an ironic take on how primitive territorial instincts, such as the visceral act of spraying, can be exercised through supposedly intelligent and networked devices and at the same time disguised by them.

== Sega Toylet ==
Screenshot from Manneken Pis, a game for the Sega Toylet, in which the player's score depends on how much urine that has been produced (in this case 242 ml)

The Japanese company Sega has developed an interactive urinal system called the Toylet. A choice of four mini-games can be selected:

- Manneken Pis, named after the eponymous statue of a urinating boy in Brussels, awards the player a score based on how hard and how much they can urinate.
- Graffiti Eraser requires the player to spray urine around to clean graffiti off a virtual wall.
- The Northern Wind, The Sun and Me puts the player in the role of the wind trying to lift a girl's skirt by blowing air at her – the strength of the wind depends on the force of the flow of urine.
- Battle! Milk From Nose allows the player to compete against the person who last used the urinal by comparing the strength of their urine streams. The streams are represented on-screen as jets of milk squirting out of the noses of two characters standing in a sumo ring. If the player's urine stream is stronger, his opponent is blasted out of the ring.

The Toylet records players' scores and allows them to be saved onto a USB memory stick. Advertisements are shown between games. The system was installed in the men's toilets in four stations of the Tokyo Metro, including Akihabara, Soga, and Ikebukuro. It was trialed until the end of January 2011. Some units are available at the new Tokyo Sega Joypolis.

Simulated versions of Toylets are playable in the video game Yakuza Kiwami 2.
