= Steam turbine governing =

Control system in steam turbines

Steam turbine governing is the procedure of controlling the flow rate of steam to a steam turbine so as to maintain its speed of rotation as constant. The variation in load during the operation of a steam turbine can have a significant impact on its performance. In a practical situation the load frequently varies from the designed or economic load, and thus there always exists a considerable deviation from the desired performance of the turbine. The primary objective in the steam turbine operation is to maintain a constant speed of rotation irrespective of the varying load. This can be achieved by means of governing in a steam turbine. There are many types of governors.

== Overview ==
Steam turbine governing is the procedure of monitoring and controlling the flow rate of steam into the turbine with the objective of maintaining its speed of rotation as constant. The flow rate of steam is monitored and controlled by interposing valves between the boiler and the turbine. Depending upon the particular method adopted for control of steam flow rate, different types of governing methods are being practiced. The principal methods used for governing are described below.

== Throttle governing ==
In a throttle, governing the pressure of steam is reduced at the turbine entry, thereby decreasing the availability of energy. In this method steam is passed through a restricted passage, thereby reducing its pressure across the governing valve. The flow rate is controlled using a partially opened steam control valve. The reduction in pressure leads to a throttling process in which the enthalpy of steam remains constant.

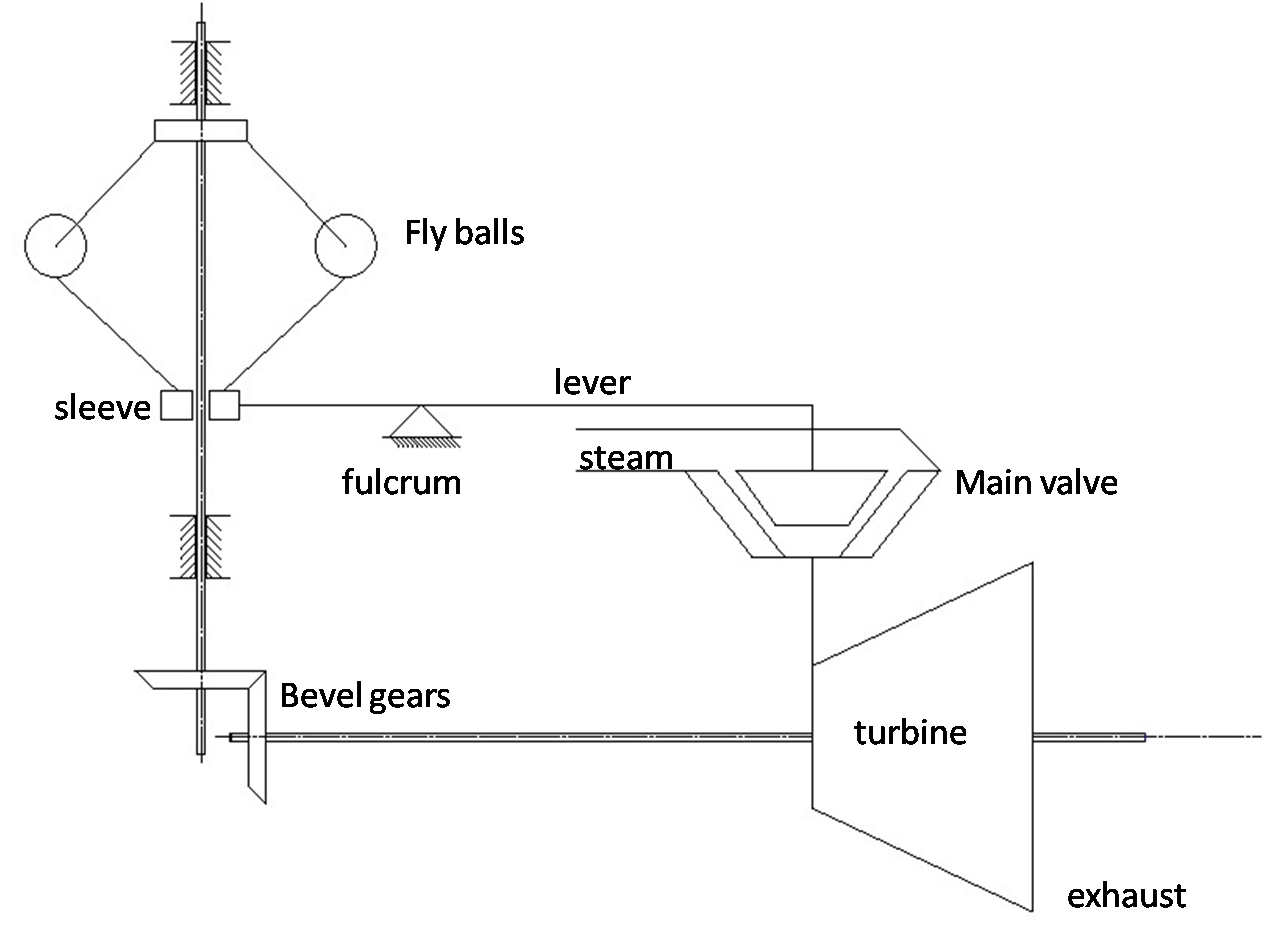
Figure1: 2-D schematic of throttle governor

=== Throttle governing – Small turbines ===
Low initial cost and a simple mechanism make throttle governing the most apt method for small steam turbines. The mechanism is illustrated in Figure 1. The valve is actuated by using a centrifugal governor which consists of flying balls attached to the arm of the sleeve. A geared mechanism connects the turbine shaft to the rotating shaft on which the sleeve reciprocates axially. With a reduction in the load, the turbine shaft speed increases and brings about the movement of the flying balls away from the sleeve axis. This results in an axial movement of the sleeve followed by the activation of a lever, which in turn actuates the main stop valve to a partially opened position to control the flow rate.

=== Throttle governing – Big turbines ===
In larger steam turbines an oil operated servo mechanism is used in order to enhance the lever sensitivity. The use of a relay system magnifies the small deflections of the lever connected to the governor sleeve. The differential lever is connected at both the ends to the governor sleeve and the throttle valve spindle, respectively. The pilot valve's spindle is also connected to the same lever at some intermediate position. Both the pilot valves cover one port each in the oil chamber. The outlets of the oil chamber are connected to an oil drain tank through pipes. The decrease in load during operation of the turbine will bring about an increase in the shaft speed thereby lifting the governor sleeve. Deflection occurs in the lever, and due to this, the pilot valve spindle raises up opening the upper port for oil entry and the lower port for oil exit. Pressurized oil from the oil tank enters the cylinder and pushes the relay piston downwards. As the relay piston moves, the throttle valve spindle attached to it also descends and partially closes the valve. Thus the steam flow rates can be controlled. When the load on the turbine increases, the deflections in the lever are such that the lower port is opened for oil entry and upper port for oil exit. The relay piston moves upwards and the throttle valve spindle ascends upwards, opening the valve. The variation of the steam consumption rate ṁ (kg/h) with the turbine load during throttle governing is linear and is given by the “willan’s line”.

The equation for the willan’s line is given by:

ṁ=aL+C

Where a is the steam rate in kg/kWh, 'L' is the load on turbine in KW and C is no load steam consumption.

== Nozzle governing ==
In nozzle governing the flow rate of steam is regulated by opening and shutting of sets of nozzles rather than regulating its pressure. In this method groups of two, three or more nozzles form a set and each set is controlled by a separate valve. The actuation of individual valve closes the corresponding set of nozzle thereby controlling the flow rate. In actual turbine, nozzle governing is applied only to the first stage whereas the subsequent stages remain unaffected. Since no regulation to the pressure is applied, the advantage of this method lies in the exploitation of full boiler pressure and temperature. Figure 2 shows the mechanism of nozzle governing applied to steam turbines. As shown in the figure the three sets of nozzles are controlled by means of three separate valves.

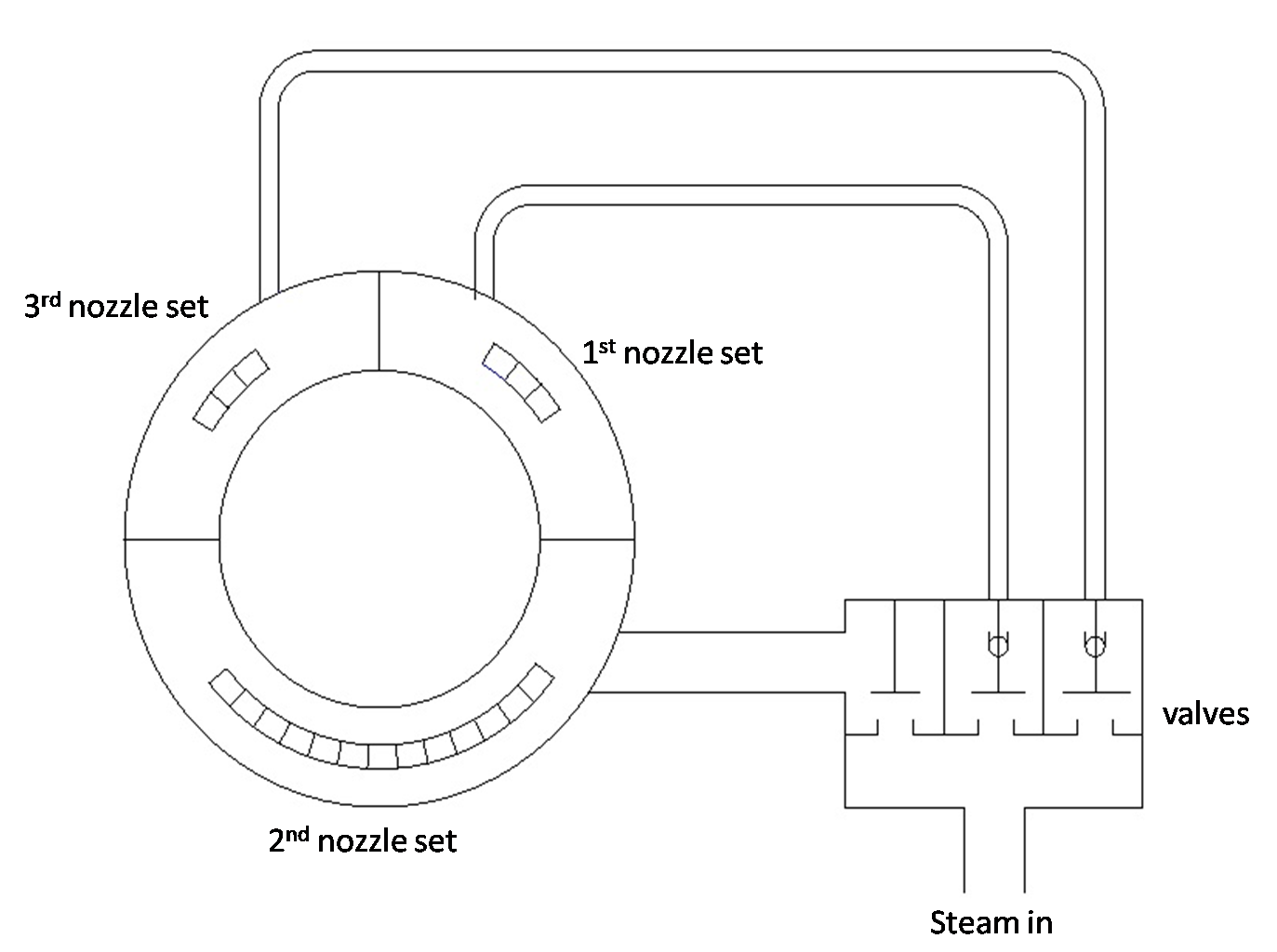
Figure2: 2-D schematic of nozzle governor

== By pass governing ==
Occasionally the turbine is overloaded for short durations. During such operation, bypass valves are opened and fresh steam is introduced into the later stages of the turbine. This generates more energy to satisfy the increased load. The schematic of bypass governing is as shown in figure3. This governing is use for stable steam velocity and maintain flow rate of steam in turbine blade

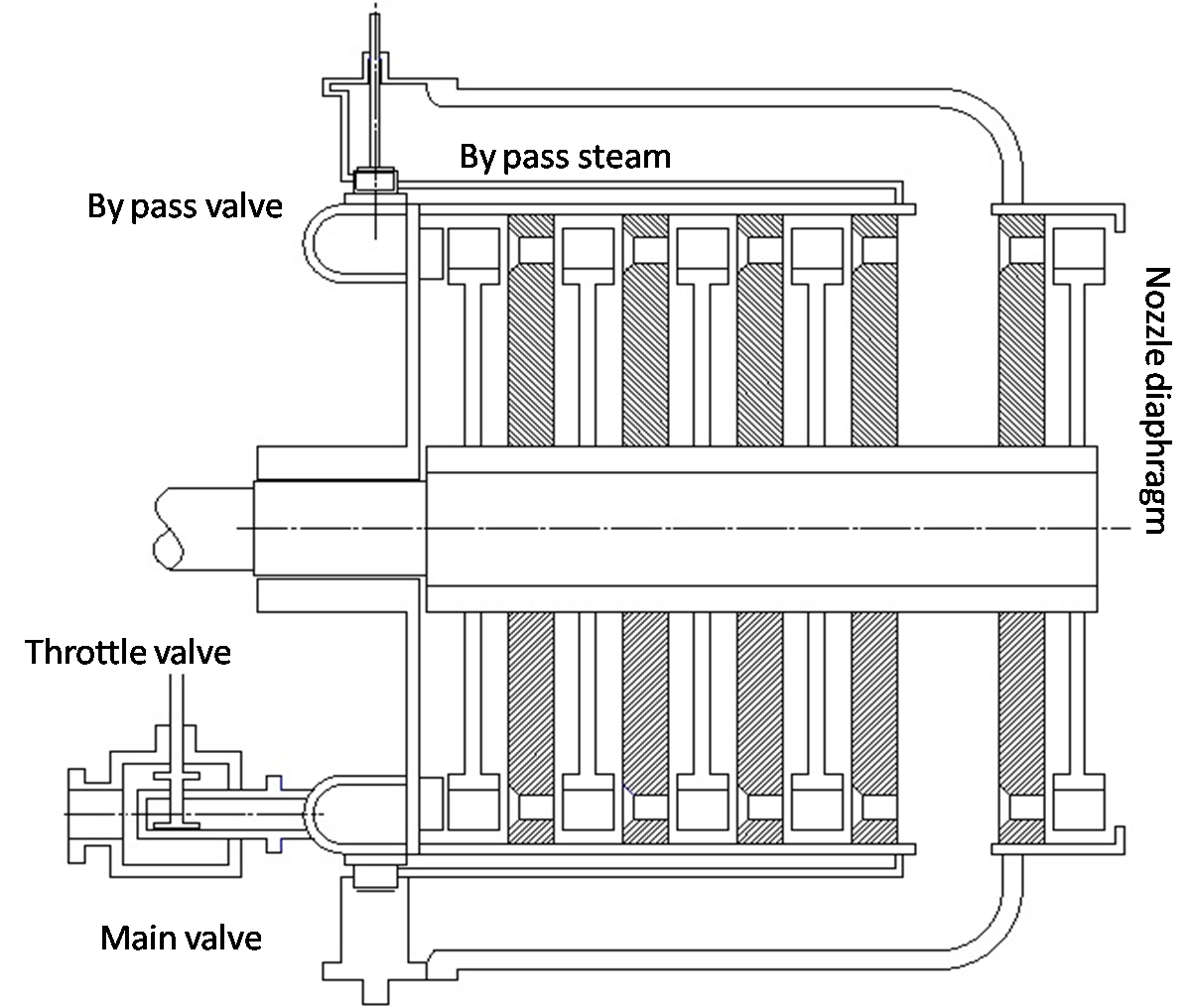
Figure3: 2-D schematic of bypass governor

== Combination governing ==
Combination governing employs usage of any two of the above mentioned methods of governing. Generally bypass and nozzle governing are used simultaneously to match the load on turbine as shown in figure 3.

== Emergency governing ==
Every steam turbine is also provided with emergency governors which come into action under the following conditions. Alternately referred to as stop actuators, these independent systems typically serve to completely shut down the turbine, rather than regulate its speed under operating conditions. This is accomplished by completely closing the turbine throttle and stop valves, halting all steam flow into the turbine, and potentially opening a bypass valve to prevent upstream overpressure.

- Increase of the mechanical speed of shaft beyond 110%
- Disturbed balancing of the turbine
- Failure of the lubrication system
- Loss of control hydraulic pressure
- Loss of power to turbine control systems
- Inadequate condenser vacuum in the case of a condensing turbine
- Inadequate supply of coolant to the condenser
- Manual or automatic turbine protection system trip
