= Scene It? Box Office Smash =

2008 video game

- European cover art
- Developers: Krome Studios; Screenlife Games
- Publisher: Microsoft Game Studios
- Series: Scene It?
- Platform: Xbox 360
- Release: NA: October 28, 2008; EU: November 28, 2008
- Genre: Party
- Modes: Single-player, multiplayer

Scene It? Box Office Smash is a party video game and an adaptation of Scene It? for the Xbox 360. It is the sequel to Scene It? Lights, Camera, Action and comes bundled with Big Button Pads. The game was developed by Krome Studios and Screenlife Games and released on October 28, 2008, in North America, and on November 28, 2008, in Europe. The title is one of the first games to feature Xbox Avatars. A downloadable question pack called "Award Winners" was available on Xbox Live Marketplace, offering 800 new questions.

== Gameplay ==
Gameplay in Scene It? Box Office Smash

Like other games in the series, Box Office Smash is a trivia game where up to four players test their movie trivia knowledge over several themed rounds composed of five questions each. Some rounds have players watching a clip from a well-known movie, then answering questions based on what was shown in the scene, while others are more abstract, such as a round in which players have to identify the names of movies based on drawings that depict not the content of the film but rather the words that compose its title.

The game features 267 English-language films, along with some Italian, French, Spanish and German films for non-US players.

== Development ==
During Microsoft's Press Conference at E3 2008, Shane Kim announced Box Office Smash, along with You're in the Movies, another party game. According to the trailer shown at the conference, the game appeared to be pretty similar to the game that came out in 2007, but with the support of the avatar system that Microsoft announced earlier. The trailer showed an increasingly large crowd of people in an electronics store playing the game. Gameplay footage was also shown during the conference.

== Reception ==
Reception

Aggregate scores
Aggregator	Score
GameRankings	75.91%
Metacritic	76/100

Review scores
Publication	Score
Eurogamer	6/10
GameSpot	8/10
GameZone	7.5/10
IGN	7/10
TeamXbox	8/10
VideoGamer.com	7/10
Gameplanet	8/10

Scene It? Box Office Smash received positive reviews from critics upon release. On Metacritic, the game holds a score of 76/100 based on 32 reviews, indicating "generally favorable reviews". On GameRankings, the game holds a score of 75.91% based on 33 reviews.
