= Scene It? Lights, Camera, Action =

2007 video game

- Developer: Screenlife Games / WXP
- Publisher: Microsoft Game Studios
- Series: Scene It?
- Platform: Xbox 360
- Release: NA: November 6, 2007; EU: November 16, 2007; AU: November 29, 2007
- Genre: Party
- Modes: Single-player, multiplayer

Scene It? Lights, Camera, Action is a party video game and an adaptation of Scene It? for the Xbox 360. It was developed by Screenlife Games and released on November 6, 2007, in North America, November 16, 2007, Europe, and on November 29, 2007, in Australia.

== Gameplay ==
Gameplay in Scene It? Lights, Camera, Action

Scene It? Lights, Camera, Action is a trivia game similar to other games in the series where up to four players test their movie trivia knowledge over several themed rounds composed of five questions each. One round requires them to watch a scene from a specific movie, while others are based on quotes, scrolling credits, or a child's drawing.

== Development ==
The game was announced at E3 2007.

== Big Button Pad ==
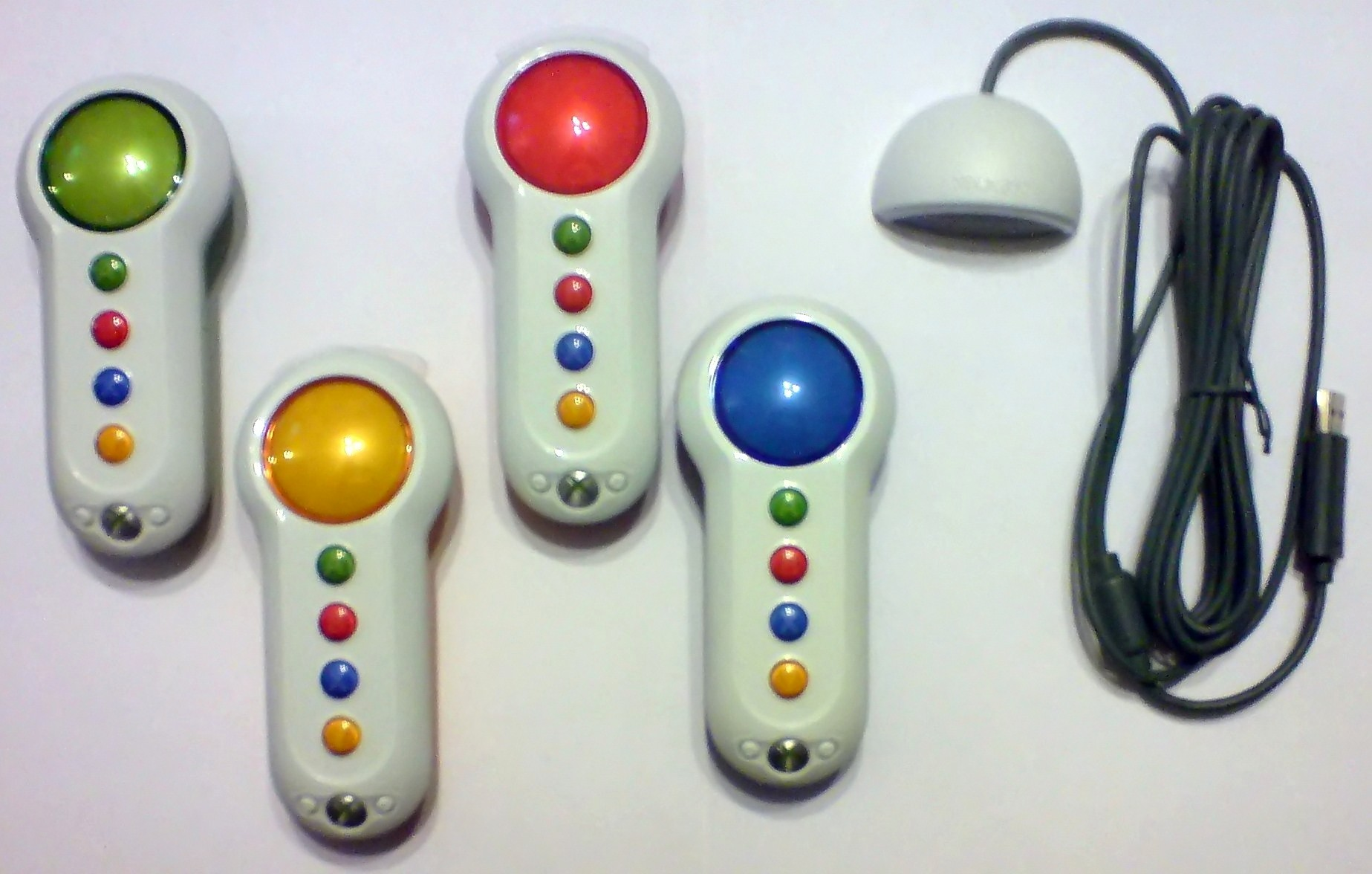
Xbox 360 Big Button Pads with the infrared receiver

The game comes bundled with four special wireless controllers called Big Button Pads, which work similarly to the Buzz! buzzer controllers. Each Big Button Pad has one large "buzzer" button at the top and four smaller buttons for answering multiple-choice questions. The Big Button Pads use infrared rather than Microsoft's proprietary wireless standard, and while the Xbox 360 has an infrared receiver, it is not designed to interface with four devices simultaneously; therefore a sensor add-on is included and must be plugged into the Xbox 360 for the Big Button Pads to be usable.

== Reception ==
Reception

Aggregate scores
Aggregator	Score
GameRankings	73.56%
Metacritic	73/100

Review scores
Publication	Score
Eurogamer	7/10
Game Informer	8.5/10
GameSpot	7.5/10
GameSpy	3.5/5 stars
GamesRadar+	3.5/5 stars
GameZone	7/10
IGN	7/10
TeamXbox	7.8/10

Scene It? Lights, Camera, Action received mixed from critics upon release. On Metacritic, the game holds a score of 73/100 based on 41 reviews, indicating "mixed or average reviews". On GameRankings, the game holds a score of 73.56% based on 44 reviews.

== Awards ==
Scene It? Lights, Camera, Action was an Academy of Interactive Arts & Sciences nominee for 2007 Family Game of the Year.

== Sequel ==
A sequel, Scene It? Box Office Smash was released on October 28, 2008.
