= List of game controllers =

The following is a list of game controllers. It includes input devices that are notable and whose primary function is to control how the video games are played. Regional variants and models containing insignificant changes are not included.

== Controllers ==
Name	Image	Platform	Specifications	Original release date	Refs
Magnavox Odyssey controller		Magnavox Odyssey	Connectivity: Magnavox Odyssey controller port Input: 3 knobs, 1 button	September 1972	
Shooting Gallery		Magnavox Odyssey	Connectivity: Magnavox Odyssey controller port Input: 1 trigger, photodiode	September 1972	
Atari CX40 joystick		Atari 2600	Connectivity: Atari joystick port Input: 1 digital button, eight-directional digital joystick	1978	
NES/Famicom controller		NES	Connectivity: NES controller port Input: 4 digital buttons, D-pad, microphone (Famicom only)	July 15, 1983	
NES Zapper		NES	Connectivity: NES controller port Input: 1 trigger, photodiode	February 18, 1984	
Master System controller		Master System	Connectivity: Master System controller port Input: 2 digital buttons, D-pad	September 1986	
NES Advantage		NES	Connectivity: NES controller port Input: 4 digital buttons, 2 adjustable knobs, 3 toggle buttons, 1 switch	1987	
Sega Genesis/Mega Drive controller		Sega Genesis	Connectivity: Sega Genesis controller port Input: 4 digital buttons, D-pad	October 29, 1988	
Nintendo Power Glove		NES	Connectivity: NES controller port Input: D-pad, A, B, Start, Select, Turbo Buttons	December 3, 1989	
SNES/Super Famicom controller		SNES	Connectivity: SNES controller port Input: 8 digital buttons, D-pad	November 21, 1990	
Gravis PC GamePad		DOS	Connectivity: DA-15 game port Input: 4 digital buttons, 2 switches, D-pad	1992	
Menacer		Sega Genesis	Connectivity: Sega Genesis controller port Input: 4 buttons, 2 infrared transmitters	1992	
Super Scope		SNES	Connectivity: 2nd SNES controller port Dimensions: 23 inches long Input: 3 digital buttons, 1 switch, photodiode	1992	
6-Button Arcade Pad		Sega Genesis	Connectivity: Sega Genesis controller port Input: 8 digital buttons, D-pad	1993	
Sega Saturn controller		Sega Saturn	Connectivity: Sega Saturn controller port Input: 9 digital buttons, D-pad	November 22, 1994	
PlayStation controller		PlayStation	Connectivity: PlayStation controller port Input: 10 digital buttons, D-pad	December 3, 1994	
Virtual Boy controller		Virtual Boy	Connectivity: Virtual Boy controller port Input: 2 D-pads, 6 digital buttons, power switch	July 21, 1995	
Apple Pippin controller		Apple Pippin	Connectivity: P-ADB; Input: 9 digital buttons, D-pad, trackball	March 28, 1996	
Nintendo 64 controller		Nintendo 64	Connectivity: Nintendo 64 controller port, Controller Pak slot Input: 1 analog stick, 10 digital buttons, D-pad	June 23, 1996	
SpaceOrb 360		PC	Connectivity: Serial Input: 6-axis rubber ball, 6 buttons	1996	
ASCII Sphere 360	ASCII Sphere 360	PlayStation	Connectivity: PlayStation controller port Input: 6-axis rubber ball, 10 buttons, D-pad		
3D Pad		Sega Saturn	Connectivity: Sega Saturn controller port Input: 7 digital buttons, 1 analog stick, 2 analog triggers, 1 toggle switch, D-pad	July 5, 1996	
Dual Analog Controller		PlayStation	Connectivity: PlayStation controller port Input: 10 digital buttons, 2 clickable analog sticks, 1 toggle button, D-pad	April 25, 1997	
DualShock		PlayStation	Connectivity: PlayStation controller port Input: 10 digital buttons, 2 clickable analog sticks, 1 toggle button, D-pad	November 20, 1997	
Dreamcast controller		Dreamcast	Connectivity: Dreamcast controller port, 2 expansion sockets Input: 1 analog stick, 2 analog triggers, 5 digital buttons, D-pad	November 27, 1998	
DualShock 2		PlayStation 2	Connectivity: PlayStation controller port Input: 2 clickable analog sticks, 8 pressure-sensitive buttons, 2 digital buttons, 1 toggle button, pressure-sensitive D-pad	March 4, 2000	
Nintendo GameCube controller		GameCube	Connectivity: GameCube controller port Input: 2 analog sticks, 2 clickable analog triggers, 6 digital buttons, D-pad	September 14, 2001	
Xbox controller (aka The Duke)		Xbox	Connectivity: Xbox controller port, 2 Memory Unit slots Dimensions: 6.5 × 5 × 3 in Input: 2 analog triggers, 2 clickable analog sticks, 2 digital buttons, 6 pressure-sensitive buttons, D-pad; Mass: <16 oz.	November 15, 2001	
Xbox Controller S		Xbox	Connectivity: Xbox controller port, 2 Memory Unit slots Input: 2 analog triggers, 2 clickable analog sticks (offset), 2 digital buttons, 6 pressure-sensitive buttons, D-pad	2002	
Xbox 360 controller		Xbox 360	Connectivity: USB, wireless (proprietary 2.4 GHz protocol), 2.5 mm headset jack Input: 2 analog triggers, 2 clickable analog sticks (offset), 10 digital buttons, D-pad	November 22, 2005	
MotionFX		PlayStation 2	Connectivity: Wired; Input: 1, accelerometer, gyroscope added Sixaxis like Motion to Early Playstation 2 Controllers	Mid, 2006	
Sixaxis		PlayStation 3	Connectivity: Bluetooth, USB; Input: 2 clickable analog sticks, 2 analog triggers, 6 pressure-sensitive buttons, 3 digital buttons, pressure-sensitive D-pad, accelerometer, gyroscope	November 11, 2006	
Wii Remote		Wii	Connectivity: Bluetooth, Accessory connector port (400 kHz I²C); Input: 8 digital buttons, accelerometer, D-pad, gyroscope (Wii Remote Plus only), infrared sensor	November 19, 2006	
Nunchuk		Wii	Connectivity: Accessory connector plug (400 kHz I²C); Input: 1 analog stick, 2 digital buttons, accelerometer,	November 19, 2006	
Classic Controller		Wii	Connectivity: Accessory connector plug (400 kHz I²C); Input: 2 analog sticks, 2 clickable analog triggers, 9 digital buttons, D-pad	November 19, 2006	
DualShock 3		PlayStation 3	Connectivity: Bluetooth, USB; Input: 2 clickable analog sticks, 2 analog triggers, 6 pressure-sensitive buttons, 3 digital buttons, pressure-sensitive D-pad, accelerometer, gyroscope	November 11, 2007	
Classic Controller Pro		Wii	Connectivity: Accessory connector plug (400 kHz I²C); Input: 2 analog sticks, 11 digital buttons, D-pad	Early 2009	
Dual FragFx Controller		PlayStation 3 / Xbox	Connectivity: Bluetooth, USB; Input: Dual Mouse / Nunchuk Combo analog stick, Adjustable Pressure sensitive "Frag" trigger for resolution change on Nunchuk, additional digital buttons, D-pad, accelerometer, gyroscope	Mid 2010	
PlayStation Move		PlayStation 3, PlayStation 4	Connectivity: Bluetooth, mini-USB port Input: 1 analog trigger, 8 digital buttons, accelerometer, gyroscope, magnetometer	September 15, 2010	
PlayStation Move Navigation controller		PlayStation 3	Connectivity: Mini-USB port Input: 1 analog trigger, 1 clickable analog stick, 4 digital buttons, D-pad	September 15, 2010	
Kinect for Xbox 360		Xbox 360	Connectivity: USB 2.0; Dimensions: 282 × 68 × 70 mm Input: 1 RGB camera, 2 infrared depth sensors, four-microphone array Mass: 1360 g	November 4, 2010	
Wii U GamePad		Wii U	Connectivity: Proprietary wireless, Accessory Connector port, AC adapter port, headset jack, near-field communication Input: 13 digital buttons, 2 clickable analog sticks, touchscreen, D-pad, accelerometer, front-facing camera, infrared transceiver, gyroscope, magnetometer, microphone, slider	November 18, 2012	
Wii U Pro Controller		Wii U	Connectivity: Bluetooth; Input: 2 clickable analog sticks, 12 digital buttons, D-pad	November 18, 2012	
Ouya Controller		Ouya	Connectivity: Bluetooth; Dimensions: 163 x 109 x 53.5 mm Input: 2 clickable analog sticks (offset), 2 analog triggers, 7 digital buttons, Touchpad,D-Pad; Mass: 275 g	June 25, 2013	
DualShock 4		PlayStation 4	Connectivity: Bluetooth, Micro-USB, 3.5 mm stereo headset jack, extension port Dimensions: 161 × 57 × 100 mm Input: 9 digital buttons, 2 analog triggers, 2 clickable analog sticks, accelerometer, D-pad, gyroscope, two-point capacitive clickable touchpad Mass: 210 g	November 15, 2013	
Xbox Wireless Controller		Xbox One, Xbox Series X/S	Connectivity: Propriety Wireless, Micro USB (revisions prior to Elite Series 2), USB-C (Elite Series 2 and third revision), 3.5 mm stereo audio jack (after first revision), Bluetooth 4.0 (second revision), Bluetooth LE (third revision); Dimensions: 153 × 102 × 61 mm Input: 2 clickable analog sticks (offset), 2 analog triggers (LT, RT), 2 shoulder buttons (LB, RB), 9 digital buttons (Y, B, A, X, Menu, Options, Home), 1 Share button (third revision) and Digital D-Pad	November 22, 2013	
Kinect for Xbox One		Xbox One	Connectivity: USB 3.0; Dimensions: 249 × 66 × 67 mm Input: 1 RGB camera, 1 infrared depth sensor, four-microphone array Mass: 1.4 kg	November 22, 2013	
Steam Controller (1st generation)		Linux, Mac OS, Windows	Connectivity: Micro-USB, wireless Input: 2 clickable analog triggers, clickable analog stick, 2 clickable touchpads, 9 digital buttons, accelerometer, gyroscope	November 10, 2015	
Joy-Con		Nintendo Switch	Connectivity: Bluetooth; R: near-field communication Dimensions: 102 × 35.9 × 28.4 mm Input: Accelerometer, gyroscope; L: 10 digital buttons, clickable analog stick; R: 10 digital buttons, clickable analog stick, infrared motion camera Mass: L: ≈ 49.3 g; R: ≈ 52.2 g	March 3, 2017	
Nintendo Switch Pro Controller		Nintendo Switch	Connectivity: USB-C, Bluetooth, near-field communication Input: Accelerometer, gyroscope; 13 digital buttons, D-pad, 2 clickable analog sticks	March 3, 2017	
Google Stadia Controller		Google Stadia	Connectivity: Wi-Fi, USB-C, Bluetooth Low Energy 4.2 (BLE), 3.5mm stereo headset jack Dimensions: 163 x 105 x 65 mm Input: 2 clickable analog sticks, 2 analog triggers, 11 digital buttons, and D-Pad; Mass: 268 g	November 19, 2019	
Sinden Light Gun		Windows, Linux	Connectivity: USB-A; Input: D-pad, 4 buttons	September 2020	
DualSense		PlayStation 5	Connectivity: USB-C, Bluetooth 5.1, 3.5mm TRRS (OMTP) stereo headset jack Dimensions: 160 × 66 × 106 mm Input: 6 axis motion sensing (3 axis accelerometer, 3 axis gyroscope), 2 clickable analog sticks, 2 analog triggers, 9 digital buttons, D-pad, 2 point capacitive touchpad with click mechanism, microphone, microphone mute button Mass: 280 g	November 12, 2020	
Amazon Luna Controller		Amazon Luna	Connectivity: Wi-Fi, USB-C, Bluetooth Low Energy 4.2 (BLE), 3.5mm stereo headset Dimensions: 156.4 x 107.6 x 58.5 mm Input: 2 clickable analog sticks (offset), 2 analog triggers, 10 digital buttons, and D-Pad; Mass: 281.5 g	March 1, 2022	
Joy-Con 2		Nintendo Switch 2	Connectivity: Bluetooth; R: near-field communication Dimensions: 102 × 35.9 × 28.4 mm Input: Accelerometer, gyroscope; L: 10 digital buttons, clickable analog stick, optical mouse sensor; R: 11 digital buttons, clickable analog stick, optical mouse sensor Mass: L: ≈ 66 g; R: ≈ 67 g	June 5, 2025	
Nintendo Switch 2 Pro Controller		Nintendo Switch 2	Connectivity: USB-C, Bluetooth, near-field communication Input: Accelerometer, gyroscope; 13 digital buttons, D-Pad, 2 clickable analog sticks	June 5, 2025	
Steam Controller (2nd generation)		Linux, Mac OS, Windows	Connectivity: USB-C, Bluetooth, USB-C Receiver; Dimensions: 111 × 159 × 57 mm Input: 6 axis IMU (3 axis accelerometer, 3 axis gyroscope), 14 digital buttons, D-Pad, 2 clickable analog sticks with capacitive touch, 2 analog triggers, 2 pressure sensitive touchpads, 2 capacitive grip sensors Mass: 292 g	May 4, 2026	

== Mice ==
The following is a list of gaming mice, mice which are designed specifically to play games:

Name	Image	Platform	Specifications	Original release date	Refs
Super NES Mouse		SNES	Connectivity: SNES controller port Input: 2 buttons	July 14, 1992	
PlayStation Mouse		PlayStation	Connectivity: PlayStation controller port Input: 2 buttons	December 3, 1994	

== See also ==
- N-Control Avenger, an attachment for video game controllers
