= Pro Controller =

Pro Controller may refer to:

- Classic Controller Pro
- Wii U Pro Controller
- Nintendo Switch Pro Controller
  - Nintendo Switch 2 Pro Controller
