= Joypad =

Joypad may refer to:

- Gamepad, a type of game controller held in two hands, where the fingers (especially thumbs) are used to provide input
- D-pad, a flat, usually thumb-operated, directional control on most modern gamepads, handheld game consoles, and remote controllers
- Joypad (magazine), a monthly French gaming magazine published since 1991
