= Nostromo (game controller) =

Video game keypad controller

- Manufacturer: Belkin, Razer
- Type: Gaming peripheral
- Released: 2001
- Connectivity: USB

The Nostromo is a USB video game controller designed by Belkin. Formerly called the Belkin Nostromo SpeedPad, it was succeeded by the Razer Nostromo, which was co-developed by Belkin and Razer. It can be considered a keyboard/joystick/mouse hybrid, commonly (as of 2025) referred to as a "gaming keypad" by online retailers. It can also be used outside of games, for example to support cartographic software.

== Models ==
The first model of the Nostromo, the Belkin Nostromo SpeedPad n50, was announced in 2001 alongside the company's n30 GameMouse as a double-handed control system.

In January 2008, an updated version called the n52 Tournament Edition was released. This version does not feature the word "Nostromo", and has the additional "te" in styling, meaning "Tournament Edition". The device is black and has a blue backlit keypad and scroll wheel. The user can "hot-swap" player profiles, a capability supported by built-in memory. The device runs software created by Razer.

On November 29, 2010, Razer released the Razer Nostromo, an upgraded version of the Belkin controller that increased the amount of switchable keymaps and profiles.

== Specifications ==
The n52 is made in a black and silver design with a few orange accents. It features a rubber-coated base, and is weighed down with a metal weight for stability. The user must place his left hand on the device to use it, as it was designed for right-handed people, who usually use a mouse with their right hands. The n52 has a movable hand rest which can be set to 2 locations or removed to create 3 different hand positions to better suit various hand sizes by means of lifting the rest off the unit.

A large space is used for a keyboard-like section with 14 keyboard keys, numbered 1 through 14, by default used to represent the WASD space on regular keyboards in the case of first-person shooters, one of the intended target audiences of the n52. These keys can be controlled with the users second to fifth fingers. Below where the thumb rests, there is a slightly wider keyboard-style button, labeled 15, similar in use to the shift key on regular keyboards.

On the right side of the device, there is a scroll wheel, like those normally found on mice, which can be controlled with the index finger. To the right of that, there is a round button, as well as an 8-way D-pad normally found on gamepads, intended to be used with the thumb.

== Programming ==
All of these controls can be programmed with the included "Nostromo Array Programming Software" to emulate any keyboard function or keyboard macro. They can also be programmed to change the device's "state". The n52 has 4 different color-coded states, indicated by 3 LEDs below the fifteenth button. If a user changes the state of the device from the normal one, the red, green, or blue LED lights up, and all other controls now represent a different function. The state-button can be set to act as a temporary shift button that works while it is pressed, a toggle button, or it can be set to work until it is pressed again. In total, this allows up to 104 different functions. The software can recognize games by their executable filenames, and automatically load the appropriate profile when that game is started. User-created profiles, which are technically single files, can be submitted to Belkin via e-mail, making them available for others to download.

The ability to add macros allows users to more easily work with data in spreadsheets and similar programs by creating a row of: Cut, Copy, Paste, and Enter keys, and by making the D-pad emulate the arrow keys.

== See also ==
- WASD
