= Nintendo Switch Pro Controller =

Alternative controller for the Nintendo Switch

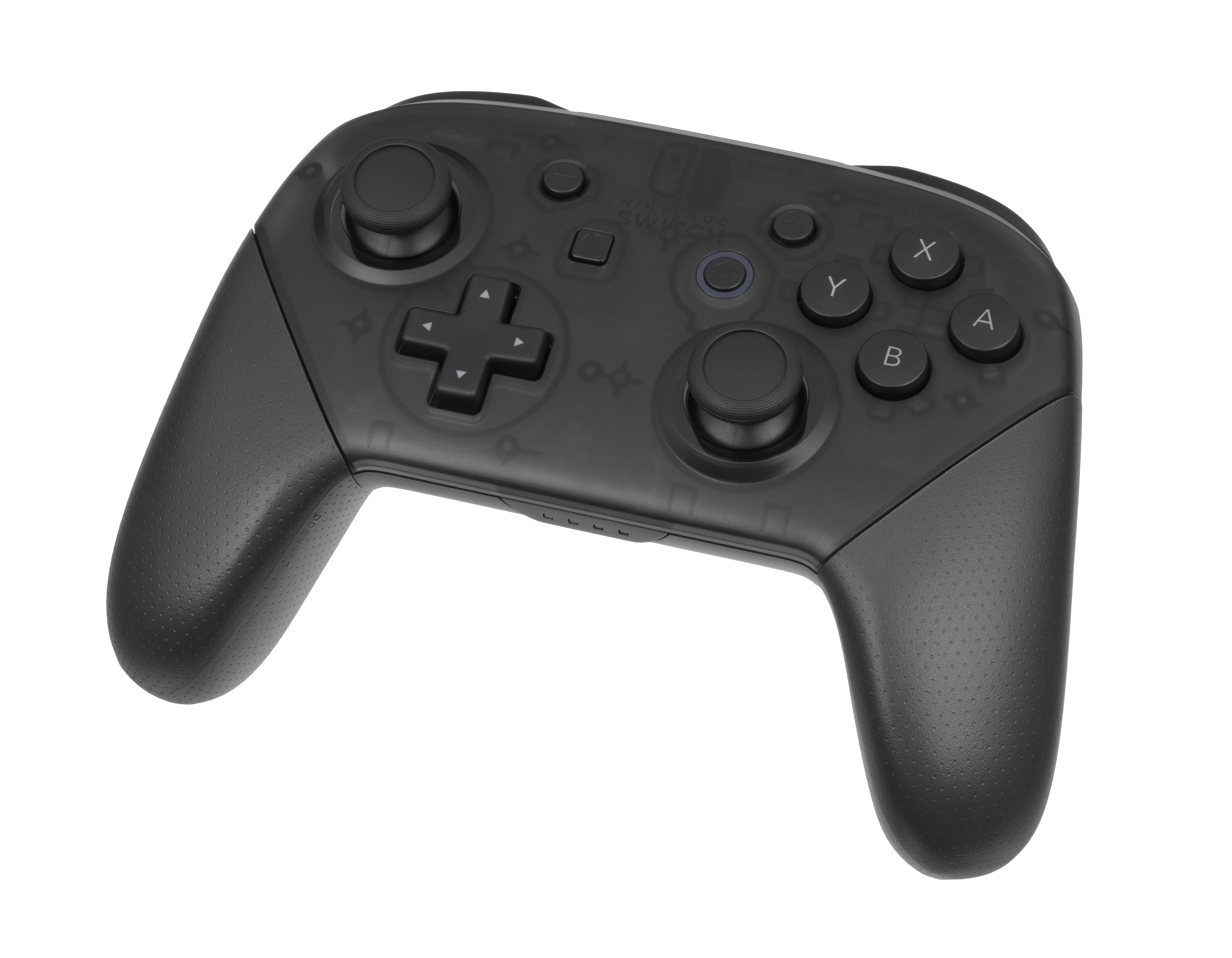
- A standard Nintendo Switch Pro Controller
- Also known as: HAC-013
- Developer: Nintendo PTD
- Type: Gamepad
- Released: March 3, 2017
- Lifespan: 2017–present
- Discontinued: EU: February 2027
- Input: 2 × clickable analog sticks; Accelerometer; Gyroscope; Digital D-pad; 8 × digital face buttons; 2 × digital shoulder buttons; 2 × digital triggers; Sync button
- Connectivity: Bluetooth, NFC, USB-C
- Power: 1,300 mAh, USB-C connector (recharge)
- Predecessor: Wii U Pro Controller
- Successor: Nintendo Switch 2 Pro Controller

The Nintendo Switch Pro Controller (model number: HAC-013) is a game controller developed by Nintendo for use with the Nintendo Switch hybrid console. It serves as an alternative to the Joy-Con controllers. The Nintendo Switch 2 Pro Controller, which features additional buttons, serves as an alternative controller to the Joy-Con 2 controllers of the Nintendo Switch 2.

== History ==
Nintendo unveiled the Nintendo Switch Pro Controller alongside the console on October 20, 2016, and released it on March 3, 2017.

Retailers began stocking a revised version around October 14, 2019, featuring minor component changes and an updated Universal Product Code from 104889D to 104889E. As of 2024, the revision is up to 104889G.

== Design and features ==
The Nintendo Switch Pro Controller features a button layout similar to the Wii's Classic Controller Pro, but uses a staggered analog stick layout reminiscent of the GameCube controller and Xbox controllers. The console supports up to eight Pro Controllers simultaneously. The controller includes near-field communication (NFC) for use with Amiibo toys, HD Rumble, and motion controls. The internal battery (CTR-003)—the same model used in the Nintendo 3DS, 2DS, and Wii U Pro Controller—requires roughly 6 hours to fully charge and lasts for approximately 40 hours.

A USB-C port handles charging via an included USB-C to USB Type-A cable, which connects to the USB-A 2.0 ports on the Switch dock.

The controller's motherboard features a hidden message reading "THX2ALLGAMEFANS!", visible through the translucent plastic surrounding the right analog stick socket. Japanese Twitter user Geo Stream first reported the message on March 4, 2017, one day after the console's launch.

== Support on other devices ==
=== PC and phone support ===
The controller pairs with personal computers for compatible video games; Steam added official configuration support via a beta client update on May 9, 2018. Apple similarly introduced native support for the controller on iPhone and iPad hardware as part of the iOS 16 update.

=== Nintendo Switch 2 support ===
The controller links to the Nintendo Switch 2 console wirelessly or via a wired connection to the Switch 2 dock. It charges directly from the dock using a standard USB-A to USB-C cable. However, it lacks the hardware capability to wake the Switch 2 console from sleep mode.

== Special editions ==
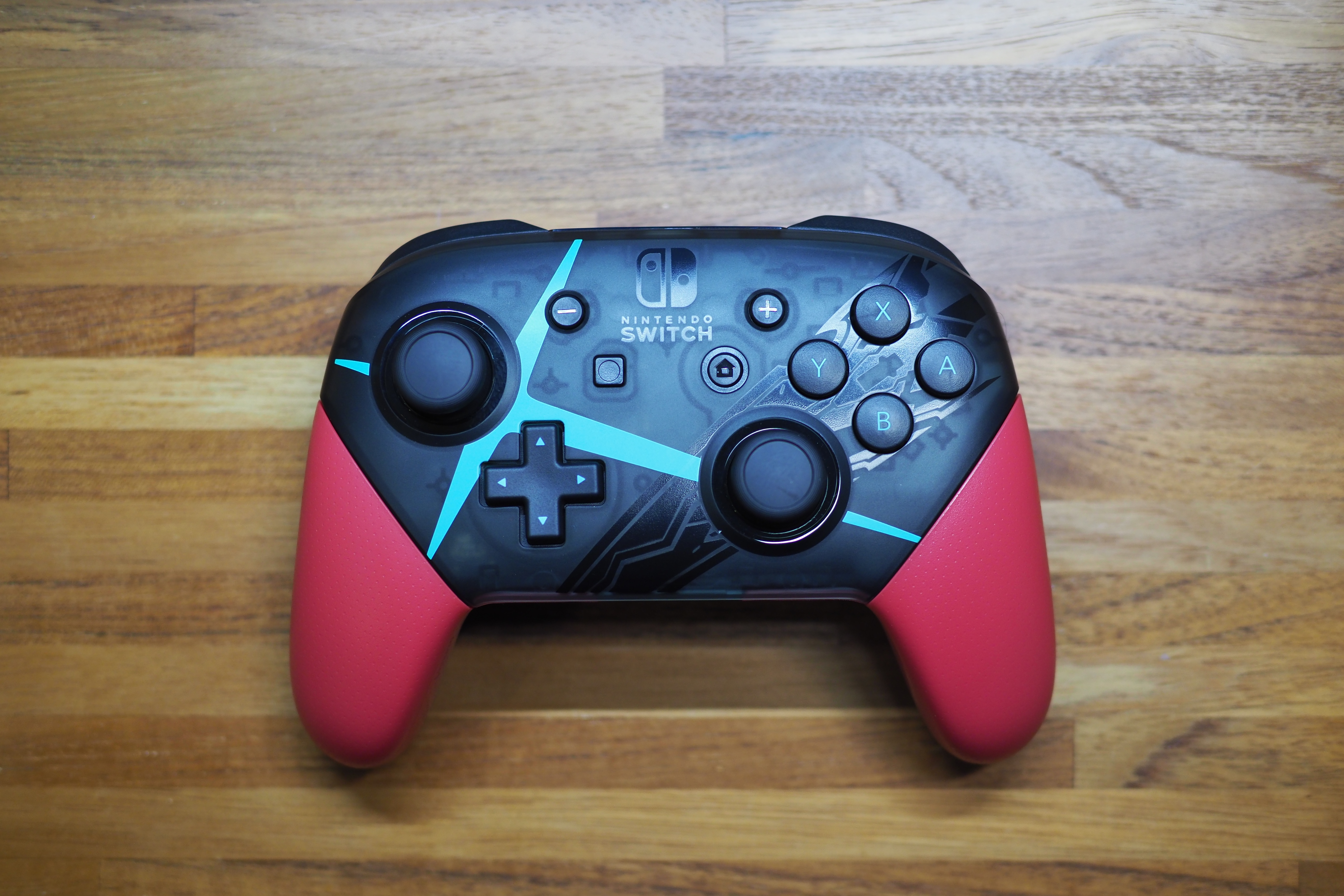
Nintendo Switch Pro Controller Xenoblade Chronicles 2 edition

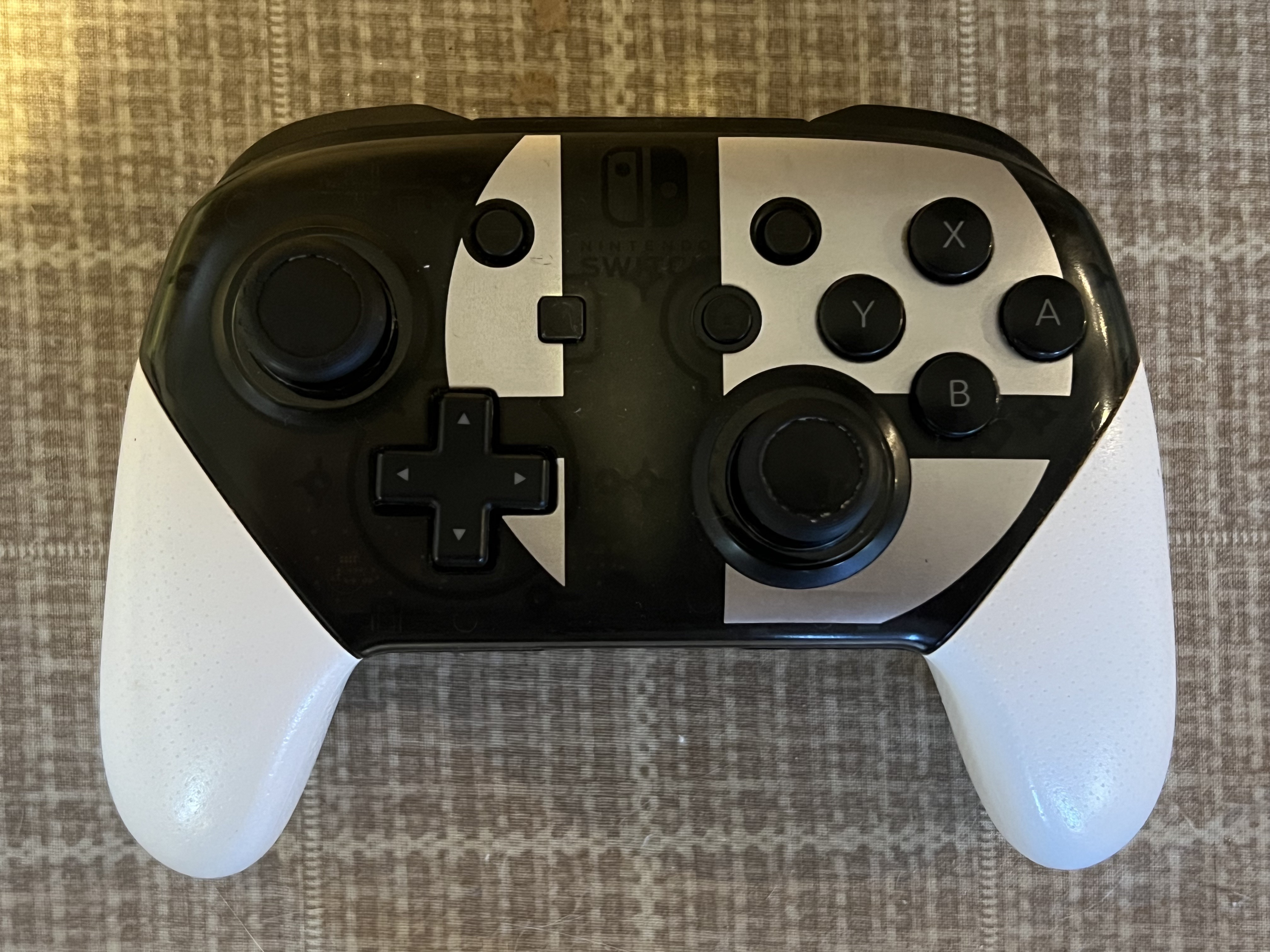
Nintendo Switch Pro Controller Super Smash Bros. Ultimate edition

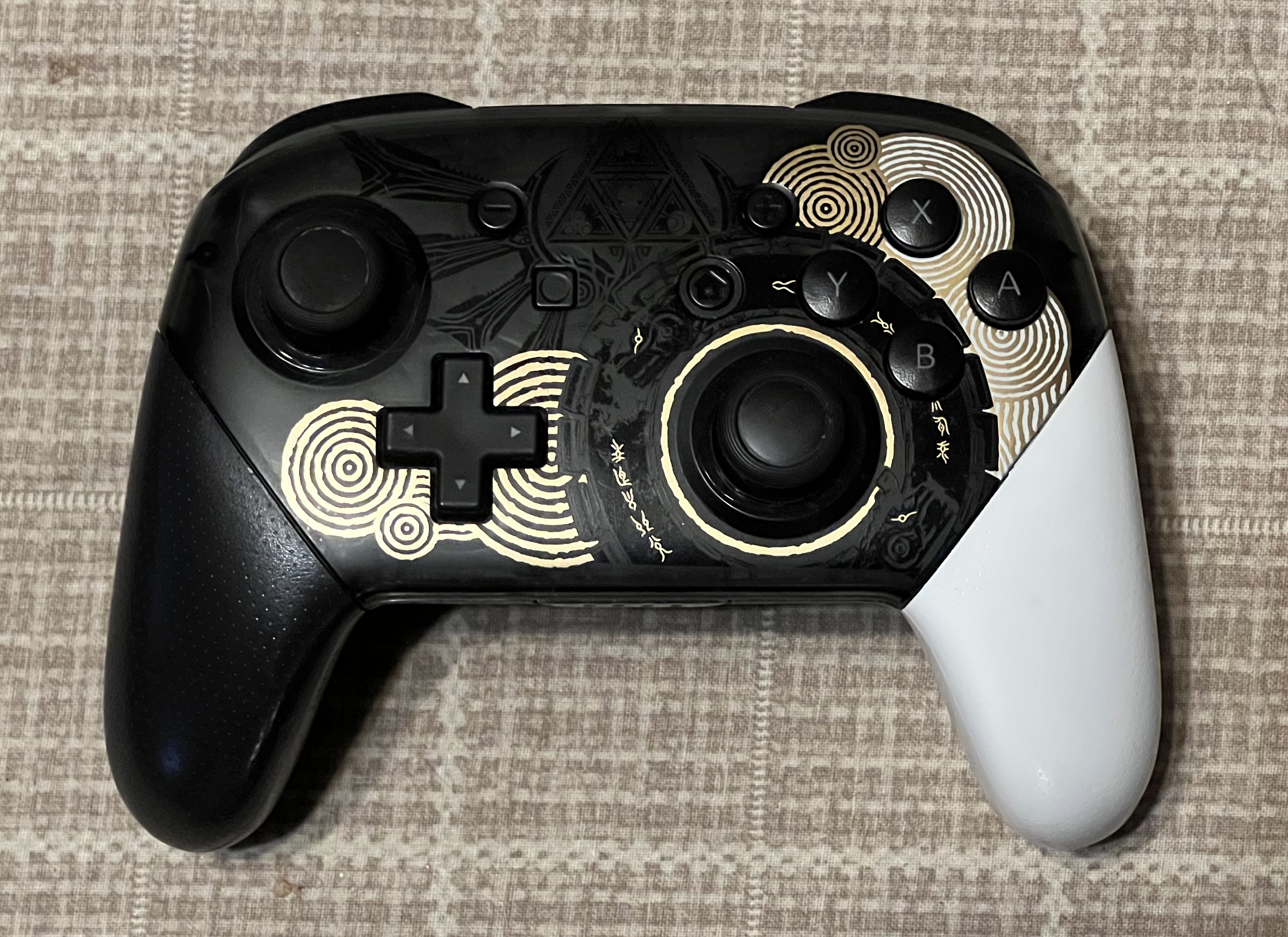
Nintendo Switch Pro Controller The Legend of Zelda: Tears of the Kingdom edition

While the standard controller is available only in black, Nintendo produced several special variations themed around major software releases:

- Splatoon 2 edition: features a green left grip, a pink right grip, and an ink splat pattern across the faceplate
- Xenoblade Chronicles 2 edition: features pink grips and a graphic design inspired by the character Pyra
- Super Smash Bros. Ultimate edition: features white grips and a stylized white Super Smash Bros. insignia
- Monster Hunter Rise edition: features a metallic gold Magnamalo graphic over a black shell
- Monster Hunter Rise: Sunbreak edition: features a metallic silver Malzeno graphic over a black shell
- Splatoon 3 edition: features a blue left grip, a neon yellow right grip, and stylized ink graphics
- The Legend of Zelda: Tears of the Kingdom edition: features a black left grip, a white right grip, gold circular linework, and a black Hylian crest

Special editions have also served as prizes for esports competitions. Winning teams at the PAX East 2019 Inkling Open received a customized Splatoon 2 variant with golden handles. Variants displaying the franchise logo were awarded to the winners of the PAX East 2019 Super Smash Bros. tournament, as well as to Shuto Moriya, the winner of the EVO Japan 2020 Super Smash Bros. Ultimate tournament.

== Reception ==
Outlets including TechRadar and IGN praised the controller's ergonomics, build quality, and battery life, but criticized its high retail cost and shallow digital triggers.

== Nintendo Switch 2 Pro Controller ==
Nintendo Switch 2 Pro Controller
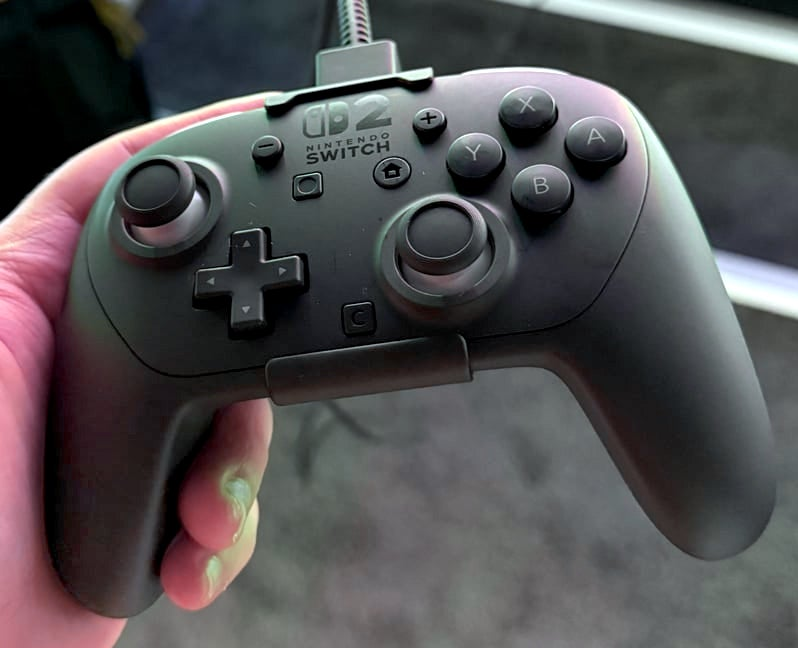
- Developer: Nintendo TDD
- Type: Gamepad
- Released: June 5, 2025
- Lifespan: 2025–present
- Input: 2 × analog sticks; Accelerometer; Gyroscope; Digital D-pad; 10 × digital face buttons; 2 × digital shoulder buttons; 2 × digital triggers; C button; Sync button
- Connectivity: Bluetooth, NFC, USB-C
- Power: 1070 mAh Li-ion battery, USB-C connector (recharge)
- Weight: Approx. 235g
- Predecessor: Nintendo Switch Pro Controller

The Nintendo Switch 2 Pro Controller succeeded the original model for use with the Nintendo Switch 2. Alongside the Joy-Con 2, it introduced "HD Rumble 2" haptics and a new "C" button dedicated to voice and video controls within the integrated GameChat software application. The hardware iteration adds a standard headphone jack on the bottom edge and two remappable "GL" and "GR" rear buttons while maintaining Amiibo compatibility. Though initially announced at $80 in the United States, Nintendo raised the launch price to $85, citing market conditions influenced by manufacturing tariffs enacted during the second Trump administration.

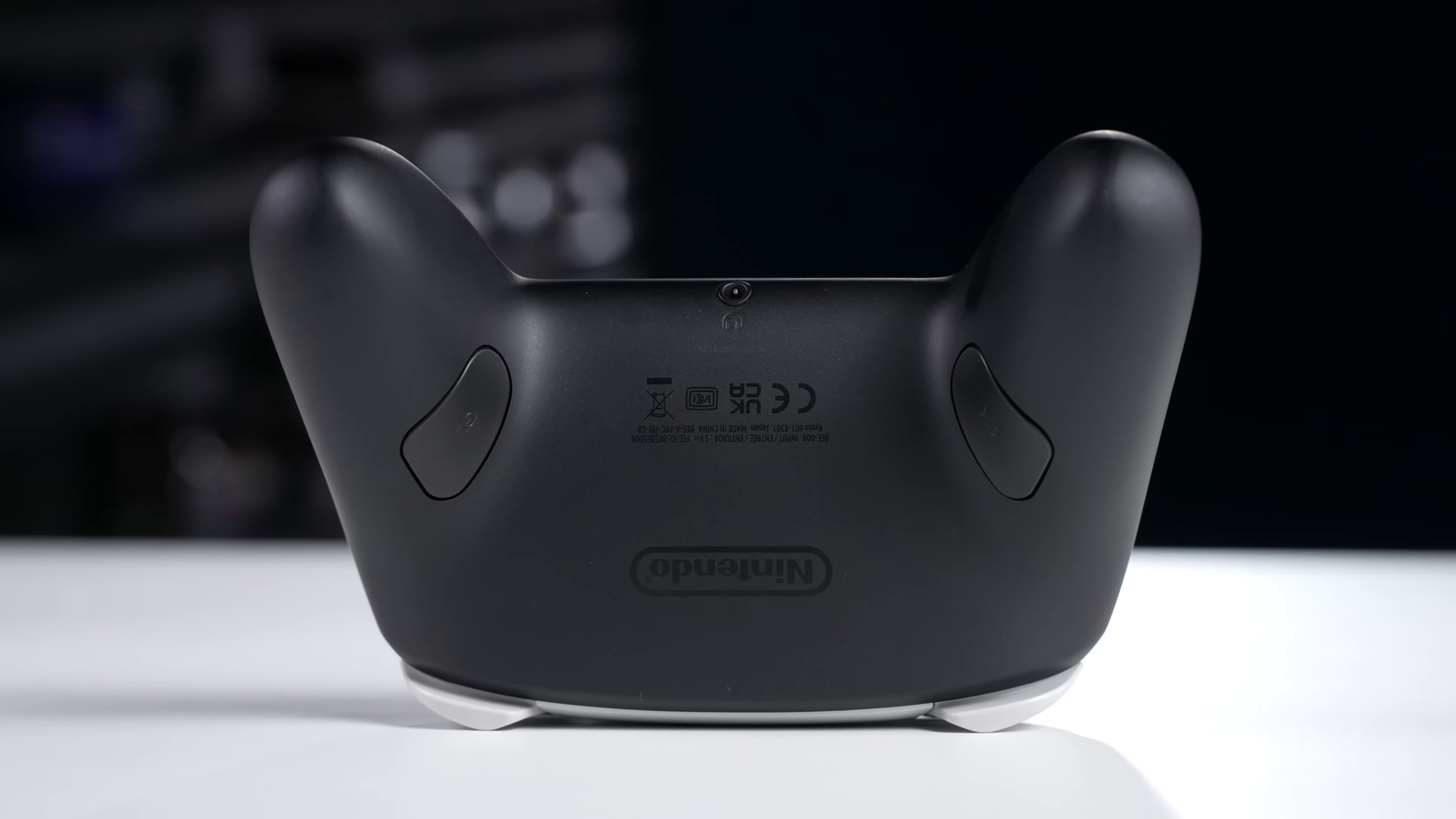
Back side of the Nintendo Switch 2 Pro Controller revealing the new GL and GR buttons as well as the audio jack

Aesthetically, the controller closely mirrors the design and form factor of the original model but swaps the translucent plastic casing for an opaque, solid gray shell. It features white color accents under the analog joysticks and across the upper trigger and shoulder layouts, contrasting with the black components used on the predecessor.

=== Special editions ===
The base version of the Nintendo Switch 2 Pro Controller is only available in black, but special editions of the controller are being released, including:

- Resident Evil Requiem edition: features a gunmetal black shell overlaid with printed newspaper clippings and official game logos
- The Legend of Zelda 40th Anniversary edition: features a golden triangular pattern emblazoned across the controller and the Hylian Crest on the top of the controller's face plate, with the right grip also recolored a dark green to match Link's tunic.

== See also ==
- Classic Controller
- Wii U Pro Controller
