= N-Control Avenger =

Video game controller attachment

The N-Control Avenger is an attachment for video game controllers. It is a clamshell for the existing Xbox and PlayStation 3 controllers that alters the location of where the player interacts with the face buttons.

== Marketing ==
Prior to release, the Avenger was subject to a public relations debacle. N-Control had collected money from customers for preorders, but was missing the expected arrival window. The company had hired Paul Christoforo, operating under the names Ocean Marketing and Ocean Distribution, to handle marketing of the project, and he handled responses to emails as customers began mounting inquiries about orders. Christoforo's replies to one particular customer compelled the customer to forward the email exchange to several Internet media outlets. Penny Arcade's Mike Krahulik posted a transcript correspondence with Christoforo. The media's response was to roundly criticize Christoforo's approach to customer service, which included vague excuses for delays and belittling the customer. Christoforo was removed from his role in the Avenger's marketing, with N-Control apologizing to customers and assuming control of the marketing itself. N-Control also discounted the cost of PlayStation 3 attachment preorders and donated to Penny Arcade's Child's Play charity. Christoforo still held a number of N-Control's digital assets for a number of months before being compelled to give them up.

== Reception ==
The Avenger received largely positive reviews, specifically appreciating that a player's thumb need not leave the right analog stick to interact with the face buttons. After using the device, Engadget appreciated the functionality and said that it should "not be mistaken for a crapgadget". Gizmodo proclaimed that after an initial learning curve, "you'll see no reason to ever take it off". Other reviewers also noted the learning curve, though they generally felt that reaction time was improved after adapting to the device's layout.
