= Wii U Pro Controller =

Game controller for the Wii U

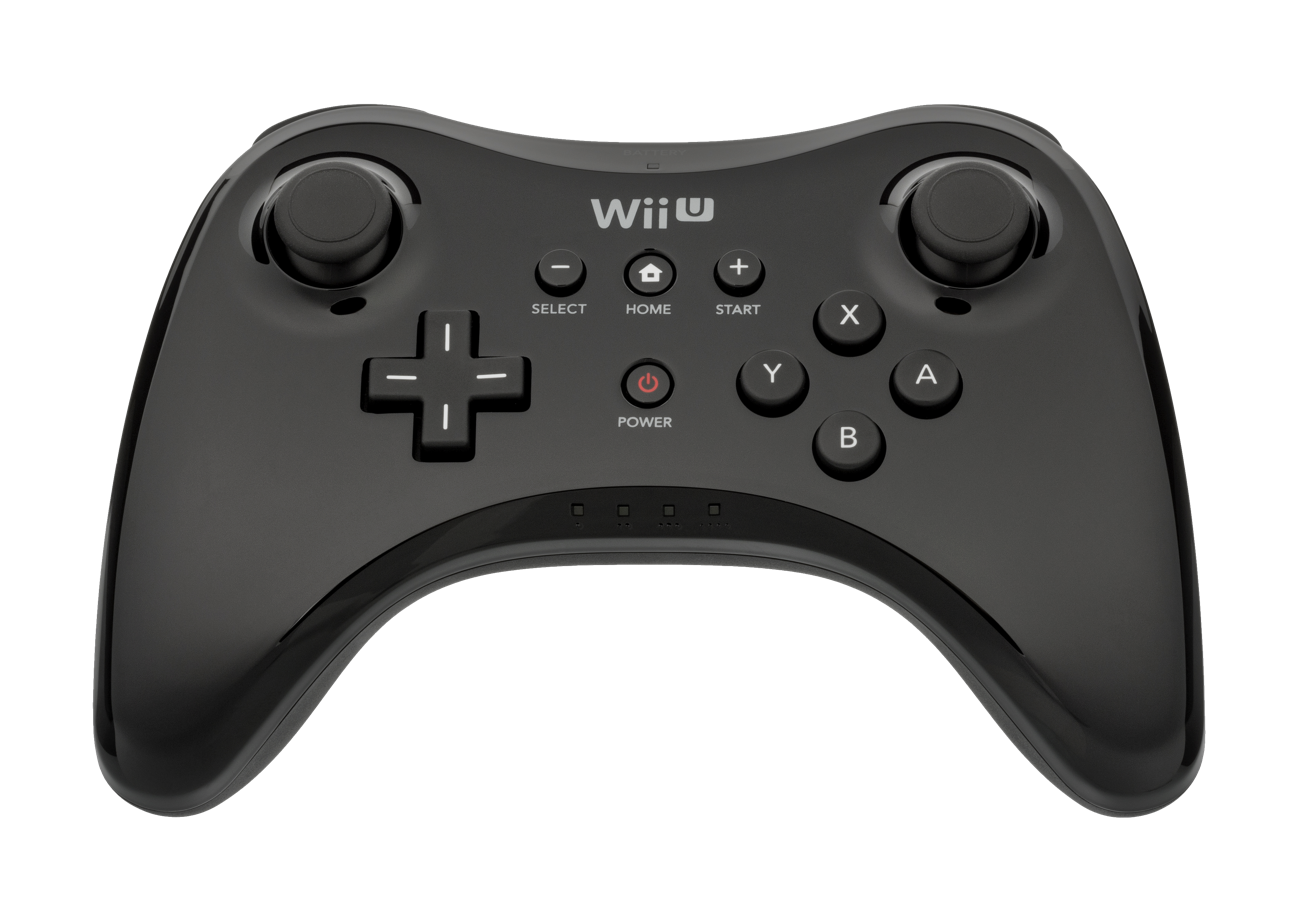
- Wii U Pro Controller in Black
- Manufacturer: Nintendo
- Type: Gamepad
- Generation: Eighth
- Released: November 18, 2012
- Discontinued: Yes
- Input: 2 × clickable analog sticks; Digital D-pad; 8 × digital face buttons; 2 × digital shoulder buttons; 2 × digital triggers
- Connectivity: Bluetooth
- Power: 1300 mAh, Mini USB B connector (recharge)
- Predecessor: Wii Remote (Plus) and Classic Controller (Pro)
- Successor: Nintendo Switch Pro Controller

The Wii U Pro Controller (Wii U PRO コントローラー, Wii U PRO Kontorōrā) is a video game controller produced by Nintendo for the Wii U video game console. It is available in Black and White. It is the successor to the Wii Classic Controller and has the same buttons but with the added features of a power button and pressable analog sticks. In 2013, a year since the Wii U's release, a hacking website Hackaday found a way to use a Wii U Pro Controller and Wii U GamePad on PC.

== History ==
Nintendo unveiled the Wii U Pro Controller at E3 2012. Many video game journalists have noted the similarity between the controller and Microsoft's Xbox 360 Controller. In 2016, a 3rd party controller was released by Hori as a "Pokken Tournament Gamepad".

== Features ==
The controller functions as a secondary controller released for the console, available separately. The Wii U system can be connected to up to four Wii U Pro Controllers at one time, however Super Smash Bros. for Wii U allows the usage of up to 7. It features standard analog sticks (that can now be pressed in) and face buttons. Like the Wii U GamePad and Classic Controller Pro and unlike other eighth generation controllers (i.e., the DualShock 4 and the Xbox One Controller), the triggers are digital (i.e., not analog).

The Wii U Pro Controller uses the same 1300 mAh CTR-003 battery found in the Nintendo 3DS and 2DS, which can last up to 80 hours before needing to be recharged. The charging cable could be plugged into any USB port 5V ~1A.

Nintendo states that the design of the Pro Controller is an "enhanced version" of the Wii's Classic Controller and "offers a richer experience". Certain games with flexible control schemes, such as Call of Duty: Black Ops II and Trine 2: Director's Cut, are also compatible with the Classic Controller. The Wii U Pro Controller is not compatible with previous-generation Wii games.
