= Classic Controller =

Game controller for the Wii by Nintendo

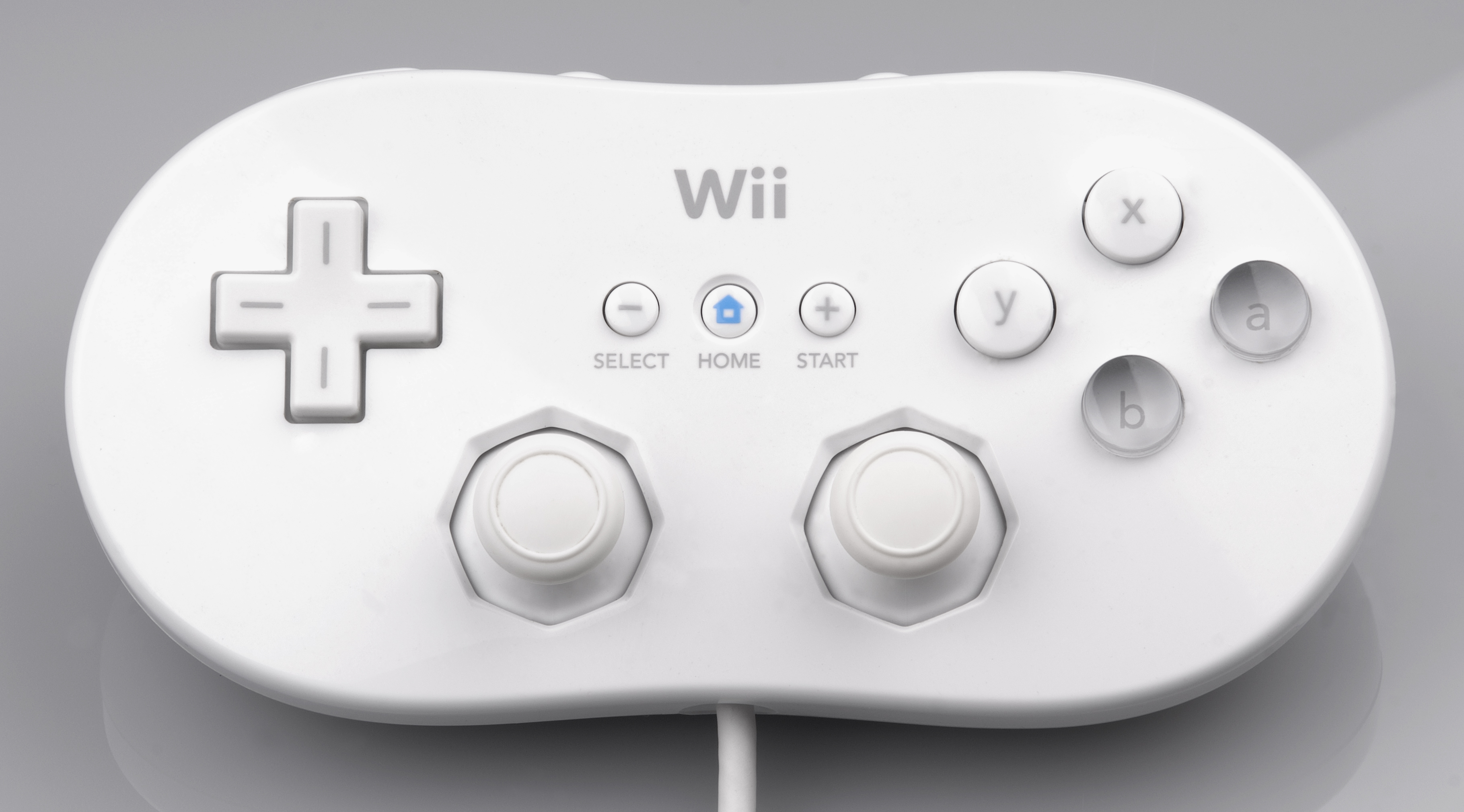
- An original Classic Controller
- Manufacturer: Nintendo
- Type: Gamepad
- Generation: Seventh; Eighth
- Released: Regular; November 19, 2006; Pro; August 1, 2009
- Input: 2 × analog sticks; Digital D-pad; 7 × digital face buttons; 2 × digital shoulder buttons; 2 × analog shoulder buttons (digital on Pro)
- Connectivity: Accessory connector plug
- Predecessor: GameCube controller
- Successor: Wii U Pro Controller

The Classic Controller (クラシックコントローラ, Kurashikku Kontorōra) is a game controller produced by Nintendo for the Wii home video game console. Taking inspiration from Nintendo's own SNES Controller, it was designed to facilitate traditional video game controls on a console that otherwise prioritized the Wii Remote's motion controls. It originally launched with the console in late 2006 and was the intended control option for the Wii's Virtual Console library. The Classic Controller Pro, a revamp inspired by the GameCube Controller, was later released in 2009.

While both models were ultimately succeeded by the Wii U Pro Controller in 2012, they remained supported by key releases on the Wii U, including the Wii U's own Virtual Console library. Nintendo would later discontinue production of the Wii Classic Controller by April 2014, but the controller would prove to be compatible with both the NES Classic Edition and Super NES Classic Edition.

== History ==
When the Wii Remote was first revealed in September 2005, Nintendo announced a controller "shell" which resembled a traditional game controller, often referred to as a "classic-style expansion controller." As described at the time, the Wii Remote would fit inside the shell, allowing gamers to play games using a traditional-style gamepad, while allowing use of the remote's motion sensing capability. According to Satoru Iwata, it would be meant for playing "the existing games, Virtual Console games, and multi-platform games." Early demos of the Wii's capabilities, showed two players competing in what appears to be Wii Sports with one player using a Classic Controller and another using two Wii Remotes, though this cross functionality was dropped.

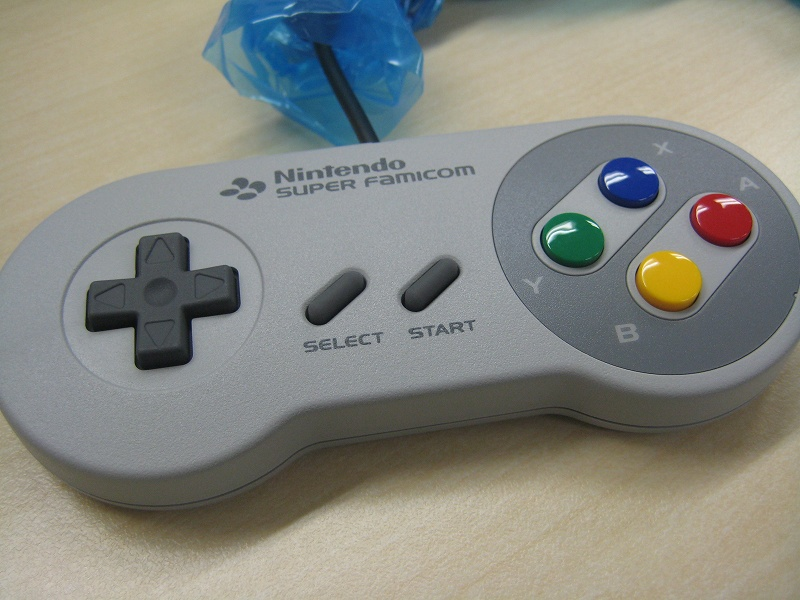
Super Famicom Classic Controller

During E3 2006, Nintendo introduced the Classic Controller (model number RVL-005), which, rather than housing the remote, instead plugs into it via a cord, in a similar fashion as the Nunchuk. It contains two analog sticks and two extra shoulder buttons: the ZL and ZR buttons. The overall configuration resembles a Super Famicom/Super NES controller with feature parity akin to a GameCube Controller. In November 2007, Nintendo offered a special Super Famicom Classic Controller as free gift option for 2007 Japanese Club Nintendo platinum members. In 2010, a similar SNES Classic Controller was made available on Europe's and Australia's Club Nintendo service.

The Wii U Pro Controller has been developed for the Wii U console, the Wii console's successor. Despite the visual similarities, it is incompatible with the Classic Controller; however, instead of or in addition to the Pro Controller, some Wii U games are compatible with the Classic Controller, especially games with flexible control schemes such as Mario Kart 8 and Super Smash Bros. for Wii U. While no Wii games are compatible with the Wii U Pro Controller because the Wii is a prior-generation system, successful efforts have been made to make the controller work on a Wii via homebrew.

== Design ==
The Classic Controller is plugged into the Wii Remote in order to be used. It features two analog sticks, a D-pad, face buttons labeled "a", "b", "x" and "y" (in lowercase), which bears resemblance to a standard SNES controller. Analog shoulder buttons labeled "L" and "R", and two digital "Z" buttons (labeled "ZL" and "ZR") are located more closely to the center axis on their respective sides. It also has a set of "–", "Home" and "+" buttons like those on the Wii Remote, with the "–" and "+" buttons additionally labeled "Select" and "Start", respectively. The body of the Classic Controller measures 6.57 cm (2.59 in) tall, 13.57 cm (5.34 in) wide, and 2.6 cm (1.0 in) thick.

The body of the controller contains slots on the underside, opened via a button at the top of the controller; the function of the slots was never officially clarified, although third-party gaming accessory manufacturer Nyko released a clip that snaps onto the slots and secures the Wii Remote upright behind the Classic Controller, provided that the safety jacket is removed. In addition to a grip shell, the clip contains storage for the controller's three foot cable. While the only color available for the Classic Controller in most markets was white, a limited edition teal and gray version was released in tandem with Monster Hunter G in Japan in 2009, and in 2010, Sonic Colors was bundled with a blue version in Australia.

== Uses ==
The Classic Controller can be used with the Virtual Console as well as with certain Wii and WiiWare games. Along with the Nintendo GameCube controller, the Classic Controller is one of the controllers required to play certain Virtual Console games, such as SNES or Nintendo 64 titles, which require more buttons (and an analog stick in the case of the Nintendo 64 games) than the Wii Remote. However, the Classic Controller cannot be used to play GameCube games. When in the Wii Menu, the left analog stick takes control of the cursor when the Wii Remote is not pointed at the screen. The Classic Controller can navigate through the Message Board, settings menus, and Wii Shop Channel, but becomes inactive on all other channels except for the YouTube channel which the directional button is the only way to navigate through YouTube (except for using keyboard). While the Classic Controller is used, the Wii Remote it is connected to can still be used by another player, which can allow certain Wii games like Bust-A-Move Bash and SpeedZone to support up to eight players in multiplayer mode, with two players sharing one of the maximum four Wii controllers that can be linked to the console at once. As the Wii U supports Wii Remotes, this controller is also compatible with that console, and some Wii U-specific games support it as well, such as Trine 2: Director's Cut. The Classic Controller can also be used to navigate the Wii U home screen and menus.

== Other versions ==
=== Classic Controller Pro ===
Classic Controller Pro
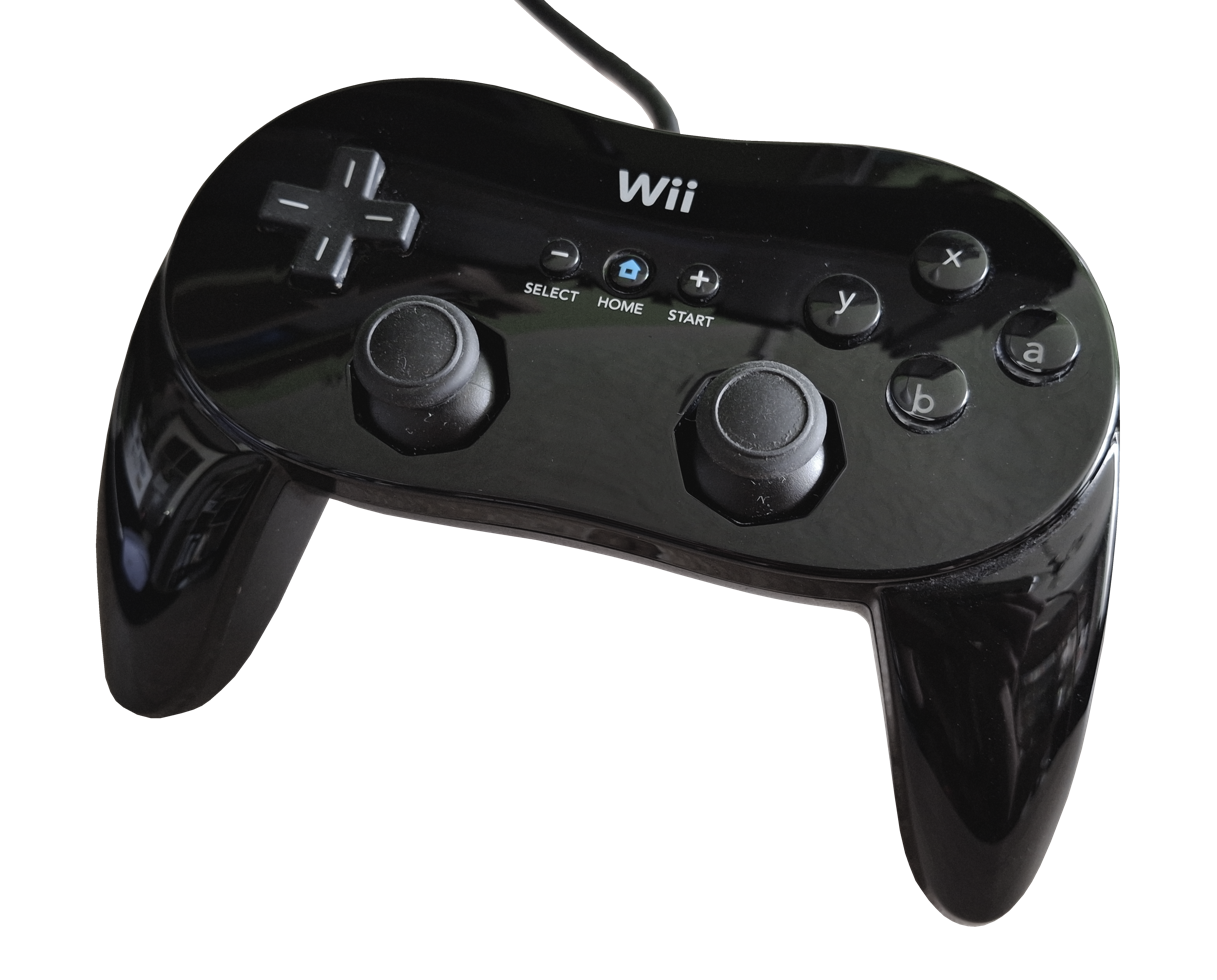
- A black Classic Controller Pro
- Manufacturer: Nintendo
- Type: Gamepad
- Generation: Seventh generation Eighth generation
- Connectivity: Accessory connector plug

In early 2009, Nintendo announced the Classic Controller Pro which functions the same as the original Classic Controller with the exception of the shoulder buttons, which are now digital trigger-shaped buttons arranged vertically rather than horizontally. Instead of a SNES controller, this one is shaped more like a GameCube controller, and has an overall layout almost identical to Sony's DualShock series of controllers for PlayStation consoles. Physical changes include the ZL and ZR buttons, which are now full shoulder buttons, the addition of grips underneath the controller for additional stability, and analog sticks which are spaced farther apart than the original. The cord is positioned on top of the controller rather than the bottom, and the spring-loaded attachment slot underneath the original model was removed. The Pro version was first released in Japan in August 2009 in white and black versions. It was subsequently released in Europe and North America in November 2009 and April 2010, respectively (though only in black in Europe). The black version was available bundled with Monster Hunter Tri, Pro Evolution Soccer 2010, and SD Gundam Gashapon Wars.

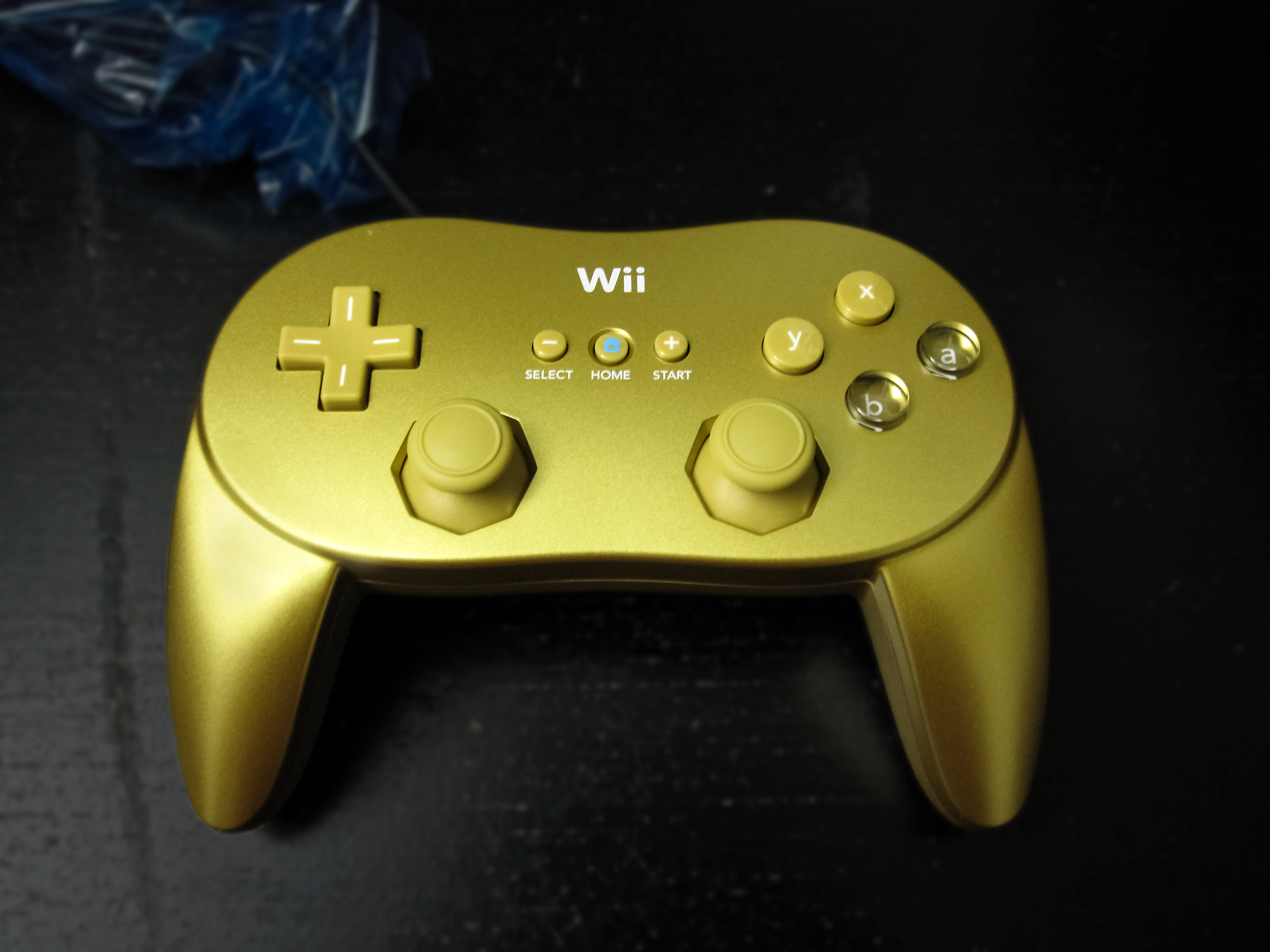
Copies of Goldeneye 007 Classic Edition were bundled with a limited edition gold-colored Classic Controller Pro.

In addition to the standard colors, a black version with gold-colored artwork on the face was available bundled with Samurai Warriors 3 in Japan, and a completely gold-colored version was available bundled in the GoldenEye 007 Classic Edition, and in Japan as a Club Nintendo reward. A red version was packed with limited copies of Xenoblade Chronicles in Europe, and was eventually released separately in Europe as well.

The L and R shoulder buttons are also no longer analog as they were on the original Classic Controller.

=== Wii U Fight Pad controller ===
Accessory maker PDP began releasing a line of officially licensed "Wired Fight Pad" controllers in 2014. Behaving identically to standard Classic Controller Pro models, they are based on the design and layout of the GameCube controller, but with the "+", "-", "Home", and dual shoulder buttons that the GameCube controller lacks. On launch, they were released in Super Mario themed variants, including Mario, Peach, Luigi and Yoshi-colored versions. Four more variants, featuring Donkey Kong, Link, Samus, and Wario themes were released in February 2015, followed by Metal Mario, as well as Toad and Zero Suit Samus as GameStop exclusives.

=== "Classic Edition" controllers ===
In July 2016, Nintendo announced the miniature NES Classic Edition, packaged with one controller based on the original NES controller. Later in June 2017, Nintendo announced the miniature Super NES Classic Edition, packaged with two controllers based on the original SNES controllers depending on the region. Like the Super Famicom Classic Controller released by Club Nintendo, both controllers feature a connector similar to Nunchuks and Classic Controllers.

The controllers for the NES Classic Edition and Super NES Classic Edition can be plugged into their respective consoles. They are also compatible with the Wii and Wii U, as the controllers are recognized as Classic Controllers when plugged into a Wii Remote, which can be used to play Virtual Console games on Wii and Wii U. While the controllers are also technically compatible with Wii and Wii U games that support the Classic Controller, it can be difficult or impossible to properly play certain games with these particular controllers because of the simple, primitive button layouts of the NES and SNES controllers they represent, with both controllers lacking the Classic Controller's analog sticks, the Z shoulder buttons and the HOME button, and the NES controller lacking the SNES controller's shoulder buttons and two extra face buttons. With the case of certain Virtual Console titles on Wii U, you can change button mappings to your preference.

== Legal issues ==
Anascape Ltd filed a lawsuit against Nintendo claiming that the Classic Controller and other Nintendo devices violated Anascape's "six degrees of freedom" interface device patent. In July 2008, the court ruled in favor of Anascape. Nintendo was ordered to stop selling the Classic Controller in the United States until further notice. Nintendo exercised the right to continue selling the Classic Controller pending a verdict at the U.S. Court of Appeals for the Federal Circuit. On April 13, 2010, Nintendo won the appeal, and the previous court decision was reversed.

== See also ==
- GameCube controller
