= Gamepad =

Type of video game controller

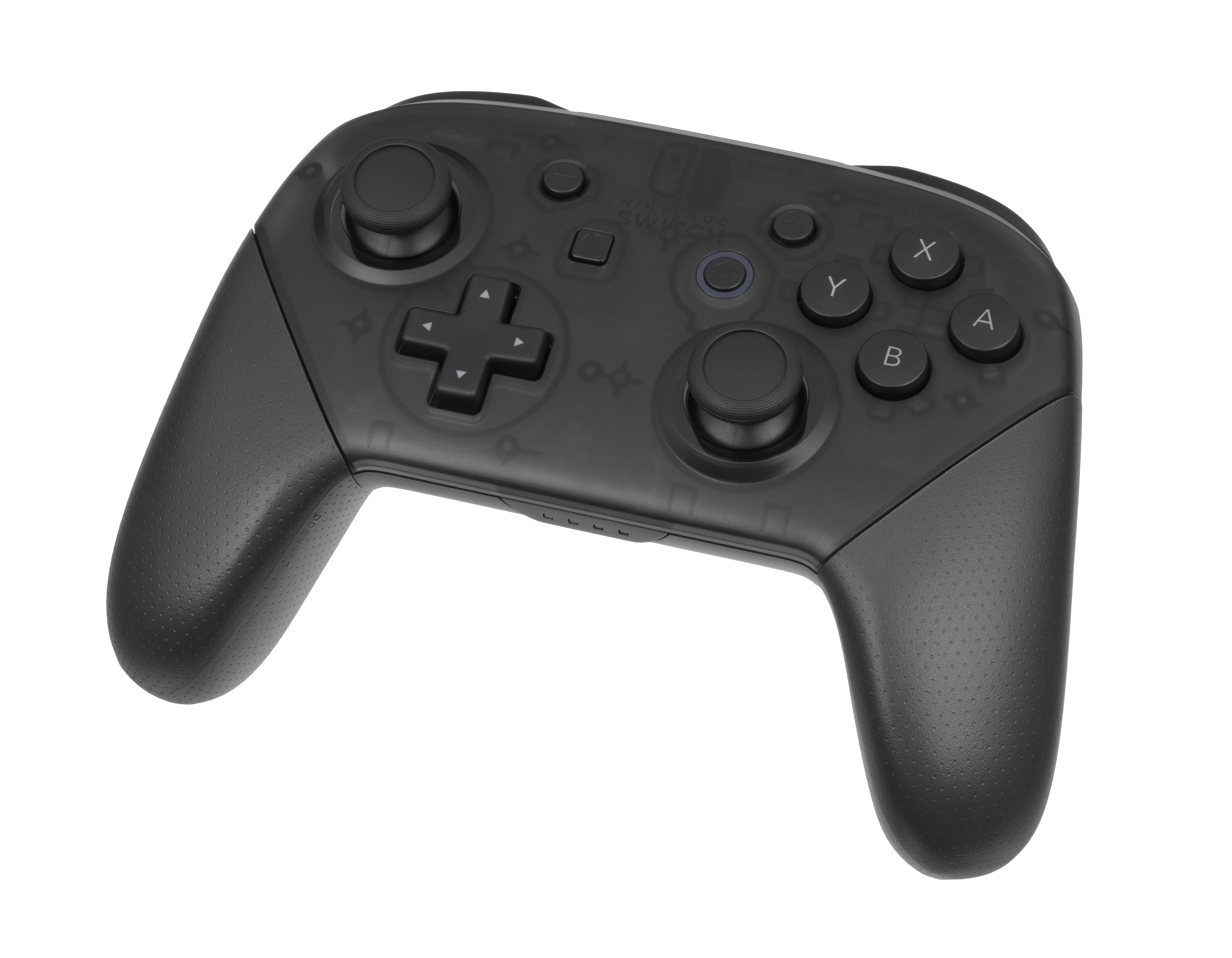
A Nintendo Switch Pro Controller, a typical modern gamepad

A gamepad is a type of video game controller held in two hands, where the fingers (especially thumbs) are used to provide input. Typically the primary input device for video game consoles, gamepads feature a set of buttons and often one or more omnidirectional control sticks.

First appearing in the early 1960s with custom devices for games like Spacewar!, the gamepad rose to mass-market prominence during the third generation of video game consoles with the introduction of the NES controller and its iconic D-pad. Since then, the design has undergone continued refinements, including the addition of shoulder buttons, analog triggers, and haptic feedback. While primarily designed for consoles, modern gamepads are also widely used on personal computers and have occasionally been adapted for non-gaming purposes, such as controlling military equipment or submersibles.

== Features ==
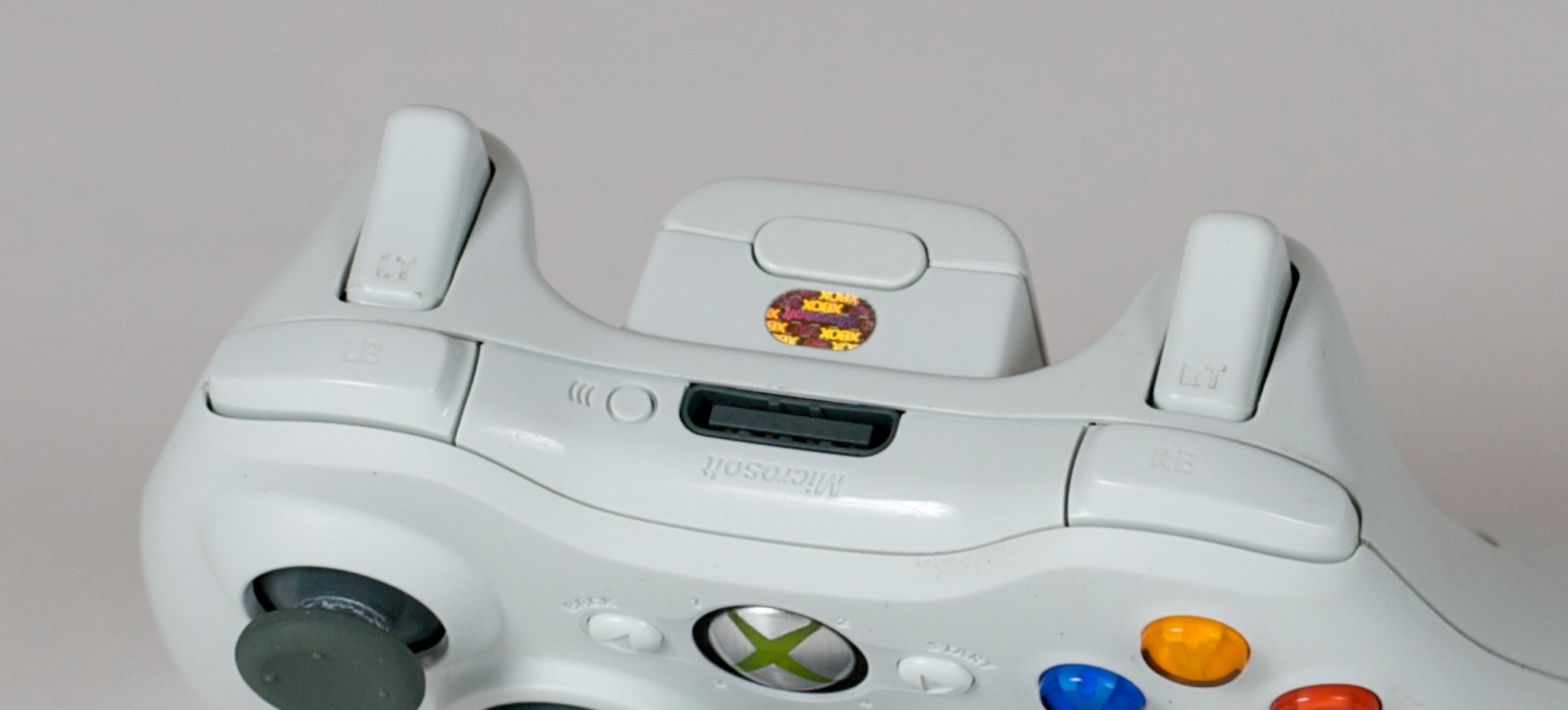
Shoulder buttons ("bumpers") and triggers on an Xbox 360 controller

Some common additions to the standard pad include shoulder buttons (also called "bumpers") and triggers placed along the edges of the pad (shoulder buttons are usually digital, i.e. merely on/off; while triggers are usually analog); centrally placed start, select, and home buttons, and an internal motor to provide force feedback. Analog triggers, like that of the GameCube controller, are pressure-sensitive and games can read in the amount of pressure applied to one to control the intensity of a certain action, such as how forceful water is to be sprayed in Super Mario Sunshine.

There are programmable joysticks that can emulate keyboard input. Generally they have been made to circumvent the lack of joystick support in some computer games, e.g. the Belkin Nostromo SpeedPad n52. There are several programs that emulate keyboard and mouse input with a gamepad such as the free and open-source cross-platform software antimicro, Enjoy2, or proprietary commercial solutions such as JoyToKey, Xpadder, and Pinnacle Game Profiler.

One common issue with modern game controllers is stick drift, where the analog stick registers movement even when not being touched. This problem can affect gameplay accuracy and responsiveness. Stick drift is a common technical issue in modern analog sticks where movement is registered without user input. This phenomenon has led to the development of diagnostic software and web-based tools that visualize input accuracy. Such tools are used to identify the need for hardware maintenance or recalibration.

== History ==
The 1962 video game Spacewar! initially used toggle switches built into the computer readout display to control the game. These switches were awkward and uncomfortable to use, so Alan Kotok and Bob Saunders built and wired in a detached control device for the game. This device has been called the earliest gamepad.

=== Entry into the mass market ===
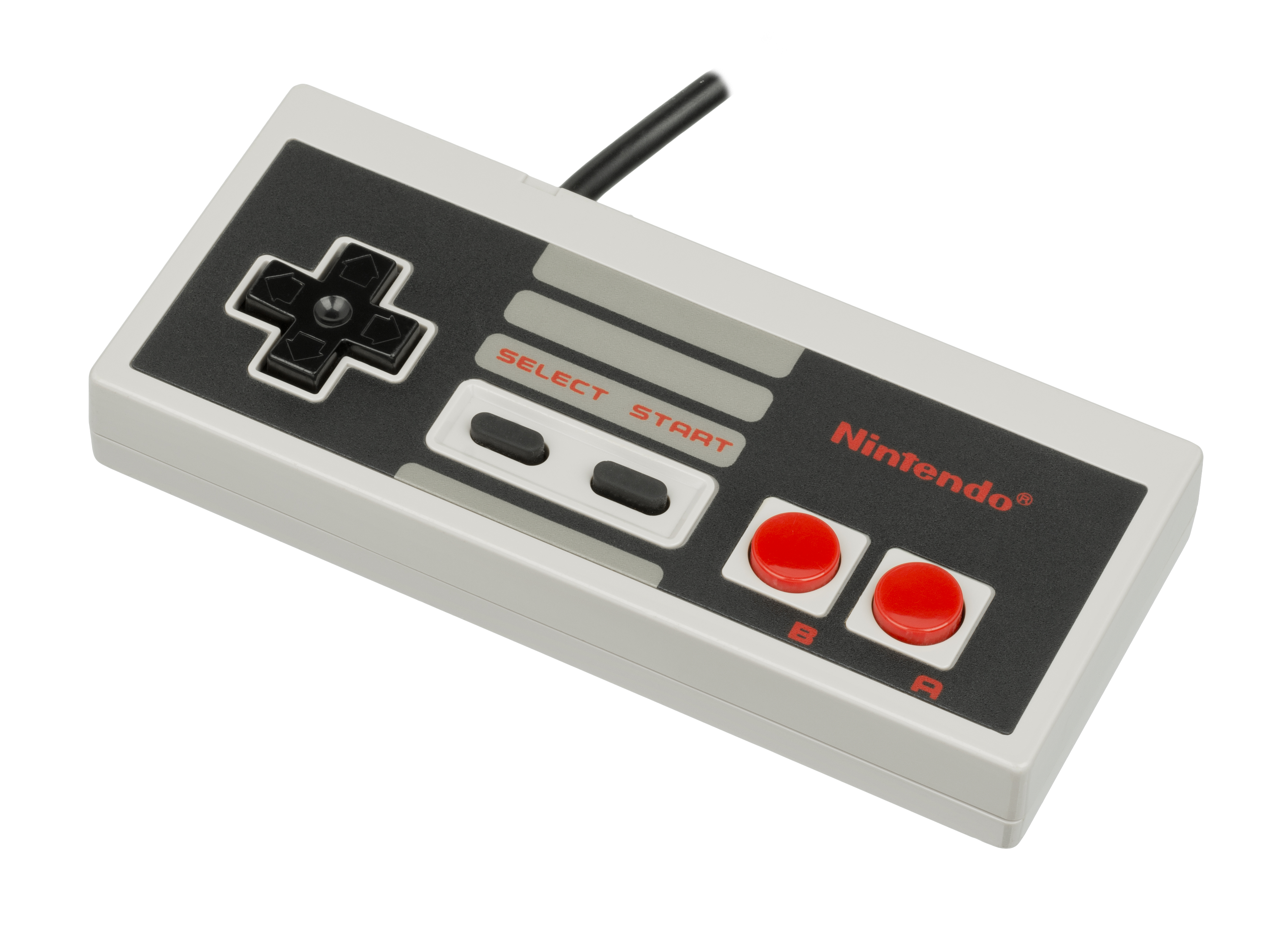
The NES controller

It would take many years for the gamepad to rise to prominence, as during the 1970s and the early 1980s joysticks and paddles were the dominant video game controllers, though several Atari joystick port-compatible pushbutton controllers were also available.

Nintendo developed a gamepad device for directional inputs, a D-pad with a "cross" design for their Donkey Kong handheld game. This design would be incorporated into their "Game & Watch" series and console controllers such as the standard NES controller. Though developed because they were more compact than joysticks, and thus more appropriate for handheld games, D-pads were soon found by developers to be more comfortable to use than joysticks. The D-pad soon became a ubiquitous element on console gamepads, though to avoid infringing on Nintendo's patent, most controller manufacturers use a cross in a circle shape for the D-pad instead of a simple cross.

=== Continued refinements ===
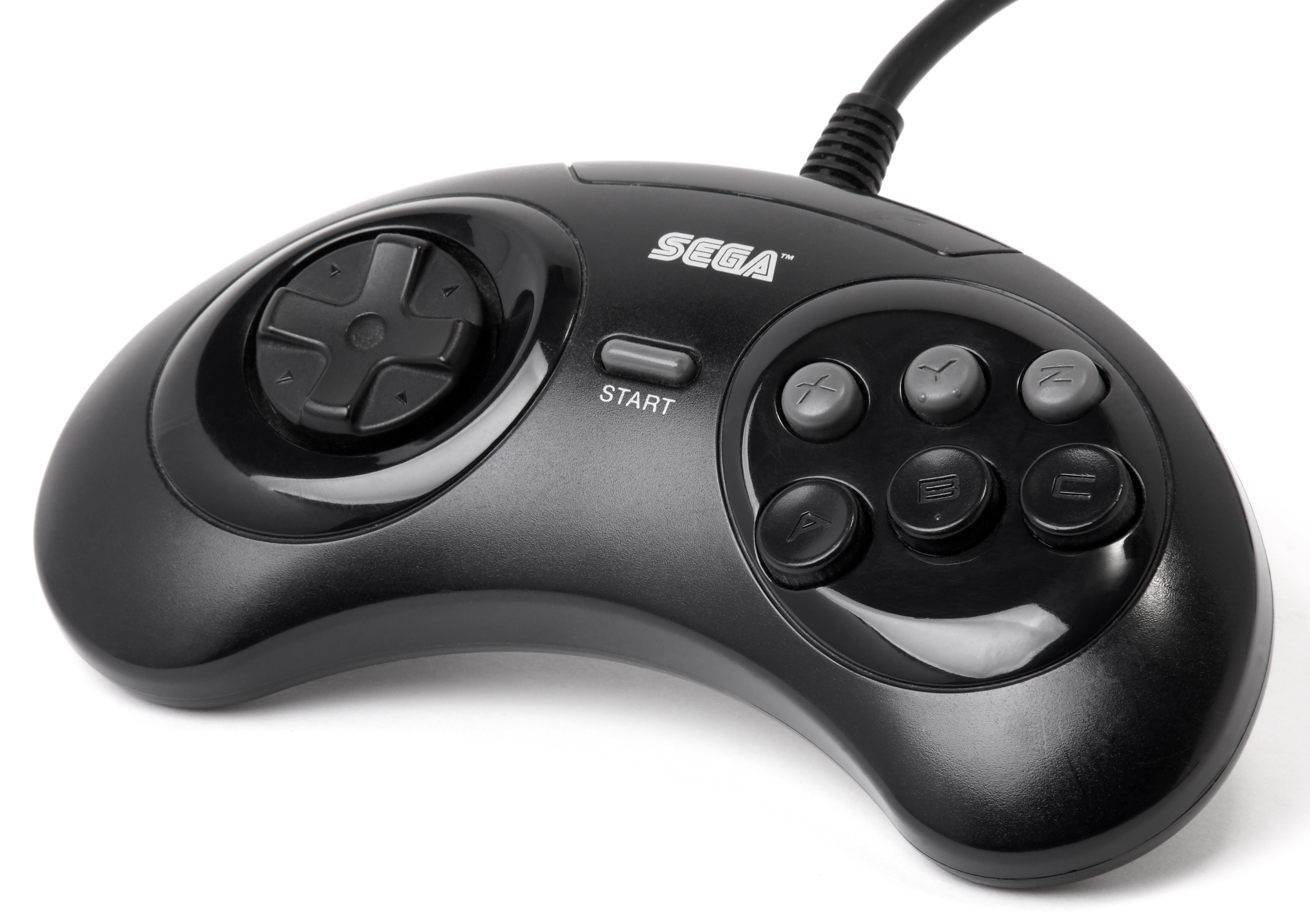
Six-button Genesis/Mega Drive controller that was released later

The original Sega Genesis/Mega Drive control pad has three face buttons, but a six-button pad was later released. The SNES controller also featured six action buttons, with four face buttons arranged in a diamond formation, and two shoulder buttons positioned to be used with the index fingers, a design which has been imitated by most controllers since. The inclusion of six action buttons was influenced by the popularity of the Street Fighter arcade series, which utilized six buttons.

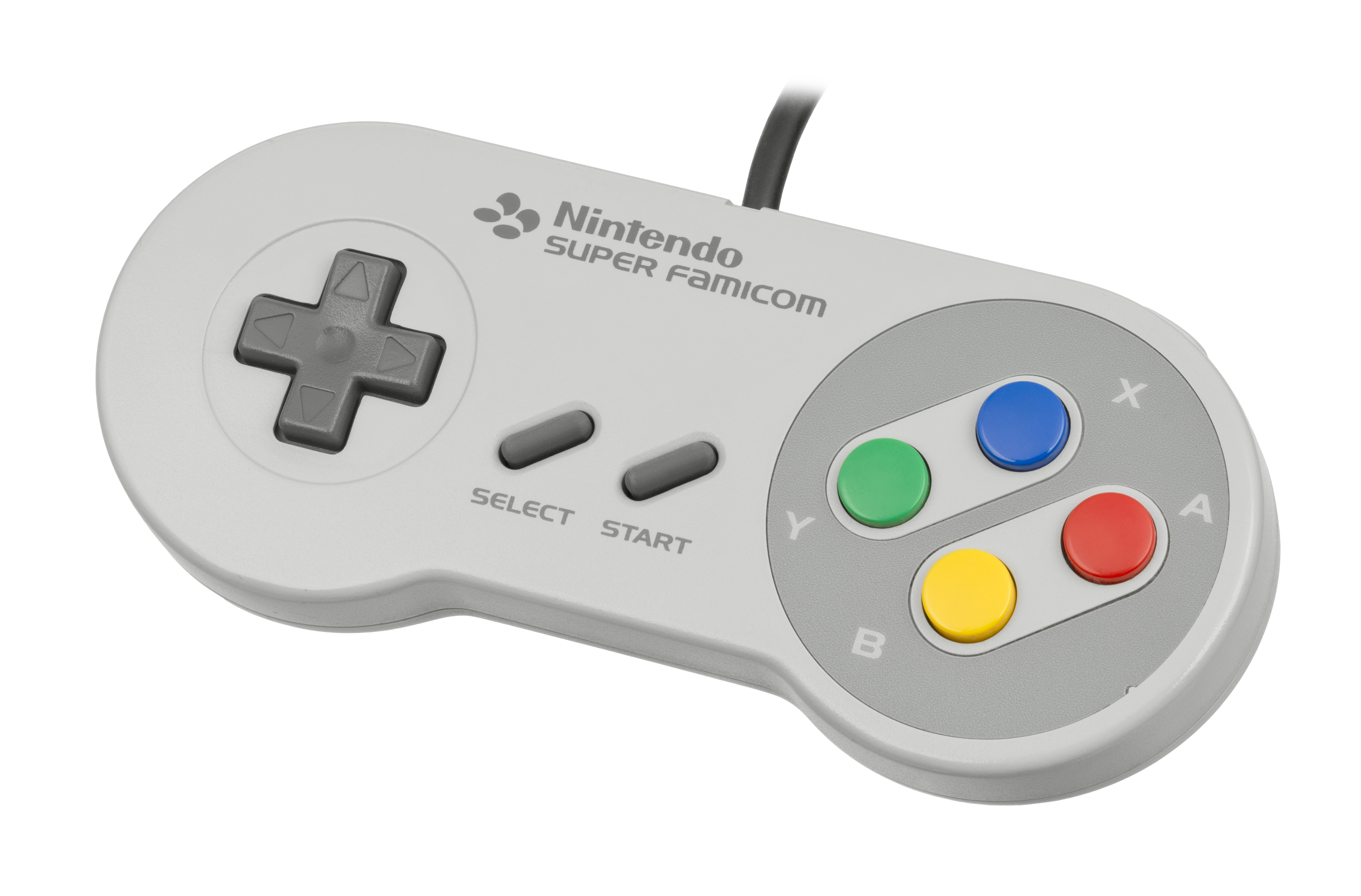
The SNES/Super Famicom gamepad (Japanese Super Famicom version shown), which popularized the layout used by most modern gamepads

For most of the 1980s and early 1990s, analog joysticks were the predominant form of gaming controller for PCs, while console gaming controllers were mostly digital. This changed in 1996 when all three major consoles introduced an optional analog control. The Sony Dual Analog Controller had twin convex analog thumbsticks, the Sega Saturn 3D Control Pad had a single analog thumbstick, and the Nintendo 64 controller combined digital and analog controllers in a single body, starting a trend to have both an analog stick and a d-pad.

Despite these changes, gamepads essentially continued to follow the template set by the NES controller (a horizontally-oriented controller with two or more action buttons positioned for use with the right thumb, and a directional pad positioned for use with the left thumb).

=== Three-dimensional control ===
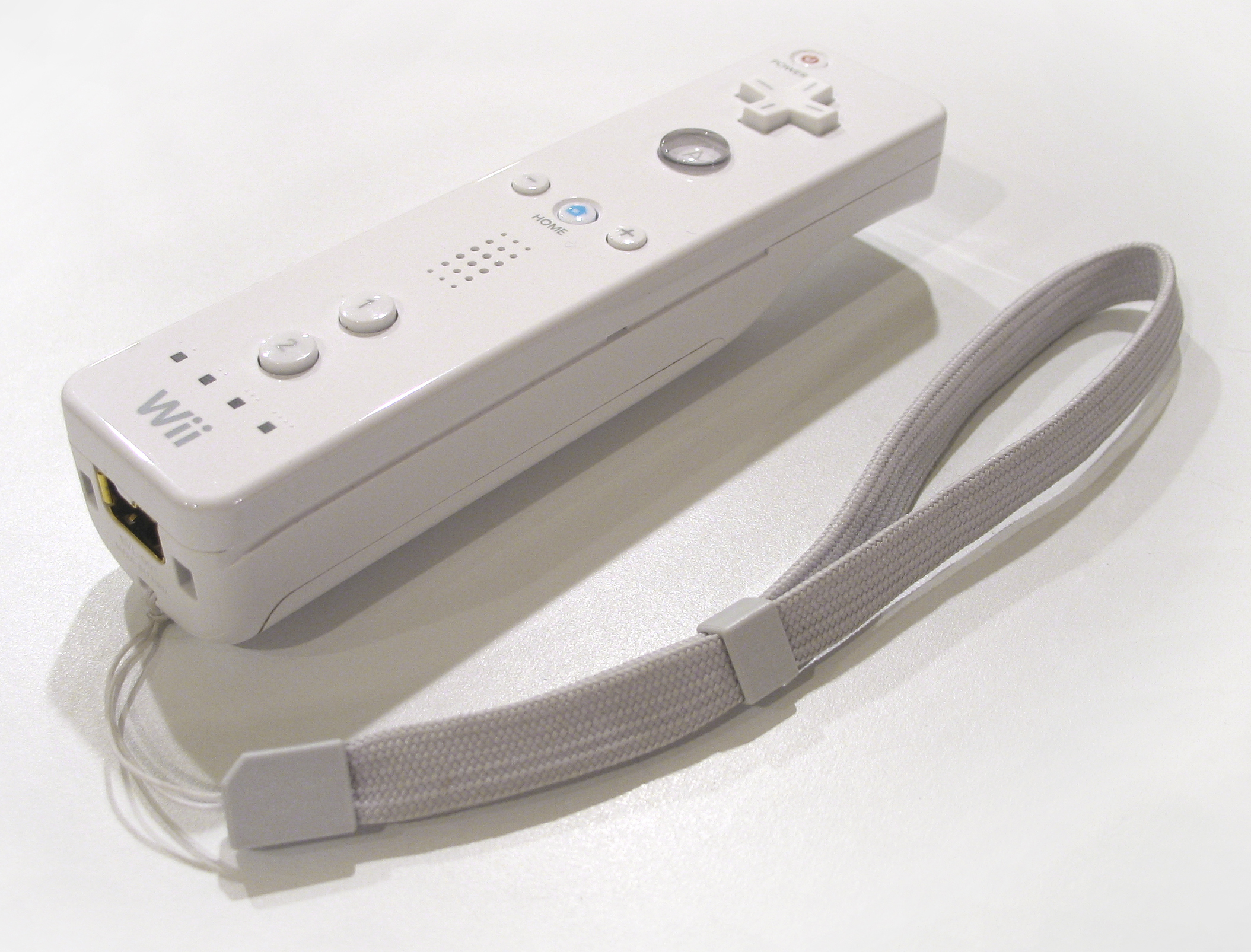
The Wii Remote can also be played by holding it sideways with two hands like a conventional gamepad controller.

Though three-dimensional games rose to prominence in the mid-1990s, controllers continued to mostly operate on two-dimensional principles. Players would have to hold down a button to change the axes along which the controls operate rather than being able to control movement along all three axes at once. One of the first gaming consoles, the Fairchild Channel F, did have a controller which provided six degrees of freedom, but the processing limitations of the console itself prevented there from being any software to take advantage of this ability. In 1994, Logitech introduced the CyberMan, the first practical six-degrees-of-freedom controller; however, it sold poorly due to its high price, poor build quality, and limited software support. Industry insiders blame the CyberMan's high profile and costly failure for the gaming industry's lack of interest in developing 3D control over the next several years. The Wii Remote is shaped like a television remote control and contains tilt sensors and three-dimensional pointing which the system uses to understand all directions of movement and rotation (back and forth around the pitch, roll, and yaw axes). The controller is also multifunctional and has an expansion port which can be used for a variety of peripherals. An analog stick peripheral, called "Nunchuk," also contains an accelerometer but unlike the Wii Remote, it lacks any pointer functionality.

== Grip ==
Gamepads may be gripped differently for better ergonomics or a gaming advantage.

=== Standard grip ===
The standard grip involves operating the trigger buttons with the index fingers, with the thumbs operating both the analog sticks and digital buttons. This grip is common among gamers, but it leaves the thumbs unable to operate the digital buttons while operating the analog sticks, and vice versa, leading to a time consuming alternation.

=== Claw grip ===
The claw grip attempts to alleviate the standard grip's problem of alternation by operating the trigger buttons with the middle fingers, the directional buttons with the index fingers and the analog sticks with the thumbs. This grip may be used exclusively, or with only one hand, with the other hand using the standard grip. The claw grip is named as such because the player's index fingers take the shape of a claw or hook when used.

The claw grip may cause pain or injury due to strain on the index finger. Although the grip is commonly used in certain games, player Nickmercs warned his audience that the claw grip may cause complications in 2019.

== Usage across platforms ==
Gamepads are also available for personal computers. Examples of PC gamepads include the Asus Eee Stick, the Gravis PC, the Microsoft SideWinder and Saitek Cyborg range, and the Steam Controller. Third-party USB adapters and software can be employed to utilize console gamepads on PCs; the Sixaxis, DualShock 3, DualShock 4, DualSense, Wii Remote, Wii U Pro Controller, Joy-Con, Joy-Con 2, Nintendo Switch Pro Controller and Nintendo Switch 2 Pro Controller can be used with third-party software on systems with Bluetooth functionality, with USB additionally usable on Sixaxis, DualShock 3, DualShock 4, DualSense, Nintendo Switch Pro Controller and Nintendo Switch 2 Pro Controller. Xbox 360, Xbox One and Xbox Series X/S controllers are officially supported on Windows with Microsoft-supplied drivers; a dongle can be used to connect them wirelessly, or the controller can be connected directly to the computer over USB (wired versions of Xbox 360 controllers were marketed by Microsoft as PC gamepads, while the Xbox One/Series X/S controllers can be connected to a PC via its Micro USB/USB-C slot).

== Non-gaming use ==
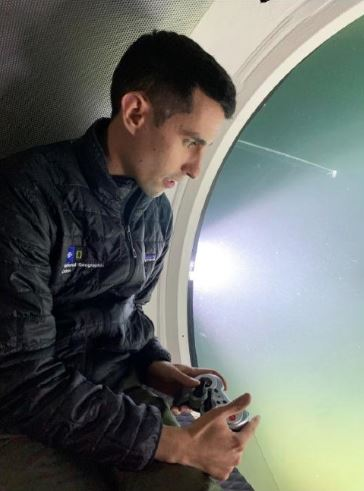
Trent Tresch piloting the OceanGate Cyclops 1 submersible using a modified Logitech F710 Game Controller

Gamepads or devices closely modelled on them are sometimes used for controlling real machinery and vehicles, as they are familiar to users and (in the case of actual gamepads) provide an off-the-shelf solution. The US Army and US Navy use Xbox controllers for operating devices, and the British Army uses a device modelled on gamepads to operate systems on the Challenger 2 main battle tank. The Titan submersible used a gamepad for control.

== See also ==
- Computer keyboard
- Computer mouse
- Game port
- Sim racing wheel
