= Beat Sketcher =

2010 video game

- Japanese cover art
- Developer(s): Japan Studio
- Publisher(s): Sony Computer Entertainment
- Platform(s): PlayStation 3
- Release: JP: October 21, 2010; NA: November 23, 2010; EU: December 1, 2010; AU: February 2, 2011
- Genre(s): Rhythm
- Mode(s): Single-player, multiplayer

Beat Sketcher, known in Japan as Beat Sketch!, is a rhythm game developed by Japan Studio and published by Sony Computer Entertainment for the PlayStation 3. It utilizes the PlayStation Move controller. It was released for retail in Japan on October 21, 2010, and for the PlayStation Network internationally in 2010–2011.

== Reception ==
Reception

Aggregate score
Aggregator	Score
Metacritic	67/100

Review scores
Publication	Score
Eurogamer	6/10
Famitsu	31/40
GamesTM	7/10
GameZone	6/10
Play	85%
PlayStation: The Official Magazine	6/10
Push Square	8/10 stars

The game received "average" reviews according to the review aggregation website Metacritic. In Japan, Famitsu gave it a score of one seven, one nine, one seven, and one eight for a total of 31 out of 40.
