= Shiki-Tei =

2008 video game

- Developer(s): Japan Studio
- Publisher(s): Sony Computer Entertainment
- Platform(s): PlayStation 3
- Release: JP: June 26, 2008
- Genre(s): Gardening Simulation
- Mode(s): Single-player

Shiki-Tei (四季庭, which translates as "Four Seasons Garden") is a 2008 gardening simulator video game developed by Japan Studio and published by Sony Computer Entertainment for the PlayStation 3. It was released only in Japan on the PlayStation Network.

== Gameplay ==
This life simulation game's purpose is to create and maintain a Japanese garden. It has a Photo Mode which allows the player to take in-game screenshots and to share them with players in the online gallery. Custom soundtrack feature is also enabled.

There is a wild life pack with several animals such as a red fox, a chipmunk or a red-crowned crane. Mainichi Issho's Toro is also featured.
