= Surveillance Kanshisha =

2002 video game

- Official Box art of Surveillance Kanshisha released in Japan. The game's Asian release does not include the printed red triangle warning logo on mature content.
- Developer: Sony Computer Entertainment Japan (Note: Additional work and animation by Production I.G..)
- Publisher: Sony Computer Entertainment
- Platform: PlayStation 2
- Release: JP: April 25, 2002
- Genre: Adventure
- Mode: Single-player

Surveillance Kanshisha (Note: Japanese: サーヴィランス監視者, Hepburn: Surveillance Kanshisha; lit. "Surveillance Guardian") is a 2002 adventure video game developed and published by Sony Computer Entertainment for the PlayStation 2. Animated cutscenes was provided by Production I.G. It was not released outside Japan.

It takes place in the 2050s where a United Nations-created special forces unit called Shadow Sword is deployed to protect the Earth-Mars travel route from anti-UN terrorists called Neo Kleit, conducting terrorist attacks to remove the UN's control of the space program. A special public security surveillance network is unveiled for the first time called Project Surveillance, which is used to assist Shadow Sword operatives in their work in apprehending and hunting down the terrorists.

Japanese critics praised the game's animation and use of the gameplay mechanics in telling the story, although it is criticized for little to no involvement of the players themselves.

== Gameplay ==
Gameplay for Surveillance Kanshisha consists of a main screen with six small ones at the bottom, designated as sub monitors in which players will cycle through them to change the main screen feed. At the right side of the screen is a map used to indicate the camera position in the chapter level. On the bottom left is a character screen in which Tim Lawper will communicate with Yusuke Sasaki. In the first chapter as shown, Lawper is teaching Sasaki how to cycle through the sub monitors to change main screen camera feed.

Players play the game by assuming the role of Shadow Sword team leader Yusuke Sasaki, who the player use in monitoring cameras of Project Surveillance at a Shadow Sword surveillance truck in the game's six chapters. There are six sub monitor screens with the main screen above them as players would use the latter to observe and analyze to obtain information for the level to progress, especially for Shadow Sword operators to move around and complete their objectives, by using target cursors to mark the main screen for The Surveillance to examine with a map on the right side of the screen for locating subjects of interest and where cameras connected to Project Surveillance are located. Proper use of the cameras and using correct judgement in locating clues and items would determine the fate of the Shadow Sword tactical teams in terms of progressing in Surveillance. At the start of a chapter, there will be one or two sub monitors that will function, allowing players to use them. But as the chapters progress, some of the sub monitors will not function (e.g. due to terrorists discovering and destroying the cameras) while others will be online after the player is informed that a sub monitor is functioning.

During a session on the announcement of Surveillance at the 15th Anniversary Production I.G World Tour in Ginza, Production I.G commentators have noted that the gameplay challenges players to use the main monitor and the other six submonitors in order to accomplish a scenario.

At the end of each chapter, a chapter report would be presented to show players how well or bad they have done for the particular scenario. According to an interview with the Production I.G staff involved in making Surveillance, they had mentioned that the chapter report would give players the opportunity to check their progress and see what things do they either have to do or to avoid doing in the future.

== Plot ==
The game takes place in the year 2053 when space travel between Earth and Mars is made possible thanks to the UN's goal to conduct space travel. But with the presence of a mysterious terrorist group called Neo Kleit preparing to oppose to the UN's attempt to expand on space travel, a UN-established counter-terrorist unit called Shadow Sword is called in by the International Cosmic Security System or I-COSS to eliminate the group and protect the space development program and civilians with the help of a high-tech computer surveillance system called Project Surveillance.

As Shadow Sword continues to protect civilians in their space travel and hunt down terrorist members of Neo Kleit, the unit gets tangled in a black ops project that involves genetically enhanced creatures with some Shadow Sword operatives killed while trying to find out who was responsible for the project's existence.

=== Characters ===
All of the characters were both created and animated by Production I.G.

The Shadow Sword team was described as being similar to the Policenauts team in Konami's Policenauts.

- Yusuke Sakaki (榊悠輔) (Kenichi Suzuki) is a Japanese Shadow Sword operator and commanding officer of the team. He is a lieutenant colonel and an ex-JGSDF officer who had served in the 1st Airborne Brigade in its 4th Airborne Infantry Battalion. He is in charge of using the Project Surveillance system to direct his comrades in the field.
- Edward Banfield (Yūichi Nagashima), referred to as Ed by his friends, is a British Shadow Sword operator with the rank of major. He's Shadow Sword's lone electronics warfare officer, and he is quite knowledgeable on the use of The Surveillance due to time spent on the system related to his position.

Operatives from Shadow Sword. From left to right: Jim Perkins, Nicholas Gump, Amanda Grace, Edward Banfield, Tim Lawper, Yusuke Sakaki, Ned Hardy, (Unknown), Milliana Isakovich, Steve Hammond, Charlie Hix and Maurice Bilal.

- Maurice Bilal (Nobuo Tobita) is a British Shadow Sword operator with the rank of major. He was trained with the United Kingdom Special Forces on explosive ordnance disposal and serves as the team's demolitions expert.
- Amanda Grace (Junko Noda) is the only female Shadow Sword operator, also experienced in explosive ordnance disposal.
- Nicholas Gump (Takashi Nagasumi), referred to as Nick by his friends, is an American Shadow Sword operator with the rank of lieutenant colonel. He's in charge of the team's logistics.
- Steve Hammond (Yasunori Matsumoto) is an American Shadow Sword operator with the rank of captain. He's the team's trained sniper and had once participated in the Olympic Games, which gives him self-confidence.
- Ned Hardy (Kiyoyuki Yanada) is an American Shadow Sword operator with the rank of lieutenant colonel. He had been formerly under the United States Army Space Aviation Strategic Command Center Department (米国陸軍航空宇宙戦略司令部教育センター, Beikoku rikugun koukuu uchuu senryaku shireibu kyouiku sentaa).
- Charlie Hix (Katsuyuki Konishi) is an American Shadow Sword operator with the rank of major. He has the smallest stature of any of the Shadow Sword operators, which allows him to conduct rappelling without running into any kind of problem.
- Jim Perkins (Hiroyuki Yoshino) is a former United States Air Force Astronaut trainee, who is recruited to Shadow Sword.
- Milliana Isakovich (Eriko Kawasaki) is a Russian Shadow Sword scientist with the rank of lieutenant colonel. She had formerly served in the Russian Ground Forces as its leading scientist and scholar at its gene research academy before she was asked by International Cosmic Security System to serve under Shadow Sword.
- Tim Lawper (Satsuki Yukino) is an American Shadow Sword operator assigned in a non-combat role as adviser and communications specialist to the entire team with the rank of captain. She was with the United States Air Force Advanced Aerial Tactical Training Bureau (米国空軍高度航空戦術教育局, Beikoku kuugun koudo koukuu senjutsu kyouikukyoku) before joining the group.

== Production ==
=== Development ===
Drawings of the Moon Truck used in the game by Junya Ishigaki.

The game's design was created by both Junya Ishigaki and Atsushi Takeuchi with Takashi Watabe and Yasushi Ohara. Hiroyuki Nishimura was the main director of the game with Hidekazu Terakawa being in charge of game design and was one of the game's director.

In an interview with Hidekazu Terakawa (Game Designer/Director), Atsunori Maeshima (Game Director), Tetsuji Yamamoto (Executive Producer, SCE) and Junichi Fujisaku (At the time of interview, Chief Director of Production I.G's Section G - Software Development Section), they had said that the game was entirely created by various staff members from Production I.G alone with little to no involvement from Sony Computer Entertainment, including planning. Maeshima had pointed that during game development, he saw the game in comparison to the Blade Runner movie.

The game's cutscenes, which were in MPEG-2 format, made the team decide to move the platform from the PlayStation to the PlayStation 2 due to issues of the former's loading capabilities as the cutscenes are at least 5 hours and 30 minutes long according to Yamamoto. In addition, they had used real photos of Mars and Phobos as part of the cutscenes.

=== News ===
IGN had first broke news of the possibility of the game based on the Yarudora series. On August 31, 2001, Sony Computer Entertainment made an official announcement that Surveillance Kanshisha would be created for the PlayStation 2 with Production I.G working on the animation for the game.

In the 15th Anniversary Production I.G World Tour 2002 in Ginza on April 20 and April 21, 2002, Surveillance had been unveiled by Production I.G with guests including Mamoru Oshii when the game was announced for a 2002 release.

=== Promotion ===
Official promotional Surveillance Kanshisha poster.

A movie clip was shown on the internet for free from April 25 to May 14, 2002, to promote the game to the public from the website of Morrich Club, now a part of Sony Music Online Japan. A Surveillance commercial had aired on SKY PerfecTV! on April 29, 2002, and on TV Tokyo on August 29, 2002.

== Media ==
A Surveillance Guidebook was released out to the public on May 10, 2002, and was published under Kadokawa Shoten and sold for ¥1,575. The book included information ranging from the story of the game to the production of the game, including pictures of CG graphics used by Production I.G.

== Reception ==
A review of the game on Dengeki Online had praised the game for the story and the cutscenes that were done by Production I.G, though it criticizes it for having little to no involvement of the players when they play the game. Another pointed out that the game was good for, particularly, the use of the cameras and the animation except that the scenario used for the game's plot was more than sufficient for players not to understand the story.

An article published by Sony Computer Entertainment Japan commented that if the game was animated, the DVDs would have been bought. Furthermore, it also comments on the game's creation was to showcase the capabilities of the PlayStation 2's graphics.

On release, Famitsu magazine scored the game a 32 out of 40. Currently, the game holds a score of 72% at PS2GameDounano and a score of 70% in PlayStation Mk2.
