= Fluid (video game) =

1996 music video game

- Developer: Opus (Note: Additional work by Sony Computer Entertainment Japan.)
- Publisher: Sony Computer Entertainment
- Director: Jun Tsuda
- Producer: Takayuki Suzuki
- Programmer: Takaya Nakamura
- Platform: PlayStation
- Release: JP: December 6, 1996; EU: August 1, 1998
- Genre: Music
- Mode: Single-player

Fluid (known in Japan as Depth) is a music video game developed by Opus and published by Sony Computer Entertainment for the PlayStation. It was initially released in Japan in December 1996 and in Europe in August 1998. The game's concept is an interactive sound lab which allows the player to create dance and electronic music.

== Gameplay ==
The player character, a dolphin, passes through several stages to unlock more sounds, including "Abyss Lair" and "Jungle Reef". Levels can be replayed and selected from the Silent Space, which contains twelve geometric shapes representing the levels "passed". The player starts in the first stage, "Peace," and continues through to "Abyss", and ten other levels. Each level contains its own sound set, which can be imported into other levels upon completion. The sounds can be utilized to create dance and electronic music in the "Groove Editor".

=== Groove Editor ===
The "Groove Editor" allows for in-depth manipulation of collected samples. Several tracks can be mixed at once, with speed, pitch, frequency, and modulation controlled by a series of coloured crystals. Mixes can be saved to a memory card and then played during levels. Controlling the dolphin allowed the player to add improvisations during playback sessions, with frequency mapped to the up/down controls and modulation to the left/ right controls.

== Reception ==
Reception

Review scores
| Publication | Score |
|---|---|
| Dengeki PlayStation | 85/100, 70/100 |
| Famicom Tsūshin | 6/10, 10/10, 7/10, 7/10 |

Oli Yarwood of Eurogamer appreciated the game for its surreal nature and soundtrack, comparing it positively to Harmonix's Frequency and Amplitude (also published by Sony).
