= Mad Maestro! =

2001 video game

- Developer: Desert Productions (Note: Additional work by Sony Computer Entertainment Japan.)
- Publisher: Sony Computer Entertainment: NA/EU: Fresh Games
- Director: Hiroyuki Kotani
- Producer: Tomikazu Kirita
- Designers: Jun Chuma; Junichi Suehiro
- Programmers: Kakushi Ohara; Takahiro Tanaka; Kouji Yamaguchi
- Artists: Kazuya Hattori; Toshiyuki Onishi; Yukiko Shiba
- Writer: Kazuya Hattori
- Composers: Jun Chuma; Yuji Takenouchi; Mayuko Kageshita
- Platform: PlayStation 2
- Release: JP: October 11, 2001; NA: March 13, 2002; EU: March 28, 2002
- Genre: Music
- Mode: Single-player

Mad Maestro!, known in Japan as Bravo Music (Note: Japanese: ブラボーミュージック, Hepburn: Burabō Myūjikku), is a rhythm video game developed by Desert Productions and published by Sony Computer Entertainment for the PlayStation 2. It was released in October 2001 in Japan and internationally by Fresh Games in 2002. Playing as the orchestra conductor Takt, the player must play the song by pressing the button according to the correct pressure on the screen. The game utilizes a soundtrack composed of entirely classical music by famous composers such as Beethoven, Brahms, and Tchaikovsky.

Despite mixed critical reception in the west, the game was sold well and received positive reviews in its native Japan. This led to three Japan-only follow-ups with two "expansions", Bravo Music: Christmas Edition in 2001, and Bravo Music: Chou-Meikyokuban in 2002, and alongside them, a proper sequel called Let's Bravo Music also in 2002.

== Gameplay ==
Typically rhythm games rely on timed input according to on-screen cues and tempo. Mad Maestro features this style of gameplay, with the additional layer of pressure sensitivity. Utilizing the pressure sensitivity with the DualShock 2, the player must conduct an orchestra by tapping correlating buttons with varying degrees of pressure. There are three levels of pressure; light, medium and hard. By playing well and increasing their score, the player can reach Bravo Mode, which is required to beat the stage. By playing 3 or more notes bad however, the player is forced into Devil Mode, where their score will fall until they play a correct cycle perfectly. The Japanese release featured an optional Baton peripheral.

== Story ==
In Bravo Town, a young composer named Takt is the leader of an orchestral group known as the Bravo Youth Orchestra, and they perform at the town's Concert Hall. To modernize the town however, Bravo Town announces that they will tear down the hall. Prior to the date however, a fairy and overall guardian to the hall named Symphony awakens. She flies over to Takt's house, who tells him that the concert hall was around for a very long time, and that if it does get demolished, music could lose their power. So, she recognizes Takt's musical power and they decide to recruit various Bravo Town citizens to convince the town to keep the Concert Hall.

After recruiting a couple, a clown and her lion partner, a fashion designer and a model, a reporter and some aliens, as well as a young flute prodigy and a long-forgotten-about composer, the new Bravo Youth Orchestra compose at the hall, which convinces the town to keep the hall as everyone returns to their life, and Symphony goes back to becoming the guardian of the Concert Hall.

== Characters ==
- Takt (タクト, Takuto): A young orchestra composer, and the main composer for the "Bravoes", an orchestra group created by himself. He is visited by the magical fairy Symphony while looking at new songs, who tells him about the demolition of the town's Concert Hall, and how him and his orchestra can save it with Takt's musical powers. Takt is also willing to help out other people with their problems with his powers, often whistling to get their attention.
- Symphony (シンフォニー, Shinfonī): A magical fairy that was originally stone, but is awakened in the Concert Hall. She immediately goes to Takt to tell him about the demolition of the Concert Hall, and convinces him to save it. Before a stage, she tells what's the situation so that Takt can fix it. At the end of the game, she reverts to the stone statue, with Takt looking at her before leaving. She later appears in Let's Bravo Music, where she and Takt plan to restore the pages of the Legendary Opuses so she doesn't disappear alongside the power of music.
- Darlin (ダーリン, Dārin): A fashionable man who is Hannie's boyfriend. At the beginning of his stage, he and Hannie were supposed to meet for a date at the Bravo Town Park, but was extremely late, causing Hannie to get mad. Before the two could fight, Takt came and stopped them, using his musical powers to make them dance to Johannes Brahms' "Hungarian Dance No. 6". He is also one of five starting people Takt helped out to join him and help save the Concert Hall. In stage 7, he is trying to convince Hannie to join Takt, but fails, until some of the Bravoes help convince her to play along with the song that was currently playing. At the Final Concert, he plays the cello along with Hannie, and marries her during the credits scene. Darlin's name is based on the surname Darling, and he speaks in a stereotypical Italian accent.
- Hannie (ハニー, Hanī): A blonde woman who is Darlin's girlfriend. She seems to have a very bad temper, as she gets mad at Darlin for being late to their date in stage 1. Later, while Darlin tells his friends that she began to play the cello, she is not convinced to join Takt and the Bravoes in stage 7, where Takt performs March from the Nutcracker by Pyotr Ilyich Tchaikovsky while Darlin tries to convince her as well. However, she soon warms up to Takt after stage 7, as she also helps Takt find someone to join them. She is friends with Nikki Domino. In the end, she marries Darlin.
- Antonio (アントニオ): A reporter for BNN. In his stage, he and his crew are chasing after a UFO that has been spotted. As aliens come out of the UFO, Antonio waves to them, however the aliens begin to attack the area. As Antonio's crew flees, Takt comes to help Antonio and calm the aliens, playing Ride of the Valkyries from The Valkyrie by Richard Wagner. He also helps Takt to convince the aliens to join his orchestra during stage 10. During the final concert, Antonio plays the trumpet. Antonio later appears in Bravo Music: Chou-Meikyokuban, reporting that the aliens are coming from Mars to Earth to listen to the Bravoes. He pleads Takt and the Bravoes to use their music to make sure the aliens don't invade Earth. He also helps out along with Takt to come up with compositions for the concert for the aliens. Along with the aliens, Takt, and Symphony, Antonio is the only character to appear in another Bravo Music game outside of the original.
- Jean-Paul Neostyle (ジャン・ポール ネオスタイル, Jan・Pōru Neosutairu): A fashion designer, mainly known for designing the clothes Nikki Domino wears. In the cutscene of his stage, Nikki yells at him constantly before a fashion show, turning him into a nervous mess. Before he could freak out completely, Takt comes in to help both Nikki and Jean with the fashion show, playing "Finale from Carnival of the Animals" by Camille Saint-Saëns. He is also one of the 5 starting people to join Takt and help save the Concert Hall. He seems to even have a fear of Nikki, as he responded to Hannie with fear in his voice when she had said when she knew a top model who could help Takt. During the final concert, he plays the violin.
- Nikki Domino (ニッキ・ドミノ, Nikkī domino): A very popular supermodel. Just like Hannie, Nikki has a bad temper (Symphony even lampshades this), as she's often yelling at Jean at the designs of the outfits she has to wear. After Hannie's stage, she tells Takt that she knows Nikki, and she might be able to help. After convincing her during another fashion show by playing 40th Symphony K550/1st Movement by Wolfgang Amadeus Mozart, she admits that she doesn't know much about music, but she loves hard work, so she agrees to join Takt's orchestra. During the final concert, she plays the piano. During the ending, she is seen with Jean viewing another outfit, only to end with her yelling at him. She also attends Darlin and Hannie's wedding alongside the rest of the cast.
- Lunar (ルナ, Runa): A popular clown at the rundown circus. In her stage, she and her partner, Lionel Heart, are getting ready for a performance, however barely anyone comes to it. As her circus performer looks around in shock, Takt comes to help, playing Slavic Dance No. 7 by Antonín Dvořák as she performs. She is also one of the 5 starting people to help Takt, and plays the violin during the final concert. During the ending, she is seen with Lionel, happy that the circus has once again become popular.
- Lionel Heart (ライオネル, Raioneru): A popular lion that performs in the circus along with Lunar, however according to Symphony, he is simply a man in a costume. Takt and the Bravoes help him out during his performance in the circus, playing Marche Militarie by Franz Schubert as he performs on a unicycle and then a motorcycle. After his stage, he comments that if Lunar was helping out, then he'll help too. During the final concert, Lionel plays the drums.
- Adonis (アドニス, Adonisu): A young blue-haired boy who plays the flute. At the beginning of his stage, he is playing the flute peacefully before a raging storm interrupts him. As he watches birds fleeing, Takt comes along to help him from the storm, playing Scene from Swan Lake by Pyotr Ilyich Tchaikovsky. He is the last of the 5 starting people to help Takt. During the ending, he is seen playing his flute at sunset near the castle in his stage.
- The Aliens (宇宙人, Uchūjin): A group of aliens who attack during Antonio's stage, however with Takt's musical powers, they were able to calm down. They appear in a later stage, where Antonio recommends recruiting them for the concert. Here, Takt performs Baba Yaga'a Hut from Pictures at an Exhibition by Modest Mussorgsky. After their stage, Nikki is uncertain if Takt really wants to include the Martians in the orchestra, as it cuts to Lunar and Lionel bumping the Alien's heads together. During the final concert, the Aliens named Sho (ショー, Shō), Ron (ロン), and Poe (ポー, Pō) play the Marimba. The Alien race later appears in Bravo Music: Chou-Meikyokuban, as they plan to come to Earth in 5 days due to them wanting to hear Takt's music again.
- Etoile (エトワール, Etowāru): A fisherman who Symphony tells about after Adonis mentions he doesn't have any powerful friends. Takt finds Etoile down by the lake fishing and plays Dance of the Four Swans from Swan Lake by Pyotr Ilyich Tchaikovsky. After his stage is completed, Jean-Paul Neostyle realizes he is Etoile, who was once a famous conductor. Much like Takt, he is silent, as he doesn't respond with words. When Symphony asks if he can play an instrument, he whips out a triangle and smiles, said triangle being his instrument for the final concert. Etoile's stage is the final stage before the final concert.

== Music list ==
The list of pieces of music in the order they appear on the game.

1. Hungarian Dance No. 6 in D Major - Johannes Brahms

2. Hungarian Dance No. 5 in G Minor - Johannes Brahms

3. Slavonic Dance No. 7 - Antonín Dvořák

4. Thunder and Lightning Polka - Johann Strauss Jr.

5. Finale from Carnival of the Animals - Camille Saint-Saëns

6. The Marriage of Figaro - Wolfgang Amadeus Mozart

7. Scene from Swan Lake - Pyotr Ilyich Tchaikovsky

8. Toreador March from Carmen - Georges Bizet

9. Ride of the Valkyries from The Valkyrie - Richard Wagner

10. Night on Bald Mountain - Modest Mussorgsky

11. Marche Militaire - Franz Schubert

12. Entry of the Gladiators - Julius Fucik

13. March from the Nutcracker - Pyotr Ilyich Tchaikovsky

14. Trepak from the Nutcracker - Pyotr Ilyich Tchaikovsky

15. 40th Symphony in G Minor K550-1st movement - Wolfgang Amadeus Mozart

16. Orpheus in the Underworld Overture - Jacques Offenbach

17. Baba Yaga's Hut from Pictures at an Exhibition - Modest Mussorgsky

18. 9th Symphony in D Minor-Ode to Joy - Ludwig van Beethoven

19. Dance of the Four Swans from Swan Lake - Pyotr Ilyich Tchaikovsky

20. Morning Mood from Peer Gynt - Edvard Grieg

21. William Tell Overture - Gioachino Rossini

22. Rakoczi March - Hector Berlioz

23. 5th Symphony in C Minor-1st Movement - Ludwig van Beethoven

24. Radetsky March - Johann Strauss Sr.

25. Csikos Post - Hermann Necke

26. Toy Symphony - Leopold Mozart

27. Eine Kleine Nachtmusik - Wolfgang Amadeus Mozart

28. Dance of the Reed Flutes from the Nutcracker - Pyotr Ilyich Tchaikovsky

29. Algerian Suite from French Military March Music - Camille Saint-Saëns

30. Flight of the Bumblebee - Nikolai Rimsky-Korsakov

31. Ballet of the Unhatched Chicks from Pictures at an Exhibition - Modest Mussorgsky

32. Divertimento No. 1 in E flat major K113 - Wolfgang Amadeus Mozart

33. Farandole from L'Arlesienne Suite No. 2 - Georges Bizet

34. In the Hall of the Mountain King from Peer Gynt - Edvard Grieg

== Reception and legacy ==
Reception

Aggregate score
Aggregator	Score
Metacritic	65/100

Review scores
Publication	Score
AllGame	2/5
Edge	7/10
Electronic Gaming Monthly	7/10
Eurogamer	9/10
Famitsu	30/40
Game Informer	7.5/10
GamePro	4.5/5
GameRevolution	D+
GameSpot	6.3/10
GameSpy	64%
GameZone	6.5/10
IGN	6.5/10
Official U.S. PlayStation Magazine	3/5

The game received "mixed or average" reviews according to video game review aggregator Metacritic. The use of pressure sensitivity in addition to standard rhythm game play mechanics was considered by some to be overcomplicated. In Japan, Famitsu gave it a score of 30 out of 40.

According to Dengeki Online, the Japanese edition of Mad Maestro was the 195th best-selling video game of 2001 at 54,794 copies. Mad Maestro! was followed by three Japan-exclusive sequels, all for the PS2: Bravo Music Christmas Edition (ブラボーミュージック Christmas Edition) on November 22, 2001; Bravo Music: Chou-Meikyokuban (ブラボーミュージック 超名曲盤) on January 17, 2002; and Let's Bravo Music (Let’s ブラボーミュージック) on December 12, 2002.
