= Pet in TV =

1997 video game

- PAL version cover art
- Developer: MuuMuu (Note: Additional work by Sony Computer Entertainment Japan.)
- Publisher: Sony Computer Entertainment
- Platform: PlayStation
- Release: JP: May 23, 1997; EU: August 1998
- Genre: Digital pet
- Mode: Single-player

Pet in TV, known in Japan as Go For It! Morikawa-kun MK 2 (Note: Japanese: がんばれ森川君2号, Hepburn: Ganbare Morikawa Kun 2-gō), is a pet-raising simulation video game developed by MuuMuu and published by Sony Computer Entertainment for the PlayStation. The game was released in Japan in May 1997, and later in Europe in August 1998. Pet in TV consists of teaching a virtual pet known as a PiT (Pet in TV) tricks, getting it new costumes and learning what items are edible in the wild along with solving random puzzles around the PiT world. The game's developers, MuuMuu previously developed the Jumping Flash! series of games.

Pet in TV on release received negative reviews for its lack of gameplay, storyline and lasting appeal. It was re-released on the Japanese PlayStation Network for PlayStation 3 and PlayStation Portable on February 22, 2007. The game received a Japan-exclusive sequel also for the PlayStation, Pet in TV with my dear Dog.

== Gameplay ==
The player can choose from a selection of PiTs and name it. It is then up to the player to nurture their PiT and allow it to explore the 3D world, learning from its encounters with scenery and objects through trial-and-error. Once these behaviours are learned, the PiT will know how to respond to those objects in the future (such as a Flower, or a Spike). Whenever the PiT becomes injured, or tired, returning it to its home will allow Dr. Y to fix it.

The objective then becomes for the player's PiT to solve puzzles on its own - for which it will be rewarded with AI upgrade chips.

== Reception ==
Reception

Review scores
Publication	Score
Play	77%
Dengeki PlayStation	80/100, 75/100, 85/100, 85/100

PlayStation Power gave the game a rating of 59%, and said it was "dull for adults" and "a bit bland".
