= Aconcagua (video game) =

2000 adventure video game

- Developer: WACWAC! (Note: Sony Computer Entertainment Japan assisted on development.)
- Publisher: Sony Computer Entertainment
- Platform: PlayStation
- Release: JP: June 1, 2000
- Genre: Point-and-click adventure
- Mode: Single-player

Aconcagua (アコンカグア) is a 2000 adventure video game developed by WACWAC! and published by Sony Computer Entertainment for the PlayStation. It was released only in Japan.

The game is set on a mountain after a plane crash, and allows for switching between characters.

== Plot ==
The setting of the game is in the fictional country of Meruza – which was named after the actual Argentine province Mendoza; the country is currently undergoing political turmoil as the result of an independence movement. The movement has split Argentina in half, and a 33-year-old activist named Pachamama goes on a flight as part of a politically motivated independence tour.

During the flight, a terrorist detonates a bomb, which causes the plane to crash near Aconcagua's peak. Only five passengers survive the crash: the aforementioned Pachamama, Katoh (a journalist covering Pachamama's story), Steve (an engineer), Julia (who presents herself as a journalist), and Lopez (who is native to the region). The survivors must make their way down the mountain safely while dealing with various obstacles as they arise along their journey.

== Gameplay ==
In Aconcagua, the player controls five survivors from a plane crash as they try to safely descend a mountain. The game is organized in a series of missions which the player must complete from a third-person perspective. During the descent, the terrorists, knowing their plot failed, try to eliminate the survivors via helicopter drops. It also involves various problem-solving and survival skills while using items left behind from the downed plane. The game features over 80 minutes of cinematic cutscenes to advance the plot.

At any time, the player can change between characters.

Aconcagua has been compared to Chase the Express, as well as Dino Crisis, Parasite Eve and the Resident Evil series. However, its gameplay and structure more closely resembles point-and-click adventure games.

== Development ==
Development began when Yasutaka Masuda, who worked on planning and writing Aconcagua, qualified for the Game Creator Support Program, sponsored by the SCE. Wanting to create something new and having a fondness for adventure novels, he decided to create Aconcagua. Having decided to set the game in South America, he decided to name the game after a mountain, wanting something easy for players to understand.

The story's conception began with the idea of descending a mountain and the goal of making something gritty and realistic. Initially, the game had eight playable characters, and several characters that made it into the game had different backstories. The three characters cut from the game were Rohinistin (a German climber), an unnamed CIA agent, and Nieve (who was local to the region and a traitor). Some of the removed character's traits were given to the remaining characters (for example, Katoh was given climbing skills). Some character changes were made to suit the story while others (like Lopez being able to use weapons) were changed in service of the game's design.

The only character that remained mostly unchanged from their conception was Steve. His largest change was going from being a computer-skilled hacker type to become more of a mechanical engineer. The development team considered a character with his personality to be crucial to the story, and described him as "the most human" and "the staff's favourite character."

Hiromichi Takahashi, the game's director, pushed to add romance to the game, arguing it would be nice to see the character's relationships developing over the course of the game. Masuda disagreed with adding romance, claiming not to be good at writing them. Another element that was cut from the final game was a sequence where the characters are chased by military dogs. Takahashi said that he decided on the game's general flow, but he "left the game's finer details, including what to cut, to the programmers."

== Release ==
The game was released in Japan on June 1, 2000. The game was previewed on Sony's website, which showed trailers that featured English dialogue. Aconcagua was set to be released in North America sometime in late 2000, but it was never released there, despite the game having voice acting and subtitles in cutscenes in English.

It received a full English language fan translation in 2022.

== Reception ==
Hardcore Gaming 101 called Aconcagua "one of the great forefathers of the survival genre," highlighting how the game uses contextual events, music, and visuals to create unique and immersive play experiences. They also compliment the game's puzzles and story.

The Japanese game magazine Famitsu gave the game a score of 29 out of 40.

German magazine Video Games gave it a score of 70%.
