= Flipnic: Ultimate Pinball =

2005 pinball video game

- North American box art
- Developer(s): Sony Computer Entertainment Japan
- Publisher(s): JP: Sony Computer Entertainment; NA: Capcom; EU: Ubisoft
- Platform(s): PlayStation 2
- Release: JP: August 7, 2003; EU: January 23, 2004; NA: July 12, 2005
- Genre(s): Pinball
- Mode(s): Single-player, multiplayer

Flipnic: Ultimate Pinball is a pinball video game developed and published by Sony Computer Entertainment for the PlayStation 2. It was released in August 2003 in Japan, January 2004 in Europe by Ubi Soft and July 2005 in North America by Capcom.

== Gameplay ==
Flipnic features a wide variety of virtual pinball tables, some with realistic physics, others with antigravity, vertical climbs and other variations.

== Reception ==
Flipnic: Ultimate Pinball

Aggregate score
Aggregator	Score
Metacritic	64/100

Review scores
Publication	Score
1Up.com	55%
GameSpot	6.9/10
GameSpy	
IGN	5.2/10
Official U.S. PlayStation Magazine	

In 2011, Flipnic was listed in the book 1001 Video Games You Must Play Before You Die, where it was described as "a video game concept album about pinball games."

Writing on Games Asylum, Matt Gander praised it, saying "Gravity and realistic ball physics were thrown out the window, in favour of tables filled with loops and rollercoaster-style tracks for balls to whizz around in," but noted the tendency of the game to crash.
