= Space Fishermen =

2002 video game

- Box art
- Developer(s): Land Ho! (Note: Additional work by Sony Computer Entertainment Japan.)
- Publisher(s): Sony Computer Entertainment
- Director(s): Tomohiro Kondo
- Producer(s): Yasuhide Kobayashi
- Composer(s): Soichi Terada
- Platform(s): PlayStation 2
- Release: JP: October 24, 2002
- Genre(s): Fishing
- Mode(s): Single-player

Space Fishermen (Note: Japanese: スペースフィッシャーメン, Hepburn: Supēsu Fisshāmen) is a 2002 fishing video game developed by Land Ho! and published by Sony Computer Entertainment for the PlayStation 2. It was released only in Japan. The game is notable for its cel-shaded visual style reminiscent of John Kricfalusi's, with the design of the game's protagonists being mistaken as his creations; Sony in fact did work with Kricfalusi and his studio Spümcø on Yoake no Mariko, whose sequel was released nine months prior for the PlayStation 2 and was also exclusive to Japan.

== Gameplay ==
The player uses the two analog sticks of the DualShock 2 to fish: the left analog sticks is used to control the rod while the right analog stick is used to reel in the fish. After placing the lure to attract the fish and capturing it, it will fly into the air in an attempt to escape, where the right analog stick must be moved to the opposite side of the fish' direction to reel it in. After the fish is reeled in, a lure based on the fish is provided to the player. The lure are of multiple types based on the fish caught, and different fish have different preferences of lure types. Minigames and the ability to catch stronger fish appear as the player levels up.

== Plot ==
The player controls three characters: Diver, a bodybuilder wearing a diving helmet to obscure his face and a loincloth, Masabo, a stout and optimistic astronaut resembling Stimpy from The Ren & Stimpy Show and Swallow, a blue woman with extremely long hair. They sign up for a fishing competition where they attempt to capture the absurd fauna of outer space with fishing rods that resemble rifles.

== Development ==
Space Fishermen is the first game developed by Land Ho! to not be a derby video game and their first original project. Masonobu Tsukamoto, founder of Land Ho!, recruited a significant amount of talent to develop the game. He had wanted to make a game with an idea that could not possibly happen in real life, hence the development team chose a fishing game in outer space. The visual style is reminiscent of American animation, with the characters' exaggerated details and personalities standing out.
