= Piyotama =

2007 video game

- Developer(s): Japan Studio
- Publisher(s): Sony Computer Entertainment
- Platform(s): PlayStation 3, PlayStation Portable
- Release: PlayStation 3 August 9, 2007; PlayStation Portable; July 28, 2010
- Genre(s): Puzzle
- Mode(s): Single-player, multiplayer

Piyotama (Note: Japanese: ピヨタマ) is a puzzle video game developed by Japan Studio and published by Sony Computer Entertainment for the PlayStation 3. It was released in 2007 on PlayStation Network, with a port for the PlayStation Portable releasing in 2010.

== Premise and gameplay ==
Hidden deep within the Hotai forest, you'll find a family of playful and mysteriously colored creatures known as Piyos. Every spring mother Piyo, Piyomama, lays a few eggs to fill the forest with new colorful Piyos; however, this year she got too excited and laid too many!

Help her hatch the eggs before they overflow the nest!

Piyotama is a puzzle game where the goal is to manipulate colored eggs and line up four or more in a row to "hatch" them. The eggs can only be manipulated when outside of the "nest" (the play area), which is accomplished by sliding the selected row of eggs to the left or right using the dpad. The order of the three eggs pushed out of the nest can be cycled left or right using the X and O buttons, respectively. The current row can be changed with the up and down directions on the dpad allowing them to be re-inserted on a different row to form lines of matching eggs.

Once a line of four eggs is formed a "hatch" is begun, giving the player a short time to create more lines of eggs to form a combo to score more points before the eggs hatch. When the "hatch" timer is up any eggs that formed part of a line will hatch and the little Piyos will fly off to collect on either side of the screen. An egg will hatch even if it is no longer part of a line of matching eggs, so long as it is not being held outside of the nest. The remaining eggs will fall to fill in the gaps. When enough points are scored the player's level increases.

An additional dimension is added to the controls by the use of the Sixaxis controller's motion-sensing abilities. By shaking the Sixaxis from side-to-side the eggs can be shaken to fall into gaps. Shaking the controller up-and-down will cause the eggs to jump about offering limited control in re-ordering the eggs beyond manipulating them three-at-a-time beyond the nest. If a hatch has started, shaking the controller will cause the eggs to hatch immediately. The maneuver can be particularly useful in the battle mode when the eggs are getting close to filling the nest, which would result in the end of the game.

Piyotama features timed ("Piyo Coop") and untimed ("Free-Range") single-player modes, the former allowing high scores to be uploaded to an online leader board via the PlayStation Network. A 2-player "Battle Mode" is also included for local competitive play.

== Development and release ==
Four skin packs, seasonal graphical themes, have been released for free via the Japanese PlayStation Store. The first was a beach-themed summer pack, the second a Halloween theme, thirdly a Christmas theme and most recently a Valentine's theme. Availability of these packs varies by region as Sony has not released them to all markets.
