= Talkman =

2005 video game

- Developer: Sony Computer Entertainment Japan
- Publisher: Sony Computer Entertainment
- Platform: PlayStation Portable
- Release: JP: November 17, 2005; NA: August 5, 2008
- Genre: Edutainment
- Mode: Single-player

Talkman is an edutainment video game developed and published by Sony Computer Entertainment for the PlayStation Portable. It utilizes voice-activated translation software that operates in four languages, Japanese, English, Korean, and Mandarin Chinese. The name "Talkman" is a reference to Sony's Walkman line of portable audio products. It was released in Japan on November 17, 2005, and in America on August 5, 2008 (via the PlayStation Store), as Talkman Travel. In America, however, instead of receiving all the languages included in the Japanese version in one package, single-language packs are available for $2.99 each. Available packs are: Paris (French), Rome (Italian), and Tokyo (Japanese).

The software is designed for travelers and entertainment, mostly containing slang and useful travel phrases. While originally sold in and designed for the Japanese market for Japanese users, its translation function operates between all four languages. In Japan, the software has proven popular with the middle-aged female demographic due to an interest in South Korean products, and Korean-language soap operas and movies; and as a fun English education aid for children.

Outside of pure translations, Talkman also lets players play games to test their fluency of a language. The program comes with a USB microphone included. This microphone draws power through two gold-colored contacts on the top of the PSP, one on each side of the mini-USB port. This is uncommon due to the ability for most USB products to draw power through USB. These proprietary contacts are similar to the gold-colored contacts on the bottom-right of the device, which are used for charging.

Note: The Chotto Shot (aka "Go!Cam") has a built-in microphone that also can be used with the Talkman program. Furthermore, the PSP-3000 model and PSP Go have built-in microphones that work with this application, without the need for any external attachments.

== Talkman Euro ==
Following the success of the Asian version of Talkman, a version designed for translating European languages was developed and released on June 16, 2006. Talkman Euro is available in two versions. The Japanese version contains support for English, Italian, Spanish, German, French, and Japanese, while the Chinese version contains support for Traditional Chinese instead of Japanese. The differences on the packaging (the Japanese flag as opposed to a flag with the word "mie" in Chinese) are minimal and hard to notice.

== Talkman UMD-only package ==
Talkman is also released as a UMD-only package, so users who already have the USB mic or camera can choose to purchase this standalone version. The Sony PSP Headset and the built-in microphone on later model PSPs have also been confirmed to work with Talkman.
