= Rain (video game) =

2013 video game

rain
- Developers: Acquire; Japan Studio
- Publisher: Sony Computer Entertainment
- Director: Yuki Ikeda
- Designer: Tomoharu Fujii
- Artist: Seiichi Terashima
- Composer: Yugo Kanno
- Platform: PlayStation 3
- Release: NA: October 1, 2013; EU: October 2, 2013; JP: October 3, 2013
- Genre: Adventure

Rain (stylized as rain), known in parts of Asia as Lost in the Rain, is an adventure video game developed by Acquire and Japan Studio and published by Sony Computer Entertainment for the PlayStation 3 in 2013. It is centered around a novel mechanic whereby the player's character and all enemies are only visible if they are standing in the rain.

== Gameplay ==
Rain is an adventure game which is centred around the novel mechanic of invisibility. The player takes on the role of a young boy who is invisible and can only be seen when standing in the pouring rain. When under canopies, bridges and awnings outside, and also while sheltered indoors, the boy cannot be seen by the player themself nor the enemies that inhabit the world, and can only be tracked by his watery footprints. The invisibility mechanic applies not only to the player's character but also to all enemies within the game.

The player utilizes the visibility of the boy, and other creatures, in the rain to solve various puzzles and tasks throughout the game.

== Plot ==
Rain takes place in a town loosely inspired by mid-twentieth century Paris, and follows a young boy. In the opening of the game, he is stuck in bed at home with a fever. During the day he stares out of his window and sees an invisible girl in the rain who is given form by the rain casting a silhouette around her. She stares at him for a brief second before being chased away by something huge and menacing that is also invisible unless the rain gives it a form.

Curious, he follows the two down an alleyway, whereupon exiting through a pair of large doors, the day suddenly turns to night and the town is now deserted, occupied only by strange invisible beasts that roam the streets. The boy also realises that he himself is invisible, and that he and the beasts are only given form by the rain.

With the way back closed, he attempts to find the girl, who is still pursued by the beasts; the one the boy saw from his window is referred to as the Unknown. Using any means to shelter from the rain, the boy evades the creatures that prowl the streets and alleyways, yet the girl proves ever elusive.

After missing his chance to meet the girl at a church that's under renovation, the boy follows her into the grounds of a disused factory and finally makes his presence known to her. They escape together, but neither is able to hear the other's voice. Regardless, they continue on through the town while being pursued by the Unknown.

As the game progresses, the children become aware that each has a visible doppelgänger asleep in their respective homes. The girl attempts to awaken her other self, and while doing so begins to become visible again. But before she can wake her doppelgänger up, she is chased away by the Unknown.

The boy follows, and upon exiting her house, discovers that the town has completely restructured itself into a castle maze-type layout that is afloat on water with no end in sight. He eventually reunites with the girl and the two flee from the ever-pursuing Unknown.

Drawn to a strange light at the edge of the Unknown’s domain, the two arrive in an alleyway with the light seeping in through the very doors they had passed through when entering the world of the night. Exposure to the light suddenly weakens the Unknown. Seeing this the children open both doors, causing the Unknown to collapse upon the ground.

However, they realise they cannot leave as without the rain, they have no physical form. Instead they resolve to drag the Unknown into the light beyond the door at the cost of trapping themselves in the world of night. After they close the doors, the Unknown pushes the door open as he dies and collapses onto the boy, pinning him. Unable to free him, the girl abandons him and heads straight to his home. There she yells at his window in hopes to awaken him. She succeeds, but as the boy becomes visible, the girl is left trapped and alone.

As with the beginning of the game, the ending is illustrated with watercolour painted stills. The boy awakens in his bed the next morning and immediately sets off across town, retracing his steps to the girl’s home. Standing outside below her bedroom window he attempts to awaken her the way she awoke him, and the girl finally appears on her bedroom porch. The game ends with the two reuniting on the street outside the girl's house underneath a rainbow.

== Development ==
The concept for Rain originated as a starting point to create a game featuring a completely invisible protagonist, exploring how the environment could dictate a character's form through rain. The game was developed through a close collaboration between Acquire and Japan Studio under Sony's PlayStation C.A.M.P! incubator program, which aimed to support experimental titles following the success of unique games like Journey, Tokyo Jungle, and Echochrome. The narrative's tone was shaped by the March 2011 Tōhoku earthquake and tsunami; while the team initially planned a darker story focused on severe suffering, witnessing the disaster prompted them to alter the core concept toward a message of human connection and hope. According to director Yuki Ikeda, the central emotional theme of the narrative was inspired by the universal childhood experience of getting lost, which evokes a mix of loneliness and fear, alongside intense curiosity about one's unfamiliar surroundings. Lead planner Tomoharu Fujii, art director Seiichi Terashima, and map designer Tomokazu Oki designed the empty, urban night environment to feel "lived-in," seeking to evoke nostalgia and melancholy by suggesting the ghosts of other people's presence had been there moments prior.

The production process faced design hurdles. Art director Seiichi Terashima stated that during the initial phases, the team compiled a vast stockpile of conceptual gameplay ideas, but upon trying to implement them into the prototype build, they realized many were functionally unplayable. Around the time of the PlayStation Awards in December 2012, director Yuki Ikeda sought advice from veteran director Keiichiro Toyama, creator of Silent Hill and the Siren franchise, who was then at Japan Studio following the release of his recent game Gravity Rush. Toyama advised Ikeda to halt the addition of new content and instead focus entirely on fine-tuning and testing existing elements. Following this guidance, the team eliminated unpolished mechanics, which Ikeda credited with successfully streamlining the project into a more approachable gameplay experience.

=== Music ===
The game's soundtrack was carefully crafted to enhance the melancholy atmosphere of the environment. Producer Noriko Umemura noted that the team thought classical music would integrate well with the sound of rain. The original score was composed by Yugo Kanno. To ensure the music harmonized with the gameplay, Kanno composed the melodies while actively listening to various recorded sounds of falling rain. Kanno also integrated a bandoneon into the score, collaborating with player Hirofumi Mizuno, aiming to directly convey deep emotions and complement the game's lonely atmosphere. The game's central theme song, "A Tale Only the Rain Knows", features vocals by British singer Connie Talbot over a vocal arrangement of Claude Debussy's classic piano piece "Clair de Lune", which also serves as the game's opening theme.

== Release ==
While the digital version, released via the PlayStation Network, is available in all regions, the game's physical disc based release was limited to Japan, with only Japanese language options, and a Hong Kong and Taiwan release containing English and Traditional Chinese language options. This last version is the only way to acquire an English language copy of the game in physical form, making it a sought after collectible.

== Reception ==
Reception

Aggregate score
Aggregator	Score
Metacritic	72/100

Review scores
Publication	Score
Eurogamer	6/10
GameSpot	7/10
IGN	7/10
Polygon	8.5/10
Hardcore Gamer	3/5

The game received an aggregated score of 72/100 on Metacritic based on 77 reviews. Daniel Krupa of IGN rated the game a 7/10, praising some of the game's mechanics but said "Rain creates a distinctive heartbreaking atmosphere, but fails to develop it into a more engrossing experience." Tom Mc Shea of GameSpot gave the game a 7.0 as well, praising the gameplay, music and some of the puzzles, saying "Rain uses chilling atmosphere and a heartfelt story to draw you in to this fantastical world", but criticized some of the mechanics of the puzzles. Brittany Vincent of Hardcore Gamer gave the game a 3/5, saying "There's the potential for a beautiful journey here, but Rain seems to be too content to wallow in its melancholy to create any real engaging gameplay." Philip Kollar of Polygon gave the game an 8.5, stating "Rain pulls strong emotion out of its simple mechanics." Christian Donlan from Eurogamer rated the game a 6/10, while praising its lighting and atmosphere, he criticized the poorly paced story and the repetitive plot, as well as the game for not being challenging. He called the game "a missed opportunity".

During the 17th Annual D.I.C.E. Awards, the Academy of Interactive Arts & Sciences nominated Rain for "Outstanding Achievement in Original Music Composition".

== Legacy ==
In retrospect, Rain has been recognized as a hidden gem within the PlayStation 3 library, valued for its visual appeal and artistic design. It has developed a minor cult reputation among fans of atmospheric experiences, with critics drawing strong artistic and thematic parallels to Fumito Ueda's Ico, particularly regarding its sense of vulnerability and the bond between the two main characters.

This status is further reflected in the modern collectors' market; due to the scarcity of its physical printings, the English-supported Asian release has since been cited by industry outlets as one of the rarest and most sought-after physical games on the PlayStation 3.
