= Dual Hearts =

2002 video game

- North American cover art
- Developer: Matrix Software (Note: Additional work by Sony Computer Entertainment Japan.)
- Publishers: JP: Sony Computer Entertainment; NA: Atlus
- Director: Keizo Kato
- Designers: Hideaki Kikukawa; Keizo Kato
- Programmers: Naomasa Ariki; Yuichi Ono; Munehiro Tani
- Composers: Tetsuo Ishikawa; Masala Nishid
- Platform: PlayStation 2
- Release: JP: February 14, 2002; NA: September 23, 2002
- Genre: Action-adventure
- Mode: Single-player

Dual Hearts (Note: Japanese: デュアルハーツ, Hepburn: Dyuaru Hātsu) is a 2002 action-adventure video game developed by Matrix Software and published by Sony Computer Entertainment for the PlayStation 2. Atlus released the game in North America. It was released on PlayStation Network in 2015.

== Story ==
The plot begins with a treasure hunter named Rumble learning about a treasure, the Dream Stone on Sonno Island and setting out for it. At the same time, Tumble, who is a magical dream creature called a baku, is summoned by the Dream Queen to protect dream orbs. They both come to the same island and after a strange twist of fate become partners. Bakus can exist both within the dream world and the real world, and Rumble uses Tumble to travel into different peoples' dreams searching for the dream orbs. Most of the dreams become nightmares full of dangerous monsters.

== Reception ==
Reception

Aggregate scores
Aggregator	Score
GameRankings	71.44%
Metacritic	70/100

Review scores
Publication	Score
GamePro	3.5/5
GameRevolution	C+
GameSpot	7.5/10
GameZone	7/10
IGN	7/10
X-Play	3/5

Dual Hearts received mixed reviews from critics upon its release in North America. On Metacritic, the game holds a score of 70/100 based on 17 reviews, indicating "mixed or average reviews". On GameRankings, the game holds a score of 71.44% based on 25 reviews.
