= Trash Panic =

2009 video game

- Developer: Japan Studio
- Publisher: Sony Computer Entertainment
- Platform: PlayStation 3
- Release: JP: March 19, 2009; NA: June 4, 2009; EU: June 4, 2009
- Genre: Puzzle
- Modes: Single-player, multiplayer

Trash Panic, released in Japan as simply Gomibako (Note: Japanese: ゴミ箱, Hepburn: Gomibako; lit. "Trash") is a 2009 puzzle video game developed by Japan Studio and published by Sony Computer Entertainment for the PlayStation 3. It was released on the PlayStation Network.

== Gameplay ==
A stream of garbage is carried via a conveyor belt toward a garbage can in the middle of the screen, and the object of the game is to break down the garbage by strategically placing it into the can based on the items available before the can fills to overflowing. If three pieces of undamaged garbage fall out of the trash can, the game will end. Players may process garbage by setting fire to burnable items, some garbage will decompose when placed near the correct substances, and lighter or fragile objects (a television, for example) may be smashed by heavier ones (a bowling ball). The stream of garbage will continue to drop into the trash can until either the player successfully compacts a certain quantity of items or the trash can is filled to overflowing.

Items of garbage in the game start small, with things like pencils, pens, staplers, erasers, and other office trash. As the trash items gradually become larger (eventually becoming whole buildings, entire pieces of land, meteors, etc.), the trash can becomes larger to compensate, eventually coming to sit on top of Planet Earth itself. In addition to normal trash items, at the end of every level (in Main Dish difficulty) is a larger 'boss' item that must be compacted in ten seconds, otherwise resulting in penalty trash, consisting of impossible-to-break items released into the trash can to fill space more quickly. Every so often a special piece of trash, called mottainai (pronounced mo-teye-neye, meaning a sense or regret for waste in Japanese) will fall and must not be compacted (items which are assumed to have been thrown out by mistake, jewelry for example). Mottainai needs to be placed near the bottom of the trash can to be taken away by the NPC near the can. If the special trash is destroyed by accident, the player's Ego score will be penalized, and penalty trash will be released.

The scoring system is divided into two categories depending on how the player chooses to dispose of or compact their garbage to progress through the stage: Eco (Ecological) versus Ego (Egotistical). If the player groups together biodegradable items so that they decompose naturally and smashes much of their garbage into smaller, more compact pieces, their Eco rating will rise. Should the player choose to burn much of their garbage, however, their Ego rating will rise instead. The player's score does not directly affect game progress—so long as the trash is compacted sufficiently, the game will continue regardless of Ego or Eco rating—but higher overall Eco ratings will help to unlock extra levels and modes.

=== Main mode ===
The player will progress through a series of six stages. Three versions, ranging in difficulty from Sweets (easy), Main Dish (medium), and Hellish (hard, must be unlocked) can be chosen to play.

=== Unlimited mode ===
The player will attempt to compact garbage for as long as possible until their trash can finally overflows.

=== Versus mode ===
Two players may battle one another in a split-screen version of the game.

=== Mission mode ===
The player must fulfill a variety of "waste management" missions.

== Online features ==
Online leaderboards and trophy support are available for both single player and multiplayer high scores via the PlayStation Network. In addition, players have the option to upload up to 10 minutes of a gaming session to YouTube.
