= Tsugunai: Atonement =

2001 video game

- North American cover art
- Developer: Cattle Call (Note: Additional work by Sony Computer Entertainment Japan.)
- Publishers: JP: Sony Computer Entertainment; NA: Atlus USA
- Director: Yoshihiro Yamamoto
- Designers: Katsutoshi Sasaki; Shigeki Sugimoto
- Programmer: Hirotoshi Kuwabara
- Writer: Katsutoshi Sasaki
- Composer: Yasunori Mitsuda
- Platform: PlayStation 2
- Release: JP: February 22, 2001; NA: November 29, 2001
- Genre: Role-playing
- Mode: Single-player

Tsugunai: Atonement (Note: Released in Japan as simply Tsugunai (つぐない)) is a 2001 role-playing video game developed by Cattle Call and published by Sony Computer Entertainment for the PlayStation 2. It was released in North America by Atlus USA.

== Story ==
The main character, Reise, is a Raven, a sort of mercenary who takes dangerous jobs to earn a living. The game opens as Reise climbs an ancient tower to retrieve the Treasure Orb, a sacred artifact. In doing so, he angers the gods, who retaliate by separating Reise's body and soul. In order to atone for his sins, Reise must demonstrate kindness and courage by assisting the denizens of a small fishing village. He accomplishes this by possessing the bodies of those he needs to help, in order to allow them to accomplish tasks that they will not or cannot accomplish by themselves. In time, he ends up saving the village from a great evil.

== Gameplay ==
The game is broken up into around 35 different quests. Some of them involve the principal characters, while some are more peripheral and lets the player explore the lives of some of the other characters in the village. All combat-oriented quests involve the principal characters. Once Reise meets the quest's objective, the quest is solved and the story advances, often changing the situation in the village and opening up new quests.

Even though the game involves many different characters, the mechanics treat the characters as equal, except in the case of the weapons they can equip. Magic, supplementary equipment, and items are carried over from quest to quest, regardless of whom Reise possesses.

== Music ==
The score was written by Yasunori Mitsuda, better known for his work at Square, including the Chrono series and Xenogears. A soundtrack featuring enhanced quality, An Cinniùint, was released in Japan on December 25, 2001.

== Reception ==
Reception

Aggregate score
Aggregator	Score
Metacritic	67/100

Review scores
Publication	Score
AllGame	4/5
Electronic Gaming Monthly	7.5/10
Famitsu	28/40
Game Informer	7.25/10
GamePro	3/5
GameSpot	4.1/10
IGN	8.4/10
Official U.S. PlayStation Magazine	3/5
PlayStation: The Official Magazine	6/10

In Japan, Famitsu gave the game a score of 28 out of 40. Upon its release in North America, the game received "average" reviews according to the review aggregation website Metacritic.

Tsugunai: Atonement debuted at number 19 on the Famitsu Japanese sales chart and selling 6,261 units.
