= SkyGunner =

2001 video game

- Developer: PixelArts (Note: Additional work by Sony Computer Entertainment Japan.)
- Publishers: JP: Sony Computer Entertainment; NA: Atlus USA
- Directors: Hiroyuki Kotani; Yuji Nakamura
- Producer: Tomikazu Kirita
- Designer: Yoshikazu Hiraki
- Composer: Mayuko Kagesita
- Platform: PlayStation 2
- Release: JP: September 27, 2001; NA: June 25, 2002
- Genre: Combat flight simulation
- Mode: Single-player

SkyGunner is a third-person combat flight simulation video game developed by PixelArts and published by Sony Computer Entertainment for the PlayStation 2. The game's setting and art style has elements of steampunk. It was released in Japan in September 2001 and North American by Atlus USA in June 2002. Gonzo contributed anime cutscenes to the game.

== Plot ==
SkyGunner follows the story of 3 ace pilots, Ciel, Copain and Femme, who are hired to protect the "Eternal Engine", an engine capable of perpetual motion. Little do they know, the criminal genius, Ventre, is planning to use the town's celebration aboard the luxury airship, Merveilleux, as an opportunity to steal the Eternal Engine for his own evil ends.

== Reception ==
Reception

Aggregate score
Aggregator	Score
Metacritic	75/100

Review scores
Publication	Score
Edge	6/10
Electronic Gaming Monthly	8.33/10
Famitsu	29/40 (PS) 28/40
Game Informer	6.5/10
GameSpot	7.2/10
GameSpy	4/5
GameZone	8.2/10
IGN	7.8/10
Official U.S. PlayStation Magazine	3.5/5
X-Play	4/5

The game received "generally favorable reviews" according to the review aggregation website Metacritic. In Japan, Famitsu gave it a score of one eight and three sevens for a total of 29 out of 40, while Famitsu PS gave it a score of one eight, two sevens, and one six for a total of 28 out of 40.
