= Destiny of Spirits =

2014 video game

- Game Logo
- Developers: Japan Studio; Q Entertainment
- Publisher: Sony Computer Entertainment
- Platform: PlayStation Vita
- Release: JP: March 20, 2014; NA: March 25, 2014; EU: March 26, 2014
- Genres: Strategy, role-playing
- Modes: Single-player, multiplayer

Destiny of Spirits was a free-to-play role-playing video game developed by Japan Studio and Q Entertainment and published by Sony Computer Entertainment for the PlayStation Vita. The game was divided into three online regions, Asia, the Americas, and Europe, each with a separate server. The game's servers were closed down on June 30, 2015, following an announcement made a few months prior.

== Development ==
The game was announced during a pre-E3 live show in 2013. The worldwide closed beta test for the game took place during October 2013, when codes were handed out to subscribers of PlayStation Plus. Following the closure of the test, improvements were made to the game and shortcomings identified by players were addressed. The game is available in Japanese, English, and Traditional Chinese.

The game features special collaboration spirits, including Kat from Gravity Rush, and Sony mascot Toro. The game features voice acting from Kana Hanazawa and president of SCE Worldwide Studios Shuhei Yoshida. Artists involved in creating the spirit art for the game include Shunsuke Saito and VOFAN.

In March 2015, Sony announced that the game would no longer be available for both new players and existing players on June 30, 2015. While not providing reasons regarding the cancellation of the game, Sony had revealed that the game had been downloaded by more than 1 million people.

== Gameplay ==
The game is based on collecting and summoning legendary spirits and using them to battle against enemies in a turn-based combat system, in cooperation with other players. The player may select attacks to choose from, or let the system automatically decide on attacks; enemy weaknesses are affected by elemental attacks. As a location-based game, it uses the player's real-world location to determine the spirits the player is able to attain, based on the mythology of the local surroundings where the player resides. Players are able to summon Japanese youkai and shinto gods, Chinese mythological beasts, Native American folktale creatures, European spiritual figures, deities from ancient Egyptian and Mayan civilizations, and other various categories depending on their circumstances, with each spirit represented by a two-dimensional sprite created by various different artists.

Spirits may be merged to create stronger spirits or rented from other players using spirit points, whilst summoning spirits requires the use of summoning stones. The game offers the optional choice of purchasing Destiny Orbs using real-life money via the PlayStation Network, which grants the ability to perform advanced summons.

== Reception ==
Reception

Aggregate score
Aggregator	Score
Metacritic	66/100

Review scores
Publication	Score
Destructoid	6/10
Jeuxvideo.com	15/20
Play	76%
Push Square	7/10
The Digital Fix	7/10
The Escapist	3/5

At the time of release, the game received "average" reviews according to the review aggregation website Metacritic.
