= Numblast =

2009 video game

- Developer: Japan Studio
- Publisher: Sony Computer Entertainment
- Director: Yasuhito Nagaoka
- Designer: Kaori Shinozaki
- Platforms: PlayStation 3, PlayStation Portable
- Release: JP: June 18, 2009; EU: July 2, 2009; NA: November 5, 2009
- Genre: Puzzle
- Mode: Single-player

Numblast, released in Japan as Qruton (Note: Japanese: クルトン, Hepburn: Kuruton), is a 2009 puzzle video game developed and published by Sony Computer Entertainment for the PlayStation 3 and PlayStation Portable.

== Plot ==
Choco Aoyama and Akasaka Sempai are students at Cross Academy. One day, while experimenting with Numblast cubes in the Scientific Alchemy Club, Choco accidentally turns club president Akasaka into a monkey. Choco then takes it upon himself to master the mysterious cubes so that he can harness their energy and restore Akasaka's human form.

== Gameplay ==
The game is played on an 8x8 grid. Each space on the grid is occupied by a Numblast cube bearing a number between one and four. Players control a 2x2 cursor which is used to rotate groups of four cubes either clockwise or counter-clockwise. When four or more of the same cube form a square, they turn red and rotate, and their number increases by one (four cycles back to one). If another square is then formed, the relevant cubes also turn red and rotate. This process continues until no new square is formed, at which point all the red cubes disappear and points are awarded (a "Numblast" occurs when the entire play area is cleared in the same combo). A few seconds later the empty spaces are filled with random cubes. If the player fails to clear a cube within a certain time, it will turn black, and if all cubes turn black, the game is over. If four black cubes of any number form a 2x2 square, that square cannot be rotated (although the individual cubes within the square can be rotated if the player's cursor covers at least one non-black cube). After a certain number of cubes have been cleared, a special star cube appears which can occupy any number. When the special cube is used as part of a square, it eliminates all cubes of whichever number the square is otherwise made up of.

There are three available modes: endless, time trial and puzzle. In endless mode, players attempt to score as many points as possible before all cubes have turned black. The rate at which cubes turn black is determined by difficulty (easy, medium or hard) and level (which increases as more cubes are cleared). In time trial mode, players attempt to score as many points as possible in three minutes. In puzzle mode, players are required to clear predetermined patterns of cubes using as few moves as possible. Bronze, silver and gold awards are available for each puzzle depending on how many moves are required. There are fifty puzzles in total.

== Development ==
The game was directed by Yasuhito Nagaoka and designed by Kaori Shinozaki, both having done the same for Namco's Mr. Driller series before joining Japan Studio.
