= Kung Fu Rider =

2010 video game

- North American cover art
- Developer: Japan Studio
- Publisher: Sony Computer Entertainment
- Platform: PlayStation 3
- Release: NA: September 7, 2010; EU: September 15, 2010; AU: September 16, 2010; UK: September 17, 2010; JP: October 21, 2010
- Genre: Platform
- Modes: Single-player, multiplayer

Kung Fu Rider, known in Japan as Matchi Suberi (Note: Japanese: 街スベリ, Hepburn: Matchi Suberi; lit. "Town Slippery"), is a 2010 platform video game developed and published by Sony Computer Entertainment for the PlayStation 3. It uses the PlayStation Move controller. The game was officially unveiled at the 2010 Game Developers Conference in San Francisco. It received mostly negative reviews from critics, with strong criticism for its controls and gameplay, though it received praise for its humor.

== Plot ==
Players take the role of private investigator Tobin or his secretary Karin as the two escape from Triad members in Hong Kong.

== Gameplay ==
An in-game screenshot of the game

Kung Fu Rider is a platformer akin to Sonic Unleashed where players have to utilize the Move controller to navigate through the crowded streets of Hong Kong on a sliding office chair. Players can move the controller up and down to increase speed while tilting it left and right would turn the chair while tapping the Move button would cause the character to spin and kick items out of the way. Players can cruise through the streets hopping over cars, juke left, right and pick up money along the way which act as points in the game and sliding through onscreen ticket outlines which will boost the game's meter which can trigger a burst of speed by jabbing at the PlayStation Eye. Despite its title, kung fu is not utilized in any way in the game.

The game features realistic physics similar to the PlayStation Network game Pain, where the player character will be sent off the chair in slow motion upon crashing or being hit by an enemy. As players proceed deeper into the game, Triad enemies begin appearing on the way and attempt to attack the player using Bō staffs.

== Reception ==
Reception

Aggregate score
Aggregator	Score
Metacritic	36/100

Review scores
Publication	Score
1Up.com	C
Edge	4/10
Eurogamer	3/10
Famitsu	27/40
Game Informer	3.5/10
GameRevolution	D+
GameSpot	4/10
GameTrailers	4.8/10
IGN	3.5/10
Joystiq	2/5
PlayStation: The Official Magazine	6/10
Push Square	4/10
The Telegraph	1/10
Metro	1/10

Kung Fu Rider received "unfavorable" reviews according to the review aggregation website Metacritic. In Japan, however, Famitsu gave it a score of 27 out of 40.
