= The Last Guy =

2008 video game

- Developer: Japan Studio
- Publisher: Sony Computer Entertainment
- Platform: PlayStation 3
- Release: August 28, 2008
- Genre: Maze
- Mode: Single-player

The Last Guy is a 2008 maze video game developed and published by Sony Computer Entertainment for the PlayStation 3. It is available as a downloadable game on the PlayStation Store. The game is a rescue game in which the eponymous player character must guide civilians to escape from monster-infested cities. Following the Japan-exclusive release of a demo titled The Last Guy Premium Japan on July 31, 2008, the full game was released in all territories on August 28, 2008.

== Gameplay ==
The Last Guy is played from a top-down perspective of a city that has been overrun by giant monsters/yokai, which the game refers to as "zombies". The player controls the titular The Last Guy, whose job is to find and lead stranded civilians to the escape zone before the time runs out, while evading enemy creatures. He can dash, manipulate the line of people following him, and use thermal imaging to find survivors. Over twelve playable locations include cities from North America, Europe and Asia. Features include a leaderboard for each city, a leaderboard for overall score, and counters that record the number of people rescued. Each city also hosts four VIPs which, when rescued, add bonus points to the final score and unlock additional bonus stages.

In May 2009, the game was updated to include trophy support and allow downloadable content to be purchased from the PlayStation Network.

== Development ==
The Last Guy uses high-resolution satellite imagery from Google Earth to render real world cities.

== Reception ==
Reception

Aggregate scores
Aggregator	Score
GameRankings	78
Metacritic	77

Review scores
Publication	Score
Eurogamer	7/10
IGN	9/10
Game Planet	6.5/10

The Last Guy received positive reviews. IGN gave it a 9 out of 10 calling it "an outstanding title that's challenging, funny, and fresh." Gaming Target was also positive, saying that it "features just enough quirky and clever gameplay to be worth the $10" and later selecting the game for their list of "40 Games We'll Still Be Playing From 2008"
