= Hermie Hopperhead: Scrap Panic =

1995 platform game

- Developer: Yuke's (Note: Sony Computer Entertainment Japan assisted on development.)
- Publisher: Sony Computer Entertainment
- Director: Nobuhiko Tenkawa
- Producer: Tetsuji Yamamoto
- Designers: Kenji Nakamura; Yasuo Hayashi
- Programmer: Yukinori Taniguchi
- Artists: Atsuko Fukuyama; Hirofumi Morino; Katsuaki Kasai
- Composer: Kaoru Ohori
- Platform: PlayStation
- Release: JP: 29 September 1995
- Genre: Platform
- Mode: Single-player

Hermie Hopperhead: Scrap Panic (Note: Japanese: ハーミィホッパーヘッド スクラップパニック, Hepburn: Hāmyi Hoppāheddo: Sukurappu Panikku) is a platform video game developed by Yuke's and published by Sony Computer Entertainment for the PlayStation. It was released in Japan in September 1995.

== Gameplay ==
Gameplay screenshot

The player can collect stars, which act as hit points throughout the level. After 100 stars have been collected, they can be used to hatch eggs. Eggs turn into animal assistants such as chickens, dragons, penguins or turtles. Different colored eggs will turn into different animals. These assistants can aid the player by shooting, or flying, and the player can have a maximum of three animal assistants at any time.

If the player collects 400 stars, they can get an extra life.

== Plot ==
The story follows the eponymous Hermie as he witnesses an egg leap out of a trashcan and, peering inside said receptacle, falls into an alternate dimension.

== Development and release ==
Hermie Hopperhead: Scrap Panic was the second game developed by Yuke's. Japan Studio assisted on development. The game was released on September 29, 1995, for the PlayStation by Sony Computer Entertainment. It was re-released under The Best for Family budget range on December 6, 1996. Hermie Hopperhead has not been available on the Japanese PlayStation Store.

== Reception ==
Reception

Review scores
Publication	Score
Consoles +	90%
Famitsu	24/40
GameFan	89/100, 88/100, 76/100
M! Games	66%
Mega Fun	61%
Play	53%
Super Game Power	4.5/5
Dengeki PlayStation	75/100, 75/100, 70/100, 55/100
PlayStation Plus	38/100

According to Famitsu, Hermie Hopperhead: Scrap Panic sold approximately 12,622 copies during its lifetime in Japan. The game received average reviews from critics.
