= Japan Studio =

Japanese video game developer

- Native name: JAPANスタジオ
- Type: Division
- Industry: Video games
- Founded: 1 July 2005; 21 years ago
- Defunct: 1 April 2021; 5 years ago
- Fate: Merged into Team Asobi and other studios
- Successor: Team Asobi
- Headquarters: Tokyo, Japan
- Products: Shadow of the Colossus; Talkman; Siren; LocoRoco; Ape Escape; Gravity Rush; Knack; The Last Guardian; Astro Bot
- Parent: Sony Computer Entertainment (2005); PlayStation Studios (2005–2021)

Japan Studio (formerly also known as SCE Japan Studio) was a Japanese video game developer of Sony Interactive Entertainment based in Tokyo. It was best known for the Ape Escape, LocoRoco, Patapon, Gravity Rush, and Knack series, Ico, Shadow of the Colossus, Bloodborne, and Astro's Playroom. In April 2021, Japan Studio was reorganized and merged with Team Asobi and other SIE studios.

== History ==
Sony Computer Entertainment was founded in Tokyo on 16 November 1993, jointly established by Sony and Sony Music Entertainment Japan. The studio was run similar to Sony Music Entertainment Japan during its first few years, with producers seeking out creative talent and nurturing them to help develop new games. Examples of these works included PaRappa the Rapper by NanaOn-Sha, and Everybody's Golf by Camelot Software Planning.

Shuhei Yoshida oversaw the company from 1996 through 2000. Yoshida started creating teams and hired for them, while simultaneously assisting other developers for Sony-published exclusives; said teams included Sugar & Rockets, Arc Entertainment and Contrail. These teams were consolidated into the company in 2000. Sony's internal development team also developed original titles such as Ape Escape and The Legend of Dragoon, with dedicated teams led by Fumito Ueda and Keiichiro Toyama; another such team, Polys Entertainment, was spun off as Polyphony Digital due to the success of Gran Turismo. Alongside these first-party titles, the latter years of the original PlayStation saw strong third-party support, with games like Square's Final Fantasy VII and Konami's Metal Gear Solid. According to Yoshida, this led Sony into some complacency on relying on third-party games to support further consoles, and oversight and support for first-party games was less of a priority. The studio was moved to SCE Worldwide Studios in 2005, rebranding afterwards as Japan Studio; the brand first appeared in Genji: Days of the Blade, the studio's first game for the PlayStation 3. Though Japan Studio's output during the PlayStation 2 years were strong, it struggled to release successful games during the PlayStation 3 era. Yoshida attributed this to the general game development practice in Japan which he described as a "grassroots and bottom up", without a clear vision of what a final game would look like, with exceptions being for people like Kazunori Yamauchi or Fumito Ueda who possessed a specific drive towards a product. In contrast to Western video game development, Yoshida said Japan Studio's methods tended to allow games to wander. Allen Becker, who led Japan Studio starting in 2011, said that their complacency during the PlayStation 2 and PlayStation 3 era caused the studio to fall behind on updated tools and methodologies for game development.

Yoshida took over full control of Japan Studio in 2008, at the same time that the PlayStation 3 was out and Sony was preparing to launch the PlayStation 4 and PlayStation Vita. Around that time, mobile gaming and casual gaming started to become a major factor in the Asian video game market and drove competition from the consoles. Sony found that there was a lack of triple-A third-party support for these new products, and they had to turn to rely on their internal studios for game support. To get Japan Studio back on track, Sony brought in Becker, who had been working at Santa Monica Studio, to lead Japan Studio. Becker made several tough calls of the 40-some games that were in development at the time of his arrival to terminate development of those unlikely to be successful and implemented similar development processes as Sony's Western studios to get the studio back on track. Though Becker's approach, the studio was able to release shorter but cohesive titles that still reflected a Japanese approach to video games, such as Puppeteer, Rain and Knack. Also during this time, emphasis was placed on The Last Guardian, the highly anticipated third title from Ueda which had been in development for over six years, eventually released in 2016, years after Ueda left the studio and formed genDesign.

Across late 2020 and early 2021, several notable Japan Studio employees announced that they were departing the company. According to multiple sources speaking with Video Games Chronicle Sony had not renewed most of the contracts for the studio outside of those on Team Asobi because the studio was not considered profitable enough to continue with original game development. In a statement, Sony stated that, as of 1 April 2021, Japan Studio would be re-centered around Team Asobi to build on the popularity of Astro's Playroom. Before and shortly after 1 April 2021, several additional Japan Studio staff announced their departure from the studio. Team Asobi was moved into PlayStation Studios in June 2021. Shawn Layden, former chairman of SIE Worldwide Studios, stated in 2024 that Japan Studio had been suffering from "legacy malaise", having failed to recreate the successful games it once had and lacked the experience to do so again, and eliminating all but Team Asobi was akin to "trimming a bonsai", hopeful that the smaller team would be able to recapture the earlier successes. Yoshida said in a 2025 interview that with the growth of indie games, the gap widened between triple-A games and smaller games of the type Japan Studio specialized in, and it became difficult for the studio to gain approval for such concepts within Sony. Yoshida gave the example of Keiichiro Toyama, who led development of Gravity Rush 2; though he had ideas for smaller games, he could not get approval by Sony for these, so left the company in 2020, founded his own independent studio Bokeh Game Studio, and began releasing his own smaller games, starting with Slitterhead.

== List of games ==
=== 1994–1998 ===
Year	Title	Platform(s)	Ref(s).
1994	Crime Crackers	PlayStation	
1994	Motor Toon Grand Prix	PlayStation	
1995	Victory Zone	PlayStation	
1995	Rapid Reload	PlayStation	
1995	Jumping Flash!	PlayStation	
1995	Arc the Lad	PlayStation	
1995	Philosoma	PlayStation	
1995	Hermie Hopperhead: Scrap Panic	PlayStation	
1995	Wizardry VII: Crusaders of the Dark Savant	PlayStation	
1995	Sengoku Cyber: Fujimaru Jigokuhen	PlayStation	
1995	Beyond the Beyond	PlayStation	
1995	Sentou Kokka: Air Land Battle	PlayStation	
1995	Project Horned Owl	PlayStation	
1996	Jumping Flash! 2	PlayStation	
1996	Motor Toon Grand Prix 2	PlayStation	
1996	PopoloCrois Monogatari	PlayStation	
1996	Eigo no Tetsujin: Center Shiken Trial	PlayStation	
1996	Victory Zone 2	PlayStation	
1996	Arc the Lad II	PlayStation	
1996	Rurouni Kenshin: Meiji Kenyaku Romantan – Ishin Gekitou Hen	PlayStation	
1996	PaRappa the Rapper	PlayStation	
1996	Fluid	PlayStation	
1996	Wild Arms	PlayStation	
1997	I.Q.: Intelligent Qube	PlayStation	
1997	Sentou Kokka Kai: Improved	PlayStation	
1997	Alundra	PlayStation	
1997	Velldeselba Senki Tsubasa no Kunshou	PlayStation	
1997	Pet in TV	PlayStation	
1997	Baby Universe	PlayStation	
1997	Quest for Fame	PlayStation	
1997	Ghost in the Shell	PlayStation	
1997	Everybody's Golf	PlayStation	
1997	Arc the Lad: Monster Game with Casino Game	PlayStation	
1997	Linda Cube	PlayStation	
1997	The Granstream Saga	PlayStation	
1997	Crime Crackers 2	PlayStation	
1997	Elemental Gearbolt	PlayStation	
1997	Rurouni Kenshin: Meiji Kenkaku Romantan – Juu Yuushi Inbou Hen	PlayStation	
1997	Gran Turismo	PlayStation	
1998	PlayStation Comic No. 1 – Space Adventure Cobra: The Psycogun Vol. 1	PlayStation	
1998	PlayStation Comic No. 1 – Space Adventure Cobra: The Psycogun Vol. 2	PlayStation	
1998	Zero Pilot: Ginyoku no Senshi	PlayStation	
1998	PlayStation Comic No. 2 – Carol the Dark Angel	PlayStation	
1998	Tomoyasu Hotei: Stolen Song	PlayStation	
1998	Devil Dice	PlayStation	
1998	Yarudora Series Vol. 1: Double Cast	PlayStation	
1998	Souten no Shiroki Kami no Za: Great Peak	PlayStation	
1998	Yarudora Series Vol. 2: Kisetsu O Dakishimete	PlayStation	
1998	Yarudora Series Vol. 3: Sampaguita	PlayStation	
1998	Legend of Legaia	PlayStation	
1998	Yarudora Series Vol. 4: Yukiwari no Hana	PlayStation	
1998	PopoRogue	PlayStation	
1998	Wonder Trek	PlayStation	
1998	PlayStation Comic No. 3 – 2999 Game Kids	PlayStation	
1998	I.Q Final	PlayStation	

=== 1999–2000 ===
Year	Title	Platform(s)	Ref(s).
1999	Circadia	PlayStation	
1999	Pocket MuuMuu	PlayStation	
1999	PlayStation Comic No. 4 – Cobra Galaxy Knights	PlayStation	
1999	Global Force: Shin Sentou Kokka	PlayStation	
1999	Um Jammer Lammy	PlayStation	
1999	Pocket Dungeon	PlayStation	
1999	Tamago de Puzzle	PlayStation	
1999	PlayStation Comic No. 5 – Buzzer Beater (Part 1)	PlayStation	
1999	PlayStation Comic No. 5 – Buzzer Beater (Part 2)	PlayStation	
1999	Lord of Monsters	PlayStation	
1999	Ore no Shikabane o Koete Yuke	PlayStation	
1999	Ape Escape	PlayStation	
1999	The Book of Watermarks	PlayStation	
1999	Gekisou TomaRunner	PlayStation	
1999	Doko Demo Issyo	PlayStation	
1999	Everybody's Golf 2	PlayStation	
1999	Panekit	PlayStation	
1999	Wild Arms 2	PlayStation	
1999	Ore no Ryouri	PlayStation	
1999	Paqa	PlayStation	
1999	Robbit Mon Dieu	PlayStation	
1999	Brightis	PlayStation	
1999	Poketan	PlayStation	
1999	Arc the Lad III	PlayStation	
1999	Pet in TV With my dear Dog	PlayStation	
1999	Alundra 2: A New Legend Begins	PlayStation	
1999	The Legend of Dragoon	PlayStation	
1999	Vib-Ribbon	PlayStation	
1999	Love & Destroy	PlayStation	
1999	XI Jumbo	PlayStation	
2000	Pocket Jiman	PlayStation	
2000	Beat Planet Music	PlayStation	
2000	PoPoLoCrois Monogatari II	PlayStation	
2000	Chase the Express	PlayStation	
2000	Koneko mo Issyo: Doko Demo Issyo Tsuika Disc	PlayStation	
2000	Addie no Okurimono: To Moze from Addie	PlayStation	
2000	Fantavision	PlayStation 2	
2000	I.Q. Remix+: Intelligent Qube	PlayStation 2	
2000	Tiny Bullets	PlayStation	
2000	Docchi Mecha!	PlayStation	
2000	Aconcagua	PlayStation	
2000	Boku no Natsuyasumi	PlayStation	
2000	Scandal	PlayStation 2	
2000	TVDJ	PlayStation 2	
2000	Gekitotsu Toma L'Arc: TomaRunner vs L'Arc-en-Ciel	PlayStation	
2000	Bikkuri Mouse	PlayStation 2	
2000	Magical Dice Kids	PlayStation	
2000	Bealphareth	PlayStation	
2000	Gunparade March	PlayStation	
2000	Kouashi Kikou Shidan: Bein Panzer	PlayStation	
2000	Sky Odyssey	PlayStation 2	
2000	Shachou Eiyuuden: The Eagle Shooting Heroes	PlayStation	
2000	Kokohore! Pukka: Dig-a-Dig Pukka	PlayStation	
2000	Dark Cloud	PlayStation 2	
2000	Blood: The Last Vampire (Volume One)	PlayStation 2	
2000	Blood: The Last Vampire (Final Volume)	PlayStation 2	

=== 2001–2002 ===
Year	Title	Platform(s)	Ref(s).
2001	Sagashi ni Ikouyo	PlayStation 2	
2001	Tsugunai: Atonement	PlayStation 2	
2001	Extermination	PlayStation 2	
2001	Okage: Shadow King	PlayStation 2	
2001	Check-i-TV	PlayStation 2	
2001	Phase Paradox	PlayStation 2	
2001	iMode mo Issyo: Doko Demo Issyo Tsuika Disc	PlayStation	
2001	Mister Mosquito	PlayStation 2	
2001	Rimo-Cocoron	PlayStation 2	
2001	Pipo Saru 2001	PlayStation 2	
2001	Everybody's Golf 3	PlayStation 2	
2001	PaRappa the Rapper 2	PlayStation 2	
2001	Ico	PlayStation 2	
2001	SkyGunner	PlayStation 2	
2001	The Yamanote Sen: Train Simulator Real	PlayStation 2	
2001	Mad Maestro!	PlayStation 2	
2001	Genshi no Kotoba	PlayStation 2	
2001	Seigi no Mikata	PlayStation 2	
2001	Bravo Music: Christmas Edition	PlayStation 2	
2001	Legaia 2: Duel Saga	PlayStation 2	
2001	Toro to Kyuujitsu	PlayStation 2	
2001	Yoake no Mariko	PlayStation 2	
2002	Bravo Music: Chou-Meikyokuban	PlayStation 2	
2002	Yoake no Mariko 2nd Act	PlayStation 2	
2002	Dual Hearts	PlayStation 2	
2002	Wild Arms 3	PlayStation 2	
2002	Surveillance Kanshisha	PlayStation 2	
2002	Otostaz	PlayStation 2	
2002	Popolocrois: Adventure of Beginnings	PlayStation 2	
2002	Futari no Fantavision	PlayStation 2	
2002	Boku no Natsuyasumi 2	PlayStation 2	
2002	Ape Escape 2	PlayStation 2	
2002	Poinie's Poin	PlayStation 2	
2002	Space Fishermen	PlayStation 2	
2002	The Keihin Kyuukou: Train Simulator Real	PlayStation 2	
2002	Dark Chronicle	PlayStation 2	
2002	Gacharoku	PlayStation 2	
2002	Let's Bravo Music	PlayStation 2	
2002	Bombastic	PlayStation 2	

=== 2003–2005 ===
Year	Title	Platform(s)	Ref(s).
2003	Lifeline	PlayStation 2	
2003	DekaVoice	PlayStation 2	
2003	Shibai Michi	PlayStation 2	
2003	Arc the Lad: Twilight of the Spirits	PlayStation 2	
2003	Doko Demo Issyo: Watashi na Ehon	PlayStation 2	
2003	Minna no Golf Online	PlayStation 2	
2003	Ka 2: Let's Go Hawaii	PlayStation 2	
2003	Hungry Ghosts	PlayStation 2	
2003	Flipnic: Ultimate Pinball	PlayStation 2	
2003	ChainDive	PlayStation 2	
2003	Siren	PlayStation 2	
2003	Mojib-Ribbon	PlayStation 2	
2003	Kuma Uta	PlayStation 2	
2003	Wild Arms Alter Code: F	PlayStation 2	
2003	Everybody's Golf 4	PlayStation 2	
2003	Gacharoku 2: Kondo wa Sekai Isshuu yo!!	PlayStation 2	
2004	Ghost in the Shell: Stand Alone Complex	PlayStation 2	
2004	Popolocrois: Adventure of the Law of the Moon	PlayStation 2	
2004	Doko Demo Issyo: Toro to Nagareboshi	PlayStation 2	
2004	Koufuku Sousakan	PlayStation 2	
2004	Vib-Ripple	PlayStation 2	
2004	Ape Escape: Pumped & Primed	PlayStation 2	
2004	Finny the Fish & the Seven Waters	PlayStation 2	
2004	DJbox	PlayStation 2	
2004	EyeToy: Monkey Mania	PlayStation 2	
2004	Doko Demo Issyo: Toro to Ippaii	PlayStation 2	
2004	Pride of the Dragon Peace	PlayStation 2	
2004	Bakufuu Slash! Kizna Arashi	PlayStation 2	
2004	Arc the Lad: End of Darkness	PlayStation 2	
2004	Everybody's Golf Portable	PlayStation Portable	
2004	Doko Demo Issyo	PlayStation Portable	
2004	Ape Escape Academy	PlayStation Portable	
2005	PopoloCrois	PlayStation Portable	
2005	Ape Escape: On The Loose	PlayStation Portable	
2005	Wild Arms 4	PlayStation 2	
2005	Bokura no Kazoku	PlayStation 2	
2005	Bleach: Heat the Soul	PlayStation Portable	
2005	Derby Time	PlayStation Portable	
2005	Genji: Dawn of the Samurai	PlayStation 2	
2005	Kenran Butousai	PlayStation 2	
2005	Ape Escape 3	PlayStation 2	
2005	Kingdom of Paradise	PlayStation Portable	
2005	Yarudora Portable: Double Cast	PlayStation Portable	
2005	Yarudora Portable: Kisetsu wo Dakishimete	PlayStation Portable	
2005	Yarudora Portable: Sampaguita	PlayStation Portable	
2005	Yarudora Portable: Yukiwari no Hana	PlayStation Portable	
2005	Bleach: Erabareshi Tamashii	PlayStation 2	
2005	Bleach: Heat the Soul 2	PlayStation Portable	
2005	Ghost in the Shell: Stand Alone Complex	PlayStation Portable	
2005	Mawaza	PlayStation 2	
2005	Shadow of the Colossus	PlayStation 2	
2005	Fuku Fuku no Shima	PlayStation Portable	
2005	Talkman	PlayStation Portable	
2005	Rogue Galaxy	PlayStation 2	
2005	Ape Academy 2	PlayStation Portable	
2005	Work Time Fun	PlayStation Portable	

=== 2006–2007 ===
Year	Title	Platform(s)	Ref(s).
2006	Gunparade Orchestra: Shiro no Shou	PlayStation 2	
2006	Rule of Rose	PlayStation 2	
2006	Yarudora Portable: Blood The Last Vampire	PlayStation 2	
2006	Bleach: Hanatareshi Yabou	PlayStation 2	
2006	Forbidden Siren 2	PlayStation 2	
2006	Monster Kingdom: Jewel Summoner	PlayStation Portable	
2006	Blade Dancer: Lineage of Light	PlayStation Portable	
2006	Derby Time 2006	PlayStation Portable	
2006	Bomberman: Bakufuu Sentai Bombermen	PlayStation Portable	
2006	XI Coliseum	PlayStation Portable	
2006	I.Q. Mania	PlayStation Portable	
2006	Gunparade Orchestra: Midori no Shou	PlayStation 2	
2006	Talkman Euro	PlayStation Portable	
2006	Doko Demo Issyo: Let's Gakkou!	PlayStation Portable	
2006	Boku no Natsuyasumi	PlayStation Portable	
2006	Brave Story: New Traveler	PlayStation Portable	
2006	Brave Story: Wataru's Adventure	PlayStation 2	
2006	Saru! Get You! Million Monkeys	PlayStation 2	
2006	LocoRoco	PlayStation Portable	
2006	Gunparade Orchestra: Ao no Shou	PlayStation 2	
2006	Bleach: Heat the Soul 3	PlayStation Portable	
2006	Blood+: Souyoku no Battle Rondo	PlayStation 2	
2006	Blood+: Final Piece	PlayStation Portable	
2006	Everybody's Tennis	PlayStation 2	
2006	Bleach: Blade Battlers	PlayStation 2	
2006	Tenchi no Mon 2: Busouden	PlayStation Portable	
2006	Genji: Days of the Blade	PlayStation 3	
2006	Jeanne d'Arc	PlayStation Portable	
2006	PaRappa the Rapper	PlayStation Portable	
2006	Ape Escape Racing	PlayStation Portable	
2006	Wild Arms 5	PlayStation 2	
2006	P-kara	PlayStation Portable	
2007	Talkman-Shiki Shaberingual Eigkaiwa	PlayStation Portable	
2007	Kikou Souhei Armodyne	PlayStation 2	
2007	Bleach: Heat the Soul 4	PlayStation Portable	
2007	Minna no Golf Ba Vol. 1	PlayStation Portable	
2007	Folklore	PlayStation 3	
2007	Piyotama	PlayStation 3	
2007	Talkman-Shiki Shaberingual Eigkaiwa for Kids!	PlayStation Portable	
2007	Boku no Natsuyasumi 3	PlayStation 3	
2007	Everybody's Golf 5	PlayStation 3	
2007	Saru! Get You! SaruSaru Big Mission	PlayStation Portable	
2007	Minna no Golf Ba Vol. 2	PlayStation Portable	
2007	Wild Arms XF	PlayStation Portable	
2007	Rezel Cross	PlayStation Portable	
2007	LocoRoco Cocoreccho!	PlayStation 3	
2007	Bleach: Blade Battlers 2nd	PlayStation 2	
2007	Go! Sports Ski	PlayStation 3	
2007	Minna no Golf Ba Vol. 3	PlayStation Portable	
2007	The Eye of Judgment	PlayStation 3	
2007	Toy Home	PlayStation 3	
2007	Minna no Golf Ba Vol. 4	PlayStation Portable	
2007	Dark Mist	PlayStation 3	
2007	What Did I Do to Deserve This, My Lord?	PlayStation Portable	
2007	Everybody's Golf Portable 2	PlayStation Portable	
2007	Talkman Travel	PlayStation Portable	
2007	Doko Demo Issyo: Let's Gakkou! Training Hen	PlayStation Portable	
2007	Patapon	PlayStation Portable	

=== 2008–2009 ===
Year	Title	Platform(s)	Ref(s).
2008	Ape Quest	PlayStation Portable	
2008	Go! Sports Skydiving	PlayStation 3	
2008	Coded Soul	PlayStation Portable	
2008	MyStylist	PlayStation Portable	
2008	Echochrome	PlayStation Portable	
2008	Echochrome	PlayStation 3	
2008	Nippon no Asoko de	PlayStation Portable	
2008	Bleach: Heat the Soul 5	PlayStation Portable	
2008	Shiki-Tei	PlayStation 3	
2008	Siren: Blood Curse	PlayStation 3	
2008	The Last Guy	PlayStation 3	
2008	Afrika	PlayStation 3	
2008	Xam'd: Lost Memories	Video	
2008	Aquanaut's Holiday: Hidden Memories	PlayStation 3	
2008	What Did I Do to Deserve This, My Lord? 2	PlayStation Portable	
2008	Bleach: Soul Carnival	PlayStation Portable	
2008	Derby Time Online	PlayStation 3	
2008	Patapon 2	PlayStation Portable	
2008	LocoRoco 2	PlayStation Portable	
2008	Minnya no Putter Golf	PlayStation 3	
2008	White Knight Chronicles	PlayStation 3	
2009	Dress	PlayStation 3	
2009	Enkaku Sōsa: Shinjitsu e no 23 Nichikan	PlayStation Portable	
2009	Demon's Souls	PlayStation 3	
2009	Trash Panic	PlayStation 3	
2009	Bleach: Heat the Soul 6	PlayStation Portable	
2009	Juusei to Diamond	PlayStation Portable	
2009	Numblast	PlayStation Portable	
2009	Numblast	PlayStation 3	
2009	Boku no Natsuyasumi 4	PlayStation Portable	
2009	Toro to Morimori	PlayStation 3	
2009	Everybody's Stress Buster	PlayStation Portable	
2009	Echoshift	PlayStation Portable	
2009	LocoRoco Midnight Carnival	PlayStation Portable	
2009	Bleach: Soul Carnival 2	PlayStation Portable	

=== 2010–2014 ===
Year	Title	Platform(s)	Ref(s).
2010	Patchwork Heroes	PlayStation Portable	
2010	Everybody's Tennis Portable	PlayStation Portable	
2010	The Eye of Judgment: Legends	PlayStation Portable	
2010	No Heroes Allowed!	PlayStation Portable	
2010	Influence	PlayStation Portable	
2010	Piyotama	PlayStation Portable	
2010	Boku no Natsuyasumi 2	PlayStation Portable	
2010	White Knight Chronicles II	PlayStation 3	
2010	Trick×Logic Season 1	PlayStation Portable	
2010	Bleach: Heat the Soul 7	PlayStation Portable	
2010	Trick×Logic Season 2	PlayStation Portable	
2010	Kung Fu Rider	PlayStation 3	
2010	Beat Sketcher	PlayStation 3	
2010	PlayStation Move Ape Escape	PlayStation 3	
2010	Echochrome II	PlayStation 3	
2011	White Knight Chronicles: Origins	PlayStation Portable	
2011	Patapon 3	PlayStation Portable	
2011	Bleach: Soul Resurrección	PlayStation 3	
2011	The Ico & Shadow of the Colossus Collection	PlayStation 3	
2011	Ore no Shikabane o Koete Yuke	PlayStation Portable	
2011	Everybody's Golf 6	PlayStation Vita	
2011	Welcome Park	PlayStation Vita	
2012	Gravity Rush	PlayStation Vita	
2012	Tokyo Jungle	PlayStation 3	
2012	Everybody's Golf 6	PlayStation 3	
2012	Open Me!	PlayStation Vita	
2012	Paint Park	PlayStation Vita	
2013	Soul Sacrifice	PlayStation Vita	
2013	Puppeteer	PlayStation 3	
2013	Rain	PlayStation 3	
2013	Knack's Quest	Android, iOS	
2013	The Playroom	PlayStation 4	
2013	Knack	PlayStation 4	
2013	No Heroes Allowed: No Puzzles Either!	PlayStation Vita	
2014	Soul Sacrifice Delta	PlayStation Vita	
2014	Destiny of Spirits	PlayStation Vita	
2014	Freedom Wars	PlayStation Vita	
2014	Oreshika: Tainted Bloodlines	PlayStation Vita	

=== 2015–2020 ===
Year	Title	Platform(s)	Ref(s).
2015	Bloodborne	PlayStation 4	
2015	Gravity Rush Remastered	PlayStation 4	
2016	The Playroom VR	PlayStation 4	
2016	The Tomorrow Children	PlayStation 4	
2016	The Last Guardian	PlayStation 4	
2017	Gravity Rush 2	PlayStation 4	
2017	PaRappa the Rapper	PlayStation 4	
2017	LocoRoco	PlayStation 4	
2017	Everybody's Golf	PlayStation 4	
2017	Patapon	PlayStation 4	
2017	Knack II	PlayStation 4	
2017	Japan Studio VR Music Festival	PlayStation 4	
2017	No Heroes Allowed! VR	PlayStation 4	
2017	LocoRoco 2	PlayStation 4	
2018	Shadow of the Colossus	PlayStation 4	
2018	No Heroes Allowed! DASH!	Android, iOS	
2018	Astro Bot Rescue Mission	PlayStation 4	
2018	Déraciné	PlayStation 4	
2019	Everybody's Golf VR	PlayStation 4	
2019	Monkey King: Hero Is Back	PlayStation 4	
2020	Patapon 2	PlayStation 4	
2020	Astro's Playroom	PlayStation 5	
2020	Demon's Souls	PlayStation 5	

== Teams ==
Japan Studio was formed by several internal development teams, with all of them being disbanded, reorganised, or spun off into a separate studio.

The studio's unnamed main unit, its first development team, is responsible for all co-development efforts. As a primary developer, it developed the Ape Escape and LocoRoco series as well as individual titles like The Legend of Dragoon and Fantavision.

=== Polys Entertainment ===
A unit of SCEJ headed by Kazunori Yamauchi dedicated to racing games and the second established. Initially developing Motor Toon Grand Prix and its sequel, the success of its 1997 racing game Gran Turismo caused it to be formally spun off into Polyphony Digital.

=== Team Asobi ===
A development unit established in 2012 by Nicolas Doucet, who previously worked for London Studio and Saffire. It worked on the Astro Bot series in the entire span of its existence under Japan Studio. In April 2021, they were formally spun off into a separate studio under PlayStation Studios, serving as a successor to Japan Studio after its redundancy.

=== Team Ico ===
A development unit headed by Fumito Ueda and the third established in the studio. It developed Ico and Shadow of the Colossus. They were disbanded following lead game designer Fumito Ueda departing the company and establishing genDESIGN during development of The Last Guardian.

=== Team Gravity ===
A development unit formed in 1999 by former members of Team Silent, the creators of Silent Hill. The team developed games in the Siren and Gravity Rush series and was led by game designer and director Keiichiro Toyama, who, alongside designers Kazunobu Sato and Junya Okura, left Japan Studio in late 2020 to form Bokeh Game Studio.
