= Sony Interactive Entertainment =

American video game company

Sony Interactive Entertainment LLC
- Logo used since 2016

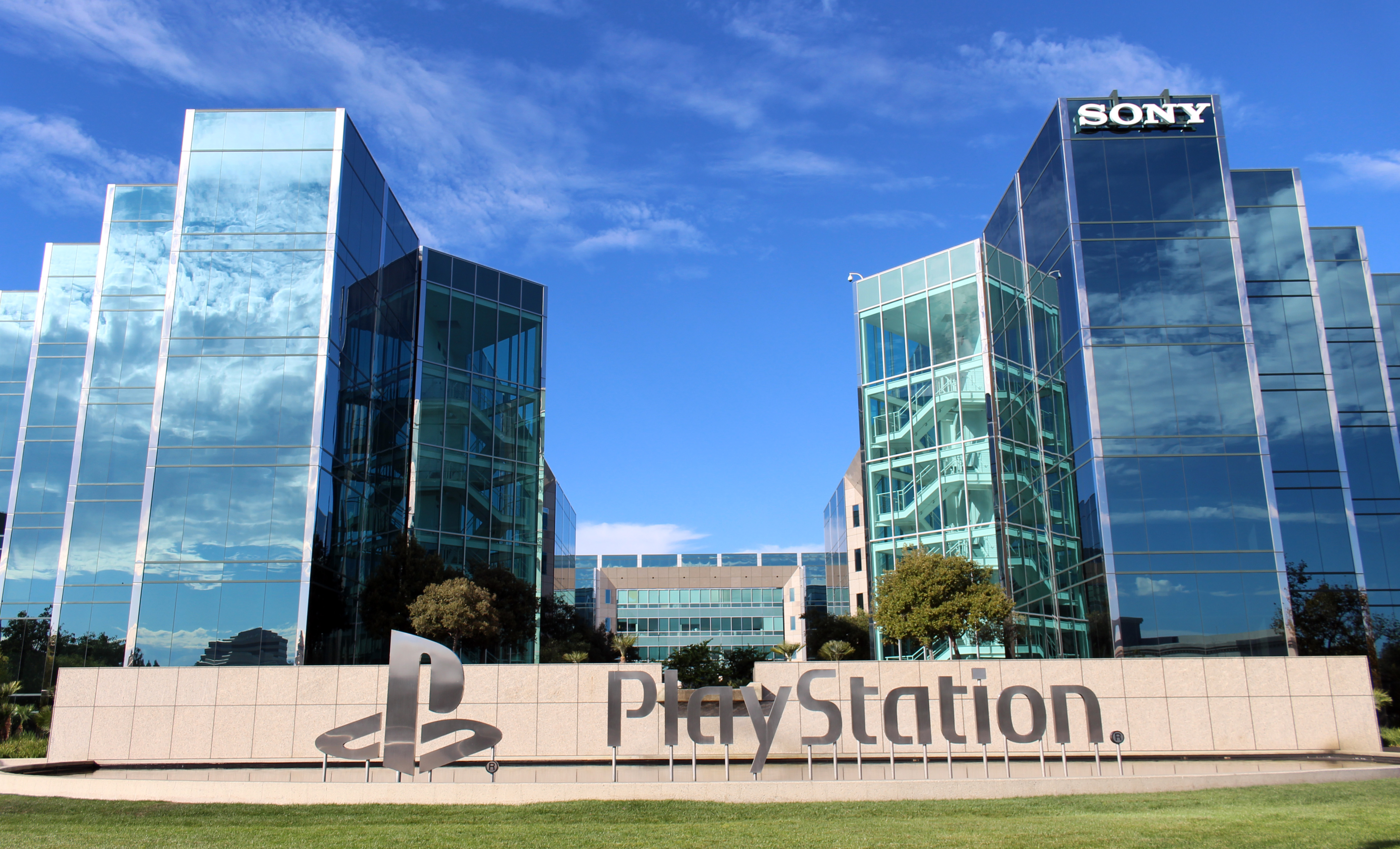
- SIE's headquarters in San Mateo, California
- Formerly: Sony Computer Entertainment Inc. (1993–2016)
- Type: Subsidiary
- Industry: Video games
- Predecessors: Sony Interactive Entertainment; Sony Computer Entertainment; Sony Network Entertainment International
- Founded: 1993; 33 years ago (as Sony Computer Entertainment); April 1, 2016; 10 years ago (as Sony Interactive Entertainment)
- Headquarters: San Mateo, California, United States 37°33′38″N 122°17′03″W
- Key people: Hideaki Nishino (president and CEO)
- Products: PlayStation video game consoles
- Production output: Hardware ▼16 million; Software ▲317.9 million; (FY25)
- Services: PlayStation Network; PlayStation Store; PlayStation Plus
- Revenue: ▼US$31.09 billion (FY25)
- Operating income: ▲US$3.07 billion (FY25)
- Number of employees: 12,100 (2025)
- Parent: Sony Group Corporation
- Divisions: PlayStation Studios; PlayStation Mobile; PlayStation Publishing
- Subsidiaries: Audeze; Audiokinetic; Bungie; PlayStation Productions
- ASN: 33353
- Website: sonyinteractive.com

Sony Interactive Entertainment LLC (SIE) is an American, Japanese-owned, video game and digital entertainment company of Japanese conglomerate Sony Group Corporation. It primarily operates the PlayStation brand of video game consoles and products. It is also the world's largest company in the video game industry based on its equity investments and revenue.

In 1993, Sony and Sony Music Entertainment Japan jointly established Sony Computer Entertainment Inc. (SCE) in Tokyo, which released the video game console PlayStation in Japan the following year and subsequently in the United States and Europe the year after. In 2010, Sony underwent a corporate split and established Sony Network Entertainment International (SNEI) in California, which provided gaming-related services through PlayStation Network as well as other media through Sony Entertainment Network, including the sale of game titles and content on the PlayStation Store, as well as offering PlayStation Plus and Media Go. In 2016, SCE and SNEI jointly established Sony Interactive Entertainment and it was announced the new entity would be headquartered in the United States.

== History ==
=== Sony Computer Entertainment founding, PlayStation release, and North American expansion (1993–2005) ===
Sony Computer Entertainment logo (1993–2016)

Sony Computer Entertainment, Inc. (SCEI) was jointly established in Tokyo by Sony and its subsidiary Sony Music Entertainment Japan in 1993 to handle the company's ventures into the video game industry. The original PlayStation console was released on December 3, 1994, in Japan. The company's North American operations, Sony Computer Entertainment of America (SCEA), were originally established in May 1994 as a division of Sony Electronic Publishing. Located in Foster City, California, the North American office was originally headed by Steve Race. Sony Computer Entertainment Europe was founded in London, England, on January 6, 1995 as a unit of Sony Electronic Publishing Ltd, original development staff had little to no experience in the video game industry, with most of them being recent college graduates according to Next Generation magazine.

In the months prior to the release of the PlayStation in Western markets, the operations were restructured: All video game marketing from Sony Imagesoft was folded into SCEA in July 1995, with most affected employees transferred from Santa Monica to Foster City. On August 7, 1995, Race unexpectedly resigned and was named CEO of Spectrum HoloByte three days later. He was replaced by Sony Electronics veteran Martin Homlish. This proved to be the beginning of a run of exceptional managerial turnover. The PS console was released in the United States on September 9, 1995. As part of a worldwide restructuring at the beginning of 1997, the American and European divisions of SCE were both re-established as wholly owned subsidiaries of SCEI, with Sony Interactive Entertainment (formerly Sony Electronic Publishing) being folded as well to SCEI on January 6, 1997, with the game's copyrights and trademarks of franchises like Jet Moto and Twisted Metal being transferred from SIE to SCE. In 1998, Saeki Masatsuka was promoted to executive officer and executive vice president of the company.

In 1998, Sony Interactive Studios America, the development division, was spun off from SCEA, with the intent to became an autonomous and independent video game publisher and brand label for SCEA in a similar manner Psygnosis was operating from SCEE and the video game division of Sony Music Entertainment Japan operating from SCEI, and given its own marketing team, with SCEA handling distribution functions, after having its titles being published and marketed by SCEA and later on, SISA was renamed 989 Studios, and its sports label was renamed to 989 Sports.

In 1998, Sony Computer Entertainment America signed a deal with Disney Interactive to publish titles based on the films A Bug's Life and Tarzan exclusively on the PlayStation console. In 1999, ahead of the launch of the PlayStation 2, autonomous Sony-owned video game company Psygnosis was merged into Sony Computer Entertainment Europe, while in 2000, fellow Sony-owned video game label 989 Studios was merged into Sony Computer Entertainment America. Around the same time, the North American branch of Psygnosis was folded into SCEA and Midway Home Entertainment (a division of Midway Games) acquired the leftover titles on its PlayStation lineup, while SCEA is planning on to publish the PS2 titles inherited from Psygnosis. The sports division, 989 Sports, became SCEA Sports Studio in 2005.

The launch of the second PS console, the PlayStation 2 was released in Japan on March 4, 2000, and the U.S. on October 26, 2000. In May 2001, the SCEA/Disney deal was extended to include titles based on Atlantis: The Lost Empire, Monsters, Inc., Treasure Planet, Lilo & Stitch, and Peter Pan: Return to Never Land on the PlayStation and PlayStation 2. On July 1, 2002, chairman of SCEI, Shigeo Maruyama, was replaced by Tamotsu Iba as chairman. Jack Tretton and Phil Harrison were also promoted to senior vice presidents of SCE. In 2002, Sony Computer Entertainment Europe signed a deal with Bam! Entertainment to publish two Psygnosis-inherited titles WipeOut Fusion and Dropship in North America. In 2004, after the release of wordimagesoundplay, SME Japan's video game division was folded into SCEI. The PlayStation Portable (PSP) was SCEI's first foray into the small handheld console market. Its development was first announced during SCE's E3 conference in 2003, and it was officially unveiled during their E3 conference on May 11, 2004. The system was released in Japan on December 12, 2004, in North America on March 24, 2005, and in Europe and Australia on September 1, 2005.

=== Creation of SCE Worldwide Studios, acquisitions, and restructure (2005–2011) ===
On September 1, 2005, SCEI formed SCE Worldwide Studios, a single internal entity to oversee all wholly owned development studios within SCEI. It became responsible for the creative and strategic direction of development and production of all computer entertainment software by all SCEI-owned studios—all software is produced exclusively for the PS family of consoles. Shuhei Yoshida was named as president of Worldwide Studios on May 16, 2008, replacing Kazuo Hirai, who was serving interim after Harrison left the company in early 2008.

On December 8, 2005, video game developer Guerrilla Games, developers of the Killzone series, was acquired by Sony Computer Entertainment as part of Worldwide Studios. On January 24, 2006, video game developer Zipper Interactive, developers of the Socom series, was acquired by Sony Computer Entertainment as part of Worldwide Studios.

In March 2006, Sony announced the online network for its forthcoming PlayStation 3 (PS3) system at the 2006 PlayStation Business Briefing meeting in Tokyo, Japan, tentatively named "PlayStation Network Platform" and eventually called just PlayStation Network (PSN). Sony also stated that the service would always be connected, free, and include multiplayer support.

The launch date for the PS3 was announced by Hirai at the pre-E3 conference held at the Sony Pictures Studios in Culver City, California, on May 8, 2006. The PS3 was released in Japan on November 11, 2006, and the U.S. date was November 17, 2006. The PSN was also launched in November 2006.

On November 30, 2006, president of SCEI, Ken Kutaragi, was appointed as chairman of SCEI, while Hirai, then president of SCEA, was promoted to president of SCEI. On April 26, 2007, Ken Kutaragi resigned from his position as chairman of SCEI and group CEO, passing on his duties to the recently appointed president of SCE, Hirai.

On September 20, 2007, video game developers Evolution Studios and Bigbig Studios, creators of the MotorStorm series, were acquired by Sony Computer Entertainment as part of Worldwide Studios.

On April 15, 2009, David Reeves, president and CEO of SCE Europe, announced his forthcoming resignation from his post. He had joined the company in 1995 and was appointed as chairman of SCEE in 2003, and then president in 2005. His role of president and CEO of SCEE would be taken over by Andrew House, who joined Sony Corporation in 1990. The PSP Go was released on October 1, 2009, for North America and Europe, and on November 1, 2009, for Japan.

On April 1, 2010, SCEI was restructured to bring together Sony's mobile electronics and personal computers divisions. The main Japanese division of SCEI was temporarily renamed "SNE Platform Inc." (SNEP) on April 1, 2010, and was split into two divisions that focused on different aspects: "Sony Computer Entertainment, Inc.", consisting of 1,300 employees who focused on the console business, and the network service business consisting of 60 to 70 employees. The network service business of SCEI was absorbed into Sony Corp's Network Products & Service Group (NPSG), which had already been headed by Hirai since April 2009. The original SCEI was then dissolved after the restructuring.

The North American and European branches of SCEI were affected by the restructuring, and remained as SCEA and SCEE. Hirai, by that time SCEI CEO and Sony Corporation EVP, led both departments. Also on the same date, Sony Network Entertainment International (SNEI) was founded with Tim Schaaff becoming its president. SNEI would be in charge of operating the PlayStation Network and would also offer the Media Go software.

On March 2, 2010, video game developer Media Molecule, developers of the PlayStation 3 game LittleBigPlanet, was acquired by SCEI as part of Worldwide Studios. On August 23, 2010, the headquarters of the company moved from Minami-Aoyama to the Sony City (Sony Corporation's headquarters) in Kōnan, Minato, Tokyo. On April 20, 2011, SNEI and SCEI were both the victim of an attack on its PlayStation Network system, which also affected its online division, Sony Online Entertainment. On August 1, 2011, video game developer Sucker Punch Productions, developers of the Sly Cooper and Infamous series, was also acquired.

=== Launch of PlayStation Vita and PlayStation 4, and SEN (2011–2016) ===
In August 2011, the Sony Entertainment Network was announced, offering music and video services as well as the PlayStation Network. From February 8, 2012, PSN accounts were converted into SEN accounts to be used with all services on offer by the Sony Entertainment Network.

In January 2012, BigBig Studios was closed and Cambridge Studio—renamed Guerrilla Cambridge—becoming a sister studio of Guerrilla Games. In March 2012, Zipper Interactive, developers of the SOCOM series, MAG and Unit 13, was closed. On June 25, 2012, Hirai retired as chairman of Sony Computer Entertainment; however, he remains on the board of directors.

On July 2, 2012, Sony Computer Entertainment acquired Gaikai, a cloud-based gaming service. In August 2012, Studio Liverpool, developer of the Wipeout and Formula One series, was closed. In August 2012, Sony Computer Entertainment announced PlayStation Mobile for Vita and PlayStation certified devices, with developers such as THQ, Team17 and Action Button Entertainment signed up.

On December 31, 2012, Tim Schaaff retired as president of Sony Network Entertainment International, but remained on the company's board. On April 2, 2013, Sony announced to merge Sony Computer Entertainment's Asian operations with its Japanese operations as Sony Computer Entertainment Japan Asia.

A press release was published on August 20, 2013, announcing the release date of the PlayStation 4 (PS4) console. On that date, SCEI introduced the CUH-1000A series system, and announced the launch date as November 15, 2013, for North American markets and November 29, 2013, for European, Australasian and Central and South American markets.

Following a January 2014 announcement by the Chinese government that the country's 14-year game console ban would be lifted, the PS4 was scheduled to be the first Sony video game console to be officially and legally released in China since the PlayStation 2.

On March 6, 2014, Sony Computer Entertainment of America President and CEO, Tretton, announced he was resigning from his position at the end of the month, citing a mutual agreement between himself and SCEA for the cessation of his contract. Tretton had worked at SCEA since 1995 and was a founding member of the company's executive team. He was involved in the launch of all PlayStation platforms in North America, including the original PlayStation, PS2, PSP, PS3, PSN, PS Vita, and PS4. Tretton was replaced by Shawn Layden, who was the vice-president and chief operating officer (COO) of Sony Network Entertainment International, effective April 1, 2014. On April 2, 2015, it was announced that Sony Computer Entertainment had acquired the intellectual property of the cloud gaming service OnLive, and that its services would cease by the end of the month.

In March 2015, Sony Network Entertainment International and Sony Computer Entertainment launched PlayStation Vue (PSVue) in the U.S., Sony's first-ever cloud-based television service. The beta version was only offered on an invite-only basis for PS3 and PS4 users from November 2014 prior to its official launch. Sony signed deals with major networks, including CBS, Discovery, Fox, and Viacom, so that users can view live streaming video, as well as catch up and on-demand content, from more than 75 channels, such as Comedy Central and Nickelodeon. Although pricing and release dates for other regions was not publicized, Sony confirmed that PSVue will eventually be available on iPad, followed by other Sony and non-Sony devices.

=== Restructuring as Sony Interactive Entertainment (2016–present) ===
On January 26, 2016, Sony announced the reorganization and integration of Sony Computer Entertainment (SCE) and Sony Network Entertainment International (SNEI), establishing a new company called Sony Interactive Entertainment LLC (SIE) on April 1, 2016, under the umbrella of Sony Corporation of America. Unlike the former SCE, SIE is headquartered in San Mateo, California — where SNEI was based at — and oversees the entire PlayStation brand, regional subsidiaries, and content business. SIE's Japanese branch, Sony Interactive Entertainment Inc, was established as a direct subsidiary of Sony Corporation. On March 24, 2016, Sony announced the establishment of ForwardWorks, a new studio dedicated to producing "full-fledged" games based on Sony intellectual properties for mobile platforms such as smartphones; it would later develop Disgaea RPG and is currently supporting Everybody's Golf on Android and iOS. ForwardWorks was later moved to another division within Sony becoming a subsidiary to Sony Music and therefore no longer a unit within Sony Interactive Entertainment.

It was reported in December 2016 by multiple news outlets that Sony was considering restructuring its U.S. operations by merging its TV and film business with SIE. According to the reports, such a restructuring would have placed Sony Pictures under Sony Interactive's CEO, Andrew House, though House would not have taken over day-to-day operations of the film studio. According to one report, Sony was set to make a final decision on the possibility of the merger of the TV, film, and gaming businesses by the end of its fiscal year in March of the following year (2017). However, judging by Sony's activity in 2017, the rumored merger never materialized.

On January 8, 2019, Sony announced that the company had entered into a definitive agreement for Sony Interactive Entertainment to acquire Audiokinetic.

On March 20, 2019, Sony Interactive Entertainment launched the educational video game platform toio in Japan.

On May 20, 2019, Sony Interactive Entertainment announced that the company had launched PlayStation Productions, a production studio that adapts the company's extensive catalogue of video game titles for film and television. The new venture is headed by Asad Qizilbash and overseen by Shawn Layden, chairman of Worldwide Studios.

On August 19, 2019, Sony Interactive Entertainment announced that the company had entered into definitive agreements to acquire Insomniac Games. The acquisition was completed on November 15, 2019, where Sony paid ¥24,895 million (US$229 million) in cash.

On November 8, 2019, Gobind Singh Deo, Malaysia's Minister of Communications and Multimedia, announced that Sony Interactive Entertainment would open a new development office in the country as in 2020 to provide art and animation as part of Worldwide Studios' efforts to make exclusive games for PlayStation consoles. The studio will be Sony Interactive Entertainment's first studio in Southeast Asia.

The PlayStation Studios logo

SIE announced the formation of PlayStation Studios in May 2020 to be formally introduced alongside the PlayStation 5 later in 2020. PlayStation Studios will serve as an umbrella organization for its first-party game development studios, including Naughty Dog, Insomniac, Santa Monica Studio, Media Molecule and Guerrilla Games, as well as used for branding on games developed by studios brought in by Sony in work-for-hire situations. Sony plans to use the "PlayStation Studios" branding on both PlayStation 5 and new PlayStation 4 games to help with consumer recognition, though the branding was not ready for some of Sony's mid-2020 releases like The Last of Us Part II.

SIE's parent Sony bought a minority stake in Epic Games for $250 million in July 2020, giving the company about a 1.4% stake in Epic. The investment came after Sony helped with Epic's development of new technologies in its Unreal Engine 5, which it was positioning for use in powering games on the upcoming PlayStation 5 to take advantage of its high speed internal storage solutions for in-game streaming.

In March 2021, SIE announced that it and RTS acquired the assets and properties of the Evolution Championship Series as a joint venture.

On April 13, 2021, Epic Games announced that it received an additional $200 million strategic investment from SIE's parent Sony Group Corporation.

On May 3, 2021, Sony Interactive Entertainment announced the acquisition of a minority stake in Discord, which would be integrated into the PlayStation Network by early 2022.

On June 29, 2021, Sony Interactive Entertainment announced the acquisition of Housemarque.

On July 1, 2021, Sony Interactive Entertainment announced the acquisition of Nixxes Software. Jim Ryan said later that month that they plan to work with Nixxes to release more of their PlayStation games to personal computers.

On September 8, 2021, Sony Interactive Entertainment announced the acquisition of Firesprite, a Liverpool-based developer with over 250 employees. The studio has multiple projects in development, with the projects focusing on genres outside the core offerings of PlayStation Studios. On September 29, 2021, Firesprite announced that it had acquired Fabrik Games, bringing the studio's headcount to 265.

On September 30, 2021, Sony Interactive Entertainment announced that Bluepoint Games had joined PlayStation Studios, with Bluepoint working on original content instead of remaking an older game.

On November 4, 2021, Sony Interactive Entertainment acquired a 5% stake in the video game publisher Devolver Digital.

On December 10, 2021, Sony Interactive Entertainment announced the acquisition of the Seattle-based studio Valkyrie Entertainment.

Sony Interactive Entertainment announced its intent to purchase Bungie for $3.6 billion in January 2022. This deal closed on July 15, 2022. Under terms of this deal, Bungie remained an independent development studio and publisher, allowing Bungie to pursue development outside Sony's platforms, and was intended to help bolster live service games for SIE.

Sony Interactive Entertainment acquired Jade Raymond's Haven Studios in March 2022 and incorporating it as part of PlayStation Studios, making the studio Sony's first development team in Canada.

On July 18, 2022, Sony Interactive Entertainment and Repeat.gg announced that Sony Interactive Entertainment had acquired Repeat.gg.

On August 29, 2022, Sony Interactive Entertainment announced that it had acquired Savage Game Studios, a mobile game development studio with offices in Helsinki and Berlin. Savage Game Studios joined the newly created PlayStation Studios Mobile Division, an independent operation from console development.

On August 31, 2022, it was announced that Sony Interactive Entertainment has acquired a 14.09% stake in FromSoftware.

On April 20, 2023, Sony Interactive Entertainment announced that it had acquired Firewalk Studios from ProbablyMonster.

On August 24, 2023, Sony Interactive Entertainment announced it had acquired audio company Audeze, who makes gaming headphones.

On November 2, 2023, Sony Interactive Entertainment announced that it would acquire UK-based iSize, a company which specializes in building AI-powered solutions to improve video delivery.

In the UK in November 2023, SIE was unable to dismiss a lawsuit from consumer advocates challenging the requirement that all digital content for the PlayStation systems be sold through the PlayStation Store along with the 30% fee that SIE takes for each sale. The suit has potential for damages up to £6.3 billion (US$7.9 billion).

On November 27, 2023, SIE signed Shift Up studio to become their first Korean second-party developers.

On November 28, 2023, SIE and Korean publisher NCSoft signed a strategic global partnership.

On February 27, 2024, SIE announced it would lay off 900 employees, approximately 8% of its workforce, as part of a restructuring operation. Additionally, President and CEO Jim Ryan announced the London Studio will close in response to the changes in the industry.

Having announced his retirement in September 2023, Jim Ryan left Sony at the end of March 2024. Sony Group president Hiroki Totoki became chairman of SIE on October 1, 2023, and interim CEO from April 1, 2024, following Ryan's departure. On May 13, 2024, Sony Interactive Entertainment unveiled a new leadership structure effective June 1, 2024, with Hermen Hulst and Hideaki Nishino becoming CEOs of separate divisions within SIE. Hulst will be the CEO of the Studio Business Group which he will oversee PlayStation's video game development as well as adaptations into other mediums such as television and film while Nishino will be CEO of the Platform Business Group, in which he will oversee hardware, technology, accessories, PlayStation Network and relationships with other developers and publishers. Both will report to SIE chairman Hiroki Totoki.

On January 28, 2025, it was announced that Hiroki Totoki would be promoted to CEO of Sony Group Corporation and Hideaki Nishino would be promoted to president and CEO of Sony Interactive Entertainment, with Hulst remaining the CEO of Studio Business Group and will report to Nishino. In addition, Lin Tao, currently Senior Vice President of Finance, Corporate Development and Strategy, would leave SIE to become CFO of Sony Group Corporation. The management changes went into effect on April 1, 2025.

In March 2026, it was reported that SIE would be phasing out "PlayStation Network" and "PSN" from its branding by September 2026. According to Insider Gaming, an email sent to developers said the change would be "purely visual" and that the intention behind the decision is to "properly capture the breadth of our evolving digital services."

Sony announced in July 2026 that it was ending production of physical discs for the PlayStation consoles by January 2028. The company called it a "natural direction" as they found consumers preferred downloading games over physical media; analysts estimated digital sales contributed to 80% of total game purchases on the PlayStation platform. Other publishers will be able to order discs after January 2028, but only for games published before this date. Sony's decision raised concerns related to video game preservation and game ownership with the end of physical media for game distribution. Further concerns were raised due to the limited availability of the PlayStation Store for purchasing digital games, which is unavailable in 62% of countries. In its July 2026 earnings call, CFO Lin Tao said the company was moving "cautiously" forward with its plan to go fully digital, acknowledging there are users and other agencies that still prefer disc-based content.

== Corporate affairs ==
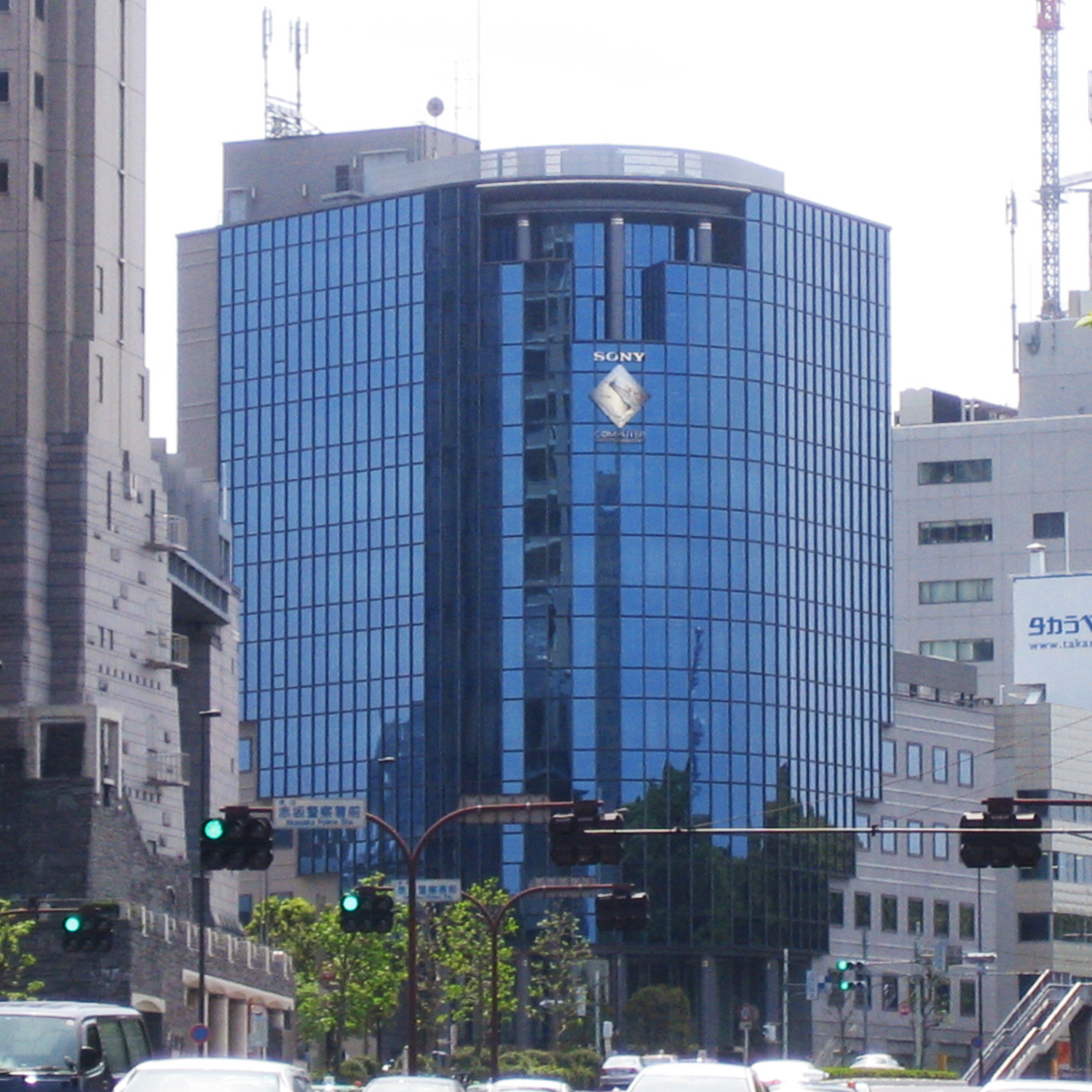
Former Sony Computer Entertainment headquarters in Akasaka, Minato, Tokyo

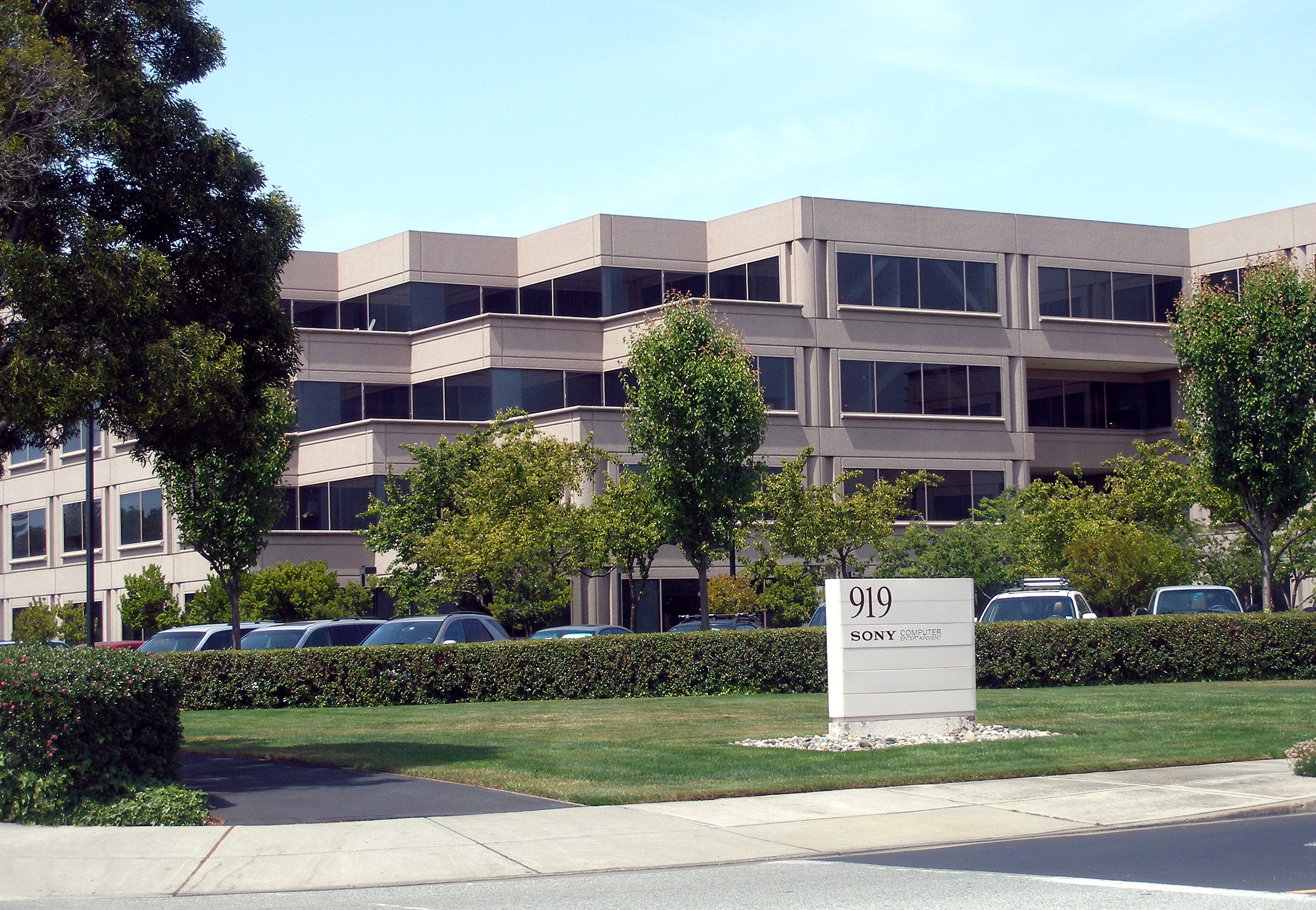
Former Sony Computer Entertainment America headquarters in Foster City, California, United States

Hideaki Nishino serves as president and CEO of SIE. The first and longest-serving CEO of SIE is Ken Kutaragi, who served from 1993 to 2007. He is also known as the "Father of the PlayStation", and was honorary chairman of SIE for another four years after he resigned as CEO. Kutaragi has remained at Sony as a senior technology advisor. As of June 1, 2024, Hermen Hulst is the CEO of the Studio Business Group.

=== Offices ===
SIE currently has eight main offices around the world. They are as follows:

- Sony Interactive Entertainment LLC and Sony Interactive Entertainment America LLC (San Mateo, California) — the global and regional headquarters for the Americas (except Cuba and the Caribbean countries)
- Sony Interactive Entertainment Europe Limited (London, England, United Kingdom) — controls operations in Europe, South Africa, Middle East, India, New Zealand and Turkey (except Russia, Egypt, Belarus and Baltic countries)
- Sony Interactive Entertainment Inc. and Sony Interactive Entertainment Japan Asia (Minato, Tokyo, Japan) — controls operations in Japan and was also formerly the regional headquarters for Sony Computer Entertainment Inc.
- Sony Interactive Entertainment Australia Pty. Ltd. (Sydney, New South Wales, Australia) — controls Australian operations. Formerly a subsidiary of Sony Interactive Entertainment Europe and previously oversaw operations in New Zealand.
- Sony Interactive Entertainment Korea (Seoul, South Korea) — controls South Korean operations
- Sony Interactive Entertainment Singapore (Singapore) — controls Southeast Asia operations
- Sony Interactive Entertainment Taiwan (Taipei, Taiwan) — controls Taiwanese operations
- Sony Interactive Entertainment Shanghai (Shanghai, China) — controls operations in mainland China
- Sony Interactive Entertainment Hong Kong (Hong Kong) — controls operations around Hong Kong and Macau

SIE also has smaller offices and distribution centers in Los Angeles, California, San Diego, California; Toronto, Ontario; Adelaide, South Australia; Melbourne, Victoria; Seoul, South Korea; Singapore; Shanghai, China and Liverpool, England.

== Hardware ==
PlayStation brand logo

=== PlayStation ===
SCEI produces the PlayStation line of video game hardware that consists of consoles and handhelds. Sony's first wide home console release, the PlayStation (codenamed "PSX" during development), was initially designed to be a CD-ROM drive add-on for Nintendo's Super NES (a.k.a. "Super Famicom" in Japan) video game console, in response to add-ons for competing platforms such as the TurboGrafx-CD and the Sega CD (sold as the PC Engine CD-ROM² System and Mega CD in Japan respectively). When the prospect of releasing the system as an add-on dissolved, Sony redesigned the machine into a standalone unit.

The PlayStation was released in Japan on December 3, 1994, and later in North America on September 9, 1995. By the end of the console 12-year production cycle, the PlayStation had sold 102 million units.

=== PlayStation 2 ===
SCEI's second home console, the PlayStation 2 (PS2) was released in Japan on March 4, 2000, and later in North America and Europe in October and November 2000, respectively. The PS2 is powered by a proprietary central processing unit, the Emotion Engine, and was the first video game console to have DVD playback functionality and also backwards compatibility with the original PlayStation games included out of the box.

The PS2 consisted of a DVD drive and retailed in the U.S. for US$299. SCEI received heavy criticism after the launch of the PS2 due to the games released as part of the launch, difficulties that it presented for video game designers, and users who struggled to port Sega Dreamcast games to the system. However, despite these complaints, the PlayStation 2 received widespread support from third party developers throughout its lifespan on the market.

On December 28, 2012, Sony confirmed that it would cease production of the PS2 through a gradual process that started in Japan—the continuing popularity of the console in markets like Brazil and India meant that PS2 products would still be shipped, while games for the console were released in March 2013. The PS2 stands as the best-selling home video game console in history, with a total of 155 million consoles sold.

Writing for the ExtremeTech website at the end of 2012, James Plafke described the PS2 as revolutionary and proclaimed that the console "turn[ed] the gaming industry on its head":

Aside from being the "first" next-gen console, as well as providing many, many people with their first DVD player, the PlayStation 2 launched in something of a Golden Age of the non-PC gaming industry. Gaming tech was becoming extremely sophisticated ... Sony seemingly knew the exact route toward popularity, turning the console with the least powerful hardware of that generation into a juggernaut of success.

=== PlayStation Portable ===
The PlayStation Portable (PSP) was SCEI's first foray into the small handheld console market. Its development was first announced during SCE's E3 conference in 2003, and it was officially unveiled during their E3 conference on May 11, 2004. The system was released in Japan on December 12, 2004, in North America on March 24, 2005, and in Europe and Australia on September 1, 2005. The system received five models, with new features including smaller size, more internal memory, a better quality LCD screen and lighter weight. Hardware shipments of the PSP ended worldwide in 2014.

=== PlayStation 3 ===
The launch date for the PS3 was announced by Hirai at the pre-E3 conference held at Sony Pictures Studios in Los Angeles, California, on May 8, 2006. The PS3 was released in Japan on November 11, 2006, and the U.S. date was November 17, 2006. Technology journalists observed that Sony had followed what Microsoft did with the Xbox 360, and produced the PS3 in two versions: one with a 20GB hard drive and the other with a 60GB hard drive.

The PS3 utilizes a unique processing architecture, the Cell microprocessor, a proprietary technology developed by Sony in conjunction with Toshiba and IBM. The graphics processing unit, the RSX 'Reality Synthesizer', was co-developed by Nvidia and Sony. Several variations of the PS3 have been released, each with slight hardware and software differences, and each denoted by the varying size of the included hard disk drive.

=== PlayStation Vita ===
The PS Vita is the successor to the PlayStation Portable. It was released in Japan and other parts of Asia on December 17, 2011, and then in Europe, Australia and North America on February 22, 2012.

Internally, the Vita featured a 4-core ARM Cortex-A9 MPCore processor and a 4-core SGX543MP4+ graphics processing unit, as well as LiveArea software as its main user interface, which succeeds the XrossMediaBar.

On March 1, 2019, Sony ended production of the system and physical cartridge games.

=== PlayStation 4 ===
The PS4 was announced as the successor to the PS3 and was launched in North America on November 15, 2013, in Europe on November 29, 2013 and in Japan on February 23, 2014.

Described by Sony as a "next generation" console, the PS4 included features such as enhanced social capabilities, second-screen options involving devices like the handheld PlayStation Vita, a membership service and compatibility with the Twitch live streaming platform.

Following a January 2014 announcement by the Chinese government that the country's 14-year game console ban would be lifted, the PS4 was scheduled to be the first Sony video game console to be officially and legally released in China since the PlayStation 2—the ban was enacted in 2000 to protect the mental health of young people. Around 70 game developers, including Ubisoft and Koei, will service Chinese PlayStation users.

The Chinese release dates and price details were announced in early December, with January 11, 2015, confirmed by SCEI. The makers announced that both the PS4 and Vita consoles will be released in China, and the former's package will also consist of a 500GB and 1TB hard drive and controller.

The 20th anniversary of the original PS console was celebrated on December 6, 2014, with the release of a limited-edition, anniversary-edition PlayStation 4 with an aesthetic design that recalled the original 1994 PlayStation.

=== PlayStation 5 ===
The PS5 was announced to succeed the PS4 in 2019, and released in Australia, Japan, New Zealand, North America, and South Korea on November 12, 2020, with a further worldwide release on November 19, 2020.

== Software and franchises ==
=== Development studios ===
SIE has maintained several in-house studios since 2005, with the most recent move to brand these as PlayStation Studios starting in 2020. All of these studios develop PlayStation console-exclusive games for Sony.

The table below shows the current and former studios associated with SIE, and their respective franchises or games of note. In addition to those listed below, Bungie has operated as an independent studio and publisher under SIE since July 2022.

First-party (PlayStation Studios)
Asia:
- Team Asobi – Astro Bot series
- Polyphony Digital – Gran Turismo series – Motor Toon Grand Prix series – Tourist Trophy – Omega Boost

North America:

- Insomniac Games – Spyro the Dragon series – Ratchet & Clank series – Resistance series – Marvel's Spider-Man series
- Naughty Dog – Crash Bandicoot series – Jak and Daxter series – Uncharted series – The Last of Us series – Intergalactic: The Heretic Prophet
- Bend Studio – Syphon Filter series – Resistance: Retribution – Uncharted: Golden Abyss – Uncharted: Fight for Fortune – Days Gone
- San Diego Studio – MLB: The Show series – NBA series – ModNation Racers series – Sports Champions series – The Mark of Kri – Pain – High Velocity Bowling – Pinball Heroes – Medieval Moves: Deadmund's Quest – LittleBigPlanet Karting
- Santa Monica Studio – Kinetica – God of War series
- Sucker Punch Productions – Sly Cooper series – Infamous series – Ghost of Tsushima – Ghost of Yōtei
- Haven Studios – Support for first-party titles
- teamLFG

Europe:

- Guerrilla Games – Killzone series – Horizon series
- Media Molecule – LittleBigPlanet series – Tearaway – Tearaway Unfolded – Dreams
- Housemarque – Stardust series – Dead Nation – Resogun – Nex Machina – Returnal – Saros
- Firesprite – The Playroom – Run Sackboy! Run! – Air Force Special Ops: Nightfall – The Persistence – Horizon Call of the Mountain – Until Dawn 2

Game development support units:

- XDev XDev collaborates with independent development studios across America, Europe and Asia to produce content to PlayStation platforms all over the world – Until Dawn – Beyond: Two Souls – Detroit: Become Human – Rise of the Ronin – Stellar Blade – Marvel Tokon: Fighting Souls – LittleBigPlanet series – Death Stranding series – Buzz! series – Invizimals series – MotorStorm series – Killzone series – Pursuit Force series – Start the Party! series – Super Stardust series – Hustle Kings series – Super Rub 'a' Dub – Heavenly Sword – Rag Doll Kung Fu: Fists of Plastic – Crash Commando – Heavy Rain – Tumble – The Fight: Lights Out – Dead Nation – Move Fitness – Reality Fighters – Table Top Tanks – PulzAR – Table Ice Hockey – Smart As... – When Vikings Attack! – Table Mini Golf – Beyond: Two Souls – Wonderbook: Walking with Dinosaurs – Tearaway – Resogun – Dead Nation: Apocalypse Edition – Lemmings Touch – PlayStation Vita Pets – Murasaki Baby – Run Sackboy! Run! – The Hungry Horde – BigFest – Tearaway Unfolded – Rime – Alienation – Wild – Shadow of the Beast
- San Mateo Studio – Syphon Filter series – Jak and Daxter series – Socom series – Sly Cooper series – Ratchet & Clank series – Resistance series – Uncharted series – Infamous series – Jet Li: Rise to Honor – CounterSpy – Helldivers
- Nixxes Software – Dutch studio which focuses on porting games to other platforms while also supporting development of games for a variety of platforms – Horizon series (Microsoft Windows ports; post-launch patches) – Marvel's Spider-Man series (Microsoft Windows ports) – Helldivers 2 (Xbox Series X/S port)
- Valkyrie Entertainment – Support studio for various franchises such as Infamous, God of War and Twisted Metal
- Malaysia Studio – Support for first-party titles, such as The Last of Us Part I and MLB The Show 22
Closed first-party studios
Asia:
- Japan Studio – Ape Escape series – LocoRoco series – Legend of Legaia series – The Eye of Judgment series – Everybody's Golf series – Patapon series – White Knight Chronicles series – The Legend of Dragoon – Talkman – Rogue Galaxy – Mainichi Issho – Piyotama – The Last Guy – Demon's Souls – Trash Panic – Numblast – Kung Fu Rider – Beat Sketcher – Bleach: Soul Resurrección – Puppeteer – Knack – Destiny of Spirits – Bloodborne – The Tomorrow Children – Siren series – Gravity Rush series - PaRappa the Rapper series – Arc the Lad series – Wild Arms series – Beyond the Beyond – Alundra series – Boku no Natsuyasumi series – SkyGunner – Okage:Shadow King – Tsugunai: Atonement – Dual Hearts – Dark Cloud series – Genji: Dawn of the Samurai series – Rule of Rose – Jeanne d'Arc – Tokyo Jungle – Soul Sacrifice – Rain – Freedom Wars – Oreshika: Tainted Bloodlines – Déraciné – Ghost in the Shell – Ghost in the Shell: Stand Alone Complex (both the 2004 game and the 2005 game) – Ico – Fantavision – Assistance: Jumping Flash! series – Hermie Hopperhead

North America:

- 989 Studios/Sony Interactive Studios America – NFL GameDay series – Major League Baseball series – NBA ShootOut series – NCAA GameBreaker series – Twisted Metal series (until 4) – Rally Cross series – ESPN Extreme Games series – Published: Cool Boarders series (3 & 4) – Jet Moto series – Syphon Filter series
- Incognito Entertainment – Twisted Metal series – Warhawk – War of the Monsters – Downhill Domination – Calling All Cars!
- Pixelopus – Entwined – Concrete Genie
- Zipper Interactive – Socom series – Mag – Unit 13
- Bluepoint Games – Uncharted: The Nathan Drake Collection – Shadow of the Colossus Remake – Demon's Souls Remake
- Firewalk Studios – Concord
- Dark Outlaw Games

Europe:

- Guerrilla Cambridge – MediEvil series – C-12: Final Resistance – Primal – Ghosthunter – 24: The Game – LittleBigPlanet PSP – TV Superstars – Killzone: Mercenary – EyeToy series – Heavenly Sword – PlayStation Home – PlayTV – Assistance: Killzone series – Wipeout series
- London Studio & Team Soho – SingStar series – DanceStar Party series – EyeToy series, EyePet series – Wonderbook series – The Getaway series – This is Football series – World Tour Soccer series – Passport To... series – PlayStation Home – NBA ShootOut '97 – Porsche Challenge – Rapid Racer – Spice World – Team Buddies – Hardware: Online Arena – Fired Up – Gangs of London – Aqua Vita – Operation Creature Feature – The Trials of Topoq – Mesmerize Distort – Tori-Emaki – Mesmerize Trace – Beats – RA. One: The Game – DON 2: The Game
- BigBig Studios – Pursuit Force series – MotorStorm: Arctic Edge – Little Deviants
- Evolution Studios – World Rally Championship series – MotorStorm series – Driveclub
- Psygnosis/Studio Liverpool – Wipeout series – Formula One series – Colony Wars series – Adidas Power Soccer series – Published: Destruction Derby series – 3D Lemmings – Rollcage series
- Fabrik Games – Filthy Lucre – The Lost Bear
- Neon Koi – mobile game developer
- Manchester Studio

=== Other platforms ===
Between 2020 and 2025, SIE had released some of its exclusive titles from first-party studios for Windows PCs, starting with Horizon: Zero Dawn in August 2020, and with Days Gone in May 2021. Layden said in a 2021 interview that he was part of the team that came up with this concept, where they recognized "we need to go out to where these new customers are, where these new fans could be. We need to go to where they are... Because they've decided not to come to my house, so I've got to go their house now. And what's the best way to go to their house? Why not take one of our top-selling games?" Ryan said in an interview that with some of the latter PlayStation 4 titles that "There's an opportunity to expose those great games to a wider audience" and that Horizon: Zero Dawn's release on Windows shows there was a strong interest in further releases. An investor report in 2021 stated that a primary factor in SIE's recent desire to expand into PC gaming under Ryan stems from the motivation to expand the PlayStation brand into China, Russia and India—markets where console-oriented gaming is far less prevalent than in the West and Japan. In June 2021 after acquiring the studio Nixxes which had become their go-to developer for these ports, Sony confirmed that they are dedicated to PC gaming and value PC gamers, although the PlayStation consoles will still be the "first" and "best" places to play their games. Subsequent Windows releases included God of War (2018), Marvel's Spider-Man Remastered, the Uncharted: Legacy of Thieves collection, Sackboy: A Big Adventure, and Marvel's Spider-Man: Miles Morales in 2022; Returnal, The Last of Us Part I, and Ratchet & Clank: Rift Apart throughout 2023, Ghost of Tsushima Director's Cut, Horizon Forbidden West - Complete Edition, Horizon Zero Dawn Remastered, Until Dawn, Lego Horizon Adventures, and God of War Ragnarök throughout 2024; and Marvel's Spider-Man 2 and The Last of Us Part II Remastered in 2025.

Video Games Chronicle observed that Sony had established a label, PlayStation PC around April 2021 to handle the publication of its games on Windows. The label was quietly renamed PlayStation Publishing in June 2024. SIE stated in a May 2022 investor report that sales of PC ports of their games had grown from $30 million in their 2020 fiscal year, to $80 million in 2021, and estimated to be $300 million for 2022. Because of this, SIE planned at the time to continue supporting PC releases of their PlayStation exclusive games and anticipated that by 2025, a third of their games revenue would've come from PC sales. In February 2026, it was reported that SIE was ceasing their publishing efforts for single-player PlayStation Studios titles on PC after several recent releases were alleged to have underperformed in sales, though they would continue to distribute multiplayer and second-party games from development partners. A subsequent report from Bloomberg News in March suggested that Sony had internally canceled previously planned ports of new titles such as Ghost of Yōtei as part of the transition away from Windows development, and that future games such as Saros and Marvel's Wolverine were intended to remain completely exclusive to PlayStation 5. The decision to retract PC support for tentpole single-player games was reportedly sourced from concerns within Sony that such releases risked damaging PlayStation consoles' longevity, including the hardware sales of PlayStation 5 and its successors. Bloomberg writer Jason Schreier also observed that the pivot away from PC support potentially aligned with Xbox's development of its next-generation console codenamed "Project Helix", which was confirmed to also support PC titles, thereby enabling PlayStation-published games on Steam to be playable on rival hardware. PlayStation Studios creative head Hermen Hulst reportedly confirmed that future single-player titles from first-party developers would remain exclusive to PlayStation consoles during an internal town hall meeting in May 2026.

SIE also began seeking the mobile games market, forming a division named ForwardWorks to develop mobile games for Japan in 2016. To expand this ambition to the West, they hired a former content manager for Apple Arcade in 2020, as a means to bring their IPs to this platform. SIE acquired Savage Game Studios as their first dedicated mobile developer within PlayStation Studios in August 2022 for an undisclosed sum. It expects that by 2025, mobile games will make up 20% of their games revenue. In March 2026, SIE was reported to have made significant cuts in its mobile games division and that outside currently announced and released titles, they were anticipated to de-emphasize their presence in this market in favor of focusing on fewer, high-impact projects.

Outside Windows and mobile, Sony Interactive Entertainment have also periodically published or licensed games for distribution on other game platforms. In 2021, their annual sports franchise MLB: The Show was renegotiated for release on non-PlayStation consoles for the first time in the series' history, beginning with MLB The Show 21, which launched simultaneously on Xbox One and Xbox Series X/S alongside the PlayStation versions. Due to SIE's competitive opposition towards Microsoft, the Xbox versions were published by MLB Advanced Media, who also allowed the series to be carried on Microsoft's subscription service Xbox Game Pass. The next installment, MLB The Show 22, would also mark the series' debut on Nintendo consoles with a release on Nintendo Switch alongside PlayStation and Xbox. In 2024, Sony released Lego Horizon Adventures through their PlayStation Publishing label already hosting their Windows titles. The game is a Lego video game spinoff of their first-party Horizon series, released on Nintendo Switch in tandem with PlayStation 5 and Windows, making it the first SIE-published game to appear on a Nintendo system, as well as the first Sony franchise to do so since Wipeout 64 (1998) for Nintendo 64. Sony Interactive Entertainment entered a licensing deal with publisher Bandai Namco Entertainment to distribute remasters and new entries in first-party PlayStation franchises for multiple platforms while they retain final ownership over the intellectual properties, with particular attention towards franchises formerly developed by Japan Studio. In 2025, Freedom Wars Remastered launched for Nintendo Switch and Windows in addition to PlayStation 4 and PlayStation 5. Bandai Namco also published Patapon 1+2 Replay and develop Everybody's Golf: Hot Shots for Nintendo Switch, PlayStation 5 and Windows under license from SIE. In August 2025, Sony released Helldivers 2 for Xbox Series X/S under PlayStation Publishing, making it the first game directly distributed by SIE on an Xbox console.

== See also ==
- List of Sony Interactive Entertainment video games
