= The Best (PlayStation) =

PlayStation budget range in Asia

Official The Best and PS one Books badges used on PlayStation game covers

The Best is a budget range of reissued PlayStation games released in Japan and parts of Asia. Similar budget ranges include Greatest Hits (PlayStation) in North America, Essentials in PAL regions and BigHit Series in Korea.

For the PlayStation, The Best was followed by PS one Books when the PS one was released in 2001. These games were top selling popular titles that were made available again in a low-priced version under this new label. Games released under the PS one Books label did not come in standard jewel cases like other PlayStation games, but instead came packaged in slim jewel cases. The games' instruction booklets were typically placed outside of the case, with both booklet and case sealed in plastic packaging. The software contained on the discs was usually the original retail game, however bug fixes were applied for a few titles. PS one Books titles were still being released until late 2006.

The first PlayStation 3 The Best titles were released on March 19, 2008. However Armored Core 4 had been prior released as early as January 10, 2008 in the Best Collection.

== PlayStation ==
=== The Best ===
- A. IV Evolution Global
- A5: A-Ressha de Ikō 5
- Ace Combat
- Ace Combat 2
- Ace Combat 3: Electrosphere
- Akagawa Jirō: Yasōkyoku
- Akumajō Dracula X: Gekka no Yasōkyoku
- Arc the Lad
- Arc the Lad II
- Arc the Lad III
- Armored Core
- Armored Core: Project Phantasma
- Armored Core: Master of Arena
- Bakusō Dekotora Densetsu: Art Truck Battle
- Bakusō Dekotora Densetsu 2
- Battle Arena Toshinden 2 Plus
- Bass Landing 2
- BioHazard 3: Last Escape
- BioHazard: Gun Survivor
- Bloody Roar: Hyper Beast Duel
- Bloody Roar 2: Bringer of the New Age
- Boku no Natsuyasumi
- Bokujō Monogatari Harvest Moon
- Boxer's Road
- Breath of Fire III
- Breath of Fire IV
- Burger Burger
- Bushido Blade
- Bushido Blade 2
- Chrono Trigger
- Chrono Cross
- Classic Road
- Clock Tower 2
- Cool Boarders
- Cool Boarders 2
- D no Shokutaku
- Dai-4-Ji Super Robot Taisen S
- Daisenryaku: Player's Spirit
- Densetsu no Ogre Battle
- Densha de Go!
- Densha de Go! 2
- Densha de Go! Professional
- Devil Summoner: Soul Hackers
- Diablo
- Dino Crisis
- Dino Crisis 2
- Dokapon! Ikari no Tetsuken
- Doko Demo Issho
- Dragon Quest IV: Michibikareshi Monotachi
- Dragon Quest VII: Eden no Senshi-tachi
- Echo Night
- Elie no Atelier: Salberg no Renkinjutsushi 2
- FIFA: Road to World Cup 98 – World Cup e no Michi
- Fighting Illusion: K-1 Revenge
- Fighting Illusion: K-1 Grand Prix '98
- Final Fantasy VII International
- Final Fantasy VIII
- Final Fantasy IX
- Final Fantasy Tactics
- Fish Eyes
- Gakkō o Tsukurō!!
- Gallop Racer 2: One and Only Road to Victory
- Gallop Racer 2000
- Gensō Suikoden
- Gokujō Parodius Da! Deluxe Pack
- Gradius Gaiden
- Gran Turismo
- Grandia
- Gun Bullet
- Gunbarl
- Hajime no Ippo: The Fighting!
- Honkaku Pro Mahjong Tetsuman Special
- Hōshin Engi
- Hyper Olympic in Nagano
- I.Q.: Intelligent Qube
- I.Q.: Final
- Initial D
- Jet de Go!: Let's Go By Airliner
- Kagero: Kokumeikan Shinsho
- Kamen Rider
- Kensetsu Kikai Simulator: Kenki Ippai!!
- Kidō Senshi Gundam
- Kidō Senshi Gundam Version 2.0
- Kindaichi Shōnen no Jikenbo Hihōtō Arata Naru Sangeki
- King's Field II
- King's Field III
- Klayman Klayman: Neverhood no Nazo
- Kokumeikan: Trap Simulation Game
- Legaia Densetsu
- Linda³ Again
- Lunar: Silver Star Story Complete
- Lupin III: Chateau de Cagliostro Saikai
- Macross Digital Mission VF-X
- Mahjong Taikai II Special
- Maria: Kimitachi ga Umareta Wake
- Atelier Marie: The Alchemist of Salburg
- Revelations: Persona
- Menkyo o Torō
- Minna no Golf
- Minna no Golf 2
- Monster Farm
- Monster Farm 2
- Moon: Remix RPG Adventure
- Moonlight Syndrome
- My Home Dream
- Myst
- Namco Museum Encore
- Namco Museum Volume 1
- Namco Museum Volume 2
- Namco Museum Volume 3
- Namco Museum Volume 4
- Namco Museum Volume 5
- Neo Atlas
- Nobunaga no Yabou: Haōden
- Nobunaga no Yabō: Tenshōki
- Nobunaga no Yabō: Shōseiroku
- Nobunaga no Yabō: Reppūden
- NOëL: NOT DiGITAL
- Option Tuning Car Battle
- Ore no Ryōri
- Ore no Shikabane wo Koete Yuke
- OverBlood
- OverBlood 2
- Pachi-Slot Kanzen Kōryaku 3
- PAL: Shinken Densetsu
- PaRappa the Rapper
- Parlor! Pro
- Parlor! Pro 2
- Parlor! Pro 4
- Persona 2: Innocent Sin
- Persona 2: Eternal Punishment
- Pilot ni Narō!
- Policenauts
- PoPoLoCrois Monogatari
- PoPoLoCrois Monogatari II
- Pro Mahjong Kiwame Plus
- Puyo Puyo 2 Ketteiban
- Puyo Puyo SUN Ketteiban
- R?MJ: The Mystery Hospital
- RayStorm
- Real Bout Garō Densetsu
- Rebus
- Ridge Racer
- Ridge Racer Revolution
- Rittai Ninja Katsugeki Tenchu: Shinobi Gaisen
- RPG Tsukūru 4
- Runabout
- Rurouni Kenshin: Meiji Kenkaku Romantan: Ishin Gekitōhen
- Rurouni Kenshin: Meiji Kenkaku Romantan: Jūyūshi Inbō Hen
- Samurai Spirits: Zankuro Musōken
- Sangokushi IV
- Sangokushi V
- Sangokushi VI
- SD Gundam: G Century
- SD Gundam: G Generation
- Sentō Kokka: Air Land Battle
- Sentō Kokka Kai Improved
- Shin Nippon Pro Wrestling: Toukon Retsuden
- Shin Super Robot Taisen
- Shin Theme Park
- Shinsetsu Samurai Spirits Bushidō Retsuden
- Shutokō Battle: Drift King
- Shutokō Battle R
- Sidewinder USA
- Sidewinder 2
- SimCity 2000
- Simulation RPG Tsukūru
- Sōmatō
- Soul Edge
- Sound Novel Evolution 1: Otogirisō Sosei-Hen
- Sound Novel Evolution 2: Kamaitachi no Yoru Tokubetsu Hen
- Street Fighter EX Plus α
- Street Fighter Zero 2'
- Super Robot Taisen F
- Super Robot Taisen F Kanketsuhen
- Taikō Risshiden II
- Taiyō no Shippo: Wild, Pure, Simple Life
- Tales of Destiny
- Tales of Eternia
- Tales of Phantasia
- Tamamayu Monogatari
- Tekken
- Tekken 2
- Tekken 3
- The Conveni: Ano Machi wo Dokusen Seyo
- The King of Fighters '95
- The King of Fighters '96
- The King of Fighters '97
- The Raiden Project
- Theme Park
- Time Crisis
- Tokimeki Memorial: Forever With You
- Tomb Raider
- Tomb Raider II
- Touge Max: Saisoku Driver Master
- Touge Max 2
- True Love Story
- Tsuwadō Seabass Fishing
- Ultraman Fighting Evolution
- Um Jammer Lammy
- Valkyrie Profile
- Vandal Hearts
- Vandal Hearts II
- Vib-Ribbon
- Vigilante 8
- V-Rally Championship Edition
- Wild ARMs
- Wild ARMs: 2nd Ignition
- Winning Post 2: Program '96
- Winning Post 3
- Wizardry: Llylgamyn Saga
- World Neverland: Olerud Ōkoku Monogatari
- World Neverland 2: Pluto Kyōwakoku Monogatari
- XI sai
- XI [sai] Jumbo
- Yarudora Series Vol. 1: Double Cast
- Yarudora Series Vol. 2: Kisetsu o Dakishimete
- Yarudora Series Vol. 3: Sampaguita
- Yarudora Series Vol. 4: Yukiwari no Hana
- Yu-Gi-Oh! Monster Capsule Breed & Battle
- Zero Pilot: Fighter of Silver Wing

=== The Best for Family ===
- Bakusō Kyōdai Let's & Go!!: WGP Hyper Heat
- Bomberman Fantasy Race
- Bomberman World
- Choro Q Ver 1.02
- Choro Q 2
- Choro Q 3
- Choro Q Marine: Q-Boat
- Choro Q Wonderful!
- Crash Bandicoot
- Crash Bandicoot 2: Cortex Strikes Back
- Crash Bandicoot 3: Flying! Globe-Trotting
- Crash Bandicoot Racing
- Detana TwinBee Yahoo! Deluxe Pack
- Digimon World
- Dragon Ball Z: Idainaru Dragon Ball Densetsu
- Dragon Ball Z: Ultimate Battle 22
- Dragon Ball Final Bout
- DX Jinsei Game
- DX Jinsei Game II
- DX Nippon Tokkyu Ryokō Game
- DX Okuman Chōja Game
- Ganbare Goemon: Uchū Kaizoku Akogingu
- Gucho de Park: Theme Park Monogatari
- Hermie Hopperhead: Scrap Panic
- Iwatobi Penguin Rocky X Hopper
- Kawa no Nushi Tsuri: Hikyou o Motomete
- Kaze no Klonoa: Door to Phantomile
- Meitantei Conan
- Momotarō Densetsu
- Momotarō Dentetsu 7
- Motor Toon Grand Prix USA Edition
- Nyan to Wonderful
- Pocket Fighter
- Puzzle Bobble 2
- Puzzle Bobble 3 DX
- Rockman 8: Metal Heroes
- Rockman Battle & Chase
- Rockman DASH Hagane no Bōkenshin
- Rockman DASH 2 – Episode 2: Great Inheritance
- Rockman X3
- Rockman X4
- Rockman X5
- Rockman X6
- Saru! Get You!
- Smash Court
- Susume! Taisen Puzzle-Dama
- Tetris X
- Time Bokan Series: Bokan to Ippatsu! Doronbo
- Tron ni Kobun

=== PS one Books ===
- 20 Reiki Striker Retsuden
- Akagawa Jirō: Majotachi no Nemuri: Fukkatsusai
- Akagawa Jirō: Yasōkyoku
- Akagawa Jirō: Yasōkyoku 2
- Akumajō Dracula X: Gekka no Yasōkyoku
- America Ōdan Ultra Quiz
- Arc the Lad
- Arc the Lad II
- Arc the Lad III
- Armored Core
- Armored Core: Project Phantasma
- Armored Core: Master of Arena
- Beltlogger 9
- Bishi Bashi Special
- Bishi Bashi Special 2
- Bishi Bashi Special 3: Step Champ
- Bokujō Monogatari Harvest Moon for Girl
- Bomberman Fantasy Race
- Bomberman Land
- Charamela
- Chocobo Racing
- Choro Q 3
- Choro Q Jet: Rainbow Wings
- Choro Q Wonderful!
- Choro Q Marine: Q-Boat
- Chrono Trigger
- Chrono Cross
- Colin McRae the Rally
- Colin McRae the Rally 2
- Combat Choro Q
- Crash Bandicoot
- Crash Bandicoot 2: Cortex Strikes Back
- Crash Bandicoot 3: Flying! Globe-Trotting
- Crash Bandicoot Carnival
- Crash Bandicoot Racing
- Croket! Kindan no Kinka Box
- Denkō Sekka Micro Runner
- Detana TwinBee Yahoo! Deluxe Pack
- Devil Summoner: Soul Hackers
- Dewprism
- Digital Glider Airman
- Dōkyu Re-Mix: Billiards Multiple
- Dragon Quest IV: Michibikareshi Monotachi
- Dragon Quest VII: Eden no Senshi-tachi
- DX Jinsei Game V
- DX Okuman Chōja Game II
- DX Shachō Game
- Echo Night
- Echo Night #2: Nemuri no Shihaisha
- Ehrgeiz
- Enen Angel
- Exciting Pro Wrestling 2
- Fever: Sankyo Kōshiki Pachinko Simulation
- Fever 2: Sankyo Kōshiki Pachinko Simulation
- Fever 3: Sankyo Kōshiki Pachinko Simulation
- Fever 4: Sankyo Kōshiki Pachinko Simulation
- Fever 5: Sankyo Kōshiki Pachinko Simulation
- Final Fantasy Tactics
- Final Fantasy VII International
- Fish Eyes
- Fish Eyes II
- Front Mission 3
- Gakkō o Tsukurō!!
- Gakkō o Tsukurō!! 2
- Gallop Racer 3
- Ganbare Goemon: Ōedo Daikaiten
- Ganbare Goemon: Uchū Kaizoku Akogingu
- GeGeGe no Kitarō: Gyakushū! Yōkai Daichisen
- Gekitotsu Toma L'Arc: TomaRunner vs L'Arc-en-Ciel
- Shovel Master Ninarou! KENKI Ippatsu!
- Gensō Suikoden
- Gensō Suikoden II
- Gensō Suikogaiden Vol.1: Harmonia no Kenshi
- Gensō Suikogaiden Vol.2 Kurisutaru Barē no Kettō
- GetBackers Dakkanoku
- Goemon: Shin Sedai Shūmei!
- Gokujō Parodius Da! Deluxe Pack
- Gradius Gaiden
- Gran Turismo
- Gran Turismo 2
- Great Rugby Jikkyō '98
- Groove Adventure Rave: Mikan no Hiseki
- Groove Adventure Rave: Yūkyū no Kizuna
- Gucho de Park: Theme Park Monogatari
- Hai-Shin 2
- Hunter × Hunter: Maboroshi no Greed Island
- Hunter × Hunter: Ubawareta Aura Stone
- I.Q.: Final
- Kagero: Kokumeikan Shinsho
- Kawa no Nushi Tsuri: Hikyō o Motomete
- Kensetsu Kikai Simulator: Kenki Ippai!!
- Kero Kero King
- King's Field
- King's Field II
- King's Field III
- Tecmo's Deception: Invitation to Darkness
- Lake Masters Pro
- Little Princess: Marl Ōkoku no Ningyō Hime 2
- Revelations: Persona
- Metal Gear Solid
- Metal Gear Solid: Integral
- Metal Slug
- Mezase! Meimon Yakyubu
- MiniMoni: Dice de Pyon!
- Momotarō Densetsu
- Momotarō Dentetsu V
- Momotarō Dentetsu 7
- Mushi Tarō
- My Home Dream
- Neko na Ka-n-ke-I
- Ōma ga Toki
- Ōma ga Toki 2
- Ore no Ryōri
- Ore no Shikabane o Koete Yuke
- Pachi-Slot Aruze Ōkoku 2
- Pachi-Slot Aruze Ōkoku 4
- PaRappa the Rapper
- Parasite Eve 2
- Policenauts
- PoPoLoCrois Monogatari
- PoPoLoCrois Monogatari II
- PoPoLoGue
- Quiz $ Millionaire
- Quiz $ Millionaire: Waku Waku Party
- Quiz Darakeno Jinsei Game Dai-2-kai!
- R4: Ridge Racer Type 4
- Racing Lagoon
- Reikoku: Ikeda Kizoku Shinrei Kenkyūjo
- Rockman
- Rockman 2: Dr. Wily no Nazo
- Rockman 3: Dr. Wily no Saigo!?
- Rockman 4: Aratanaru Yabō!!
- Rockman 5: Blues no Wana!?
- Rockman 6: Shijōsai Dai no Tatakai!!
- Rockman X4
- SaGa Frontier
- SaGa Frontier 2
- Samurai Spirits: Zankuro Musōken
- Samurai Spirits: Amakusa Kōrin Special
- Saru! Get You!
- Seiji o Asobō: Potestas
- Seiken Densetsu: Legend of Mana
- Senryaku Shidan: Tora! Tora! Tora! Rikusenhen
- Shin Theme Park
- Shutokō Battle R
- Silent Hill
- Sister Princess
- Sister Princess 2
- Slap Happy Rhythm Busters
- Smash Court
- Soul Edge
- Sound Novel Evolution 3: Machi – Unmei no Kōsaten
- Star Ocean: The Second Story
- Submarine Hunter Sya-Chi
- Summon Night
- Summon Night 2
- Super Robot Taisen Alpha
- Super Robot Taisen Alpha Gaiden
- Taiyō no Shippo: Wild, Pure, Simple Life
- Tamamayu Monogatari
- Tenkū no Restaurant
- Tennis no Ōjisama
- The Adventure of Puppet Princess: Marl Ōkoku no Ningyō Himee
- The Bombing Islands: Kid Klown no Krazy Puzzle
- The King of Fighters '97
- The King of Fighters '98
- Theme Aquarium
- Tokimeki Memorial: Forever With You
- Tokimeki Memorial 2 Substories: Dancing Summer Vacation
- Tokimeki Memorial 2 Substories: Leaping School Festival
- Tokimeki Memorial 2 Substories: Memories Ringing On
- Tokimeki Memorial Drama Series Vol.1: Nijiiro no Seishun
- Tokimeki Memorial Drama Series Vol.2: Irodori no Love Song
- Tokimeki Memorial Drama Series Vol.3: Tabidachi no Uta
- Tokimeki Memorial Taisen Puzzle-Dama
- Tokimeki Memorial 2 Taisen Puzzle-Dama
- Tokimeki no Houkago
- Tomb Raider
- Tomb Raider II
- Tora! Tora! Tora!
- Twilight Syndrome Saikai
- Twinbee RPG
- Umi no Nushi Tsuri: Takarajima ni Mukatte
- UmJammer Lammy
- Urawaza Mahjong: Korette Tenwatte Yatsukai
- Vagrant Story
- Valkyrie Profile
- Vampire Hunter D
- Vandal Hearts
- Vandal Hearts II
- Vib-Ribbon
- V-Rally Championship Edition
- V-Rally Championship Edition 2
- Wild ARMs
- Wild ARMs: 2nd Ignition
- WTC: World Touring Car Championship
- Xenogears
- XI sai
- Yu-Gi-Oh! Monster Capsule Breed & Battle
- Yu-Gi-Oh! Shin Dual Monsters
- Zen-Nippon Pro Wrestling: Ōja no Kon

== PlayStation 2 ==
- .hack//G.U. Vol. 1
- .hack//G.U. Vol. 2: Kimi Omō Koe
- .hack//G.U. Vol. 3: Aruku Yōna Hayasa de
- .hack//Vol. 1 x Vol. 2
- .hack//Vol. 3 x Vol. 4
- A.C.E.: Another Century's Episode
- Ace Combat 04: Shattered Skies
- Ace Combat 5: The Unsung War
- Ace Combat: The Belkan War
- Ar tonelico: Sekai no Owari de Utai Tsudzukeru Shōjo
- Ar tonelico II: Sekai ni Hibiku Shōjo-tachi no Metafalica
- Armored Core 2
- Armored Core 2: Another Age
- Armored Core 3
- Armored Core 3: Silent Line
- Armored Core: Last Raven
- Armored Core: Nexus
- Bakusō Dekotora Densetsu: Otoko Hanamichi Yume Roman
- BioHazard 4
- BioHazard Outbreak
- Bleach: Blade Battlers
- Bleach: Erabareshi Tamashii
- Bleach: Hanatareshi Yaboō
- Bloody Roar 3
- Boku no Natsuyasumi 2
- Boku to Maō
- Bokujō Monogatari 3: Heart ni Hi o Tsukete
- Bokujō Monogatari: Oh! Wonderful Life
- Bomberman Land 2
- Bravo Music
- Breath of Fire V: Dragon Quarter
- Busin: Wizardry Alternative
- Capcom Vs. SNK 2: Millionaire Fighting 2001
- Crash Bandicoot 4: Sakuretsu! Majin Power
- Culdcept II Expansion
- Dai-2-Ji Super Robot Taisen Alpha
- Dai-3-Ji Super Robot Taisen Alpha: Shūen no Ginga e
- Dark Cloud
- Dark Chronicle
- Dead or Alive 2: Hard*Core
- Demento
- Dennō Senki Virtual-On: Marz
- Densha de Go! Final
- Densha de Go! Shinkansen
- Devil May Cry
- Devil May Cry 3: Special Edition
- Dirge of Cerberus: Final Fantasy VII International
- Dragon Ball Z
- Dragon Ball Z 2
- Dragon Ball Z 3
- Energy Airforce
- Exciting Pro Wrestling 3
- EX Jinsei Game II
- Extermination
- Fate/stay night Réalta Nua
- Final Fantasy X
- Fu-un Bakumatsu-den
- Fu-un Shinsengumi
- Galacta Meisaku Gekijoō: Rakugaki Ōkoku
- Gallop Racer 6: Revolution
- Gambler Densetsu Tetsuya
- Genji
- Gensō Suikoden IV
- Gensō Suikoden V
- God Hand
- Gran Turismo 3: A-Spec
- Gran Turismo 4
- Gran Turismo 4 Prologue
- Gran Turismo Concept: 2001 Tokyo
- Guilty Gear X Plus
- Guilty Gear XX: The Midnight Carnival
- Gundam True Odyssey: Ushinawareta G no Densetsu
- GunGriffon Blaze
- Gun Survivor 2 – BioHazard – Code: Veronica
- Hajime no Ippo: Victorious Boxers- Championship Version
- ICO
- Ikusa Gami
- Initial D: Special Stage
- Jak & Daxter: The Precursor Legacy
- Ka
- Kagero 2: Dark Illusion
- Kamaitachi no Yoru 2
- Katamari Damacy
- Kaze no Klonoa 2: Sekai ga Nozonda Wasuremono
- Kengo
- Kengo 2
- Kengo 3
- Kenka Banchō
- Kenka Banchō 2: Full Throttle
- Kessen
- Kessen II
- Kessen III
- Kidō Senshi Gundam Seed Destiny: Rengō vs. Z.A.F.T. II Plus
- Kidō Senshi Gundam: Giren no Yabō – Axis no Kyōi V
- Kidō Senshi Gundam: Renpō vs. Zeon DX
- Kidō Senshi Z Gundam: AEUG Vs. Titans
- Kinnikuman: Generations
- Kotoba no Puzzle: Mojipittan
- Legaia: Duel Saga
- Lupin III: Majutsu-Ō no Isan
- Magna Carta: Tears of Blood
- Makai Senki Disgaea
- Makai Senki Disgaea 2
- Maximo
- Metal Gear Solid 2: Sons of Liberty
- Metal Gear Solid 2: Substance
- Metal Gear Solid 3: Snake Eater
- Metal Saga: Sajin no Kusari
- Minna Daisuki Katamari Damacy
- Minna no Golf 3
- Minna no Golf 4
- Minna no Tennis
- Momotarō Dentetsu 12: Nishinihon Hen mo ari Masse!
- Momotarō Dentetsu 15: Godai Bombi Toujou! No Maki
- Momotarō Dentetsu 16: Moving in Hokkaido!
- Momotarō Dentetsu USA
- Monster Farm 4
- Monster Hunter G
- Monster Hunter 2
- Musou Orochi
- Musou Orochi: Maō Sairin
- Namco × Capcom
- Naruto: Narutimate Hero
- Naruto: Narutimate Hero 2
- Naruto: Narutimate Hero 3
- New Jinsei Game
- Nobunaga no Yabō: Kakushin
- Nobunaga no Yabō: Tenka Sōsei
- Odin Sphere
- Ōkami
- Onimusha
- Onimusha 2
- Operator's Side
- PaRappa the Rapper 2
- Persona 3 FES
- Persona 4
- Phantasy Star Universe
- Phantom Brave
- Pilot ni Narō! 2
- Pipo Saru 2001
- PoPoLoCrois: Hajimari no Bouken
- Puyo Puyo Fever
- Ratchet & Clank
- Ratchet & Clank 2: GaGaGa! Ginga no Komandossu
- Ratchet & Clank 3: Totsugeki! Galactic Rangers
- Ratchet & Clank 4th: GiriGiri Ginga no Giga Battle
- Rez
- Ridge Racer V
- Rogue Galaxy Director's Cut
- R-Type Final
- Rurouni Kenshin: Meiji Kenkaku Romantan: Enjō! Kyōto Rinne
- Ryū ga Gotoku
- Ryū ga Gotoku 2
- Samurai Dou: Kanzenban
- Samurai Dou 2: Kettōban
- Sangokushi VII
- Saru! Get You! 2
- Saru! Get You! 3
- Saru! Get You: Million Monkeys
- Sengoku BASARA
- Sengoku BASARA 2
- Sengoku BASARA 2 Heroes
- Sengoku BASARA X
- Sengoku Musou
- Sengoku Musou Moushouden
- Sengoku Musou 2
- Sengoku Musou 2 Empires
- Seven: Molmorth no Kiheitai
- Shadow Hearts
- Shadow Hearts II: Director's Cut
- Shin Megami Tensei III: Nocturne
- Shin Onimusha: Dawn of Dreams
- Shin Sangoku Musou 2
- Shin Sangoku Musou 3
- Shin Sangoku Musou 3 Moushouden
- Shin Sangoku Musou 4
- Shin Sangoku Musou 4 Empires
- Shin Sangoku Musou 4 Moushouden
- Shining Force EXA
- Shining Tears
- Shining Wind
- Shinobi
- Shutokō Battle 0
- Shutokō Battle 01
- Sidewinder Max
- Siren
- Siren 2
- Space Channel 5 Part 2
- Star Ocean: Till the End of Time – Director's Cut
- Summon Night 3
- Super Robot Taisen Impact
- Super Robot Taisen OG: Original Generations
- Super Robot Wars Z
- Suzumiya Haruhi no Tomadoi
- Taiko no Tatsujin: Appare Sandaime
- Taiko no Tatsujin: Go! Go! Godaime
- Taiko no Tatsujin: Waku Waku Anime Matsuri
- Tales of Destiny 2
- Tales of Legendia
- Tales of Symphonia
- Tales of the Abyss
- Tear Ring Saga: Berwick Saga
- Tekken 4
- Tekken 5
- Tekken Tag Tournament
- Tenchu Kurenai
- Tenchu San
- Tengai Makyō II: Manjimaru
- Tengai Makyō III: Namida
- Time Crisis II
- Toro to Kyūjitsu
- Tourist Trophy
- True Crime: New York City
- Ultraman
- Ultraman Fighting Evolution 2
- Valkyrie Profile 2: Silmeria
- Vampire Night
- Venus & Braves: Majo to Megami to Horobi no Yogen
- Wander to Kyozō
- Wild ARMs: Advanced 3rd
- Wild ARMs: Alter Code F
- Wild ARMs: The 4th Detonator
- Wild ARMs: The 5th Vanguard
- WRC: World Rally Championship
- Xenosaga Episode I: Der Wille zur Macht
- Xenosaga Episode II: Jenseits von Gut und Böse
- Yū Yū Hakusho Forever
- Z.O.E.: Zone of the Enders
- Zero
- Zero II: Akai Chō
- Zero III: Shisei no Koe
- Zettai Zetsumei Toshi

== PlayStation 3 ==
- Ace Combat: Assault Horizon
- Afrika
- Akiba's Trip: Undead & Undressed (Asia only)
- Alice: Madness Returns (Asia only)
- Ar tonelico Qoga: Knell of Ar Ciel
- Armored Core 4
- Armored Core: For Answer
- Army of Two (Asia only)
- Assassin's Creed (Asia only)
- Assassin's Creed II (Asia only)
- Assassin's Creed III (Asia only)
- Assassin's Creed: Revelations (Asia only)
- Battlefield 3
- Battlefield: Bad Company (Asia only)
- Battlefield: Bad Company 2 (Asia only)
- Bayonetta
- Resident Evil 5 (Asia only)
- BioHazard 5: Alternative Edition
- Resident Evil 6
- BioHazard Chronicles HD Selection
- BioHazard HD Remaster
- Resident Evil: Revelations
- Resident Evil: Revelations 2
- Resident Evil
- Bladestorm: Hyakunen Sensō
- BlazBlue: Calamity Trigger (Asia only)
- BlazBlue: Chrono Phantasma
- BlazBlue: Continuum Shift Extend
- Bleach: Soul Ignition
- Boku no Natsuyasumi 3
- Burnout Paradise: The Ultimate Box (Asia only)
- Crysis 2 (Asia only)
- Dai-3-Ji Super Robot Taisen Z Jigoku-hen
- Darksiders: Shinpan no Toki (Asia only)
- Dead Rising 2
- Dead Space (Asia only)
- Dead Space 2 (Asia only)
- Demon's Souls
- Devil May Cry 4
- Devil May Cry HD Collection
- Disgaea Dimension 2
- Dragon Age: Origins
- Dragon Ball Z: Ultimate Tenkaichi
- Dragon's Dogma
- Dragon Quest Builders
- Dragon Quest Heroes: The World Tree's Woe and the Blight Below (Asia only)
- Driver: San Francisco (Asia only)
- Earth Defense Force: Insect Armageddon
- The Legend of Heroes: Trails of Cold Steel
- Enchant Arm
- Atelier Escha & Logy: Alchemists of the Dusk Sky
- Fallout 3
- Fallout 3: Game of the Year Edition
- Fallout: New Vegas
- Far Cry 3 (Asia Only)
- FIFA 11 (Asia only)
- FIFA 12 (Asia only)
- Fight Night Round 4 (Asia only)
- Final Fantasy XIII
- Final Fantasy XIII-2
- FolksSoul: Ushinawareta Denshō
- God of War III
- Heavy Rain
- InFamous
- InFamous 2
- Initial D Extreme Stage
- Just Dance 4 (Asia only)
- Katamari Forever
- Kidō Senshi Gundam: Extreme VS
- Kidō Senshi Gundam: Extreme VS Full Boost
- Kidō Senshi Gundam: Target in Sight
- Kidō Senshi Gundam Senki Record U.C. 0081
- Killzone 2
- Killzone 3
- LittleBigPlanet
- LittleBigPlanet 2
- Lost Planet: Extreme Condition
- Lost Planet 2
- Macross 30: Ginga o Tsunagu Utagoe
- MAG: Massive Action Game
- Disgaea 3: Absence of Justice
- Atelier Meruru: The Apprentice of Arland
- Metal Gear Solid 4: Guns of the Patriots
- Metal Gear Solid HD Collection
- Metal Gear Solid: Peace Walker HD Edition
- Minna no Golf 5
- Minna no Golf 6
- Monster Hunter Portable 3rd HD Ver.
- Warriors Orochi 3e
- Naruto: Ultimate Ninja Storm
- Naruto Shippuden: Ultimate Ninja Storm 2
- Need for Speed: Carbon (Asia only)
- Need for Speed: ProStreet (Asia only)
- Need for Speed: Shift (Asia only)
- Need for Speed: Undercover (Asia only)
- NieR Replicant
- Ninja Gaiden Sigma
- Ninja Gaiden Sigma 2
- Ninja Gaiden 3: Razor's Edge (Asia only)
- Nobunaga no Yabō: Tendō
- Nobunaga no Yabō: Tendō with Power-Up Kit
- Nobunaga no Yabō: Sōzō
- No More Heroes: Red Zone Edition
- Ōkami HD
- Prince of Persia (Asia only)
- Ratchet & Clank Future
- Resistance: Fall of Man
- Resistance 2
- Ridge Racer 7
- Rocksmith 2014 (Asia only)
- Rise from Lair
- Rune Factory Oceans
- Ryū ga Gotoku 1&2 HD Edition (Asia only)
- Ryū ga Gotoku 3
- Ryū ga Gotoku 4
- Ryū ga Gotoku 5
- Ryū ga Gotoku Kenzan!
- Ryū ga Gotoku: Of the End (Asia only)
- Rorona no Atelier: Arland no Renkinjutsushi
- Sacred 2: Fallen Angel
- Saint Seiya Senki
- Samurai Dou 3 Plus
- Samurai Dou 4 Plus
- Sangokushi XII
- Sengoku BASARA 3
- Sengoku BASARA 3 Utage
- Sengoku BASARA 4 Sumeragi
- Sengoku Musou 3 Z
- Sengoku Musou 3 Empires
- Sengoku Musou 4
- Senjō no Varukyuria
- Shallie no Atelier: Tasogare no Umi no Renkinjutsushi
- Shin Kamaitachi no Yoru: 11 Hitome no Suspect
- Shin Sangoku Musou 6
- Shin Sangoku Musou 6 Moushouden (Asia only)
- Shin Sangoku Musou 7 (Asia only)
- Shining Resonance
- Shirokishi Monogatari: Hikari to Yami no Kakusei
- SIREN: New Translation
- Soulcalibur IV
- Star Ocean: The Last Hope International
- Street Fighter IV (Asia only)
- Super Street Fighter IV (Asia only)
- Super Street Fighter IV: Arcade Edition
- Tales of Graces f
- Tales of Vesperia
- Tales of Xillia
- Tales of Xillia 2
- Tears to Tiara: Kakan no Daichi (Asia only)
- Tekken 6
- Tekken Tag Tournament 2
- The Elder Scrolls IV: Oblivion
- The Elder Scrolls IV: Oblivion – Game of the Year Edition
- The Elder Scrolls V: Skyrim
- The Elder Scrolls V: Skyrim – Legendary Edition
- The Idolm@ster 2
- The Idolm@ster: One for All
- The Last of Us
- The Orange Box (Asia only)
- Tom Clancy's Ghost Recon Advanced Warfighter 2 (Asia only)
- Tom Clancy's Rainbow Six: Vegas
- Tom Clancy's Splinter Cell: Double Agent (Asia only)
- Tokyo Jungle
- Toro to Morimori (Asia only)
- Totori no Atelier: Arland no Renkinjutsushi 2
- Trusty Bell: Chopin no Yume Reprise
- Uncharted: El Dorado no Hihō
- Uncharted 2: Ougontō to Kieta Sendan
- Uncharted 3: Sabaku ni Nemuru Atlantis
- Ultra Street Fighter IV
- Virtua Fighter 5
- Wangan Midnight
- Warhawk (Asia only)
- Watch Dogs (Asia only)
- World Soccer Winning Eleven 2009 (Asia only)
- World Soccer Winning Eleven 2010 (Asia only)
- World Soccer Winning Eleven 2011 (Asia only)
- World Soccer Winning Eleven 2012 (Asia only)
- World Soccer Winning Eleven 2013 (Asia only)
- WWE SmackDown vs. Raw 2010 (Asia only)
- Zone of the Enders HD Edition

== PlayStation 4 ==
- Assassin's Creed IV: Black Flag
- Assassin's Creed Unity
- Assassin's Creed Syndicate
- Astro Bot Rescue Mission
- Battlefield 4
- Battlefield Hardline
- BioHazard 7: Resident Evil – Gold Edition (Asia Only)
- BioHazard: Origins Collection
- BioHazard: Revelations 2
- Bloodborne
- Bravo Team
- Chikyū Bōeigun 4.1: The Shadow of New Despair
- Days Gone
- Death Stranding
- Déraciné
- Destiny: The Collection (Asia Only)
- Detroit: Become Human
- Devil May Cry 4: Special Edition
- Dragon Age: Inquisition
- Dragon Quest Heroes: Yamiryū to Sekaiju no Shiro (Asia Only)
- Dragon Quest Builders
- Driveclub
- F1 2015 (Asia Only)
- Far Cry 4 (Asia Only)
- Far Cry Primal (Asia Only)
- Farpoint
- Fate/Extella
- Firewall: Zero Hour
- Final Fantasy X/X-2 HD Remaster
- Final Fantasy Type-0 HD (Asia Only)
- God of War
- God of War III Remastered (Asia Only)
- Gran Turismo Sport Spec II
- Gravity Daze/Jūryoku-teki Memai: Jōsō e no Kikan ni Oite, Kanojo no Nai-Uchū ni Shōjita Setsudō
- Gravity Daze 2/Jūryoku-teki Memai kanketsu-hen: Jōsō e no Kikan no Hate, Kanojo no Uchi Uchū ni Shūren Shita Sentaku
- Hitokui no Ōwashi Trico
- Horizon Zero Dawn: Complete Edition
- Infamous First Light (Asia Only)
- Infamous Second Son
- Just Dance 2014 (Asia Only)
- Just Dance 2015 (Asia Only)
- Just Dance 2016 (Asia Only)
- Just Dance 2017 (Asia Only)
- Killzone: Shadow Fall
- Knack (Asia Only)
- Knack II (Asia Only)
- LittleBigPlanet 3
- Makai Senki Disgaea 5
- Monster Hunter: World
- Need for Speed: Rivals
- New Danganronpa V3: Minna no Koroshiai Shingakki
- New Minna no Golf
- Persona 5
- Psycho Break (Asia Only)
- Ratchet & Clank: The Game
- Rayman Legends (Asia Only)
- RIGS Machine Combat League
- Ryū ga Gotoku 0
- Ryū ga Gotoku Ishin!
- Ryū ga Gotoku Kiwami
- Sengoku BASARA 4 Sumeragi
- Sleeping Dogs Definitive Edition (Asia Only)
- Senjō no Varukyuria Remaster (Asia Only)
- Spider-Man
- Tearaway Unfolded (Asia Only)
- The Crew (Asia Only)
- The Inpatient: Yami no Byōtō
- The Last of Us Part II
- The Last of Us Remastered
- The Order: 1886 (Asia Only)
- Tom Clancy's Rainbow Six Siege (Asia Only)
- Tom Clancy's The Division (Asia Only)
- Tomb Raider The Definitive Edition
- Uncharted Collection
- Uncharted 4: Kaizokuō to Saigo no Hihō
- Uncharted: Kodaishin no Hihō
- Until Dawn
- V! Yuusha no Kuse ni Namaikida R
- Wander to Kyozō
- Watch Dogs (Asia Only)
- Winning Eleven 2015 (Asia Only)
- Winning Eleven 2017 (Asia Only)
- Wipeout Omega Collection

== PlayStation Portable ==
- .hack//Link
- 7th Dragon 2020
- Ace Combat X: Skies of Deception
- Ace Combat X2: Joint Assault
- Armored Core: Formula Front International
- Assassin's Creed: Bloodlines
- Byte Hell 2000
- Bleach: Heat the Soul
- Bleach: Heat the Soul 2
- Bleach: Heat the Soul 3
- Bleach: Heat the Soul 4
- Bleach: Heat the Soul 5
- Bleach: Heat the Soul 6
- Bleach: Heat the Soul 7
- Bleach: Soul Carnival
- Bokujō Monogatari: Harvest Moon Boy and Girl
- Bokujō Monogatari: Sugar Mura to Minna no Negai
- Boku no Natsuyasumi Portable
- Boku no Natsuyasumi Portable 2
- Boku no Natsuyasumi 4
- Boku no Watashi no Katamari Damacy
- Breath of Fire III
- Chikyū Bōeigun 2 Portable
- Clank & Ratchet: Maru Hi Mission * Ignition
- Coded Arms
- Code Geass: Hangyaku no Lelōch – Lost Colors
- Conception: Ore no Kodomo o Unde Kure!!
- Crisis Core: Final Fantasy VII
- Dai-2-Ji Super Robot Taisen Z Hakai-hen
- Dai-2-Ji Super Robot Taisen Z Saisei-hen
- Danganronpa: Kibō no Gakuen to Zetsubō no Kōkōsei
- Dead or Alive Paradise
- Derby Time
- Dissidia Final Fantasy
- Dissidia Final Fantasy: Universal Tuning
- Dissidia 012 Final Fantasy
- Doko Demo Issho
- Doko Demo Issho: Let's Gakkō!
- Dragon Ball Z Tag VS
- Dragoneer's Aria
- The Legend of Heroes II: Prophecy of the Moonlight Witch
- The Legend of Heroes IV: A Tear of Vermillion
- The Legend of Heroes III: Song of the Ocean
- The Legend of Heroes: Trails from Zero
- The Legend of Heroes: Trails in the Sky
- The Legend of Heroes: Trails in the Sky SC
- The Legend of Heroes: Trails in the Sky the 3rd
- The Legend of Heroes: Trails to Azure
- The Legend of Nayuta: Boundless Trails
- Exit (Asia only)
- Fairy Tail: Portable Guild
- Fairy Tail: Portable Guild 2
- Fate/Extra
- Fate/Extra CCC
- Final Fantasy
- Final Fantasy II
- Final Fantasy IV: The Complete Collection
- Final Fantasy Tactics: The War of the Lions
- Final Fantasy Type-0
- God Eater Burst
- God Eater 2
- Gran Turismo
- Grand Knights History
- Gensō Suikoden: Tsumugareshi Hyakunen no Toki
- Gundam Assault Survive
- Gundam Battle Chronicle
- Gundam Battle Royale
- Gundam Battle Universe
- Gundam Memories: Tatakai no Kioku
- Initial D Street Stage
- Innocent Life: Shin Bokujō Monogatari (Asia only)
- Jeanne D'Arc
- Ken to Mahō to Gakuen Mono.
- Ken to Mahō to Gakuen Mono. 2
- Kenka Banchō 3: Zenkoku Seiha
- Kenka Banchō 4: Ichinen Sensō
- Kenka Banchō 5: Otoko no Hōsoku
- Kidō Senshi Gundam Seed: Rengō vs. Z.A.F.T. Portable
- Kidō Senshi Gundam: Shin Gihren no Yabō
- Kidō Senshi Gundam: Giren no Yabō – Axis no Kyōi
- Kidō Senshi Gundam: Giren no Yabō – Axis no Kyōi V
- Kidō Senshi Gundam: Gundam vs. Gundam
- Kidō Senshi Gundam: Gundam vs. Gundam Next Plus
- Kingdom Hearts Birth by Sleep
- Kingdom Hearts Birth by Sleep Final Mix
- K-On! Hōkago Live!!
- Kotoba no Puzzle: Mojipittan Daijiten
- Kuroko no Basuke: Kiseki no Game
- Kurohyō: Ryū ga Gotoku Shinshō
- Kurohyō 2: Ryū ga Gotoku Ashura-hen (Asia only)
- LocoRoco
- LocoRoco 2
- LittleBigPlanet (Asia only)
- Lumines
- Macross Ace Frontier
- Macross Ultimate Frontier
- Macross Triangle Frontier
- Magna Carta Portable
- Makai Senki Disgaea 2 Portable
- Mahjong Fight Club
- Mahō Shōjo Ririkaru NanohaA's Portable: The Battle of Aces
- Mahō Shōjo Ririkaru NanohaA's Portable: The Gears of Destiny
- Metal Gear Acid
- Metal Gear Acid 2
- Metal Gear Solid: Portable Ops
- Metal Gear Solid: Peace Walker
- Minna no Golf Portable
- Minna no Golf Portable 2
- Minna no Tennis Portable
- MonHun Nikki: Poka Poka Ailu Mura
- Monster Hunter Portable
- Monster Hunter Portable 2nd G
- Monster Hunter Portable 3rd
- Mugen Kairō
- Namco Museum
- Naruto Shippuden: Narutimate Accel 3
- Naruto: Narutimett Portable Mugenjō no Maki
- Naruto Shippuden: Narutimate Impact
- Need for Speed: Underground Rivals
- Ore no Imōto ga Konna ni Kawaii Wake ga Nai Portable ga Tsuzuku Wake ga Nai
- Patapon
- Patapon 2
- Patapon 3
- Persona (Asia only)
- Persona 3: Portable
- Phantasy Star Portable
- Phantasy Star Portable 2
- PoPoLoCrois Monogatari: Pietro Ōji no Bōken
- Pop'n Music Portable 2
- Photo Kano
- Prince of Persia: Rival Swords (Asia only)
- Puzzle Bobble Pocket (Asia only)
- Pipo Saru Academia
- Pipo Saru Academia 2
- Princess Crown
- Puzzle Bobble Pocket (Asia only)
- Queen's Blade: Spiral Chaos
- Quiz Kidō Senshi Gundam: Toi Senshi DX
- Ratchet & Clank 5: Gekitotsu! Dodeka Ginga no MiriMiri Gundan
- Rengoku: Tower of Purgatory
- Ridge Racers
- Sakura Wars 1 & 2
- Samurai Dou Portable
- Samurai Dou 2 Portable
- Saru Get You P!
- Saru Get You: Pipo Saru Racer
- Saru Get You: SaruSaru Daisakusen
- SD Gundam G Generation Portable
- SD Gundam G Generation World
- SD Gundam G Generation Overworld
- Sengoku BASARA Battle Heroes
- Shirokishi Monogatari Episode Portable: Dogma Wars
- Shin Sangoku Musou: Multi Raid
- Space Invaders Extreme (Asia only)
- Shining Hearts
- Shining Blade
- Shinseiki Evangelion 2 -Another Cases
- Shutokō Battle
- SoulCalibur: Broken Destiny
- Star Ocean: First Departure
- Star Ocean: Second Evolution
- Super Robot Taisen MX Portable
- Suzumiya Haruhi no Yakusoku
- Summon Night 3
- Summon Night 4
- Summon Night 5
- Tales of Destiny 2
- Tales of Eternia
- Tales of Phantasia
- Tales of Phantasia: Narikiri Dungeon X
- Tales of Rebirth
- Tales of the World: Radiant Mythology
- Tales of the World: Radiant Mythology 2
- Tales of the World: Radiant Mythology 3
- Talkman
- Talkman: Euro
- Tekken: Dark Resurrection
- Tekken 6
- Tenchi no Mon (Asia Only)
- Tenchi no Mon 2: Busōden (Asia Only)
- Tenchu 4 Plus
- Tenchu: Shinobi Taizen
- The Idolm@ster SP: Missing Moon
- The Idolm@ster SP: Perfect Sun
- The Idolm@ster SP: Wandering Star
- Toaru Kagaku no Chō Denjihō
- Toaru Majutsu no Index
- ToraDora! Portable!
- Toriko: Gourmet Survival
- Toukiden
- Valhalla Knights
- Valhalla Knights 2
- Valkyrie Profile: Lenneth
- Vampire Chronicle: The Chaos Tower
- Winning Eleven 9: Ubiquitous Evolution
- Winning Eleven 10: Ubiquitous Evolution
- Ys I & II Chronicles
- Ys Seven
- Ys vs. Trails in the Sky
- Yuusha 30
- Yūsha no Kuse ni Namaikida
- Yūsha no Kuse ni Namaikida Or 2
- Wild ARMs XF
- Yūsha no Kuse ni Namaikida: 3D
- Z.H.P. Unlosing Ranger VS Darkdeath Evilman
- Zettai Zetsumei Toshi 3

== PlayStation Vita ==
- Akiba's Trip 2 (Asia only)
- Assassin's Creed III: Lady Liberty (Asia only)
- BioHazard: Revelations 2
- BlazBlue: Continuum Shift Extend (Asia only)
- Bullet Girls
- Chikyū Boueigun 3 Portable
- Ciel Nosurge: Ushinawareta Hoshi e Sasagu Uta
- Dai-3-Ji Super Robot Taisen Z Jigoku-hen
- Danganronpa 1–2 Reload
- Danganronpa Another Episode: Zettai Zetsubō Shōjo
- Dead or Alive 5 Plus (Asia only)
- Demon Gaze
- Dragon Quest Builders
- Dream Club Zero Portable
- The Legend of Heroes: Trails of Cold Steel
- Fate/Extella
- Fate/hollow ataraxia
- Fate/stay night Réalta Nua
- Freedom Wars
- God Eater 2
- Gravity Daze
- Gundam Breaker
- IA/VT Colorful
- Katamari Damacy No-Vita
- Kidō Senshi Gundam Seed Battle Destiny
- Mahjong Fight Club: Shinsei Zenkoku Taisen Han
- Makai Senki Disgaea 3 Return
- Makai Senki Disgaea 4 Return
- Metal Gear Solid HD Collection
- Minna no Golf 6
- Muramasa Rebirth
- New Danganronpa V3: Minna no Koroshiai Shingakki
- Ninja Gaiden Sigma Plus (Asia only)
- Ninja Gaiden Sigma Plus 2 (Asia only)
- Ore no Shikabane o Koete Yuke 2
- Persona 4 Golden
- Ragnarok Odyssey
- Ragnarok Odyssey ACE (Asia only)
- Ridge Racer
- Sengoku Musou 4
- Shin Kamaitachi no Yoru: 11 Hitome no Suspect
- Shinobido 2: Sange
- Shin Sangoku Musou Next
- Soul Sacrifice
- Soul Sacrifice Delta
- Sword Art Online: Lost Song
- Tales of Innocence R
- Toukiden
- Uncharted: Chizu no Bōken no Hajimari
- Ys: Memories of Celceta
