= BigHit Series =

- Official BigHit Series badges and banner used on PlayStation game covers
- Platforms: PlayStation 2, PlayStation 3, PlayStation Portable, PlayStation Vita

BigHit Series are video games for the Korean Sony PlayStation 2, PlayStation 3 and PlayStation Portable consoles that have been officially re-released at a lower price by Sony and third parties that meet specific criteria. While the term "BigHit series" only applies to selections in South Korea, equivalent programs exist in North America (as "Greatest Hits"), PAL territories (as "Essentials") and Japan and Asia (as "The Best").

== History ==
The BigHit Series program was first released for PlayStation 2 on October 1, 2004, by Sony Computer Entertainment Korea (SCEK) for games that were distributed in South Korea. SCEK's official press release on September 30, 2004, stated (modified translation) that users of the PlayStation 2 hardware in Korea for the first time can purchase popular classic PlayStation 2 games, and enjoy them at an affordable cost; helping users to an existing genre preference due to several issues of being out-of-stock, or the user did not try the game.

All BigHit Series games were released at the price of 26,800KRW. Historically exchange rates dating back to October 2004 show that was slightly above US$23.25 (US$1 ~= 1147 KRW)

The translated press release by SCEK suggests that there might have been 6 games already released to PlayStation 2 owners in June of the same year; leading to 15 BigHit series games being released by the start of October 2004. The first 7 - 15 games released under the BigHit series title were : Minna no Golf 3, Gitaroo Man, Time Crisis 3, The Lord of the Rings: Return of the King, Need for Speed: Underground, SSX 3, WWE Smackdown! Shut Your Mouth, Final Fantasy X International, and Shin Sangoku Musō 2.

== List of titles ==
=== PlayStation 2 ===
- Ace Combat 5: The Unsung War
- Ace Combat Zero: The Belkan War
- Ape Escape 3
- Dark Chronicle
- Dark Cloud
- Devil May Cry 3
- Disgaea: Hour of Darkness
- Drakengard 2
- Dynasty Warriors 3
- Dynasty Warriors 4
- Dynasty Warriors 5
- EyeToy: Monkey Mania
- EyeToy: Play
- Fatal Frame
- Fatal Frame II: Crimson Butterfly
- Final Fantasy XII
- Final Fantasy X
- Genji: Dawn of the Samurai
- Gitaroo Man
- God of War
- God of War II
- Gran Turismo 4
- Gran Turismo Concept
- Hot Shots Golf 3
- Hot Shots Golf Fore!
- Hot Shots Tennis
- ICO
- Jake Hunter
- Katamari Damacy
- Killzone
- Mad Maestro!
- Metal Gear Solid 2: Sons of Liberty
- Metal Gear Solid 3: Snake Eater
- Need for Speed: Underground
- Onimusha: Dawn of Dreams
- Persona 3 FES
- Persona 4
- Prince of Persia: The Sands of Time
- Prince of Persia: The Two Thrones
- Prince of Persia: Warrior Within
- Raiden III
- Ratchet & Clank: Going Commando
- Ratchet & Clank: Up Your Arsenal
- Ratchet: Deadlocked
- Resident Evil 4
- Romance of the Three Kingdoms IX
- Samurai Warriors 3: Empires
- Samurai Warriors 4: Empires
- Sega Rally 2006
- Shadow of the Colossus
- Shining Tears
- Sly 2: Band of Thieves
- Sly 3: Honor Among Thieves
- Sly Cooper and the Thievius Raccoonus
- SOCOM 3 U.S. Navy SEALs
- SOCOM II U.S. Navy SEALs
- Sonic Heroes
- Sonic Mega Collection Plus
- Sonic Riders
- SSX 3
- SSX Tricky
- Street Fighter Anniversary Collection
- Tales of Destiny 2
- Tales of Legendia
- Tekken 4
- Tekken 5
- Tekken Tag Tournament
- The Lord of the Rings: Return of the King
- Time Crisis 3
- Viewtiful Joe
- Virtua Fighter 4 Evolution
- WWE SmackDown! Here Comes the Pain
- WWE SmackDown! Shut Your Mouth
- WWE Smackdown vs. Raw 2007
- WWE Smackdown vs. Raw 2008
- We Love Katamari
- Yakuza
- Zone of the Enders: The 2nd Runner

=== PlayStation 3 ===
- Ace Combat: Assault Horizon
- Agarest Senki
- Akiba's Trip: Undead & Undressed
- Armored Core: For Answer
- Atelier Meruru: The Apprentice of Arland
- Atelier Rorona: The Alchemist of Arland
- Atelier Totori: The Adventurer of Arland
- Battlefield: Bad Company 2
- Bayonetta
- BlazBlue: Calamity Trigger
- Call of Duty 4: Modern Warfare
- Cross Edge
- Devil May Cry 4
- Dragon's Dogma
- Dynasty Warriors 7
- Everybody's Golf 5
- FIFA 11
- Final Fantasy XIII
- Folklore
- God of War III
- Hakuna Matata
- Infamous
- Killzone 2
- Lair
- LittleBigPlanet
- Metal Gear Solid 4: Guns of the Patriots
- Mobile Suit Gundam: Extreme Vs.
- Naruto Shippuden: Ultimate Ninja Storm 2
- Naruto: Ultimate Ninja Storm
- Ninja Gaiden Sigma
- Pro Evolution Soccer 2009
- Pro Evolution Soccer 2010
- Pro Evolution Soccer 2011
- Pro Evolution Soccer 2013
- Ratchet & Clank Future: Tools of Destruction
- Resident Evil 5
- Resistance 2
- Resistance: Fall of Man
- Ridge Racer 7
- Sengoku Basara 4
- Sengoku Basara: Samurai Heroes
- Sengoku Basara
- Soulcalibur IV
- Street Fighter IV
- Super Street Fighter IV
- Tales of Graces f
- Tales of Vesperia
- Tekken 6
- The Idolmaster One For All
- Tom Clancy's Ghost Recon Advanced Warfighter 2
- Tom Clancy's Rainbow Six: Vegas 2
- Trinity Universe
- Uncharted 2: Among Thieves
- Uncharted: Drake's Fortune
- Virtua Fighter 5
- Yakuza 3

=== PlayStation Portable ===
- Ace Combat X: Skies of Deception
- Disgaea: Hour of Darkness
- Dissidia Final Fantasy
- Dragon Ball Z: Shin Budokai 2
- Innocent Life
- Katamari Damacy
- Kingdom of Paradise
- LocoRoco
- Lost Regnum: Makutsu no Koutei
- Monster Hunter Portable 3rd
- Patapon
- Patapon 2
- Persona 3 Portable
- Ridge Racers
- Ridge Racers 2
- SD Gundam G Generation World
- SOCOM U.S. Navy SEALs: Fireteam Bravo
- Sengoku Basara
- Talkman
- Tekken 5
- Tekken 6
- Untold Legends: The Warrior's Code
- Valkyrie Profile: Lenneth

=== PlayStation Vita ===
- Akiba's Trip: Undead & Undressed
- Dragon's Crown
- God Eater 2
- Gravity Rush
- Muramasa: The Demon Blade
- Persona 4 Golden
- Ragnarok Odyssey
- Ragnarok Odyssey ACE
- Steins;Gate
- Steins;Gate 0
