= Akiba's Beat =

2016 video game

- Developer: Acquire
- Publishers: JP: Acquire; NA: Xseed Games; EU: PQube
- Director: Kohta Takano
- Series: Akiba's Trip
- Engine: Unity
- Platforms: PlayStation 4, PlayStation Vita
- Release: PlayStation 4: JP: December 15, 2016; NA: May 16, 2017; EU: May 19, 2017; PlayStation Vita: JP: April 27, 2017; NA: May 16, 2017; EU: May 19, 2017
- Genre: Action role-playing
- Mode: Single-player

Akiba's Beat is an action role-playing video game for the PlayStation Vita and PlayStation 4 video game consoles. It is the third entry in the Akiba series, after the Japan-only Akiba's Trip for PlayStation Portable and the worldwide release Akiba's Trip: Undead & Undressed, though it is the first entry that plays as a JRPG. The game was released on December 15, 2016 in Japan, and on May 16, 2017 in North America and May 19 in Europe, published by Marvelous USA and PQube.

== Gameplay ==
The game is considered a follow-up to the two Akiba's Trip games, but does not share any of its gameplay mechanics, instead focusing more on JRPG related features and structures. The game plays as an action RPG, with battles initiated once the player moves the playable character into an enemy character, sending involved characters into a separate battle screen.

== Story ==
The game takes place in Akihabara and stars protagonist and NEET Asahi Tachibana, living a regular life after deciding to drop out of college. Transfer student, Saki Hoshino, recently moved to the area and runs into Asahi. Other main characters include Japanese idol Riyu Momose, and the very young looking Yamato Hongo. The game involves the party getting stuck in a world of delusions, trapped in a repeating day-long cycle on a Sunday. The party also keeps coming across a strange, unidentifiable man in a pink sash, that always seems to be around when unexplainable incidents occur.

== Development ==
The game was first announced on May 30, 2016, as developer Acquire's first action role-playing video game. Information on the title, such as it being a game for the PlayStation Vita and PlayStation 4, was first revealed in an issue of Famitsu. The game was 75% complete as of the time of the announcement. On June 7, 2016, Xseed Games announced they would be releasing the game in English on both platforms. The game is the second of three Akiba games to be translated to English; the original Akiba's Trip for PlayStation Portable was never translated or released in English, but the second game, Akiba's Trip: Undead and Undressed, was translated and published by Xseed Games. The game's story was announced to be more serious in theme than the prior two games in the series. Despite this, similar to the prior games, it will still take place in a realistic recreation of Japan's Akihabara, coupled with surreal dungeon areas more akin to games such as Persona 3. Key staff for the game include director Kohta Takano of Divine Gate, character designs by UCMM, and a theme song titled "Again", sung by ClariS. On October 27, 2016, PQube confirmed a European release.

The game was originally scheduled for release in Japan during the fall of 2016, but was later delayed to winter of that year, before the release was narrowed down to December. The PlayStation 4 version launched on December 16, 2016, with the PlayStation Vita release pushed back to March 16, 2017. Both PS4 and PS Vita versions were released on PSN digitally and retail on May 16, 2017.

== Reception ==
Reception

Aggregate score
Aggregator	Score
Metacritic	PS4: 55/100

Upon the PlayStation 4 version's release, the game failed to chart in the weekly Media Create Top 20. In Famitsu's Top 30, Akiba's Beat ranked as the 26th best selling of that tracking window with 5248 units sold, for a 20-40% sell-through. This figure was roughly a tenth of what Akiba's Trip: Undead & Undressed sold in a similar period of time on PlayStation Vita and PlayStation 3 back in 2013. The magazine's reviewer gave the PlayStation 4 version of the game a 27/40.

The western release received mixed to negative reviews with Cory Arnold of Destructoid awarding the game 3.5 (out of 10) citing "If Akiba's Trip is the shirtless jock who kicks the door in with beers in hand, Akiba's Beat is the timid cocktail-drinker standing in the corner with one hand in his pocket. Technically functional, but spiritually dead."
