= Ryōko Kihara =

Japanese composer and pianist

Ryoko Kihara (Often spelled as “Lioko Kihara” in her published works, 樹原涼子, Kihara Ryōko) is a Japanese composer, pianist, music educator, and author.

== Biography ==
She was born in Kumamoto City, Kumamoto Prefecture and later pursued musical studies at the Musashino Academia Musicae. She is best known for her Piano Land series of instructional books for the piano. First published in 1991, the series has had a major influence on music pedagogy in Japan and is regarded as one of the most standard textbooks in piano education in the country.

Kihara is also a composer; she composes classical music and music for video games. Her works for piano are popular among Japanese pianists and students. Japanese pianists such as Izumi Tateno have incorporated her works into their repertoire. Almost all of her music is published by Ongaku No Tomo Corporation.

Kihara's son Konosuke Kihara is also a composer and also composes music for video games.

== Major works ==
=== Piano instruction books ===
==== Piano Land series ====
"Piano Land (ピアノランド)" (In 5 Volumes, 1991~92)

"Piano Land; Techniques for Fun (ピアノランド たのしいテクニック)" (In 3 Volumes, 1993~94)

"Piano Land; For Concert (ピアノランド コンサート)" (In 3 Volumes, 2000)

"Preparatory; Piano Land (プレピアノランド)" (In 3 Volumes, 2002)

"Piano Land; Scale, Mode, and Arpeggio (ピアノランド スケール・モード・アルペジオ)" (2016)

"Piano Land; Scale Practice Book for Children (ピアノランド こどものスケールブック)" (2021)

==== Other ====
"Opening Your Ears; How to Hear Chords (耳を開く 聴きとり術 コード編)" (2014)

"12 Doors for Improvisation (即興演奏12の扉)" (2019)

=== Music ===
==== Piano music ====
"A Small Box in My Heart (こころの小箱, Kokoro no Kobako)" (Suite for solo piano & piano four hands, 2011)

"Rhapsody No. 1 (ラプソディ第1番)" (For piano four hands, 2012)

"A Dream in a Dream (夢の中の夢, Yume no Naka no Yume)" (Suite for solo piano, 2012)

"A Gentle Look (やさしいまなざし, Yasashii Manazashi)" (Suite for solo piano, 2013)

"Wind in the Sky (天空の風, Tenkuu no Kaze)" (For piano left hand, dedicated to Izumi Tateno, 2017)

"The Trilogy of Seasons (季節の三部作, Kisetsu no Sanbusaku)" (Suite for piano left hand, dedicated to Izumi Tateno, 2020)

"Rhapsody No. 2 (ラプソディ第2番)" (For solo piano & piano four hands, 2020)

==== Vocal & choral music ====
"Ballade for Children (子供達へのバラード, Kodomotachi eno Barado)" (1993)

"Flower (花, Hana)" (Main Theme Song of a Video Game "Ore no Shikabane o Koeteike", 1999)

"My Wish ~On the Day of Christmas~ (願い ～クリスマスの日に～, Negai ~Kurisumasu no Hi ni~)" (2005)

"My Wish ~Getting Over the Great Earthquake~ (願い ～震災を乗り越えて～, Negai ~Shinsai o Norikoete~)" (2013)

==== Game music ====
Momotaro Densetsu (桃太郎伝説, 1987)

Momotaro Dentetsu (桃太郎電鉄, 1988)

Linda Cube (リンダキューブ, 1995~97)

Ore no Shikabane wo Koete Yuke (俺の屍を越えてゆけ, 1999)

=== Writing ===
"Want to Play the Piano? (ピアノを弾きたいあなたへ, Piano o Hikitai Anatae)" (2009/2015, Kodansha) ISBN: 978-4062815857

"Raising Children in the Kiharas ~Days of Piano Land & Smiling (樹原家の子育て ～ピアノランドと笑顔の毎日, Kiharake no Kosodate ~Piano Land to Egao no Mainichi)" (2010, Kadokawa Shoten) ISBN: 978-4048850704
