= LocoRoco Midnight Carnival =

2009 video game

LocoRoco Midnight Carnival!
- Developer: Japan Studio
- Publisher: Sony Computer Entertainment
- Platform: PlayStation Portable
- Release: NA: October 29, 2009; EU: 2009; JP: November 1, 2009
- Genres: Platform, Puzzle
- Mode: Single-player

LocoRoco Midnight Carnival is a 2009 platform video game developed and published by Sony Computer Entertainment for the PlayStation Portable. The game was released on PlayStation Network. It is a spin-off that continues the story of LocoRoco 2.

An emulated version of the game was released digitally for the PlayStation 4 and PlayStation 5 in July 2022.

== Plot ==
LocoRoco Midnight Carnival is based on a secret carnival-like base, created by the BuiBui, a red, mischievous version of the MuiMui. The title shows that the LocoRoco were quietly sleeping, while in the background, a BuiBui pulls on a nearby lever (cleverly designed to just look like a star), opening a trapdoor under the LocoRoco, sending them into a chute, taking them into a cannon, which shows the LocoRoco "Boing!" power. The cannon sends the LocoRoco into the BuiBui's secret base, the midnight carnival.

=== Mobile version ===
A port was released for the Xperia Play. It was available via PlayStation Network for Japanese customers whom had purchased the NTT DoCoMo variant of Xperia Play.

== Reception ==
LocoRoco Midnight Carnival received "mixed or average" reviews, according to review aggregator Metacritic.

Reception

Aggregate score
Aggregator	Score
Metacritic	73/100

Review scores
Publication	Score
GameRevolution	3/10
GameSpot	6.5/10
GamesRadar+	3.5/5
IGN	7.5/10
Pocket Gamer	3.5/5
Push Square	7/10
VideoGamer.com	8/10
