= LocoRoco =

2006 video game

- European cover art
- Developer: Japan Studio (Note: Developed as Japan Studio for the PlayStation 4 version. Mobile version developed by Gamelion.)
- Publisher: Sony Computer Entertainment (Note: Released as Sony Interactive Entertainment on the PlayStation 4. Mobile version published by Glu Mobile.)
- Director: Tsutomu Kouno
- Designer: Tsutomu Kouno
- Artist: Keigo Tsuchiya
- Composers: Nobuyuki Shimizu; Kemmei Adachi
- Platforms: PlayStation Portable, mobile phone, PlayStation 4
- Release: PlayStation Portable: EU: June 23, 2006; AU: June 29, 2006; JP: July 13, 2006; NA: September 5, 2006; Mobile: JP: February 16, 2007; NA: May 15, 2009; PlayStation 4: WW: May 9, 2017
- Genres: Platform, puzzle
- Mode: Single-player

LocoRoco (Note: Japanese: ロコロコ, Hepburn: Rocoroco) is a 2006 platform video game developed and published by Sony Computer Entertainment for the PlayStation Portable. The game was conceived by Tsutomu Kouno, who strived to create a game that was different from other titles being released for the PSP at the time. After demonstrating a prototype of the core gameplay to his management, Kouno was able to complete development over the course of a year and a half. In LocoRoco, the player must tilt the environment by using the shoulder buttons on the PSP in order to maneuver the LocoRoco, multi-colored jelly-like characters, through each level, being aided by other odd residents while avoiding hazards and the deadly Moja Troop, to reach an end goal.

Along the way, the LocoRoco can grow in size by eating special berries, and then can be split and rejoined to pass the LocoRoco through narrow spaces. The game's bright and colorful visuals and dynamic music soundtrack were hallmarks of the game, earning it several awards from the gaming press in 2006. While the game did not sell high volumes, its success led to the development of three other LocoRoco titles – two sequels for the PlayStation Portable: LocoRoco 2 and LocoRoco Midnight Carnival, and a spin-off for the PlayStation 3 titled LocoRoco Cocoreccho!

A remastered version of the game was released in 2017 for the PlayStation 4.

== Plot ==
Living peacefully on a faraway planet, the LocoRoco and their friends, the Mui Mui, help grow vegetation and look after nature, making the planet a pleasant place to be, playing and singing the days away. When the Moja Troop comes to the planet to take it over, the LocoRoco do not know how to fight against these invaders from outer space. As such, the player assumes the role of "the planet" that is capable of guiding the LocoRoco around to defeat the Moja Troop and rescue the remaining LocoRoco, returning the planet to its peaceful ways.

== Gameplay ==
The Yellow LocoRoco Kulche moving about the world currently tilted to the right; a berry that will increase Kulche's size is to the far right, while a Mui Mui figure as at the bottom. A Pickory is shown below Kulche.

LocoRoco is divided into 5 worlds each consisting of 8 levels. In each level, the goal is to reach the end point of the level, with the player scored on the number of LocoRoco found, the time to complete the level, and other factors. There are six varieties of LocoRoco in the game, identified by their color, appearance, and musical voice, but outside of the first "Yellow" one, the rest are unlocked as the player completes the level. The player can then opt which LocoRoco they want to use for a level, however, this selection has no fundamental gameplay effects and only changes the songs used. LocoRoco act as blobs of gelatin, deforming from their normally round shape when demanded by the environment. Certain beings in the world can change the default shape of the LocoRoco into other forms, such as squares or triangles, which lasts until the end of the level or they encounter another similar being.

The player starts with a single LocoRoco. When this LocoRoco eats a berry, it grows by one, up to a maximum size of twenty. The single large LocoRoco may be split into individual beings by tapping a face button or through specific points on the level, while individual LocoRoco can merge back into a single being by holding down a face button. Manipulation of the LocoRoco in this manner may be necessary to guide them to the finish; while the single large LocoRoco is easier to control, small passages can only be navigated by individual LocoRoco. The player can lose LocoRoco if they are touched by harmful objects or they run into the Moja, and the player will have to restart the level if they lose all their LocoRoco. The player does not otherwise directly control the LocoRoco, but instead controls the planet itself, tilting the planet using the shoulder buttons. This causes the LocoRoco to roll in the direction of tilt, as well as causing certain mechanical objects such as platforms to also tilt. The player can also cause the LocoRoco to jump by holding and releasing both shoulder buttons; this not only allows the LocoRoco a way to cross gaps, but to burst through walls as well as harm the Moja without taking damage. As the player collects more Loco Roco in a level, the music gains more voices, each Loco Roco singing a part in the overall song.

Throughout the levels are areas that require a minimum number of LocoRoco in order to cause them to sing and wake up one of the planet's odd residents, who will then reward the player with an item for their "Loco House". There are also hidden Mui Mui throughout the levels to be found. Levels also contain "Pickories" which can be collected by the LocoRoco and are used as a form of currency to play two mini-games outside of the main game. The mini-games are "Mui Mui Crane", a variation of a crane game, and "Chuppa Chuppa" that use Chuppa, bird-like launchers for the LocoRoco, to navigate a long course. Both mini-games grant additional Loco House parts and Pickories as prizes. The player can use the accumulated Loco House parts to create a course that the Loco Roco will automatically navigate, with additional parts that can be collected by directing the course appropriately. A Loco Editor is also an unlockable feature in the game, creating an interactive course with a start and finish using the Loco House parts.

== Development ==
Tsutomu Kouno's original sketch for Loco Roco, drawn on a PDA, led to his idea of "rotating the landscape" as a key game mechanic.

LocoRoco was envisioned by Tsutomu Kouno, who had previously worked on the development of Ico. While on a train during the second quarter of 2004, Kouno had used a PDA to sketch a game that would involve multiple similar characters that would not be in direct control of the player. He realized the planet-tilting aspect after seeing how rotating the phone with the sketch around would lead to a compelling game. At that time, the PlayStation Portable was nearing release, and Kouno felt the unit's shoulder buttons would be appropriate for the tilting controls. Kouno also opted to develop for the PSP to break the mold of other, more complicated sequels from PlayStation 2 games that were being developed for the unit and instead create something that "really seemed at home on the PSP". Kouno also wanted "every aspect of the game [...] to be unique", and led to his choices for graphics and music in the game.

Three concepts were part of Kouno's vision for the game, "easy to play, fun and to have dramatic visuals". Kouno sought not only to make the game accessible to younger players, but also to a wider, international audience. While his team experimented with different control schemes for the game, they recognized that the simple tilting controls would be easily learned by children as well as those outside Japan. This approach also led to the use of a new "language" for the music, instead of relying on Japanese works which would not be understood by the international audience. However, despite the simple controls, Kouno noted they included deep gameplay around those that would require players to master to gain all the collectibles in the game.

Kouno opted to keep the game in 2D instead of the more popular 3D to maintain the simplicity of the game. The Loco Roco team had experimented with different designs for the characters and world, including claymation, papercraft, and detailed textures, but settled on the resulting patterns not only to convey a "bright, cheerful" world, but as well as to keep budget costs down, no longer having a need to seek artists for textures. Kouno drew upon his interest in the natural world to design the other characters in the game; for example, one character was based on the appearance of his pet tropical fish. Kouno found that using 2D graphics allowed him to constantly present the faces of the LocoRoco and other beings within the game, and used that to convey a constant sense of emotion from all the characters. Maya was used to construct the levels and place hazards and obstacles. The graphics themselves were based on using and animating Bézier curves, a feature of the PSP's software capabilities.

Kouno had attempted to present the idea at pitch meetings twice in the early part of 2005 but was turned away. While management was able to understand the mechanic of tilting the world, they could not understand Kouno's vision of applying artificial intelligence to the LocoRoco or other creatures in the game. On the second rejection, the management staff suggested that Kouno return with something more concrete to explain his ideas. Kouno spent one month with a four-person team to create a simple pre-prototype version of the game that demonstrated the rolling gameplay aspect. The pre-prototype version was well received, and Kouno was given further resources to develop the full game. A complete prototype was created by an eight-person team over three months to establish the rest of the game's core mechanics, including the joining and splitting of the Loco Roco and the dynamic music. The remainder of the game was completed in the following 11 months by the full 16-person staff at Sony Computer Entertainment Japan. The game was released in 2006 in Europe on June 23, Australia on June 29, Japan on July 13, and North America on September 5.

== Soundtrack ==
Track #5: "Bu Bu Poruche", from the LocoRoco Original Soundtrack
LocoRoco's soundtrack uses a fictional language created by Kouno to appeal to an international audience.

The soundtrack for LocoRoco is based on a fictional language created by Kouno to avoid alienating foreign players by using Japanese music. Kouno created the language by compiling a list of interesting words in katakana, then altering the words slightly to make them sound cool in Japanese as to mask their origins. Kouno then sent the lyrics along with some of his preferred reggae, soul and R&B music to the composers, Nobuyuki Shimizu and Kemmei Adachi, to complete the soundtrack. Kouno requested that the composers use as little electronic-sounding instruments as possible to give the music a feeling of "live sound". The team ultimately created about 60 songs to be used in the game. While the soundtrack had many different themes, Kouno felt that the fictional LocoRoco language helped to unify the songs across the game.

The LocoRoco Original Soundtrack: LocoRoco No Uta was published by Columbia Records and released in October 2006 in Japan. The album contains 42 tracks from the game.

== Versions ==
=== Demos ===
Following the release of Firmware 2.7 on April 25, 2006, a downloadable demo of LocoRoco was released on the game's Japanese website and was the first Sony-sanctioned user-downloadable game for the PSP. A demo localized for western countries was released in June 2006, shortly before the game's full European release. It includes one level that will take the player around 5–15 minutes to complete, depending on the number of secret areas the player encounters. A special Halloween-themed demo was released for download on October 26, 2006, It featured some exclusive graphics and objects, like Jack-o-lanterns, spirits, and more. Few puzzles were implemented. A Christmas-themed demo was released for download on December 11, 2006. It featured some exclusive graphics like Santa's sleigh and more. A unique LocoRoco song is implemented.

=== Mobile version ===
A mobile version of LocoRoco, LocoRoco Mobile, was created for distribution via i-mode, a wireless service in Japan, and was made available as a pre-installed application for Sony Ericsson SO703i devices on February 16, 2007. The mobile game has since been released in western countries by developer Gamelion and publisher Glu Mobile as LocoRoco Hi on May 15, 2009.

== Reception ==
Reception

Aggregate scores
Aggregator	Score
GameRankings	85%
Metacritic	83/100

Review scores
Publication	Score
1Up.com	B+
Eurogamer	9/10
Famitsu	34/40
GamePro	3/5
GameSpot	7.7/10
GameSpy	3.5/5
IGN	9/10
PALGN	8/10
Pocket Gamer	4.5/5
X-Play	4/5

LocoRoco has received mostly positive reviews from critics. The game was consistently praised for its bright and bold graphics. Charles Herold of the New York Times compared the graphics to Katamari Damacy, calling them "simple" and "pretty" while Sam Kennedy of 1UP considered it akin to "playing out an adorable cartoon". The unique environments of each level were also credited to help the game's charm, with Kristan Reed of Eurogamer believing that the game presents a "look and feel unlike anything we've seen before" and that shows "a truly brilliant realisation of how to take 2D gaming into uncharted territory." The music of the game was considered to be "quirky and catchy", with Will Tuttle of GameSpy saying that "there's a good chance that you'll be humming some of the tunes all day". The game, at times, was compared to a "slow-motion version of Sonic the Hedgehog" with the player controlling the LocoRoco as they move up and down hills and through loop-de-loops in the level. This gameplay allows the game to be easily accessible to players, with IGN's Juan Castro noting that the controls are "not simplistic so much as it's refreshingly elegant", and Kennedy commenting that while LocoRoco is not perfect, it was "perfect for the PSP". As noted by Neil McGreevy of the BBC, LocoRoco "is the best game Nintendo never made."

A common complaint from game reviewers was the repetitive nature of the game, as no new gameplay mechanics are introduced after the player learns to roll and jump, and that the levels are "far from challenging". However, these reviewers also commented that the monotonous gameplay is not as significant an issue with a gaming system like the PSP that encourages shorter play sessions. Reviewers also commented on the length of the game, considering it short with only a few extras that would add some additional enjoyment after completing the main game.

LocoRoco won two awards at the 2006 BAFTA Games Awards for "Best Children's Game" and "Best Character", and was nominated for six additional awards: "Best Audio", "Best Original Score", "Best Innovation", "Artistic Achievement", "Best Gameplay" and "Best Casual and Social Game". LocoRoco also won two awards at the 10th Annual Interactive Achievement Awards for "Children's Game of the Year" and "Outstanding Achievement in Original Music Composition", in addition to being nominated for "Outstanding Innovation in Gaming" and "Handheld Game of the Year". The Associated Press named LocoRoco its handheld game of the year for 2006.

Prior to its release in North America, 1UP blogger Alejandro Quan-Madrid equated the Moja characters in LocoRoco to blackface, and citing the game as an example of "institutionalized racism that needs calling out". Quan-Madrid and 1UP reporter Jemery Parish noted that the Japanese culture does not have the same racial population as western countries like the United States, and as such, blackface or other similar representations of black persons are taken for granted in that country, and localization usually handles such issues. Quan-Madrid called on Sony to make a simple color change to the Moja, similar to what Capcom had done for the character of Oil Man in Mega Man Powered Up. Developers for the game, including Kouno, noted that the Moja character design was based on the hairstyle of Keigo Tsuchiya, the game's artist, at the time of development, and did not mean to imply any racist tones. The accusation of racism came days before a similar charge against Sony for an advertisement for the white-colored PSP, portraying a white woman subjugating a black woman.

The Yellow LocoRoco, as seen on the game's cover, has become a mascot for the PSP system.

Sales of LocoRoco were not strong in Japan, with just more than 30,000 copies sold the first week, and about 170,000 in total sales for the year. The game was more successful in Europe and North America, prompting Sony to start development of additional titles.

== Sequels ==
LocoRoco Cocoreccho is a LocoRoco program for the PlayStation 3, released in September 2007 as a downloadable title through the PlayStation Store. It is described by Sony as an "interactive screensaver," rather than a game. Instead of tilting the world, the game instead puts the player in control of a butterfly that will draw LocoRoco to it, guiding them to sleeping LocoRoco to wake them up and collect enough LocoRoco to progress to other parts of the single stage.

LocoRoco 2, a sequel to the original LocoRoco, was officially announced at the 2008 Tokyo Game Show though Phil Harrison, Sony's worldwide studios chief, revealed the game to be in development during an interview at the 2007 D.I.C.E. Summit. The game was released worldwide between late 2008 and early 2009.

A third PSP LocoRoco game, LocoRoco Midnight Carnival, is a Halloween-themed spin-off title which features an enhanced bounce skill called "Boing!" The game was digitally released on October 29, 2009, for North American and European areas, and on November 1, 2009, in Japan for the launch of the PSP Go. There are also LocoRoco costumes for LittleBigPlanet.

LocoRocos appear in the 2024 PlayStation 5 game Astro Bot, having their own themed level called Going Loco in the game's fourth area and a remixed theme song that plays in it as well with the main bot who leads Astro to the level after the boss being the Yellow LocoRoco and the bots that can be rescued in the level being the other five LocoRocos from the first game. They also assist Astro in the game's finale with the rest of the PlayStation Armada against Nebulax.
