= Ore no Shikabane o Koete Yuke =

1999 role-playing video game

- Developers: Alfa System; MARS Corporation (Note: Additional work by Sony Computer Entertainment Japan.)
- Publisher: Sony Computer Entertainment
- Director: Shoji Masuda
- Designer: Shoji Masuda
- Programmer: Hiroshi Hasegawa
- Artist: Makoto Sajima
- Writer: Shoji Masuda
- Composer: Ryōko Kihara
- Platforms: PlayStation; PlayStation Portable
- Release: PlayStation: JP: June 17, 1999; PSP: JP: November 10, 2011
- Genre: Role-playing
- Mode: Single-player

Ore no Shikabane o Koete Yuke (Note: Japanese: 俺の屍を越えてゆけ; lit. Tread Beyond My Corpse and Carry On), commonly abbreviated to Oreshika, is a 1999 role-playing video game developed by Alfa System and MARS Corporation and published by Sony Computer Entertainment for the PlayStation. A remake for the PlayStation Portable was released in 2011. The story follows a family cursed by the oni lord Shutendoji to have short lives and never have children with mortals. Aided by friendly gods who can help them produce heirs, the family goes on a generations-long quest to defeat Shutendoji. Gameplay combines role-playing mechanics and a turn-based battle system with continuing the family tree through pairings with different gods.

Designer Shoji Masuda of MARS Corporation created the original concept, inspired by the idea of a story covering multiple generations. The game began production in 1996. Other staff included illustrator Makoto Sajima, and composer Ryōko Kihara. Both the original and the remake saw strong sales, and met with praise from Japanese journalists for the unique gameplay design. Ore no Shikabane o Koete Yuke saw no Western release due to its focus on Japanese culture. A sequel for the PlayStation Vita, Oreshika: Tainted Bloodlines, was released in 2014 in Japan and 2015 worldwide.

== Gameplay ==
A battle in Ore no Shikabane o Koete Yuke (PSP remake)

Ore no Shikabane o Koete Yuke is a role-playing video game in which players take on the role of a family in the Heian period in and around the city of Kyoto. The gameplay is focused around the player continuing the family tree; the family is cursed for its members to live only two in-game years, so players must find gods to pair with living members of the family in order to sire the next generation. The god chosen by the player dictates elements of the next generation's appearance, along with their player statistics. During the game, the player party goes into labyrinths around Kyoto, dungeons where they fight enemies to gain strength or progress the narrative. Battles start when making contact with an enemy, entering a dedicated arena; depending what direction an enemy is attacked, the player can gain an advantage.

Combat is turn-based, with the player selecting actions including attacking, defending, and using skills. Combat ends when either side is defeated, with the enemy being defeatable by either wiping them out or killing the group's leader. Loot is dictated through a randomized slot machine at the start of combat. After winning, the party is rewarded with two types of experience points; "war victory points" increase a character's statistics, while "dedication points" allow the family to interact with a wider range of progressively powerful gods to continue the family line. Playable characters also have a character class system, with their job decided by players when they are born, with different weapons impacting their skills and attack range.

== Synopsis ==
Married warriors Orin and Genta storm Shutenkaku Castle to defeat the oni lord Shutendoji, who threatens Kyoto and has taken their children hostage. Shutendoji kills Genta and their captured elder daughter, but Orin offers herself to Shutendoji if their surviving child is spared. Shutendoji agrees, but places twin curses on the child in secret; the child can only live two years, and can never have children with a mortal. Concerned at Shutendoji's actions, the gods led by Hiruko Taishoten bless the child, giving them the ability to immediately reach adulthood and permission to have children with gods. With these gifts, the family sets out to fight Shutendoji, who is also cursing earthbound gods across Japan. To aid the family, Hiruko joins them in human form as an aide, and a spirit called Kitsuto acts as a self-proclaimed divine messenger.

The family undermine Shutendoji's influence across Japan, then successfully assault Shutenkaku Castle and defeat Shutendoji. Shutendoji is revealed to be the cursed physical form of Kitsuto, Hiruko's twin brother born from a union between a human and a goddess. Harbouring resentment against humans for his mortal family's deaths and the gods who imprisoned him as Shutendoji to control an earlier rampage, he enacted his plans to free himself and torment the family of Orin, revealed to be his aunt in human form. The family pursues Kitsuto, who has been using the captured Orin's power to birth his demon army and control the local gods. During their fight Kitsuto merges with Orin, forcing the family to kill them both. Orin regains her divine form, and takes Kitsuto−reborn as a baby−to heaven to raise him as one of the gods. This action lifts the family's curse.

== Development ==
The concept for Ore no Shikabane o Koete Yuke was created by designer Shoji Masuda. He first got the idea of a story following multiple short-lived generations after the birth of his second child in 1995. Production began in 1996 in parallel with several other projects. The game was co-developed by Alfa System and Masuda's MARS Corporation. Contrail, a support division of publisher Sony Computer Entertainment helped produce the title. MARS had collaborated with Alfa System on a number of game projects including Linda Cube; both companies jointly operated a blog website until 2018. Masuda attributed the unusual game premise being greenlit to the optimistic atmosphere in Japanese companies at the time, which were experiencing an economic boom.

Masuda drew inspiration from two simulation video games available at the time; Derby Stallion which focuses on breeding successive racehorse generations, and the baseball series Eikan wa Kimi ni which had the team leader change every three years. He combined these inspirations with role-playing elements to create the game's main systems. The game was developed for the PlayStation, with Masuda choosing an older 2D design for its art and battles over then-dominant 3D models. His reasoning was both to keep the speed of battles high, and to emulate traditional Japanese painting. Commenting in 2011 on its similarity to later "social" titles, Masuda said the game was aimed at adults only able to play short sessions.

The scenario was the last part of the game to be finalized. The character Kitsuto was originally female, but at the request of a senior wanting the game to appeal to female gamers, he was changed to a handsome boy. As with many of Masuda's other games, the content and theme focuses on death, though he called this commonality a coincidence. The Heian setting was chosen over other periods due to the number of folklore and mythology set within that era, and being a time of historical transition in history tying into the theme of generational change. The dungeon areas were all based on pre-existing locations in Japan, such as the Lake Biwa Canal, the Ōeyama Mountains, and various temples across Honshu. Many of the gods' names were either explicit references to pre-existing Japanese deities, such as Hiruko being based on Ebisu, or used word play based on their in-game roles and stories. The characters were designed by Makoto Sajima, an artist who had done work on video games and light novel illustration. When choosing an illustrator, Masuda wanted an artist that could appeal to both manga and anime fans, and the general public. The anime cutscenes were created by Studio Sign.

=== Music ===
The music was composed by Ryōko Kihara, who had previously worked in the anime and commercial industry, and composed the score for Linda Cubed. Masuda asked Kihara on board the project after going to a concert featuring her music during the game's planning stage. He positively described her theme as "rooted in daily life" and in line with the game's focus on families. Kihara wanted her music to be a "standard" that would never grow old for players. The music was arranged by Kazuhiko Toyama, while the main theme "Hana" was performed by Gokigen Band. Masuda heard "Hana" being performed at a concert by Kihara early in his planning of the game, and immediately asked for its use. He further stated the game's overall tone and theme was inspired by the song, and wrote the lyrics to be simple yet "powerful" in meaning. A soundtrack album for the game was published by Sony on July 23, 1999.

== Release ==
Ore no Shikabane o Koete Yuke was released on June 17, 1999. Masuda said the title came up during a conversation with manga author Hiroshi Izawa; Masuda was brainstorming ideas with Izawa, and they came up with the title based on the game's premise. The title is often abbreviated to "Oreshika", with some Western journalists and fans also using this title. The full title is translated as "Tread Beyond My Corpse and Carry On". The game cover and manual notably featured two children, Ichimaru Kurashina and Miki Kurai. They were found and brought in to pose for the cover by Kurashina's father, an art designer whom Masuda met by chance. The game was released as a PlayStation Classic on Japan's PlayStation Network on February 22, 2007.

=== Remake ===
A remake of Ore no Shikabane o Koete Yuke was confirmed at a music concert in March 2011, with a press release containing its platform, information on its content and planned release window. The remake, also developed by Alfa System, was released on November 10, 2011, for PlayStation Portable. The gameplay changes include status menus for monitoring the family and allied gods, "techniques" for use in battle, an ad-hoc multiplayer element which allows players to trade their party members for bonuses, and a post-game challenge mode dubbed "Ura Kyoto". Alongside a standard edition, a limited special edition was released which included two new gods also included in first print copies of the standard edition, a soundtrack disc, a booklet featuring behind-the-scenes details, and themed PSP accessories. As part of this special edition, Kurashina and Kurai returned to recreate the original cover art. Free downloadable content was released in 2012 featuring seven further gods for players to interact with. In 2024, the remake was re-released on PlayStation 4 and PlayStation 5 as part of the PlayStation Plus Premium Classic Catalog.

While Masuda and Alfa System were eager to revisit the game, and Masuda attributed Sony agreeing to it to luck and positive changes within the company. He had wanted to create a sequel, but during talks with Sony it was decided to create a remake to both gauge interest in a sequel and revisit mechanics. The multiplayer was restricted to an ad-hoc function due to difficulty maintaining a dedicated server. Most of the work on the remake was described as balancing and adjusting gameplay, as Masuda felt the original was close to ideal. The graphics were redrawn, the aspect ratio expanded from 4:3 to 16:9, the scenario was greatly expanded, the voice overs were re-recorded, and in response to fan requests an epilogue was added to address the original game's abrupt ending. While actors for named characters returned, most of the other characters had new voice actors.

Sajima returned as character designer, and Kihara as composer. Masuda wanted all the original songs to be kept, while Kihara insisted on there being new orchestration. She compared the differences between the two soundtracks to different interpretations of the same music from different orchestras. Kihara also contributed new themes, arranged by Konoskee. A soundtrack album for the remake was released on November 23, 2011, by Team Entertainment.

== Reception ==
Reception

Review score
Publication	Score
Famitsu	28/40 (PS); 34/40 (PSP)

According to Matsuda, the original release only shipped 20,000 copies during its first week. By the end of the year, the game had sold over 137,500 units. Combined with sales of the PlayStation Classic version, the game sold 400,000 copies. Japanese gaming magazine Famitsu felt the game's RPG elements were basic, but that the character growth elements were "unique", citing it as an ambitious title. In a retrospective article on the game Inside Games cited it as a highly memorable title from the late PlayStation lifecycle, highlighting the amount of player freedom and its unusual gameplay mechanics.

During its opening week, the remake reached third place in sales charts, selling over 94,000 units. It sold just over 140,000 units by the end of 2011. In a pre-release preview, 4Gamer.net highlighted its improved visuals and refined gameplay elements compared to the original. Revisiting the game, Famitsu lauded its replay value and the adjustments to game balance compared to the original, feeling that its mechanics had aged well and remained unique.

== Sequel ==
Since its release the title has become a popular favourite in Japan, and Masuda would reference elements of Oreshika in his other work. No version of Ore no Shikabane o Koete Yuke saw an official release outside Japan. During a 2014 interview, Sony studio chief Allan Becker stated that the game was not localized as Sony thought it was "too 'Japanese' to appeal to a western audience." A sequel for the PlayStation Vita was released in 2014 in Japan. It was also released in the West in 2015 under the title Oreshika: Tainted Bloodlines.
