= Akiba's Trip =

- Cover art from the first game
- Developer(s): Acquire
- Publisher(s): Acquire
- Platform(s): PlayStation Portable, PlayStation Vita, PlayStation 3, PlayStation 4, Microsoft Windows, iOS, Android, Nintendo Switch
- First release: Akiba's Trip; May 19, 2011
- Latest release: Akiba's Beat; December 15, 2016

Akiba's Trip is a Japanese video game franchise by developer Acquire. The franchise consists of five games and an anime television series adaptation by Gonzo that aired between January 4, 2017 and March 29, 2017.

== Video games ==
=== Akiba's Trip ===
The original Akiba's Trip game was released on PlayStation Portable in Japan by Acquire on May 19, 2011. An updated version, titled Akiba's Trip Plus, was released for PSP on June 14, 2012. A PlayStation 4, Nintendo Switch and Microsoft Windows remake was released on July 20, 2021 in the U.S. and Europe, titled Akiba's Trip: Hellbound & Debriefed.

=== Akiba's Trip for GREE ===
The second release in the franchise, Akiba's Trip for GREE was a Japan-only free-to-play smartphone game using the GREE platform. It focused on acquiring maid cafés through a touchscreen quick time event version of the original's combat engine. The game launched on January 20, 2012 for Android and on June 29, 2012 for iOS. Service was discontinued and the game was made unavailable on November 26, 2012.

=== Akiba's Trip: Undead & Undressed ===
Acquire released Akiba's Trip 2 on PlayStation 3 and PlayStation Vita in Japan on November 7, 2013, and on PlayStation 4 on July 3, 2014. XSEED Games released the game in North America under the title Akiba's Trip: Undead & Undressed. They released the game on PS3 and PSVita on August 12, 2014, on PS4 on November 25, 2014, and on PC on May 26, 2015. Additionally, NIS America released the game in Europe.

=== Akiba's Trip Festa! ===
Akiba's Trip Festa! was released for PC and Android in November 30, 2016.

=== Akiba's Beat ===
Akiba's Beat, the first action RPG game in the franchise, was originally scheduled for a fall 2016 release on PS4 and PS Vita, but was later delayed to December 15, 2016 on PS4 and March 16, 2017 on PS Vita. The game is directed by Kōta Takano, while ClariS is performing the theme song, "again". XSEED Games released the game in North America on May 16, 2017. It was also released in Europe by PQube on May 19, 2017.
