= LocoRoco 2 =

2008 video game

- Developer: Japan Studio
- Publisher: Sony Computer Entertainment
- Director: Hiroya Matsugami
- Designer: Tsutomu Kouno
- Artist: Keigo Tsuchiya
- Composers: Nobuyuki Shimizu; Kemmei Adachi
- Platforms: PlayStation Portable, PlayStation 4
- Release: PlayStation Portable: EU: November 21, 2008; AU: November 27, 2008; JP: December 4, 2008; NA: February 10, 2009; PlayStation 4: WW: December 9, 2017; JP: December 14, 2017
- Genres: Platform, puzzle
- Modes: Single-player, multiplayer

LocoRoco 2 is a platform video game developed and published by Sony Computer Entertainment for the PlayStation Portable. It is the sequel to LocoRoco and the third game in the series after LocoRoco Cocoreccho!. It was released in Japan and PAL regions in 2008 and North America in 2009. A remastered version was released on December 9, 2017 for the PlayStation 4.

== Plot ==
Having successfully defeated the Moja Corps, the LocoRoco settled back into their peaceful life. However, Bon Mucho, the Moja Boss, is not willing to accept defeat, so he devises a terrible song that can suck the life force out of living things, as a new attack on the LocoRoco. Armed with this fearsome song, the Moja boarded their meteorite and set off once more on a mission to conquer the LocoRoco planet. Back there, the LocoRoco finds the new MuiMui house, but right after, the meteor comes crashing down onto a Nyokki, and the Mojas start attacking again (sucking the life force out of living things, and as usual, eating LocoRoco). The LocoRoco then set off on an even more epic journey to restore the life force into living things and defeat the Moja Corps.

== Gameplay ==
Like the original LocoRoco game, the player controls are the same, as they once again play as the planet. The shoulder buttons are used to tilt the world to maneuver the LocoRoco, and pressing both of the buttons simultaneously causes the LocoRoco to jump. The single large LocoRoco can be separated by pressing the circle button or through specific points on the level, while individual LocoRoco can merge back into a single being by holding down the circle button.

=== New features ===
LocoRoco 2 has many new features added from its previous game, including the ability to swim underwater, squeeze through crevices, and gain many new abilities. Noticeable new characters in the game include Bonmucho's mother Majolinè, the BuiBui (Former MuiMui who were kissed by Majolinè, making them evil and sporting a red color to distinguish themselves from the MuiMui), a new purple LocoRoco named Viole, and an old lady named Galanmar.

=== Locations ===
The location 'backgrounds' are seen in the first LocoRoco, except for the BuiBui Fort and the MuiMui Home. These include The flower garden (Franzea), the big mountain (Perculoka), the ice mountain (Shamplin), the tropical island (Tropuca), the land of stars (Chapo-Wahr), the dark, spooky land (Dolangomeri), the sunny/rhythmic land, (CaloCaro), the jungle/ancient ruins (Jaojab), the large tree (Yamboona Tree), and the fungus-forest (Kelapton).

== Reception ==
LocoRoco 2 received "generally favorable" reviews, according to review aggregator Metacritic. During the 13th Annual Interactive Achievement Awards, the Academy of Interactive Arts & Sciences nominated LocoRoco 2 for "Outstanding Achievement in Portable Game Design".

Reception

Aggregate score
Aggregator	Score
Metacritic	PSP: 85/100; PS4: 79/100

Review scores
Publication	Score
Destructoid	8.5/10
IGN	9.1/10
Push Square	8/10
VideoGamer.com	9/10
