= Harvest Moon: Hero of Leaf Valley =

2009 video game

- Developers: Marvelous Entertainment; Hyde
- Publishers: JP: Marvelous Entertainment; NA: Natsume Inc.; PAL: Rising Star Games
- Director: Kenichi Yanagihara
- Producers: Hikaru Nakano; Shinji Motoki (Assistant); Yasuhiro Wada (Chief)
- Designers: Norihide Kanemura; Satoshi Hirano; Mitsuya Saito
- Programmer: Takumi Kobayashi
- Artist: Igusa Matsuyama
- Writers: Ryoto Hanawa; Kazuya Yamada; Sumiyuki Ashida; Mamiko Miyamoto
- Series: Story of Seasons
- Platform: PlayStation Portable
- Release: JP: March 19, 2009; NA: April 26, 2010; AU: November 3, 2010; EU: November 12, 2010
- Genre: Construction and management simulation
- Mode: Single-player

Harvest Moon: Hero of Leaf Valley, known in Japan as Bokujō Monogatari: Sugar Mura to Minna no Negai (牧場物語シュガー村と皆の願い, Bokujō Monogatari: Shugā Mura to Minna no Negai; lit. "Ranch Story: Sugar Village and Everyone's Wish"), is a video game in the farm simulation series Harvest Moon for PlayStation Portable, developed by Marvelous Interactive Inc. and published by Natsume Inc. in the U.S. It was released on March 19, 2009 in Japan and on April 26, 2010 in North America.

The game follows along the same lines as the rest of the Story of Seasons series, in which the player takes on the role of a farmer whose only goal in the game is to make a profit from the farm he runs including producing crops and raising livestock. The game is an enhanced remake of Harvest Moon: Save the Homeland, with many major changes.

== Story ==
The player (who is by default named Toy) travels to Leaf Valley to pick up his grandfather's things after hearing that he has died. He learns that in two years, the village will be turned into an amusement park by a company called Funland, and encounters three Harvest Sprites named Nic, Nak, and Flak and the Harvest Goddess, who ask him to stay on the farm and help them. The player then decides to take over his grandfather's farm and work hard to turn the village around. The player also meets Alice, Funland's CEO, and her henchmen, Charles and Renton, who reveal that they have the town's deed. He then makes it his goal to stop Funland's plans and increase the town's popularity to avert its destruction, all while having to deal with Alice's robotic creations. By choosing different paths, you can find up to 16 ways to save the village.

If the player is successful in saving the village before the end of the second year, Alice will give back the deed and will either leave or stay depending on the player's actions. The player will then be faced with a second challenge: earning the required amount of money before the end of the third year to convince his father (who doesn't think he can handle the farm by himself) to allow him to stay in the village.

== Reception ==
Reception

Aggregate score
Aggregator	Score
Metacritic	74/100

Review scores
Publication	Score
Famitsu	27/40
IGN	7.5/10
PlayStation: The Official Magazine	3.5/5
RPGamer	3.5/5
RPGFan	78%

The game received "mixed or average" reviews according to the review aggregation website Metacritic. IGN said "the controls can be frustrating at times" but that "I had a hard time putting down Harvest Moon: Hero of Leaf Valley." In Japan, Famitsu gave it a score of one six and three sevens for a total of 27 out of 40.
