= Bishi Bashi =

Video game series

- Cover art for Bishi Bashi Special
- Developer: Konami
- Publisher: Konami
- Platforms: PlayStation, Windows, mobile devices, Arcade
- First release: Bishi Bashi Champ; 1996
- Latest release: Bishi Bashi Channel; 2018

Bishi Bashi (ビシバシ, Bishi Bashi) is a series of video games by Konami for arcades, mobile phones, PlayStation and Windows. All games in the series comprise playing through a wide variety of competitive minigames against other players. The arcade games support 1 to 6 players and the PlayStation game allows 1 to 8 players; the game will provide computer opponents if there are not enough players.

== Arcade games ==
The arcade games released so far include:

- Bishi Bashi Championship Mini Game Senshuken, or Bishi Bashi Champ in 1996
- Super Bishi Bashi Champ and Handle Champ (also known as Steering Champ) in 1998
- Hyper Bishi Bashi Champ, Gachaga Champ and Step Champ in 1999
- Anime Champ in 2000
- Salaryman Champ in 2001
- Great Bishi Bashi Champ in 2002
- Bishi Bashi Champ Online in 2005
- The★BishiBashi in 2009
- BishiBashi Channel in 2018

The arcade game controls are very simple; each player is given a set of three large buttons: red, green and blue, positioned left, centre and right respectively. Each mini-game explains its controls before play commences. Some titles of the series, however, make use of a steering wheel (Handle Champ), two joysticks (Gachaga Champ), or a dance pad (Step Champ) for the purpose of controls instead of the three buttons.

Bishi Bashi Champ Online was the first game in the series to feature e-Amusement Pass support. The★BishiBashi adds a small yellow button (start button), used in most mini-games to finish the mini-game before time runs out or to score additional points. BishiBashi Channel allows for up to four players to play at a time and replaces the usual green button with a larger one that can be rotated (though it can still be tapped), with some mini-games requiring players to rotate this button. The new rotating buttons, as well as the cabinet's stand BishiBashi Channel offers originate from MÚSECA cabinets, another video game developed by Konami and developed for arcades, though not many remain today as a result of many MÚSECA cabinets being converted to BishiBashi Channel cabinets following the game's discontinuation.

== PlayStation games ==
Some of the minigames from the arcade games have been ported to the Sony PlayStation and released under the name Bishi Bashi Special (ビシバシスペシャル). Salaryman Champ has also been ported to the same console.

- Bishi Bashi Special was released in 1998 in Japan.
  - Includes the minigames from Bishi Bashi Champ, Super Bishi Bashi Champ and Handle Champ.
- Bishi Bashi Special 2 was released in 1999 in Japan.
  - Includes the minigames from Hyper Bishi Bashi Champ and Gachaga Champ.
- A European edition titled Bishi Bashi Special was released in 2000 and compiles Bishi Bashi Special 1 and 2 on one disc, retitled Super Bishi Bashi and Hyper Bishi Bashi.
- Bishi Bashi Special 3 was released in 2000 in Japan only.
  - Includes the minigames from Step Champ. Unlike the arcade game, the ported minigames do not always use the red, green and blue buttons of the PlayStation joypad; "button bashing" minigames allow the player to use the analog sticks or the shoulder buttons as well as the regular buttons.
- Salaryman Champ: Tatakau Salaryman was released in 2001 in Japan only (developed and released by Success).

== Mobile phone games ==
- Bishi Bashi Champ in 2001
- Shout! Shaberin Champ Mobile in 2007
- Intuition! Bishi Bashi Champ Mobile in 2007
- The Bishi Bashi! e-AMUSEMENT in 2009
- Min'na de bishibashi in 2014
