= Vandal Hearts II =

1999 video game

- Developer: Konami Computer Entertainment Nagoya
- Publisher: Konami
- Producer: Tōru Hagihara
- Designer: Takashi Takeda
- Artist: Shinobu Tanno
- Composer: Hiroshi Tamawari
- Platform: PlayStation
- Release: JP: July 8, 1999; NA: December 1, 1999; PAL: June 30, 2000
- Genre: Tactical role-playing
- Mode: Single-player

Vandal Hearts II (Note: Japanese: ヴァンダルハーツII 〜天上の門〜, Hepburn: Vandaru Hātsu II 〜Tenjō no Mon〜; lit. "Vandal Hearts II: Heavenly Gate") is a 1999 tactical role-playing game developed by Konami Computer Entertainment Nagoya and published by Konami for the PlayStation. It is the sequel to the 1996 title, Vandal Hearts.

== Gameplay ==
Vandal Hearts II uses a three-map layout of an overworld map, town map and a battle map. The overworld features a basic map of the country with dots to mark the location of points of interest. Players travel over the overworld map by clicking on the points of interest and moving towards the location they have chosen.

The dots on the overworld map have been divided into two sections, battle maps and town maps with all but a select few maps being re-visitable. Some locations open up only to advance the story.

Town maps are a screenshot of the town with locations of interest selected from the menu on the right of the screen, featuring the local tavern, shops and little else except where the story determines otherwise.

Vandal Hearts II boasts over 120 different weapon and armour combinations and the game features non-set classes unlike many other RPGs. Warriors can be changed to Healers without any penalties. This is achieved through the armour and weapon systems, skills must be learned through equipping weapons and earning enough points to master them, while armour determines the characters hit points and magic points as well as movement rates and defence.

Combat in Vandal Hearts II is done using a new Dual-Turn System, stated as being an Active Time Battle system for tactical RPGs. The dual-turn system permits both the player and the computer to move one unit on the battlemap simultaneously.

== Plot ==
Vandal Hearts II takes place in the country of Natra and follows the story of Joshua from childhood until adulthood, focusing his progress through the civil war that tears his home country apart. The early stages of the game introduce the hero and his childhood companions and acts as a prologue to future events in the hero's adult life.

The adult stages of the game shows the country of Natra immersed in a civil war with both warring factions having foreign backers. Joshua's renegade band of outlaws gets drawn into a plot to create a third faction to end the war and restore peace. The game has a branching storyline that can be altered by the player's dialogue choices and lead to multiple endings.

Compared to the original game which had multiple, although very similar, endings depending on how well the player performed and whether or not they completed the trials of Toroah, Vandal Hearts II has four distinctly different endings and three similar endings which are determined by three choices that the player must make along the story.

=== Story ===
Childhood Chapters

10 years ago, King Zekras left the Kingdom of Natra to his son Prince Julius. However, the younger Prince Lagore raised an army to contest the throne, causing his brother to flee the country. While Lagore proved to be a fair king, he was slowly poisoned by Queen Mother Agatha and her lover Cardinal Ladorak. Agatha placed her young son Franz as heir, while Ladorak was promoted to the rank of Premier. Now, Ladorak is oppressing the peasantry with his brutal secret police, the Blood Knights.

The small Northern Natra village of Polata is home to Joshua and Rosaly, the adoptive children of the mayor. They are frequently joined by other commoners Clive, son of a tavern owner, and Yuri a gifted prodigy. Another friend is the low ranking noble Adele, daughter of the local Governor Graud Byron. One day, Rosaly is saved by a wandering swordsman before he collapses from unknown injuries. After resting for a short time, the swordsman publicly fights against the corrupt tax collectors working for Graud. It is revealed that the swordsman is Prince Nicola, the lost son of Julius. Nicola had come to the region to gain support from Kossimo Byron, only to learn that Kossimo retired and gave the position to his son-in-law Graud.

Joshua personally leads Nicola to a meeting with Kossimo, but the older Byron refuses to start a rebellion, even if it would depose Agatha. Desperate, Nicola sides with Ladorak and the Blood Knights to fight the Queen Mother. Joshua is appalled at Nicola and plans to flee the land with Adele. However, he discovers that one of Graud’s servants, Godard the Diviner, has been manipulating the situation. Godard uses dark magic to turn Kossimo into a deranged murderer and Joshua is forced to kill him. Adele witnesses the aftermath of the assault and orders the Blood Knights to arrest Joshua. The young boy dives from a window and escapes into the night. Graud and Godard are pleased to discover from Nicola’s documents that Adele can regain the Byron’s powerful status and send her off to the capitol.

Adulthood Chapters

Nicola succeeds in routing Agatha from the Eastern Capitol Yuggor, but she flees to Gardeau in West Natra. During the confusion, Franz goes missing. Agatha instead places the younger Princess Minea as incumbent regent and marries her to Prince Gregor of the Zora-Archeo Twin Empire; Agatha herself being an Archeo royal. Since disappearing, Joshua has become a mercenary with new allies Vlad and Pike. They raid an East Natra train and find the West Natra prisoners Baron Pratau and his guard Lira. Pratau is ultimately loyal to Franz, knowing that Agatha conspired to abandon her son in favor of Gregor. Pratau hires Joshua, Vlad, and Pike into his White Dragons brigade. They save Franz from an East Natra labor camp, but the prince has been mentally broken, coming to life only when commanded.

The White Dragons meet with Yuri, who has become a church emissary in charge of investigating Ladorak. Their journey leads them to Polata, which was decimated at the start of the war. It is revealed that Godard is leader of the fanatical Kudur Cult, is in the process of converting Graud, and has placed Adele as their figurehead. Yuri and Franz are separated from the rest of the group and Godard begins to sow doubt about the Nirvath religion in Yuri’s mind. Meanwhile, Joshua finds out that Clive and Rosaly are married, but have fallen on hard times. Additionally, Nicola has become a frequent drunken patron of Clive's, shirking away his responsibilities as East Natra's leader. Pratau gains an ally in Duke Kleuth of East Natra, and together they establish Central Natra with Franz as rightful heir.

Godard approaches Ladorak, revealing that Adele is Zekras’ illegitimate third child from a tryst with Lady Byron. Viewing Nicola has lost his purpose, the Blood Knights leave him for dead and establish Adele as the new head of East Natra. While attacking West Natra, the White Dragons discover how far the Kudur Cult’s experiments have twisted the people, turning them into crazed killers like Kossimo. Upon returning to Central Natra, Joshua is shocked to find Kleuth and the Blood Knights entranced while Ladorak and Yuri are willing participants of the Kudur Cult. Central and East Natra unite with the marriage of Franz and Adele.

Knowing the dangers of the Kudur Cult, the White Dragons make plans to take out Godard. Clive brings the party to Nicola, who survived his near fatal assault thanks to a paranoid Ladorak. The new alliance is able to slay Godard (who has already killed Ladorak for his betrayal), but Yuri escapes with the remains of the cult. Joshua and Pratau then turn their attention back towards finishing off West Natra. The Twin Empire's planned conquest of Natra turns out to be a ruse, and Archeo surprise attacks Zora, forcing a retreat. Learning of the cruel fate of Franz, Minea and Gregor kill Agatha, but the princess dies in the process. The White Dragons arrive in the Gardeau throne room in time to find Agatha’s loyalists executing Gregor, causing West Natra to collapse.

During all of this, Godard’s soul possesses Franz and reveals to Adele his past. He was once a Nirvath cardinal who was excommunicated for upholding moral values over the church’s strict rules. Hearing that everyday people were just as zealous as the church, Godard completely lost faith in Nirvath and made plans to eradicate the world with the ancient Life Tree. The White Dragons chase after Yuri and Adele, who are heading to Natra Palace with Nicola and others as hostages. Yuri reveals that he has uncovered that Saint Nirvath used the power of Vandal Hearts to cause an apocalypse, but hid all evidence when founding the church. Depending on if a side-quest to acquire the Vandal Hearts sword was completed, Yuri may either be talked down with knowledge that Vandal Hearts was a last resort to stop the rampaging Life Tree, or killed in battle. Likewise, depending on actions throughout the game Adele may either commit suicide, rejoin with Godard, or peacefully reconcile with Joshua.

The White Dragons head to Nirvadia, home of the Nirvath church, to destroy the Life Tree and put down Godard (along with Adele if she remained faithful). During the final battle, Franz’s true self resurfaces and is able to keep Godard under control, allowing Joshua to make the killing blow. The Nirvath cathedral is destroyed and new wars begin to erupt around the world. In the near future, leaders like Pratau and Nicola are able to establish some stability. The story then jumps a number of years to show the fate of Joshua, depending on multiple player choices. This can include being the Premier and lover to Queen Adele, a wandering adventurer, a simple mayor, or a scheming tyrant. Those that acquired all available weapons will unlock a hidden scene of Joshua returning the Vandal Hearts sword to its resting place, where he encounters a Vandalier warrior implied to be Ash from the first game.

== Reception ==
Reception

Aggregate score
Aggregator	Score
GameRankings	77%

Review scores
Publication	Score
AllGame	4/5
Electronic Gaming Monthly	7.875/10 (Note: In Electronic Gaming Monthly's review of the game, one critic gave it a score of 8.5/10, another gave it 7/10, and the rest gave it each a score of 8/10.)
Famitsu	32/40
Game Informer	7.75/10
GameFan	70% (Note: Three critics of GameFan gave the game each a score of 70, 68, and 73.)
GameSpot	7/10
IGN	7.4/10
Next Generation	3/5
Official U.S. PlayStation Magazine	3.5/5
RPGFan	76%

The game received favorable reviews according to the review aggregation website GameRankings. Francesca Reyes of NextGen said, "With its steep leaning curve, VH2 [sic] may not be ideal for novices, but because it has a strong story and clever battle features, it proves to be a great challenge for veterans." In Japan, Famitsu gave it a score of 32 out of 40.

The game was considered by Gaming Intelligence Agency to be vastly superior to its predecessor.

Some criticism of Vandal Hearts II had to do with the storyline. IGN considered the story lackluster enough to not even "remember it", and GameSpot agreed, considering the storyline to be one that most people "won't care to follow". Gaming Intelligence Agency on the other hand believed that the game lacked the variety of its predecessor, with standard "kill everything" missions. Other criticisms included the game's general lack of explanation towards the more complicated systems, and a translation that is described by RPGFan as "adequate but unimpressive".

The controls and battle system were also criticized for being stiff and laborious and the story as long and as twisting as it was linear. GamePro said that the game "won't draw you in with its average story, nor will it dazzle you with its average graphics – but it may amaze you with its totally addicting strategy-based battles. If you have lots of free time, or you're hunkering for brain-teasing combat, your next move should be to buy Vandal-Hearts II." (Note: GamePro gave the game 3/5 for graphics, 2/5 for sound, 5/5 for control, and 4.5/5 for fun factor.)
