= Ridge Racer (2004 video game) =

Racing video game

- North American version cover art featuring Soldat Raggio (foreground) and Assoluto Fatalita (background)
- Developer: Namco
- Publishers: JP: Namco; NA: Namco Hometek; EU: Sony Computer Entertainment
- Director: Masaya Kobayashi
- Producer: Isao Nakamura
- Designer: Hisashi Kawamura
- Composer: Hiroshi Okubo
- Series: Ridge Racer
- Platform: PlayStation Portable
- Release: JP: 12 December 2004; NA: 24 March 2005; PAL: 1 September 2005
- Genre: Racing
- Modes: Single-player, multiplayer

Ridge Racer, released in Japan as Ridge Racers (Note: Japanese: リッジレーサーズ, Hepburn: Rijji Rēsāzu) is a 2004 racing video game developed and published by Namco for the PlayStation Portable. An installment in the Ridge Racer series, it was released as a global launch title for the system, on 12 December 2004 in Japan and overseas in 2005. Ridge Racer has been described as a 'compilation' of the series, featuring tracks, cars and remixed soundtrack from previous titles of the 1990s. Gameplay-wise, it marked the change from the "classic" style last seen in Ridge Racer V to the new drifting mechanic and nitrous boost that the series would incorporate from there on, including on Ridge Racer 6 and Ridge Racer 7.

Ridge Racer was critically acclaimed, praised for its visuals, gameplay and soundtrack; it was notable at the time for providing home console-like graphics at a smooth 60 fps framerate on a mobile gaming system, harnessing the PSP's graphical abilities. An updated version with more tracks and modes was released for the PSP in 2006 titled Ridge Racer 2; seven years after Ridge Racer on PSP came Ridge Racer on PlayStation Vita.

== Gameplay ==
Gameplay screenshot

The core aspect of the entire Ridge Racer series is drift racing, that is traditional lap racing against opponents with the added twist of intentionally oversteering and sliding the car through sharp corners and turns, known as "drifting", which earns the player several bonuses during a race.

There are a total of 24 courses in the game. Game modes are World Tour, Single race, Time Trial, and Wireless Battle, which supports up to 8 player multiplayer over the PSP's ad hoc Wi-Fi network capability. World Tour consists of 2 to 6 races per tour, representing a specific world of Ridge Racer.

Notable in the game is the "nitrous boost" system. The player has a Nitrous Gauge made up of three nitrous tanks, which at the start of a race are either completely depleted or only partially full. As the player drifts through the corners (especially at very high slip angles) during the race, their nitrous gauge fills up. When the player fills up one of the three nitrous tanks, it can be activated to achieve a temporary speed boost. The nitrous tanks cannot be recharged while any tank is in use though, but the residual speed increase when the nitrous boost expires can be used just before entering corners to recharge the player's nitrous tanks at a faster rate than normal.

The game also features a full motion video opening, that shows series mascot Reiko Nagase, marking her return following her absence from Ridge Racer V. Available in the game is a fully playable version of the 1980 Namco arcade game Rally-X, which appears when the game initially loads up.

== Development ==
The game was announced under the title New Ridge Racer at E3 2004. An updated demo build was playable at the Tokyo Games Show later that year. Sony confirmed on November 5, 2004 that Ridge Racers would be a launch title. The title, with the additional 'S' at the end to make it a plural, was made to represent the game as a unified gathering of all the previous Ridge Racer games. Development took approximately 9 months. The director, Kenya Kobayashi, said their goals were to "hit the sweet spot for fans" and "make the most of the hardware specifications".

=== Music ===
Hiroshi Okubo, who composed for previous Ridge Racer entries and sound directed R4: Ridge Racer Type 4, served as the game's sound director. In relation to the idea of Ridge Racers being a unified gathering of content from previous games, Okubo assembled a large team of composers, many of whom had composed for previous Ridge Racer games. The team included in-house composers such as Tetsukazu Nakanishi and Yuu Miyake, as well as composers who had since left Namco such as Shinji Hosoe, Nobuyoshi Sano, and Kohta Takahashi. The game's music is split into five discs: Red and Blue Disc both consist of new tracks, Remix Disc consists of remixed music from previous Ridge Racer games, and Classic Disc 1 and 2 features selections of tracks from previous games.

A 2 CD soundtrack was published by Namco and distributed by King Records on April 27, 2005. Its production was delayed due to the team having to review rights and contracts, as well as prioritizing the game's launch. Some tracks that were shortened for their in-game versions appear in full length. The version of "Drive U 2 Dancing Remix" here notably includes vocals; Ayako Saso had submitted both vocal and instrumental versions as options during development.

== Reception ==
Reception

Aggregate score
Aggregator	Score
Metacritic	88/100

Review scores
Publication	Score
Edge	8/10
Electronic Gaming Monthly	8.83/10
Eurogamer	9/10
Famitsu	34/40
Game Informer	7.5/10
GamePro	4.5/5
GameRevolution	B
GameSpot	8.3/10
GameSpy	5/5
GameZone	8.6/10
IGN	9.1/10
Official U.S. PlayStation Magazine	4.5/5
Pocket Gamer	4/5
The Sydney Morning Herald	4.5/5
The Times	4/5

Ridge Racer received "generally favorable reviews" according to the review aggregation website Metacritic. Its graphical ability and visuals were incredible on a portable device in 2004, and it was further praised for its gameplay, soundtrack (which also consisted of remixed tracks from older Ridge Racer titles) and multiplayer option. PALGN praised the game's graphics and the gameplay and considered the best Ridge Racer title for PSP.

In retrospect, Adam Ismail of Kotaku Australia wrote about the game: "It's truly difficult to convey how staggering this game was to behold on a PSP. Seemingly overnight, we went from sprite-scalers and almost-but-not-quite 3D racing games on the Game Boy Advance to a 60 frames-per-second experience that could compete with anything on a home console."

In Japan, Famitsu gave it a score of two eights and two nines for a total of 34 out of 40.

It was re-released in 2005/2006 as a platinum title.
