= Ganbare Goemon: Uchū Kaizoku Akogingu =

1996 video game

- Developer: Konami
- Publisher: Konami
- Director: Haruki Kyuda
- Producers: Masaki Yoneoka; Yutaka Haruki; Kazumi Kitaue
- Composers: Akira Yamaoka; Michiru Yamane; Takayuki Fujii; Motoaki Furukawa; Tappi Iwase; Kosuke Soeda; Hiroshi Tamawari; Shoichiro Hirata
- Series: Ganbare Goemon
- Platform: PlayStation
- Release: JP: March 22, 1996
- Genre: Action-adventure
- Mode: Single-player

Ganbare Goemon: Uchū Kaizoku Akogingu (がんばれゴエモン〜宇宙海賊アコギング〜) is an action-adventure video game developed and published by Konami for the PlayStation, which was released in Japan in March 1996. The game is the eleventh mainline installment of the Ganbare Goemon series.

== Story ==
One night, Goemon awakens from his sleep to some huge noise, so he and Ebisumaru decide to go and investigate. The pair find out that it is an alien, and that Edo is being invaded.

== Development and gameplay ==
Gameplay is rather similar to Ganbare Goemon 3, as there is a main map in a top-down perspective, which leads to various 2D side-scrolling levels. Being that it is the first Ganbare Goemon title released for the PlayStation, it experimented with graphics such as showing inward depth during the overhead map portions.

The soundtrack contains both new tracks and remixes of older tracks from previous entries in the series, which was handled by Akira Yamaoka, Michiru Yamane, Takayuki Fujii, Motoaki Furukawa, Tappi Iwase, "Latino", Hiroshi Tamawari, and Shoichiro Hirata.

== Reception ==
Reception

Review score
Publication	Score
Dengeki PlayStation	(PS) 70/100, 60/100

Dengeki PlayStation reviewed the game in 1996, with two reviewers giving it scores of 70 and 60 out of 100. The reviewers noted that the game retained the traditional atmosphere of earlier Ganbare Goemon titles while introducing some PlayStation-era elements such as polygonal boss battles. However, they also felt that the game did not fully take advantage of the console's capabilities and that its action gameplay was somewhat weak.
