= Oreshika: Tainted Bloodlines =

2014 video game

- Developer: Alfa System (Note: Additional work by Japan Studio and MARS Corporation.)
- Publisher: Sony Computer Entertainment
- Director: Shoji Masuda
- Designer: Shoji Masuda
- Artist: Makoto Sajima
- Writers: Shoji Masuda; Miwa Shoda
- Composer: Konosuke Kihara
- Platform: PlayStation Vita
- Release: JP: July 17, 2014; NA: March 3, 2015; EU/AU: March 4, 2015
- Genre: Role-playing
- Mode: Single-player

Oreshika: Tainted Bloodlines (Note: Japanese: 俺の屍を越えてゆけ2, Hepburn: Ore no Shikabane wo Koete Yuke 2; lit. Tread Beyond My Corpse and Carry On 2) is a 2014 role-playing video game developed by Alfa System and published by Sony Computer Entertainment for the PlayStation Vita. It is the sequel to the 1999 PlayStation game Ore no Shikabane o Koete Yuke which Alfa System previously developed.

== Setting ==
Oreshika: Tainted Bloodlines is set 100 years after its predecessor, with no direct story connections between the two games. The story is based on a cursed bloodline destined to fight against a demon.

== Development ==
The game was first briefly introduced in 2011 in the form of a teaser; further information relating to the game was revealed at the Tokyo Game Show in 2013.

While the game has significant graphical improvements over its predecessor, it maintains its trademark visual style resembling Japanese traditional-style artwork. The move towards a three-dimensional graphical interface was as a result of popular request from fans, who were interested in seeing a hereditary resemblance found between the characters, according to director Shoji Masuda. Feedback from fans of the game played an important role in game development, with Sony gathering opinions via questionnaires from social media networks including Twitter, mixi and 2channel. The writing of the game's script is more than double that of the previous game, with a significantly larger variety of scenarios.

The game's animated cut-scenes were handled by Asahi Production.

== Gameplay ==
In-game screenshot demonstrating the unique art style of the game.

Unlike the original 1999 PlayStation game, the sequel has characters fully rendered in 3D. The labyrinth levels are also rendered in 3D, with a fixed camera. The game system is similar to the style of the original game, with basic enemy encounters, and decreased character strength upon running. The game utilises the PlayStation Vita's camera using a face recognition mechanism.

Upon defeating enemies, the player will accumulate points, which will allow them to marry deities and create children with them; these children will have faces inherited from the parents, and can be customly named. Each character can only live for two years, which means that players will need to progress through generations in the family tree when playing. There are eight different job classes to choose from, including swordsmen, archers, spearmen, dancers, naginatamen, breakers, martial artists, and cannoneers.

Character development is based on leveling up through gaining experience and equipping various equipment akin to most role-playing games. Characters are able to develop abilities known as "arts" and "secret techniques", and the party consists of a leader and three other members. Whilst in dungeons, players fight demons and acquire items. Dungeons vary from caves, forests, mansions and temples. There is a "Symbol Encounter" system for initiating battles, similar to recent Japanese RPG games, where a battle advantage can be attained by approaching enemies from the rear. The game progresses as the player takes control over a family faction that spans the nation, and expands the control of the family. The family is managed by the player at a central base in the form of a mansion, whilst nearby towns have various stores that can be utilised.

Reception

Aggregate scores
Aggregator	Score
GameRankings	76%
Metacritic	78/100

Review scores
Publication	Score
Destructoid	8.5/10
Eurogamer	8/10
Famitsu	36/40
GameSpot	8/10
Hardcore Gamer	4/5
PlayStation LifeStyle.net	4.5/10
IGN Spain	8/10
NZGamer.com	8/10

== Media ==
The original game soundtrack was released in Japan on July 23, 2014, containing three CDs which feature 78 individual music tracks.

== Reception ==
Oreshika: Tainted Bloodlines received generally favorable reviews from critics, earning aggregate scores of 76% from GameRankings and 78/100 from Metacritic.

Famitsu gave Oreshika: Tainted Bloodlines a review score of 36/40. Hardcore Gamer gave the game a 4 out of 5, saying "Oreshika: Tainted Bloodlines is a strange, captivating experience unlike any other RPG."

The game sold 93,775 physical retail copies within the first week of release in Japan, representing a 73.64% sell-through of its initial shipment; according to retailers, the primary buyer demographic consisted of existing fans of the earlier 1999 PlayStation game.
