= Vandal Hearts =

1996 video game

- North American box art
- Developer: Konami: PlayStation Konami Computer Entertainment Tokyo Sega Saturn Konami Computer Entertainment Nagoya Windows Konami Computer Games Aoyama System Sacom
- Publisher: Konami
- Artist: Hiroshi Kyomasu
- Writer: Nobuya Nakazato
- Composers: Hiroshi Tamawari; Miki Higashino; Kosuke Soeda; Masahiro Yamauchi
- Platforms: PlayStation, Sega Saturn, Microsoft Windows
- Release: PlayStation: JP: October 25, 1996; NA: March 27, 1997; EU: June 1, 1997; Sega Saturn: JP: November 27, 1997; Microsoft Windows: JP: 1998; KOR: 1998
- Genre: Tactical role-playing
- Mode: Single-player

Vandal Hearts, known in Japan as Vandal Hearts: The Lost Ancient Civilization (ヴァンダルハーツ ～失われた古代文明～, Vandaru Hātsu ~Ushinawareta Kodai Bunmei~) is a turn-based tactical role-playing video game developed by Konami Computer Entertainment Tokyo for the PlayStation and later ported to the Sega Saturn by Konami Computer Entertainment Nagoya. The PlayStation version was distributed in Japan, North America, and Europe. The Saturn version was only released in Japan. There was also a Microsoft Windows version which was released only in Japan and South Korea, with Software renderer and Direct3D Support.

The game spawned a sequel, Vandal Hearts II, also for the PlayStation. A prequel, Vandal Hearts: Flames of Judgment was created for the PlayStation Network and Xbox Live Arcade. In 2004, Konami announced a Vandal Hearts game for the Nintendo DS, but it was later cancelled.

== Plot ==
The descendants of Toroah the Messiah established the Holy Ashah Dynasty on Sostegaria, ruling through religion and military power. Arris the Sage led a rebellion, overthrowing the dynasty and forming the Republic of Ishtaria. The new republic faces challenges from corrupt officials.

Ash Lambert and his allies uncover a conspiracy involving General Magnus Dunbar and a magical stone. They confront Magnus and battle corrupt forces. Magnus reveals the stone's power and a plot against the government. Ash's group liberates Magnus and others, leading to confrontations with the Crimson Guard.

The story escalates with Emperor Hel's rise to power and Dolf's coup attempt. Ash acquires the Vandal Heart sword and faces internal struggles. The party fights against Hel and Dolf, ultimately extinguishing the Flames of Judgment and Ash disappears.

The empire collapses without its leaders. Eleni starts a journal as the party members pursue individual paths. Dolan aids in rebuilding Ishtaria, while Kira embarks on self-discovery. Clint leads the DSF, Diego returns to his family business, and the others find their own endeavors. Eventually, Ash returns.

== Gameplay ==
Gameplay is carried out through an isometric viewpoint. Battles are carried out on a series of grid maps, which include cells not accessible like water, trees and buildings. Although the environment is three dimensional with a perspective that can be rotated by the player, the characters are two dimensional sprites. A character's movement allowance for a turn can be used all at once or split, between two or more movements. Turns are on a side-by-side basis; the player moves all of their characters before the AI is allowed to take its turn.

Most stages are completed by killing all the enemy characters. Other stages have different victory conditions, such as killing one particular enemy character, moving characters to a specific location on the map, or killing certain enemies while saving others. In every battle, the death of the party leader results in an immediate loss. Losing other characters in the party causes the loss of gold. The character is gone from the current stage and can return in the next stage. On stages that include rescuing other characters, the death of these characters also results in a loss.

=== Classes ===
A variety of characters join the battle party throughout the course of the game. Every character fits into one of seven character classes: Swordsman, Armor, Archer, Hawknight, Monk, Mage, and Cleric. The strengths of each class are determined through a hierarchy similar to the hand game Rock, Paper, Scissors (and Fire Emblem: Genealogy of the Holy War, another tactical role-playing game released in 1996): melee fighters (such as Swordsmen and Armors) are most effective when fighting against Archers. Archers are most effective when fighting against airborne characters such as Hawknights. Hawknights are most effective when fighting against Swordsmen. The other three classes are magic-users: the Monk pairs healing magic with average physical strength, where the Mage specializes in attack magic, and the Cleric specializes in healing magic. In addition, Mages are also most effective against Armor. Most magic-using classes have weak defensive capabilities when compared to other classes in the game and most attacking magic spells are stronger against heavily armored opponents.

== Release ==
Vandal Hearts was released in Japan in 1996, and localized to North America and Europe in early 1997. A Saturn conversion was released in Japan in 1997, and included a new rendered opening sequence, animated cutscenes, multiple endings, additional playable characters, and new weapons and spells.

== Reception ==
Reception

Aggregate score
Aggregator	Score
GameRankings	75% (PS1)

Review scores
Publication	Score
Electronic Gaming Monthly	8.675/10 (PS1)
GameSpot	7.1/10 (PS1)
Next Generation	4/5 (PS1)
MAN!AC	76/100

Vandal Hearts received primarily mixed reviews. Critics generally praised the incorporation of three-dimensional terrain and positioning into combat strategy, the sound effects, and the visual spectacle of the spells. However, most critics disapproved of the linear progression of the gameplay and story.

Reviews in both GameSpot and Next Generation likened Vandal Hearts to a bare bones reduction of the Shining Force games, eliminating the exploration, town wandering, and replay elements that had helped make those games classics. Next Generation nonetheless had a firmly positive overall assessment, arguing that "the lack of exploration is offset by the extremely engaging combat sequences." GameSpot instead considered it a "fatal flaw", and deemed Vandal Hearts a typical example of a fifth generation game with solid design and impressive graphics but less advanced gameplay than games of previous generations, though the reviewer highly praised the strategy involved in the battles. Robert Bannert at MAN!AC was positive about the game, but said it lacked depth and has little replay value. He cited the lack of hidden characters and an interactive storyline as weakness of the game, but praised the variety of the 3D terrain.

GamePro found several elements of the gameplay unusual and refreshing, such as the ability to choose each character's class, and was especially pleased with the full motion video cutscenes. The reviewer concluded, "Vandal Hearts' original gameplay and strong graphics and sounds should satisfy even the most particular RPGers." Dan Hsu of Electronic Gaming Monthly (EGM) criticized that the game sometimes spoils its own plot twists through its use of omniscient point of view, for instance by showing that the player characters are being betrayed before they learn it themselves. However, he praised the enemy AI and said the variety created by the different character classes "won me over." He and his three co-reviewers gave it EGM's "Game of the Month" award.

EGM named Vandal Hearts a runner-up for "Strategy Game of the Year" (behind Command & Conquer: Red Alert) at their 1997 Editors' Choice Awards.
