= Harvest Moon: Save the Homeland =

2001 video game

- North American box art
- Developer: Victor Interactive Software
- Publishers: JP: Victor Interactive Software; NA: Natsume Inc.
- Directors: Tomomi Yamatate; Setsuko Miyakoshi
- Producer: Yasuhiro Wada
- Designers: Miki Miyagi; Taichi Hyoudou
- Artist: Igusa Matsuyama
- Composers: Kimitaka Matsumae; Hitomi Shimizu; Gary Ashiya; Suguru Yamaguchi
- Series: Story of Seasons
- Platform: PlayStation 2
- Release: July 5, 2001: PlayStation 2; JP: July 5, 2001; NA: November 20, 2001 PlayStation Network; NA: November 1, 2011
- Genres: Life simulation, role-playing
- Mode: Single-player

Harvest Moon: Save the Homeland (Note: Japanese: 牧場物語3 ハートに火をつけて, Hepburn: Bokujō Monogatari 3: Heart ni Hi o Tsukete) is a 2001 farm life simulation game part of the popular Story of Seasons series of video games. An enhanced remake known as Harvest Moon: Hero of Leaf Valley was released in 2009 for PlayStation Portable.

== Overview ==
The player takes on the role of a 21-year-old man (named Toy by default) whose grandfather, Tony, recently died and left him his farm. Upon arriving at the farm, nominally to pick up his grandfather's belongings, the player's character encounters three "Harvest Sprites" named Nic, Nak, and Flak and the Harvest Goddess, who ask him to stay on the farm and help them.

The area is slated to be demolished within a year to make way for a resort and amusement park. The goal of the game is to find a way to save the town before the year's end. To do this, the protagonist must befriend some of the characters and help them with their respective goals. The outcome depends on whom he befriends. If he is successful, the town will be saved.

== Gameplay ==
The goal of Harvest Moon: Save the Homeland is to find a way to save the village from turning into a resort by the end of the year. There are 9 possible ways to save the village depending on the choices the player makes, such as which villagers the player befriends. For most of the endings, the character is involved in a quest (digging out a treasure, looking for magical ingredients, etc.).

After reaching an ending, the player has the option of restarting the game to try to "save the homeland" again, possibly achieving a different ending. Upon restarting the year the player may keep the money and animals earned. Each time the player finds a new ending, it gets saved in the Endings List, and the player receives the profiles of the villagers involved in that ending.

Like other Harvest Moon games, the player must tend to their farm by growing and selling crops and gathering produce from his or her animals. Unlike the other Harvest Moon games, marriage and parenthood are not included as options.

As in other Harvest Moon games, the player can adopt a dog and a horse. The horse can be used to get around the village faster, while the dog can be trained for useful tasks, such as herding cows into the barn.

The player can also own cows and chickens. Happy chickens and cows have the potential of giving golden eggs and golden milk. Eggs and milk are ingredients in recipes and can be used for cooking as well as for gifts or for profit.

== Reception ==
Reception

Aggregate score
Aggregator	Score
Metacritic	76/100

Review scores
Publication	Score
AllGame	3/5
Electronic Gaming Monthly	8/10
Famitsu	31/40
Game Informer	7.5/10
GameSpot	8.1/10
GameSpy	75%
IGN	8.8/10
Next Generation	3/5
Official U.S. PlayStation Magazine	4/5
RPGFan	90%

The game received "generally favorable reviews" according to the review aggregation website Metacritic. Eric Bratcher of NextGen called it "A wonderfully charismatic, unique title that every gamer should play, though your mileage will vary with your patience." In Japan, Famitsu gave it a score of 31 out of 40. Bro Buzz of GamePro said, "What's not to like about a solidly constructed RPG that encourages you to make friends, be kind to animals, and save a village? If you've got an agricultural attitude and a hankering for safe gameplay, you just might be a Harvest Moonie." (Note: GamePro gave the game two 3/5 scores for graphics and control, 2.5/5 for sound, and 3.5/5 for fun factor.)

== Enhanced remake ==
An enhanced remake titled Harvest Moon: Hero of Leaf Valley was released on March 19, 2009 for PlayStation Portable, with many major changes.
