= LocoRoco Cocoreccho! =

2007 video game

LocoRoco Cocoreccho
- Developer: Japan Studio
- Publisher: Sony Computer Entertainment
- Designer: Tsutomo Kouno
- Platform: PlayStation 3
- Release: WW: September 20, 2007
- Genre: Platform
- Mode: Single-player

LocoRoco Cocoreccho! (Note: Japanese: おいでよロコロコ！！ BuuBuu Cocoreccho!, Hepburn: Oideyo LocoRoco!! BuuBuu Cocoreccho!) is a 2007 platform video game developed by Japan Studio and published by Sony Computer Entertainment for the PlayStation 3. The game was released on the PlayStation Network. Described as an "interactive screensaver", LocoRoco Cocoreccho! features an autonomous two-dimensional environment in which the world and characters play even without input from the player.

== Gameplay ==
In the game, players control a butterfly (the "Cocoreccho" of the title) to gather LocoRoco that are dispersed throughout a level and direct them to a goal in a large enough group to pass through. The player can call LocoRoco to the character, which is depicted as a ring of light emanating from the Cocoreccho, which prompts LocoRoco to move toward the Cocoreccho. Players can also use the Cocoreccho to tilt and jolt various characters and objects within the environment by positioning the Cocoreccho on the intended target and tilting or shaking the controller. Along the route there are three types of minigames. In each mini game it is possible to increase the number of LocoRoco by up to 15 by achieving a high score.

== Reception ==
LocoRoco Cocoreccho received "mixed or average" reviews, according to review aggregator Metacritic.

Reception

Aggregate score
Aggregator	Score
Metacritic	72/100

Review scores
Publication	Score
Destructoid	5.5/10
Eurogamer	9/10
GamesRadar+	3/5
IGN	6/10
VideoGamer.com	8/10
