= Akiba's Trip: Undead & Undressed =

2013 video game

- North American cover art
- Developer: Acquire
- Publishers: JP: Acquire; NA: Xseed Games; PAL: NIS America; WW: Xseed Games (PC)
- Producers: Junichirow Tamura; Teruyuki Morooka
- Artists: Akio Watanabe; Manami Chiba; Jun Nishiono; Mai Nakashita
- Composer: Toshiko Tasaki
- Series: Akiba's Trip
- Engine: PhyreEngine
- Platforms: PlayStation 3, PlayStation Vita, PlayStation 4, Windows, Nintendo Switch
- Release: November 7, 2013: PS3, PSVita; JP: November 7, 2013; NA: August 12, 2014; EU: October 10, 2014; AU: October 16, 2014 PS4; JP: July 3, 2014; NA: November 25, 2014; EU: February 6, 2015; AU: February 19, 2015 Windows May 26, 2015
- Genres: Action-adventure; beat 'em up
- Mode: Single-player

Akiba's Trip: Undead & Undressed, released as Akiba's Trip 2 in Japan, is a 2013 action-adventure open-world video game for the PlayStation Vita, PlayStation 3, PlayStation 4, and Microsoft Windows by Acquire. It is the sequel to Akiba's Trip on the PlayStation Portable. A third game in the series, Akiba's Trip Festa, was released in November 2016.

A "Director's Cut" of the game was released in Japan in April 2023 for Windows, Nintendo Switch, and PS4.

== Gameplay ==
In-game screenshot of the combat system, demonstrating the player's ability to strip clothes off enemies

In Akiba's Trip, the player explores Akihabara and strip the clothes off "Synthisters". There are different things to do such as buy items from shops, enter maid cafes to eat food and play games, or head to the battle arena to train and increase player rank.

The story is played as a visual novel where the player gets to choose dialogue options to progress the story. Certain options will increase the player character's affection level with certain characters that will diverge into different endings for the player to experience. A hint system is unlocked when beating the game to ensure that the affection level will increase for the character that the player chooses.

When initiated into battle, the player chooses what weapon to use. The player aims attacks at the lower, middle or upper part of the body to weaken the enemy's clothing, with each body part having their own respective button. There is a combo attack when pressing the attack button repeatedly, a forward attack for moving the analog stick forward while attacking, a strong attack for moving the analog stick back while attacking along with an aerial attack and guard attack. Guarding dodges all attacks but leaves the player character vulnerable to having their clothes stripped but the player can also counter-attack the Synthister's attack or if their clothing is flashing, can counter-strip their clothes. When the clothes are flashing, the player can hold the attack button to strip the clothes off but if the clothes are not flashing, they can hold the button and then mash it to force strip it. The more the player strips a certain type of clothing, the more their strip skill will increase, allowing the clothes not to tear so that they can keep the clothing for inventory. If the meter on the top left of the screen is filled and if the player is allied with Shizuku, Touka, Kati, Shion or Nana, they can perform a unison strip, where they do heavy damage to a Synthister and cause the other Synthisters to be dizzy, stripping them until they are no longer dizzy or the chain strip ends.

== Plot ==
Set in Akihabara, the shopping area has been invaded by creatures known as "Synthisters" who prey on the patrons of Akihabara, feasting on their social energy and will to live. These enemies can only be stopped by direct exposure to sunlight, meaning that the player is required to defeat these synthisters by violently stripping off their clothes and exposing them to sunlight. The storyline revolves around a conspiracy behind the Magaimono organization that the player explores. Within the game, there are over 130 real life Akihabara shops that the player is able to visit.

== Characters ==
- Protagonist (Nanashi) (主人公(ナナシ)) - The main character, an otaku-type high school student, fond of Akihabara. Turned into a Synthister by the Magaimono organization but escaped.
- Tohko Sagisaka (鷺坂登子(トーコ)) - The protagonist's childhood friend, and member of the Akihabara neighbourhood watch.
- Shizuku Tokikaze (刻風雫) - A girl with purple braided hair with a mysterious power and a friendly Nighteater.
- Rin Tokikaze (刻風凛) - A popular national singing idol. As the game progresses, she is revealed to be Shizuku's sister.
- Soga Kagutsuki (輝月宗牙) - The main antagonist of the game. He is also from the same Nighteater clan as Shizuku and Rin. He wishes to turn all of Akihabara into Synthisters.
- Shion Kasugai (霞会志遠) - A 26-year-old female CEO of a pharmaceutical company and acquaintance of the protagonist.
- Nana (ナナ) - The protagonist's hikikomori little sister who lives in a room behind the bar at Mogra.
- Zenya Amo (天羽禅夜) - A ringleader of Magaimono. He is the first major antagonist introduced.
- Kaito Tachibana (怪盗橘) - An older twin brother of Yuto.
- Yuto Tachibana (勇人橘) - A younger twin brother of Kaito.
- Kati Räikkönen (カティ ライコネン) - A Finnish girl who came to study in Japan, because she's fond of anime and JRPGs. She works part-time as a maid in the bar Mogra.
- Koma Sakaguchi (高麗坂口) - An assistant to Shion, later he revealed himself to be a servant of Soga.
- Kihachi Sugiyama (Pops) (喜八杉山(ポップス)) - He is the owner of Mogra, and the leader of Akiba's Freedom Fighters.

== Development and release ==
Development of the game was first announced in Famitsu in August 2013. An official trailer was released on August 29, 2013, introducing the main gameplay concepts, including a feature which allows two characters to strip an enemy's clothes off in unison.

Akiba's Trip: Undead & Undressed was localised into Chinese and Korean with the assistance of Sony Computer Entertainment Japan. The game features collaboration DLC in the form of character costumes and equippable items, including those from Ragnarok Odyssey Ace, Disgaea, Hyperdimension Neptunia, The Legend of Heroes, Super Sonico, and Genshiken.

Xseed Games localized the game in North America and released it on August 12, 2014, on the PS3 and Vita, with the PS4 version following in late 2014. NIS America released the game in Europe on October 10, 2014. Xseed Games' western localization of the game features original Japanese audio and text, and Japanese advertising for real-life Akihabara locations and products within the original game remains intact. The physical version shipped with dual audio, with the game being stored on a 4GB Vita cartridge.

== Reception ==
Reception

Aggregate scores
Aggregator	Score
GameRankings	(PC) 80% (Vita) 66% (PS3, PS4) 58%
Metacritic	(Vita) 64/100 (PS3, PS4) 57/100

Review scores
Publication	Score
Destructoid	(PS3) 7/10
Edge	(PS4) 4/10
Electronic Gaming Monthly	(Vita) 6.5/10
Famitsu	33/40
Game Informer	(PS3) 6/10
GameRevolution	(PS3) 8/10
GameSpot	(Vita) 4/10
GameTrailers	(PS3) 6/10
GameZone	5/10
Hardcore Gamer	3.5/5
PlayStation Official Magazine – Australia	(Vita) 70%
Polygon	(PS3) 6/10
Push Square	7/10
RPGFan	(PS3) 60%
The Digital Fix	(Vita) 6/10
New York Daily News	(PS4) 2/5

On the game's release in Japan, Famitsu gave the PlayStation 3 and PlayStation Vita versions each a score of one nine and three eights for a total of 33 out of 40.

Following the game's release in the west, it received "mixed" reviews on all platforms according to the review aggregation website Metacritic. Hardcore Gamer praised the Vita version's gameplay and amount of content, but criticized the technical problems and fan-service. They also stated that "Akiba is an open-world game, but it's hard to fully get lost in it because of how many loading screens you run into when traveling from section to section of the city." Upon its PC release, HonestGamers praised the game's lampooning of a source material it clearly loved though noted the battle system was "gloriously clumsy".

The Digital Fix gave the Vita version a score of six out of ten, saying, "It's certainly not a joke game, and the writing quality does elevate it for those who have an appreciation of the material that is being targeted, but the whole combat mechanic becomes so tiresome so quickly that you can't help but wish the game could have been shorter, the story more focused, instead of the more positive elements of the game losing some of their sheen from hiding behind the rest of it." Metro, however, gave the PlayStation 3 version a score of four out of ten, saying, "The greatest offence here is not sexism but simply tedium at the game's shallow action, although while the one note joke lasts it is a funny one." New York Daily News gave the PlayStation 4 version two stars out of five, calling it "an example of what happens when you build an anime RPG around the solely superficial. It's Shin Megami Tensei with absolutely no depth and a nonsensical story that somehow almost works. Somehow, there are charms to all the camp, but technical flaws drag all that down, leaving a game that will tug at your curiosity - and then bitterly disappoint."

During the first week of release in Japan, the game sold 33,476 PlayStation Vita physical retail units and 20,230 PlayStation 3 physical retail units, ranking at fourth and eighth place respectively amongst all software sales that week.
