= Michiru Ōshima =

Japanese composer (born 1961)

Michiru Ōshima 大島 ミチル
- Born: Nagasaki, Japan
- Genres: Classical; orchestral; electronic; ambient
- Occupations: Composer; arranger
- Instruments: Piano
- Website: michiruoshima.com

Michiru Ōshima (大島 ミチル, Oshima Michiru; born March 16, 1961) is a Japanese composer and arranger. She works on music in wide range of areas, such as anime, films, television series, video games, and concerts. She has written scores for over 100 films, over 200 television titles, video games, various types of events, concerts, theaters, among others. Ōshima is one of the most prolific living composers for film, anime, and video games. She has released over 300 CDs including film soundtracks and artist CDs. Her works include composition for Godzilla vs. Megaguirus, Godzilla Against Mechagodzilla, and Godzilla: Tokyo S.O.S. films and scores for numerous anime television series, including Fullmetal Alchemist, Fullmetal Alchemist the Movie: Conqueror of Shamballa, Nabari no Ou, Queen Emeraldas, Xam'd: Lost Memories, Arc the Lad, and Weathering Continent. In addition to the soundtracks on Kaiju films and anime music, she has composed music for several video games such as Genghis Khan II: Clan of the Gray Wolf for Super NES, Ico for PlayStation 2, Legend of Legaia for PlayStation and its PlayStation 2 sequel Legaia 2: Duel Saga, Arc the Lad III, Deemo, Midnight Play by the company Tivola based on the art illustrations of Květa Pacovská, and an orchestral arrangement of a Zelda medley for the Wii and GameCube game The Legend of Zelda: Twilight Princess. She was also the composer for a Japanese stage musical adaptation of the classic Hollywood film Roman Holiday. Her latest work includes the composition of several music tracks for the highly acclaimed Chinese espionage thriller film The Message and a 2017 Chinese mystery thriller film The Devotion of Suspect X.

She is a member of both the Japan Academy Film Prize Association and the Academy of Motion Picture Arts and Sciences.

== Biography ==
Graduated from Kunitachi College of Music, Department of Music Composition, Ōshima began her activities as a composer and arranger while in college, and has been involved in composing music for films, commercials, television programs, anime, ambient music, and tunes for classical musicians. She released the first Symphony entitled "Orasho" when she was still in college. Through her masterful manipulation of both orchestras and synthesizers, she has attracted attention from various sectors for creating grandiose, dramatic sounds, and beautiful melodies.

Ōshima was the youngest person to be awarded the 1st prize at International Electone Festival / International Electone Concours in 1977. Her other awards include the 52nd (1998) and 67th (2013) Mainichi Film Contest Award for Best Music, the 21st (1998), 24th (2001), 26th (2003), 27th (2004), 29th (2006), 30th (2007), and 38th (2016) Japan Academy Film Prize for Music, and the 31st Japan Academy Prize for Best Score, Tokyo Anime Award for Best Music in 2006, Best Composer Award at Jackson Hole Film Festival 2007 (in the United States). Moreover, Ōshima has composed a large number of music for music festivals in France and Luxembourg, stages in Belgium, or concerts in Japan and United States. She also recorded and conducted with orchestras, and musicians from all over the world such as the United States, Australia, France, Russia, Belgium, England, the Czech Republic, Austria, Poland, Italy, Hungary, and Bulgaria, including a concert "KAIJU CRESCENDO: AN EVENING OF JAPANESE MONSTER MUSIC" at the G-FEST XXVI (2020) in Chicago. Ōshima was one of the 27 composers for the album 'In 27 Pieces: the Hilary Hahn Encores' performed by violinist Hilary Hahn which was awarded a 2015 Grammy Award in the Best Chamber Music category (she composed "Memories"). She has been engaged in many governmental projects as well, such as music director at "40th Year of ASEAN-Japan" in 2013, in which she supervised and managed musicians in ASEAN (Association of Southeast Asian Nations) countries, organized concerts in ASEAN countries and composed music for the ASEAN Summit.

== Awards and nominations ==
Awards

- 2005: Yubari International Fantastic Film Festival Award for Composer Orchestrator
- 2006: Tokyo Anime Award for Best Music for Conqueror of Shamballa
- 2008: Japanese Academy Award for Music of the Year for Bizan

Nominations

- 1998: Japanese Academy Award for Outstanding Achievement in Music for Paradise Lost
- 2001: Japanese Academy Award for Outstanding Achievement in Music for Nagasaki Burabura Bushi
- 2003: Japanese Academy Award for Outstanding Achievement in Music for The Sun Also Rises and Copycat Criminal
- 2004: Japanese Academy Award for Outstanding Achievement in Music for Like Asura
- 2006: Japanese Academy Award for Outstanding Achievement in Music for Year One in the North
- 2007: Japanese Academy Award for Outstanding Achievement in Music for Memories of Tomorrow
- 2016: Japanese Academy Award for Outstanding Achievement in Music for 125 Years Memory

== Compositions ==
=== Film soundtracks (selective) ===
- 1995: Winds of God (Yôko Narahashi)
- 1998: Puraido: Unmei no Toki (Shunya Itō)
- 1998: Ohaka ga nai! (Takahito Hara)
- 2000: Godzilla vs. Megaguirus (Masaaki Tezuka)
- 2002: Hi wa mata noboru (Kiyoshi Sasabe)
- 2002: Mohou-han (Yoshimitsu Morita)
- 2002: Godzilla Against Mechagodzilla (Masaaki Tezuka)
- 2003: Godzilla: Tokyo S.O.S. (Masaaki Tezuka)
- 2005: Princess Raccoon (Seijun Suzuki)
- 2006: Memories of Tomorrow (Yukihiko Tsutsumi)
- 2007: Tsubaki Sanjûrô (Yoshimitsu Morita)
- 2009: The Message
- 2010: Ghost: Mouichido Dakishimetai (Tarô Ohtani)
- 2015: 125 Years Memory (Mitsutoshi Tanaka)
- 2017: The Devotion of Suspect X (film)
- 2020: Japan's Independence (Shunya Itō)
- 2022: SABAKAN

=== Show soundtracks (selective) ===
- 2004: Guns of the world VOL. 3

=== Anime soundtracks (selective) ===
- 1986: Saint Elmo – Hikari no Raihousha (Tomoharu Katsumata)
- 1992: The Weathering Continent (Koichi Mashimo)
- 1993: Casshan: Robot Hunter (Hiroyuki Fukushima)
- 1993: Miracle Girls (Takashi Anno, Hiroko Tokita)
- 1994: Lord of Lords Ryu Knight (Toshifumi Kawase)
- 1995: Legend of Crystania (Ryutaro Nakamura)
- 1996: Boys Over Flowers (Shigeyasu Yamauchi)
- 1996: Gall Force: The Revolution
- 1998: Fancy Lala (Motosuke Takahashi)
- 1998: Queen Emeraldas (Yuji Asada)
- 1999: Arc the Lad (Itsuro Kawasaki)
- 1999: Magic User's Club (Junichi Sato)
- 2003: Pretty Guardian Sailor Moon (2003 TV Series) (Yasuko Kobayashi)
- 2003: Fullmetal Alchemist (Seiji Mizushima)
- 2005: Fullmetal Alchemist: Conqueror of Shamballa (Seiji Mizushima)
- 2005: Garasu no Usagi (Setsuko Shibuichi)
- 2006: Madan Senki Ryukendo (TV Series)
- 2006: Le Chevalier d'Éon (Kazuhiro Furuhashi)
- 2006: Project Blue Earth SOS (Tensai Okamura)
- 2008: Xam'd: Lost Memories (Masayuki Miyaji)
- 2008: Nabari no Ou (Kunihisa Sugishima)
- 2010: The Tatami Galaxy (Masaaki Yuasa)
- 2010: Sound of the Sky (Mamoru Kanbe)
- 2011: Tezuka Osamu no Buddha (Kozo Morishita)
- 2012: Fuse Teppō Musume no Torimonochō (Masayuki Miyaji)
- 2012: Blast of Tempest (Masahiro Andō)
- 2013: Little Witch Academia (Yoh Yoshinari)
- 2013: Aura: Maryūinkōga Saigo no Tatakai (Seiji Kishi)
- 2013: Patema Inverted (Yasuhiro Yoshiura)
- 2015: Snow White with the Red Hair (Masahiro Andō)
- 2015: Rokka no Yūsha (Takeo Takahashi)
- 2017: The Night Is Short, Walk On Girl (Masaaki Yuasa)
- 2018: Bloom Into You (Makoto Katō)
- 2019: Ride Your Wave (Masaaki Yuasa)
- 2020: Hula Fulla Dance (Shinya Watada)
- 2021: Star Wars: Visions - The Twins & The Elder (Studio Trigger)
- 2022: Tatami Time Machine Blues (Shingo Natsume)
- 2023: Dog Signal (Kazuhiro Furuhashi)
- 2024: Bucchigiri?! (Hiroko Utsumi)
- 2025: Anne Shirley (Hiroshi Kawamata)
- 2025: Whoever Steals This Book (Daisei Fukuoka)
- 2025: Star Wars: Visions - The Smuggler (Studio Trigger)

=== Video games soundtracks (selective) ===
- 1992: Taikou Risshiden
- 1992: Undercover Cops (arranges)
- 1998: Midnight Play (Das Mitternachtsspiel)
- 1998: Legend of Legaia
- 2000: Arc the Lad III (arranges)
- 2001: Ico
- 2002: Legaia 2: Duel Saga (with Yasunori Mitsuda and Hitoshi Sakimoto)
- 2002: Suikoden (arranges)
- 2003: Arc the Lad: Twilight of the Spirits (arranges)
- 2006: The Legend of Zelda: Twilight Princess (arranges)
- 2017: DEEMO (White Rain, Tree of Dreams, Voice of Cell, Little Love, Lonely Pianist)
- 2019: Shining Nikki

=== Drama soundtracks (selective) ===
- 2001: Sayonara, Ozu Sensei
- 2002: Gokusen
- 2002: Satorare
- 2003: Tenshi mitai
- 2005: Yume de Aimashou
- 2006: Oishii Proposal
- 2006: CA to Oyobi
- 2006: Regatta
- 2007: Hotelier
- 2007: Watashi wa Kai ni Naritai
- 2008: Yasuko to Kenji
- 2010: Misaki Number One!!

=== Selected concerts and projects ===
- 1980s: Symphony No.1: Orasho
- 2005: For the East (with the Ravel Quartet)
- 2006: London Essay (with Dai Kimura)
- 2007: Le Premier amour (from the album "Smile" by Japanese violist Emiri Miyamoto)
- 2007: Amanda (with Kaori Muraji (classical guitar) and the Orchestre des Virtuoses de Paris)
- 2009: Concerto for saxophone (with Daniel Gremelle (saxophone) and the Tokyo City Philharmonic Orchestra)
- 2010: Concerto for viola (with Pierre Lenert (viola) and the Kyushu Symphony Orchestra)
- 2011: Ganbalo Nippon (short film The Orchestra in Hot Air Balloon for Japan)
- 2011: Vocalise (with the mezzo-soprano Irina De Baghy for Festival Sérénade in Surgères)
- 2011: Requiem ~ It lies at the bottom of the sea (with Ensemble Lucilin in Luxembourg)
- 2013: In 27 Pieces: The Hilary Hahn Encores (musical project with the violinist Hilary Hahn)
- 2013: Viola Sonata (with Pierre Lenert (viola) and Ariane Jacob (piano) for Festival Sérénade in Surgères in France)
- 2013: Concerto for piano quartet with Orchestra (with Musicians of Opera de Paris and the Kyushu Symphony Orchestra)
- 2013: The ASEAN-JAPAN "Drums & Voices" Concert Tour (the 40th year of ASEAN-Japan friendship and cooperation project)
- 2015: Symphony No.2: Since 1945 (with the Kyushu Symphony Orchestra and Hiroko Kokubu (piano))
- 2017: Symphonic Suite "Sama" (with the Kansai Philharmonic Orchestra)
- 2017: Suite for Male Voice Choir "Message of the Voice" (with the Glee club of Tokyo Keizai University)
- 2018: "Augustus": Suite for Orchestra and Chorus (with the Kansai Philharmonic Orchestra and the Osaka Prefectural Yuhigaoka High School Music Department)
- 2018: Jin & Rin: 2 Rhapsodies for Clarinet, Marimba and Orchestra (with Richard Stoltzman (clarinet), Mika Stoltzman (marimba) and the Kansai Philharmonic Orchestra)
- 2018: Concerto for Koto and Shakuhachi (with Chiaki Endo (koto), Dozan Fujiwara (shakuhachi) and the Kansai Philharmonic Orchestra)
- 2018: Musical Sanza and Okuni
- 2019: Godzilla in Chicago - C.H.C.A.G
- 2019: Beyond the Point of No Return (with Japan Philharmonic Orchestra)
- 2020: Koto recital Lacrima (with Chiaki Endo (koto))
- 2021: Concerto No.2 for Koto and Shakuhachi Seasons12 (with Chiaki Endo (koto), Dozan Fujiwara (shakuhachi) and the Japan Philharmonic Orchestra)
- 2023: Flux et reflux (with Paris Saint German-en-Lay Orchestra Concert)
- 2023: For Blue Promise (Siletz Bay Music Festival )
