= Arc the Lad: Twilight of the Spirits =

2003 video game

- Developer: Cattle Call
- Publisher: Sony Computer Entertainment
- Director: Yoshihiro Yamamoto
- Producers: Yoshihiro Yamamoto; Hiroshi Yamamoto
- Artist: Ryuichi Kunisue
- Writers: Osamu Yamazaki; Retsu Iwakata
- Composers: Koji Sakurai; Takayuki Hattori; Yuko Fukushima; Masahiro Andoh; Takashi Harada
- Series: Arc the Lad
- Platform: PlayStation 2
- Release: JP: March 20, 2003; NA: June 25, 2003; EU: January 30, 2004
- Genre: Tactical role-playing
- Mode: Single-player

Arc the Lad: Twilight of the Spirits ("アークザラッド 精霊の黄昏" Āku za Raddo: Seirei no Tasogare, also known as Arc: Twilight of the Spirits in Europe) is a 2003 tactical role-playing video game developed by Cattle Call and published by Sony Computer Entertainment. It is the sixth game released in the Arc the Lad series, and the first game in the series released for the PlayStation 2 and made in 3D. It originally released in Japan in March 2003, alongside a premium box set, later in June 2003 in North America (marking it the first game in the series to be published by Sony in the region), and later in January 2004 in Europe (marking it as the first game in the series to release in the region). The game was executively produced by Tekken creator, Seiichi Ishii, and received developmental support by certain members of Zener Works Inc, developers of Okage: Shadow King. It was followed up with a sequel in 2005, Arc the Lad: End of Darkness.

Taking place 1,000 years after Arc the Lad III, Twilight of the Spirits follows two races, human and Deimos (Mazoku (魔族, Demon clan) in the Japanese version), who have had centuries long conflicts regarding displacement and human use of the magical Spirit Stones to their power machinery while Deimos use it as their life force. The game's plot follows an intersecting storyline between human and Deimos hybrid twin brothers, Kharg and Darc, who attempt to locate the five Great Spirit Stones for their own ambitions while crossing paths with the autocratic Dilzweld Army, who plan to use the stones to take over the world, and a mysterious girl who is linked to all three.

Twilight of the Spirits received average-to-positive reception from critics upon release. It received praise for its battle system, interconnecting storyline, and music, but criticism for its voice acting, lack of sidequests, and balancing.

== Gameplay ==
Arc the Lad: Twilight of the Spirits has the player going through the game as Kharg and Darc, playing through their individual stories back to back. As the story is intersecting, some of the locations are visited with both characters. Like many conventional RPGs, the player goes from town to town, traversing the world map to specific areas, and getting into battles along the way. Since there are five continents in the game, Kharg or Darc can use the Big Owl ship or the Pyron monster respectively to travel to different continents.

Combat is similar to the first three Arc the Lad games, using a tactical format. However, unlike the original trilogy, Twilight of the Spirits uses a circular based movement system, rather than grid like movement. There are also no magic points. Rather, the game uses "Spirit Stone' items for magic and special attacks, which can be bought in stores, picked up from fallen enemies or from boxes and other scenery. During combat, players can check character stats and equip items. By pressing R1, the player can see the range of their attack, which can allow them to attack multiple enemies if lined up, as well as allowing them to attack on any side of an enemy.

After enemies are killed, XP is given, along with SP, which allows characters to obtain new special moves or magic. The more a player obtains, they can rank up which opens up new abilities. There are fourteen playable characters in the game, two temporary, and two secret. The player can use up to six characters in combat, the max in Kharg and Darc's party until their eventual joint partnership at the end of the game. Some fights however, will have characters using only one character.

== Plot ==
One thousand years have passed since the events of Arc the Lad III, and as a result, the world featured in the original trilogy has evolved. However, tensions between humans and a race of emerging humanoid monsters called Deimos, have run rampant for centuries, resulting in several long wars and leading the two races to ban any and all interactions. In the midst of this strife, a human woman named Nafia falls in love with a Drakyr Deimos named Windalf, and they give birth to a pair of twins they name Kharg and Darc. Due to relations between humans and Deimos being illegal, they are sought after by other Drakyr for not only violating this rule, but also Windalf for stealing the Wind Stone, the treasure of the Drakyr. Windalf is attacked with Darc in his hands, but Nafia is able to escape with Kharg.

Seventeen years later, the twins have now grown and are living different lives. Kharg lives in peace and harmony with Nafia in the town of Yewbell, while Darc is a slave to a toad like Deimos woman named Geedo after Windalf's death. During their stories, the halves of the Wind Stone that Nafia and Windalf gave them respectively, finally summon the Wind Spirit, who tells them their destiny. With this information, Darc and Kharg's main goal is to collect the five Great Spirit Stones and use them for the benefit of the Deimos or humans respectively. Kharg wishes to destroy the Deimos in order for humans to live peacefully. Meanwhile, Darc wishes to destroy the humans for the protection of the Deimos and to be their overall king. During their quest however, they cross paths with the autocratic Dilzweld Army, who plan to invade all five continents with the power of the five Great Spirit Stones they plan to collect.

In their separate journeys, they form alliances with other characters. In Kharg's story, he is accompanied by his childhood friend Paulette, a self-proclaimed prince named Maru, an ex-soldier who now lives with nature named Ganz, and an ex-member and head scientist of the Dilzweld Army named Tatjana. Darc's story has him accompanied by Delma, the sister of the Orcon leader, Densimo, Volk, a Lupine who wishes for revenge against the humans for killing his wife and son, Camellia, a Pianta Sage who became withered at the hands of the Dilzweld Army, and Bebedora, a puppet master created by the Divine Ruler. Other characters who Kharg and Darc cross paths with include Lilia Getmann, a mysterious girl who is being sought out after by the Dilzweld Army, Zev, an old treasure hunter, Samson, a thief who steals only from the Dilzweld Army and later revealed, Lilia's father, and Lord Darkham Ekid na Bard, ruler of Dilzweld and the central antagonist of the game.

Though Kharg and Darc are able obtain various of the Great Spirit Stones throughout the plot, as the game progresses, Darkham and the Dilzweld Army soon obtain four of the five Great Spirit Stones, and are forced to make an artificial Wind Stone as Kharg and Darc have the two halves of the Wind Stone.

Towards the end of the game, Kharg and his friends finally confront Darkham at Maluise Tower, where he uses the five Great Spirit Stones and Lilia to awaken the Flying Castle used by King Gaidel at the end of Arc the Lad II, which he plans to use to destroy the Deimos. It is here that Lilia is revealed to be "the friend of the spirits", the final key to activating the castle. In a show of its power, Darkham destroys the large populated city of Cathena. After defeating him, Darkham tells Kharg he must take his place in destroying the Deimos, and commits suicide. Soon, Darc and his friends arrive, and he and Kharg make a deal on whoever wins a duel between them and their allies will get all five Great Spirit Stones. The player then must choose between fighting the humans or Deimos, but no matter whoever wins, Zev appears after the fight and reveals himself to be the Divine Ruler, a human who gained dark powers 3,000 years prior to the events of Arc the Lad and would later become the Lord of the Black Abyss, the series' main antagonist. He tells everyone that they were just his puppets in getting him all five Great Spirit Stones. He then takes the stones and Lilia, and goes off to the Flying Castle. Whoever wins goes there first, and then the losing side goes after them.

After both the humans and Deimos have altercations between working between each other at first, upon their reunion, Kharg and Darc finally come to an agreement to work with each other, and after going through all the floors, Kharg, Darc, and all their friends arrive just in time to see the Divine Ruler use Lilia to awaken the powers of an ark that sealed the Divine Ruler 3,000 years ago, and the same ark used by Romalia to bring back The Lord of the Black Abyss in Arc the Lad II. After absorbing all the powers, the Divine Ruler becomes the Lord of the Black Abyss once again. He then takes everyone to a realm of darkness, where their inner demons torment them until either Kharg or Darc (depending on who the player is playing as) snaps them out of it. After defeating the monsters creating the visions, the group has to fight Lilia, who is trapped by the Lord of the Black Abyss. After defeating her, the Lord of the Black Abyss tells them that they're stuck there forever, but as hope is lost, Lilia is revived in part due to the power of Arc and Kukuru. After using the power of the ark, which was in the hearts of everyone, everyone is transported to the lair of the Lord of the Black Abyss, and ultimately, face off with him.

After defeating him, the Lord of the Black Abyss still has power, and threatens to destroy all humans and Deimos. Lilia plans to give her own life like Arc did to seal him away. However, the spirits contained in the five Great Spirit Stones appear and seal away the Lord of the Black Abyss, at the cost of leaving the world and the Deimos losing their life-force. The group returns to Cragh Island, and before Kharg and Darc can clash again, Lilia stops them and helps them both come to an agreement that even though humans and Deimos will most likely clash again in the future, it's better to enjoy the peace they already have.

== Reception ==
Reception

Aggregate score
Aggregator	Score
Metacritic	72/100

Review scores
Publication	Score
Edge	6/10
Electronic Gaming Monthly	7/10
Game Informer	8.75/10
GamePro	3.5/5
GameRevolution	B−
GameSpot	8/10
GameSpy	3/5
GameZone	8.2/10
IGN	8.2/10
Official U.S. PlayStation Magazine	4/5

Arc the Lad: Twilight of the Spirits received "mixed or average" reviews, according to video game review aggregator Metacritic. GameSpot named it the best PlayStation 2 game of June 2003.
