= Arc the Lad: End of Darkness =

2004 video game

- Developer: Cattle Call (Note: Additional work by Sony Computer Entertainment Japan.)
- Publishers: JP: Sony Computer Entertainment; NA: Namco
- Director: Yasuhito Kobayashi
- Producer: Yoshihiro Yamamoto
- Programmers: Tomoyuki Uno; Yoshiyuki Serizawa; Kaoru Koga; Tomonori Nishikawa; Sachiko Yanagihara
- Artist: Ryuichi Kunisue
- Composers: Koji Sakurai; Takayuki Hattori; Yuko Fukushima
- Series: Arc the Lad
- Platform: PlayStation 2
- Release: JP: November 3, 2004; NA: June 15, 2005
- Genre: Action role-playing
- Modes: Single-player, multiplayer

Arc the Lad: End of Darkness, known in Japan as Arc the Lad Generation (Note: Japanese: アークザラッド ジェネレーション, Hepburn: Ākuzaraddo Jenerēshon), is an action role-playing video game developed by Cattle Call and published by Sony Computer Entertainment for the PlayStation 2. It is the second and last game from the Arc the Lad series on the console, the first being Arc the Lad: Twilight of the Spirits. It was released in North America by Namco.

Arc the Lad: End of Darkness takes place five years after Arc the Lad: Twilight of the Spirits, and reuses many of the settings, characters, enemies, and music from the previous game. The world has many new technologies and job classes and is less rife with racial tensions between the Deimos (intelligent creatures) and Humans. However, the main natural resource from Twilight of the Spirits, Spirit Stones, are nearly depleted, and there is uncertainty about the future of the Deimos and Humans.

This is the only Arc the Lad game to use a real-time battle system, instead of a tactics-based battle system. Generally, this was viewed as a step backwards for the series because of its poor execution. End of Darkness also featured online play with up to 8 players playing in a 4-on-4 death match or 4-person co-op. However, the servers were taken down in June 2006.

== Gameplay ==
Arc the Lad: End of Darkness is a role-playing game that requires the player to travel from city to city around the world in order to complete missions assigned to them by the guilds located there. There are two types of missions: storyline missions whose completions allow the player to take tests and further the plot, and optional missions for items and experience.

Unlike the previous four games, which were tactical, End of Darkness is a real time action RPG. In battle, the player can execute standard attacks, dash forward and backwards, target enemies, strafe enemies, and use four abilities. The player's abilities and equipment are determined by what cards they have assigned to their character. There are ability cards (magic, "gimmick", and special skill), and "part" cards (attack, defense, and accessory). Cards can be acquired by picking them up during battle or purchasing them in shops. The player can also synthesize cards to create new ones.

The player can unlock and play with up to 24 other characters from previous Arc the Lad titles. These cannot be used in the storyline missions, but can be used in extra missions and in online play. The playable characters include all playable characters from Twilight of the Spirits (sans Densimo and Samson), Arc, Kukuru, Tosh, and Iga from Arc the Lad, Elc, Leiza, and Shu from Arc the Lad II, and Alec, Lutz, Theo, and Cheryl from Arc the Lad III.

=== Online ===
A new feature to the Arc games, online play allows the player to either explore the world with friends or to go head on head in four on four battles. After low online participation and poor reviews, the online server was shut down June 16, 2006.

== Synopsis ==
=== Story ===
The story follows Edda, a young boy from Cragh Island who as the only exorcist alive, plans to travel the world along with his Slothian Deimos friend, Hemo. While Edda is building their boat, Hemo returns with a strange book he found in the forest. Unable to read it, he hands it to Edda, who can understand only a portion of the text before they are interrupted by a mysterious girl who angrily demands the book back. After questioning her, the girl reveals herself to be Kirika; an archaeologist. Running away after getting the book back, Edda notices Kirika's sporting a strange device on her arm, and recalls seeing it before. The device, known as an ALD, is worn by Hunters. This causes Edda grows curious about them.

Later on, the elder of the island asks Edda to guide a hunter named Luberus through the Cave of Truth in search of a thief, and gives him his father's cudgel. Upon arriving, Edda and Hemo encounters dead hunters whilst making their way through the cave. Upon arriving at the end, they see Kirika by the body of Luberus. Before Edda and Hemo can question her, they are all cornered by a monster with black smoke around it, known as a Malademon (the antagonists of the game). Edda successfully exorcises the Malademon, however grows weak and passes out.

Upon waking up, Edda finds himself in the town of Milmarna (a town from Arc the Lad: Twilight of the Spirits). While looking for Hemo, he first encounters the Hunter's Guild, where Hemo had been talking about wanting to making Edda a hunter. After finding Hemo, he claims that the head of the Guild said he can make Edda a hunter (denying such a thing when Edda questions him). He then directs Edda to Maru, the Guild Master of Milmarna, and one of the ten 'Heroes' (the playable characters from Twilight of the Sprirts involved with the defeat of the Lord of the Black Abyss). Encountering Maru, who is arguing against marrying Foh, his cousin, he is able to sneak back to the guild to make Edda a hunter.

After becoming a hunter, Edda does his share of tasks that tie between the main story, and side objectives to help him rank up. On his quest, Edda helps various people around the world, encounters the other Heroes, Tatjana, Ganz, and Paulette, helping them with issues, and also deals with a cult terrorist organization known as Truth Sword. During one of his tasks, Edda learns that Ganz along with a Deimos child has been kidnapped by the leader of Truth Sword, Zeeman, and sets out to find them. After tricking him, he and Ganz save the child and tie up Zeeman, who has unsuccessfully attempted to kill them by using a fraud gun. After which, Zeeman reveals the true leader of Truth Sword, a woman named Ursula Al Kees.

Later on, Edda and Hemo deal with a malademon found in the sewers of what was left of Romalia from Arc the Lad II, where they find Kirika attempting to use a gun that is able to exorcise. Edda claims her to be Ursula, which she angrily tells him to 'believe what he wishes to believe'. She reveals that she awoke the malademon in the attempt to test out her gun, the Stark Dispeller, which is revealed to fail after she leaves. Edda successfully exorcises the malademon, where Hemo berates Edda for believing that Kirika was innocent. Returning to Yewbell, Paulette, Maru, Ganz, Tatjana, and Edda have a discussion about Kirika, whom they truly believe to be Ursula. They come to the conclusion that the gun she has could kill anyone, and that it's urgent that they find her.

Edda begins to question his ability as a hunter, and decides to quit. However, Hemo, who believes he shouldn't, decides to do a task in his place. The task involves finding Luberus, as well as returning an exorcism manual, which is revealed to be the book Ursula had at the beginning. After having new found motivation, Edda returns to the town of Rueloon to rank up, where he finds Ganz arguing with a supervisor about visiting the continent of Aldrow. He reveals that Zeeman confessed that Ursula's last target was the Cathena Labs of Dr. Sarak, inventor of the ALD who died in an accident. Edda convinces Ganz to let him go, who agrees until he becomes a Hero ranked hunter.

After ranking up, Edda and Hemo arrive at the ruins of Cathena (which was destroyed by Lord Darkham from Twilight of the Spirits), and encounter the lab. After going through it, Edda encounters the diary of Dr. Sarak, which talks about a new form of energy known as 'Chalice', as well as the invention of ALD, his wife's death, and his estranged relationship with Ursula. After wondering what the Chalice was, Ursula comes in and explains what the Chalice was; a being created to replace the world's energy with its own bio-energy, and reveals that her father was Dr. Sarak, and that the real reason for his death was that Ursula activated the Chalice out of anger, and while trying to stop it, died.

Ursula goes after the Chalice herself to exorcise it as due to the amount of mala-energy its consumed, it became the ultimate malademon. She closes the door on Edda and telling him that she plans to make up for what he did. Seeing that he needs to stop her because the Stark Dispeller doesn't work, Edda finds security footage of Ursula inside the Chalice's room, running away after seeing that it failed. Coming out the other side, Edda finds Ursula with strange veins attached to her arm, saying that she had been hurt by the Chalice. Edda decides to defeat it himself, asking Hemo to take care of her and revealing to Ursula he was an exorcist. Encountering the Chalice, he is able to defeat it until it transforms into its true form. Ursula comes in to help Edda exorcise the Chalice, and does so successfully.

Ursula plans to kill herself in atonement for everything she's done about the malademon threat and her involvement with Truth Sword until Edda and Hemo talk her out of it, telling her to make people happy. Realizing this, she, along with Edda and Hemo laugh as they leave the lab. After leaving the building, Ursula plans to help ill people around the world, and Edda plans to continue his exorcism journey. The two part ways, Ursula declaring that 'Ursula' is dead, and that she's ready to embrace her new identity as Kirika, and Edda and Hemo ready for their next assignment.

== Reception ==
Reception

Aggregate score
Aggregator	Score
Metacritic	59/100

Review scores
Publication	Score
Electronic Gaming Monthly	5.17/10
Game Informer	5.5/10
GameSpot	5.3/10
GameSpy	3/5
GameZone	7.9/10
IGN	6.9/10
Official U.S. PlayStation Magazine	2/5
PlayStation: The Official Magazine	5.5/10
Detroit Free Press	2/4

Arc the Lad: End of Darkness was met with generally mixed reviews due to flaws in its storyline and combat system. Reviewers remarked about the weaker conflict than was in the previous game and how the storyline alters or otherwise discards significant plotlines from its predecessor. They also complained how the combat system was convoluted and had a bad control scheme, and the battle animations were long and unresponsive. Metacritic gave it a score 59 out of 100.
