= Arc the Lad Collection =

2002 video game compilation

- Developer: Working Designs
- Publisher: Working Designs
- Series: Arc the Lad
- Platform: PlayStation
- Release: NA: April 18, 2002
- Genre: Tactical role-playing
- Modes: Single-player, Multiplayer

Arc the Lad Collection is a 2002 video game compilation developed and published by Working Designs. It is the first English release of Sony Computer Entertainment's Arc the Lad RPGs for the PlayStation. Development started after the release of the original games, but the compilation was not released until 2002, extremely late into the console's lifespan.

The games form a trilogy with a continuous story throughout each. Although Arc is the main protagonist, each game features a new lead character. Arc the Lad (1995) sets the stage for the next two games and follows Arc and Kukuru as they discover a plot to restore the Dark One. Arc the Lad II (1996) introduces Elc, a young Hunter that becomes tangled in the plot and eventually joins the battle against the Dark One. Arc the Lad III (1999) features Alec, a young Hunter with a mysterious past.

Each game expands on the previous one. Arc the Lad II features a much larger and less linear world than its predecessor, and it brings back the cast of the first game in addition to having a new group of characters. Arc the Lad III features an upgraded graphics system, replacing the sprite backdrops of the first two games with three-dimensional backgrounds.

== Gameplay ==
=== Battle ===
Each game in the Arc the Lad series, up until Arc the Lad: End of Darkness, uses a turn-based-strategy battle system. Each character or enemy is assigned agility points which determines their turn order in battle. The character or enemy with the next highest agility statistic goes next and so on, until the round is finished and a new round begins. Agility can increase as a character's level rises, can be altered by equipping items, or augmented temporarily with spells and items. When it is a character's turn they may perform several actions. They may move around the battle screen, a grid with various obstacles - how far a character moves depends on their Range statistic. The Range stat is set at the beginning of the game, and cannot increase as a character levels up. It can be increased by equipping certain items and can be decreased by using spells. Characters are able to move up to an enemy by jumping over obstacles, which requires a jump statistic of one, or by jumping over allies and enemies, requiring a jump statistic of two. Once characters have an enemy in range, they can do a number of things. Characters can use a basic attack—how much damage the character's attack deals depends on their attack statistic. As a character's experience level increases so does this statistic. Further alterations to statistics are accomplished through the equipping of accessory items. Spells and items can also augment statistics temporarily.

The battle system is, however, not entirely melee-based. Each character has a plethora of abilities available, ranging from magic spells to special techniques that either deal damage to enemies, heal ally characters, or augment statistics. These abilities are selectable through the ability wheel in Arc the Lad. However, in later titles, a list interface was created for easier use. As in most RPGs, abilities and spells require MP to use. If the character does not have enough MP, certain techniques become unusable. However, MP can also be absorbed, restored and depleted using spells or items. The power of a character's spell depends on their magic statistic, and higher experience levels increase this statistic. As the magic statistic increases so will the effectiveness of characters' spells.

Other options in battle include the use of items. The range a character can throw the item depends on their throw level. As this ability increases, so does the distance the character can throw an item. Characters may also equip items during battle, or the player may check a character's status in the status menu. Once it is the enemy's turn to attack they may perform actions similar to those of the player's characters. How much damage a character takes from the enemy depends on the character's defense rating; the higher the defense, the less damage the character will receive. When the player's characters are attacked, they have a chance to counter the enemy. The chance of a successful counter increases as the character's counterattack level increases. When an enemy uses an item against a character, there is a chance the character may catch it and keep it or throw it back. This chance increases as the character's catch level increases. When a character is hit his or her HP will decrease. Once the hit points of a certain character reach zero, the character is removed from combat. No characters are permanently lost by being defeated in battle.

=== Equipment ===
Throughout the Arc the Lad series, the equipment system changes from its very simple beginnings to a full-blown equipment system in later titles. In Arc the Lad, only accessories can be equipped, and can only be chosen at the start of battle. Accessories boost statistics in various ways, and can be dropped by defeated enemies, received from opening chests in battle, received from NPCs, or found in the few explorable areas the game presents. The weapons and armor a character uses cannot be changed. Despite some accessories bearing the names of weapons or armor, such as the Phantom Set of items (gauntlet, ring, shield, and sword), there are no weapon or armor systems.

Arc the Lad II boosts the gameplay by including a revamped weapon system. Weapons, armor, items, and accessories can now be equipped on characters. Items, armor, and weapons can be bought in stores, found in battle, found in explorable areas or created in the combination shop. The combination shop requires that ingredients be brought and assembled. Each character has several types of equipable weapons. For example, Shu can equip battle shoes or fire arms such as assault rifles and shotguns. Weapons can also be improved, and can gain a +1 beside their name to indicate their increased parameters. This new equipment system also improves the battle system, as some weapons, such as guns and spears, have further range than swords and other short-range melee weapons.

Lieza, one of the principal characters in Arc the Lad II, can also tame monsters, which can sometimes use human equipment. These monsters can be used in battle as well, as party selection is variable in Arc the Lad II, based on the number of characters the player has recruited and whether certain characters are usable at particular times in the game.

A similar system is found in Arc the Lad III, but the synthesis guild replaces the combination shop, and, to many fans, the synthesis guild is far more in-depth than the combination shop. Recipes must be found by the players, unlike in Arc the Lad II where the shop would tell them exactly what to use. The monster system is limited to a card system, where monsters can be trapped in cards and later used for attacks.

=== Exploration ===
In Arc the Lad, the world is only explored in a limited capacity. The player selects an area on a world map and then proceeds through the events and battles present in that area. Sometimes after a battle is fought, the player can explore the area in a limited capacity. By contrast, Arc the Lad II has a fully explorable world. The world map is richly coloured and detailed, where characters can roam freely, instead of having a simple overhead view map. Cities and dungeons also allow the player to freely explore, though some battle maps are only for combat, and nothing else. Arc the Lad III expands even further on this concept and every place in the game is explorable on foot and can be explored during normal gameplay.

== Development ==
Early in 1997, North American fans of the series started a petition on IGN's PSX Power for a Western release of the first two games of the series. In 2000, Working Designs hinted that they would be localizing all three of the Arc games for a North American release in a bundle called Arc the Lad Collection. After a series of missed release dates, the Arc the Lad Collection was released in North America on April 18, 2002. This was the first time North American gamers were able to play the then-popular Japanese exclusive series. The collection encompasses six discs and four games: Arc the Lad, Arc the Lad II, Arc Arena: Monster Tournament, and Arc the Lad III.

The collection also features the documentary disc Making of Arc the Lad, which includes exclusive interviews with Victor Ireland, then-president of Working Designs. It comes with a leather-bound, 150-page, full-color instruction booklet. It also includes the Omake Box (pronounced "o-ma-keh," Japanese for "extra"), which features cardboard miniature standees of all 22 characters, four analog stick covers (with either Arc, Elc, Alec and the Arc the Lad emblem) and a memory card case featuring Arc's face.

== Reception ==
Reception

Aggregate scores
Aggregator	Score
GameRankings	81%
Metacritic	78/100

Review scores
Publication	Score
Electronic Gaming Monthly	5.5/10
Game Informer	8.5/10
GamePro	4/5
GameRevolution	B−
GameSpot	7.5/10
GameZone	8.5/10
IGN	8.8/10
Official U.S. PlayStation Magazine	4/5
PlayStation: The Official Magazine	8/10
RPGamer	8/10
RPGFan	90%
Silicon Mag	98%

In the United States, the game sold 51,665 units, as of 2003.

Arc the Lad Collection garnered positive reviews from critics, with aggregate scores of 81% on GameRankings and 78 out of 100 on Metacritic. Critics were quick to point out the "typical" Working Designs packaging of the series. David Smith of IGN gave the extras included with the games "two thumbs up" and wrote that the "collection does a particularly good job of accenting one of the more unusual aspects of Arc the Lad as a series, which is its continuity." In a review from Gaming-age.com, Alex Makar noted Working Designs "know how to please their fans", listing all the extras packaged with the games and admiring the fact that North American gamers were treated to the extras which only appear in Japan. Play US gave it three stars out of five and said, "Hardcore RPG fans should add another star to the score and reserve a copy immediately."
