= Legaia 2: Duel Saga =

2001 video game

- North American cover art
- Developer: Prokion (Note: Additional work by Sony Computer Entertainment Japan.)
- Publisher: Sony Computer Entertainment: NA/EU: Fresh Games
- Director: Natsumi Arisawa
- Producer: Katsuhiko Kanazawa
- Designer: Takuya Kuwazono
- Programmer: Noriyuki Watanabe
- Artist: Natsumi Arisawa
- Writer: Kazushige Inaba
- Composers: Hitoshi Sakimoto; Yasunori Mitsuda; Michiru Ōshima
- Platform: PlayStation 2
- Release: JP: November 29, 2001; NA: October 1, 2002; EU: October 11, 2002
- Genre: Role-playing
- Mode: Single-player

Legaia 2: Duel Saga, released as Legaia: Duel Saga (Note: Japanese: レガイア デュエルサーガ, Hepburn: Regaia De~yuerusāga) in Japan, is a role-playing video game developed by Prokion and published by Sony Computer Entertainment for the PlayStation 2. The sequel to Legend of Legaia, it was released in Japan in November 2001 and internationally in 2002 by Fresh Games.

== Gameplay ==
The gameplay is similar to the predecessor, with combat entering a series of "strikes" in stances akin to fighting games with combos. New features include the ability to craft equipment and camping.

== Synopsis ==
Lang is an orphaned militia swordsman living with a group of villagers. He learns about one of the group of magical outcasts called "Mystics" and their spiritual beings called "Origins". He and his allies set off to recover the trio of magical stones and return them to the world's life force source controlling the world, in order to defeat Avalon (also known as "Gold Eyes"), an isolated survivor and legendary Mystic.

== Development ==
The game was showcased at E3 2002.

== Reception ==
Reception

Aggregate scores
| Aggregator | Score |
|---|---|
| GameRankings | 70.46% |
| Metacritic | 67/100 |

The game had an average score of 70.46% at GameRankings based on 40 reviews and 67% at Metacritic for 21 reviews. Famitsu ranked it on sixth and sold 40,302 copies. It was ranked 198th by Dengeki Online and sold 53,808 copies.
