= Pale Cocoon =

2006 film by Yasuhiro Yoshiura

- Pale Cocoon DVD cover art

ペイル・コクーン (Peiru Kokūn)
- Genre: Post-apocalyptic science fiction
- Original video animation
- Directed by: Yasuhiro Yoshiura
- Produced by: Tom Nagae
- Written by: Yasuhiro Yoshiura
- Music by: Toru Okada
- Studio: Studio Rikka; Directions (production co-operation)
- Released: January 18, 2006
- Runtime: 23 minutes

Pale Cocoon (ペイル・コクーン, Peiru Kokūn) is a one-off OVA anime written and directed by Yasuhiro Yoshiura, and released on 18 January 2006.

== Overview ==
=== Setting ===
It has been many years since a group of humans retreated to an artificial colony below the planet's surface. An unspecified ecological disaster has left the surface largely uninhabitable, plagued by apparent pollution, cold from receiving little light and largely absent of signs of life. Much of recorded history before the move has been forgotten, despite the numerous advances in technology. The last remaining information lies in a vast archive of data, much of it in corrupted formats. Determined to recover this precious information, the "Archive Excavation Department" works specifically to restore as much of it as possible. Long ago, the department used to be excited and full of energy. Now, some feel that knowledge of the lost past can bring only sadness.

Ura, a particularly motivated member of the department, works long hours to recover history. Riko has lost her passion and desire to know the past. One day Ura comes across a record that, once decoded, completely changes the way he sees his world.

=== Plot ===
Humans are living in an underground colony which is the only place where they can live now. Ura, a member of "Archive Excavation Department" is a person who does his job to lengths more than required. He does extra analysis than his job of restoration of records of the lost world. He is quite intrigued by the images that he gets from the records and stores some of them, a lot with green, which he wishes was there somewhere. A co-worker of his passes the records for restoration to him and once even tells him that they should probably leave their jobs.

Riko, a member of Analysis department, spends time after her work lying at a place connecting to stairs that seem going infinitely upward in darkness. Ura meets Riko often at this place. Ura receives a record to be restored, which contains audio to his excitement. He passes a simple restored copy to Riko who says she cannot make anything out of it. Both of them see a girl sitting on stairs saying something with a book in her hands surrounded by bookshelves. Both of them think what a book is to which Riko tells him that it was way of preserving and passing information in the past. They think then the place must be a record preserving place.

Later Ura meets Riko at her usual place where she tells him that initially people used to live at the upper levels of the colony which had no maintenance or support systems. Later even when people regarded to the upper levels as inhabitable some still continued to live there and her grandmother was one of them. She used to tell her of the green lands of the world lost. She fell one day from that upper level down to the place she is laying now. Ura thinks what she might be looking to when she fell down. Riko says that the records should never have been excavated as it shows only the stupidity of humans and there is only sadness which better forgotten to which Ura says he understands and accepts what she is saying though he wishes that it was wrong. He wishes that even a small patch of place of green is existing somewhere on the surface and says maybe the world can be restored if they knew more about the world of the past.

Later Riko does not come to work for somedays. Ura's co-worker tells him that and also tells him that he is quitting from his job. At this point the record which is being completely restored is seen by Ura, where the girl Yoko Yamaguchi is singing a song with a book in her hands about hope. Ura drops a digital book (something of that kind) from the stairs to the place where Riko is lying. Riko sees the book which shows the restoring record where Yoko Yamaguchi is singing. Ura gets onto an elevator where he is shown forcing himself onto the top of an elevator using a torchlight. Riko comes to his office cube where the record is being restored and sees the video of Yoko Yamaguchi singing. The elevator breaks while moving up and stops at the top where Ura sees what seems like the bottom part of a space shuttle. The entire place is enclosed in a transparent enclosure. He is standing a little above what seems like clouds. Meanwhile, Riko sees the entire song after which the record recovery completes. After the song is a small video in which Yoko Yamaguchi addresses to viewers on Earth in a live telecast of the past. This is the part which Ura has not obviously seen. She tells them she has arrived to the first colony on Moon called the Sea of Tranquility a week before and it is much more comfortable than what she had initially imagined. When looked from there all she sees is rust colored Earth. She tells them not to lose hope for the people still waiting on the Immigration Ships. At the end of the video she tells them to pray for the mother star (referring to the Sun) to wake from her slumber and for the dawn to come again, and for the people down there, for Yoko and Pale Cocoon (referring as an analogy to the Moon). Ura looks at Earth from there which appears blue and says "It's blue", at which point the anime ends.

== Characters ==
- Ura (voiced by: Nakao Michio)

The main character of the OVA. He is a person who is completely engrossed in the archive restoration and goes beyond his own duty requirements to find to when and where a record belonged. He is passed on the records for recovery by a co-worker who is never shown, only his voice is heard when he communicates with him. To Ura the world of the past is a world that he wishes to exist somewhere unknown to man. He wishes to restore the world of the past. He constantly glares upon the pictures of green form the records excavated.

- Riko (voiced by: Minako Kawashima)

She is the second most important character as per the show and in a way as important as the character of Ura himself when it comes to the perspective of humans in that desolated world. She is a person who no longer wants the records of the past world be excavated, as it only shows the stupidity of humankind, and she thinks its better forgotten. She works in the "Analysis" department.

- Yoko Yamaguchi (voiced by: Yuka Koyama)

She is the person shown in the record recovered. The record consistes of a small song called "Hito no Hibiki" that she has sung for the agency of Cultural Affairs followed by a small talk which was actually a live recorded long ago at the time when the artificial colony was formed. This actually reveals something which no one in the colony knew, and what "Pale Cocoon" actually refers to.

- Co-worker (voiced by: Yasuhiro Yoshiura)

He is a co-worker to Ura in the Archive Excavation Department and passes records to Ura for restoration. He tells Ura that he is quitting the job when he tells him that Riko has also not been coming to work.

== Awards ==
- Best Screenplay at the 1st Sapporo International Short Film Festival and Market (SAPPORO Short Fest '06)
