= Legend of Legaia =

1998 video game

- North American cover art
- Developer: Prokion (Note: Additional work by Sony Computer Entertainment Japan.)
- Publisher: Sony Computer Entertainment
- Director: Kazuhiro Kobayashi
- Producer: Takahiro Kaneko
- Designer: Natsumi Arisawa
- Composer: Michiru Ōshima
- Platform: PlayStation
- Release: JP: October 29, 1998; NA: March 16, 1999; EU: May 27, 2000
- Genres: Adventure, Role-playing
- Mode: Single-player

Legend of Legaia (Note: Japanese: レガイア伝説, Hepburn: Regaia Densetsu) is a role-playing video game developed by Prokion and published by Sony Computer Entertainment for the PlayStation. Contrail handled the game's production. It was released in Japan in October 1998, North America in March 1999, and Europe in May 2000. A sequel, Legaia 2: Duel Saga, was released for the PlayStation 2.

== Gameplay ==
The game uses random encounter and features turn-based combat, utilizing a system called the "Tactical Arts System." When selecting the Attack command, the player customizes a sequence of attacks, which the character performs upon confirmation. When equipping a weapon, either the Left or Right attack is replaced by Arms. Players can discover powerful techniques - known as Arts - when certain commands are entered in the correct order. All arts can be chained by overlapping compatible sequences. Arts cost AP, which can be recovered by attacking, receiving damage, or using the Spirit command - which also greatly decreases received damage and allows a longer attack sequence on the next turn. Regular arts can be discovered by inputting the correct sequence with enough AP in any given battle or by talking to certain NPCs. Special arts, called Hyper Arts, require using special items called Books before being used. Characters can meet companions called the Ra-Seru, who help them capture the essence of certain enemy Serus. They can be summoned using the Ra-Seru Name command at the cost of MP. Upon acquiring Ra-Seru, the characters' Left or Right attacks are replaced by Ra-Seru, which increases in damage as the Ra-Seru levels up. The characters can use a turn to use limited battle items using the Item command to heal allies, augment battle status, or attack enemies.

== Plot ==
The game is set in a fantasy world, where humanity exists alongside strange magical creatures called Seru who aid humanity with supernatural powers, either as independent creatures or by directly attaching to a human. However, when a mysterious Mist appears the Seru become rampant, causing the collapse of civilization. Vahn, a resident of Rim Elm, is introduced on the eve of his first hunt which would lead him into the Mist covered areas outside the large wall of Rim Elm. The small village has at its center a Genesis Tree. During the evening before Vahn’s hunt, a giant Seru blows apart the wall of the village allowing the Mist and the changed Seru to attack the villagers. Vahn hears a call echoing out to him from the center of town. There, Vahn discovers a rare kind of Seru known as a Ra-Seru who’s named Meta. Meta informs Vahn that it is capable bonding with him and unlike common Seru, it is unaffected by the Mist, but that it does need to bond with Vahn to permit the awakening of the towns Genesis Tree. Once bonded the two awaken the power of the tree in the center of the village which removes the Mist and the Seru from the village. With his newfound power, he travels across the world to restore Genesis Trees and stop the Mist.

Along the way, Vahn befriends Noa, a cavegirl raised by a Ra-Seru attached to a wolf which eventually attaches itself to her. Vahn meets Gala, a monk who after finding a dead genesis tree finds a Ra-Seru egg and at another genesis tree births the Ra-Seru egg that bonds with Gala. The trio destroys the mist generator in their continent. They move to another continent and reawaken the Genesis Trees, destroy the mist generator and its defender, and come across the Juggernaut's castle. It is revealed the mist is created with Ra-Seru which is why the Ra-Seru are immune to the mist.

The trio reach the final continent and encounter several mist generators and Cort, the prince of a kingdom and Noa's brother. After destroying the mist generators, they return to Vahn's village, where Cort has fused with Juggernaut, and threatens to kill everyone and destroy the village.

The trio learns that Gala's rival Songi went to the land of Ra-Seru and is attempting to absorb and in effect kill the mother Genesis Tree. They defeat Songi, but cannot save the mother Genesis Tree, and when it dies, so will all Seru. They return to Vahn's village and defeat the fused combination of Cort and Juggernaut, causing the Ra-Seru and Seru to die and vanish, and leaving humans to fend for themselves.

== Reception ==
Reception

Aggregate score
Aggregator	Score
GameRankings	77%

Review scores
Publication	Score
AllGame	3.5/5
CNET Gamecenter	8/10
Electronic Gaming Monthly	7.875/10
Famitsu	27/40
Game Informer	8.25/10
GameFan	81%
GamePro	5/5 (Note: GamePro gave the game three 5/5 scores for graphics, control and overall fun factor, and 4.5/5 for sound.)
GameRevolution	C
GameSpot	7.3/10
IGN	7/10
Next Generation	3/5
Official U.S. PlayStation Magazine	4/5
RPGamer	(2004) 8.5/10 (2013) 3.5/5
RPGFan	80%
Common Sense Media	4/5
Dengeki PlayStation	75/100, 80/100, 75/100, 85/100

The game received favorable reviews on GameRankings. Next Generation said, "if you can deal with the trite, hackneyed story, the new fighting engine makes this worth checking out." Famitsu scored it 27 out of 40. It sold over 300,000 units by January 2002.

During the 3rd Annual Interactive Achievement Awards, the Academy of Interactive Arts & Sciences nominated Legend of Legaia for "Console Adventure/Role-Playing Game of the Year".
