= Sing a Bit of Harmony =

2021 Japanese animated film by Yasuhiro Yoshiura

- Theatrical release poster

Japanese name
- Kanji: アイの歌声を聴かせて
Transcriptions
- Revised Hepburn: Ai no Utagoe o Kikasete
- Directed by: Yasuhiro Yoshiura
- Screenplay by: Yasuhiro Yoshiura; Ichirō Ōkouchi
- Story by: Yasuhiro Yoshiura
- Starring: Tao Tsuchiya; Haruka Fukuhara; Asuka Kudo; Kazuyuki Okitsu; Mikako Komatsu; Satoshi Hino; Sayaka Ohara; Kenji Hamada; Kenjiro Tsuda; Miyu Sakihi; Kazlaser
- Music by: Ryo Takahashi
- Production company: J.C.Staff
- Distributed by: Shochiku
- Release date: October 29, 2021
- Running time: 108 minutes
- Country: Japan
- Language: Japanese

Sing a Bit of Harmony (Japanese: アイの歌声を聴かせて, Hepburn: Ai no Utagoe o Kikasete; lit. 'Let Me Hear Ai's Singing Voice') is a 2021 Japanese animated musical science fiction film, produced by J.C.Staff and directed by Yasuhiro Yoshiura. It premiered in Japan in October 2021.

== Plot ==
The film takes place in a unspecified near future in a small Japanese town, which the technology company Hoshima uses as test site for multiple AI controlled systems and robot. The story follows high school student Satomi Amano, who lives with her mother, Mitsuko Amano, a Hoshima-employed AI specialist.

After a past incident, Satomi is isolated at school, shunned by her classmates, and estranged from her childhood friend, Tо̄ma Suzaki. Her mother is preparing a secret test of a newly developed AI system, which is supposed to be indistinguishable from humans. In this test, the AI is to spend a few days in Satomi's class in a realistic looking robotic body as exchange student Shion Ashimori. Shortly after having been introduced to the class, Shion surprises everyone by recognising Satomi, asking her whether she is happy, and breaking into song.

In the following days, Shion is bent on making Satomi happy. She helps Satomi find friends, helps these friends with their own problems, and goes on to fix Satomi's relationship to Tōma, all with the power of song. Meanwhile, it becomes clear that someone mysteriously manipulates the recordings of the school's security system and Shion's telemetry results to hide Shion's unconventional behavior from Hoshima.

When the company eventually gets wind of this, Shion is violently taken in and prepared for deletion, and all the devices containing footage and memories of Shion are seized. Following the discovery that Shion is a modified AI gifted to Satomi by Tо̄ma when they were children, Satomi, Mitsuko, and her friends decide to rescue her, and break in to Hoshima. They are confronted by Hoshima's security, but Satomi and her friends take Shion to the roof of the building, where Tо̄ma links Shion to the building's antenna. Shion uploads herself to a satellite. Encouraged by Shion, who is watching over Satomi from orbit, Satomi and Tо̄ma reconcile.

== Characters ==
Shion Ashimori (芦森 詩音, Ashimori Shion) / Shion (シオン)
Voiced by: Tao Tsuchiya (Japanese); Megan Shipman (English)
Satomi Amano (天野 聡美, Amano Satomi) / Satomi (サトミ)
Voiced by: Haruka Fukuhara (Japanese); Risa Mei (English)
Tōma Suzaki (素崎 十真, Suzaki Tōma) / Tōma (トウマ)
Voiced by: Asuka Kudo (Japanese); Jordan Dash Cruz (English)
Sadayuki Gotō (後藤 定行, Gotō Sadayuki) / Gotchan (ゴッちゃん)
Voiced by: Kazuyuki Okitsu (Japanese); Ian Sinclair (English)
Aya Satō (佐藤 綾, Satō Aya) / Aya (アヤ)
Voiced by: Mikako Komatsu (Japanese); Alexis Tipton (English)
Koichiro Sugiyama (杉山 絋一郎, Sugiyama Kōichirō) / Thunder (サンダー, Sandā)
Voiced by: Satoshi Hino (Japanese); Kamen Casey (English)
Mitsuko Amano (天野 美津子)
Voiced by: Sayaka Ohara (Japanese); Laila Berzins (English)
Nomiyama (野見山)
Voiced by: Kenji Hamada (Japanese); Richard L. Olsen (English)
Saijō (西城)
Voiced by: Kenjiro Tsuda (Japanese); David Wald (English)

== Production ==
Sing a Bit of Harmony was announced by Funimation, as a co-production with J.C.Staff, on September 10, 2020. The film was directed by Yasuhiro Yoshiura. Yoshiura and Ichirō Ōkouchi co-wrote the script, Kanna Kii drew the original character designs, Shuichi Shimamura designed the characters for animation and is also the chief supervising animator, and Hidekazu Shimamura served as supervising animator. Ryo Takahashi composed the music and Yohei Matsui wrote the songs. On April 6, 2021, Funimation posted a trailer for the film.

== Release ==
Sing a Bit of Harmony premiered in Japan on October 29, 2021. The film had its international premiere on October 2, 2021, at the Scotland Loves Animation film festival, held at the Glasgow Film Theatre. Funimation screened the film, in both subbed and dubbed formats, in the United States and Canada on January 23, 25, and 26; in Australia and New Zealand starting on January 27; in the United Kingdom and Ireland starting on January 28.

== Manga adaptation ==
A manga adaptation, illustrated by Megumu Maeda, was serialized in Kodansha's seinen manga magazine Monthly Afternoon from June 24, 2021, to July 25, 2022. Kodansha compiled its chapters in three tankōbon volumes, released from October 21, 2021, to October 21, 2022.

== Reception ==
In October 2021, Sing a Bit of Harmony won the Audience Award at the Scotland Loves Animation film festival. It is also won the Best Animation Film Award at the New York City Film & Television Festival 2021, entered finalist of New York Animation Film Awards 2021 Best Animation Feature Film. In Japan, it is also nominated for the Excellent Animation of the Year in Japan Academy Film Prize 2022.
