= Aquatic Language =

2002 original video animation

水のコトバ (Mizu no Kotoba)
- Genre: SciFi, Psychological
- Original video animation
- Directed by: Yasuhiro Yoshiura
- Studio: Studio Rikka
- Released: 26 October 2002
- Runtime: 9 minutes

Aquatic Language (水のコトバ, Mizu no Kotoba) is a short nine-minute film written and directed by Yasuhiro Yoshiura. It aired 26 October 2002 in NHK BS1's, 10 min. theater slot.

== Synopsis & Style ==
Aquatic Language tries to relay to the audience the importance of language; and the need for communication. It mixes 2D and 3D visual techniques with dramatic camera movements and angles to enhance its dialogue.

== Voice cast ==
- Rina Matsufuji as Waitress
- Yasuhiro Yoshiura as Protagonist
- Mayo Saksegawa as Gossipy Girl
- Chihiro Kusano as Cool Girl
- Akihiro Yoshiura as Small Guy
- Yuusuke Sakaguchi as Big Guy
- Satoshi Watanabe as Bookworm

== Staff ==
- Writer & Director - Yasuhiro Yoshiura
- Music - Satoshi Watanabe

== Awards ==
- Excellent Work Award, Tokyo International Anime Fair, 2003.
