= Patema Inverted =

2013 film by Yasuhiro Yoshiura

- Japanese DVD cover art

サカサマのパテマ (Sakasama no Patema)
- Genre: Fantasy, science fiction
- Created by: Yasuhiro Yoshiura
- Original net animation

Patema Inverted: Beginning of the Day
- Directed by: Yasuhiro Yoshiura
- Written by: Yasuhiro Yoshiura
- Studio: Studio Rikka
- Released: February 26, 2012 – August 25, 2012
- Runtime: 6 minutes
- Episodes: 4
- Anime film
- Directed by: Yasuhiro Yoshiura
- Written by: Yasuhiro Yoshiura
- Music by: Michiru Ōshima
- Studio: Studio Rikka
- Licensed by: AUS: Hanabee; NA: Cinedigm; GKIDS; UK: Anime Limited
- Released: November 9, 2013
- Runtime: 99 minutes

Patema Inverted (サカサマのパテマ, Sakasama no Patema) is a 2013 science fiction anime film written and directed by Yasuhiro Yoshiura. It was released in Japan by Asmik Ace on November 9, 2013. A four-episode original net animation (ONA) series, Patema Inverted: Beginning of the Day, streamed in 2012. The film also premiered in the United Kingdom.

Cinedigm and GKIDS released the film on Blu-ray and DVD in North America on November 11, 2014. The film received mainly positive reviews from critics, praising its originality, characters, and plot.

== Plot ==
In 2067, scientists attempt an experiment intended to harness energy from Earth's gravity. However, the experiment fails and gravity reverses, causing nearly everyone and everything to start flying away from Earth.

Years later, Patema is a respected teenager who lives in an underground society that imposes rules to keep its members away from "danger zones" that surround the community. Inspired by her friend Lagos, who has mysteriously disappeared, Patema explores the tunnels. One day while exploring, she is startled by a figure that walks on the ceiling and falls into a shaft below.

Patema falls outside the fence bordering Aiga. Eiji, another teenager, finds her on the fence. Her gravity is inverted from his. After carrying her safely to the ground, he takes her to a nearby shed, where they learn about each other's worlds. Eiji tells Patema about his father, who supposedly fell from a flying craft while demonstrating it, inspired by what the government dubs the "Inverts".

Aiga's controlling leader, Izamura, discovers Patema's presence and orders his troops to capture her. Eiji discovers that by holding Patema, her inverted gravity makes him lighter, reducing the speed at which he falls. They evade the troops, but are soon captured. Eiji is scolded and reprimanded, while Izamura takes Patema to the Control Tower, threatening to release her into the sky. He shows her that he had captured Lagos, who has since died, and imprisons her on the top floor with an inverted weight on her ankle, with only glass separating her from the sky. Despite his racist hatred of Inverts, Izamura becomes obsessed with Patema and plans to make her his.

Eiji returns to the fence and unexpectedly finds Porta, one of Patema's friends, and is reluctantly brought to the underground. They, along with the society's Elder, devise a plan to free Patema. Eiji and Porta work together, using each other's weights to sneak into the tower by going through its abandoned basement. Eiji enters the top floor alone and frees Patema, but Izamura and numerous forces soon arrive, chasing the two to the roof. Izamura grabs Patema and orders his right-hand man, Jaku, to shoot Eiji. However, Patema jumps off Izamura and grabs Eiji, and they float off into the sky. Izamura then commands that Eiji's "death" be reported as an accident.

The unconscious Patema and Eiji awaken as they continue to fly up. As they make it through the clouds, they find that the "sky" is a mechanical ceiling that manufactures Aiga's atmosphere and projects the "stars." They discover Eiji's father's flying machine there. Eiji reads his father's notes, and discovers that he had befriended Lagos and that they both created the floating vehicle. There, Patema and Eiji profess their love, and release the inverted weights levitating the craft, allowing it to descend and float steadily back to Aiga.

Meanwhile, Jaku, suspicious of Izamura, discovers that he had Eiji's father killed and Lagos captured, specifically to prevent anyone from discovering how small Aiga is. As Izamura finds Jaku, they spot the flying machine falling back down and Izamura orders his troops to capture it. Outside, the flying machine is also witnessed by other students from Eiji's school, including Kaho, Eiji's closest classmate, who doubts that his "death" was accidental. Her doubts are confirmed when she and students notice Eiji and Patema inside the vehicle.

Eiji and Patema jump from the descending vehicle, falling into the shaft leading to Patema's society. The Inverts are glad to see the two alive. However, Izamura and Jaku pursue them in the craft, and Eiji, Patema, and Porta are taken with them as the vehicle falls, eventually crashing to the floor of the shaft. Izamura shoots and wounds Eiji, and attempts to kill Patema, but is thwarted by Porta who knocks away the gun. After drawing a knife to finish Patema, the damaged floor collapses, revealing Earth's true surface: thousands of ruined buildings and open sky, including a ring of debris around the Moon. It is revealed that Aiga and its citizens are actually those who survived the catastrophic experiment, and were living in an artificial world underground that supported their inverted gravity.

Floating upward, Izamura desperately holds onto Patema, but loses his grip when the broken craft flies up into him, sending him into the sky. Eiji jumps and grabs onto the falling Patema, and Jaku and the Elder quickly secure the two. Eiji later wakes to discover the surface world. The Elder reads the notes about his son Lagos. He, Porta, and Jaku agree that their worlds should work together now that the truth is known. Patema and Eiji hold on to each other and survey the surface.

== Voice cast ==
Major characters as listed in the closing credits:

Character	Japanese voice actor	English dubbing actor
Patema (パテマ)	Yukiyo Fujii	Cassandra Lee Morris
Eiji (エイジ, Eiji)	Nobuhiko Okamoto	Michael Sinterniklaas
Porta (ポルタ, Poruta)	Shintaro Ohata	Robbie Daymond
G (Elder) (ジィ, Ji)	Shinya Fukumatsu	Bill Lader
Lagos (ラゴス, Ragosu)	Masayuki Kato	Chris Niosi
Jaku (ジャク)	Hiroki Yasumoto	Patrick Seitz
Kaho (カホ)	Maaya Uchida	Stephanie Sheh
Izamura (イザムラ)	Takaya Hashi	Richard Epcar

== Reception ==
Patema Inverted received positive reviews. The film garnered a 79% approval rating from 14 critics with an average rating of 5.7 out of 10 on the review aggregation website Rotten Tomatoes. Metacritic provides a score of 66 out of 100 from 8 critics, which indicates "generally favorable reviews".

Jeannette Catsoulis of The New York Times called the film "delightful" while praising musical score and animation. She also compared Patema Inverted with a 2012 feature film Upside Down (which was using similar plot and main theme) but pointed out that "this 'Can we get along?' movie literalizes a physical attraction that acts as a counterargument to the divided worlds' insistence on separation". Patema Inverted was released as a web anime before Upside Down, and they did not influence each other.

The film won the Audience Award and the Judges Award at the 2013 Scotland Loves Anime. It was also nominated for the Asia Pacific Screen Award for Best Animated Film at the 7th Asia Pacific Screen Awards.

== See also ==
- Head over Heels (2012 film)
- Upside Down (2012 film)
- Relativity (M. C. Escher)
