= Time of Eve =

Japanese anime series and its franchise

- Theatrical release poster

イヴの時間 (Ivu no Jikan)
- Genre: Drama, science fiction
- Original net animation
- Directed by: Yasuhiro Yoshiura
- Produced by: Tom Nagae
- Written by: Yasuhiro Yoshiura
- Music by: Tohru Okada
- Studio: Studio Rikka
- Licensed by: NA: AnimEigo
- Released: August 1, 2008 – September 18, 2009
- Runtime: 15–27 minutes
- Episodes: 6
- Anime film

Time of Eve: The Movie
- Directed by: Yasuhiro Yoshiura
- Produced by: Tom Nagae
- Written by: Yasuhiro Yoshiura
- Music by: Tohru Okada
- Studio: Studio Rikka
- Licensed by: NA: Pied Piper (expired) AnimEigo (current)
- Released: March 6, 2010
- Runtime: 106 minutes
- icon

Time of Eve (イヴの時間, Ivu no Jikan) is a six-episode ONA anime series created by Yasuhiro Yoshiura. Produced by Studio Rikka and DIRECTIONS, Inc., the series streamed on Yahoo! Japan from August 1, 2008, to September 18, 2009, with simulcasts by Crunchyroll. A theatrical version of Time of Eve premiered in Japan on March 6, 2010.

== Plot ==
In a futuristic setting, androids have come into common usage. Rikuo Sakisaka, who has taken robots for granted for his entire life, one day discovers that Sammy, his home android, has been acting independently and coming and going on her own. He finds a strange phrase recorded in her activity log, "Are you enjoying the Time of Eve?". He, along with his friend Masakazu Masaki, trace Sammy's movements and finds an unusual cafe, "The Time of Eve". Nagi, the barista, informs them that the cafe's main rule is to not discriminate between humans and androids. Within the cafe, androids do not display their status rings, and, when patrons depart, the door is automatically locked for two minutes to prevent someone from following them to discover their true nature.

The first few episodes involve conversations between Rikuo (usually accompanied by Masaki) and the cafe regulars: the bubbly Akiko, child Chie and her elderly guardian, the lovers Koji and Rina, and others. These conversations make frequent allusion to Isaac Asimov's Three Laws of Robotics, often highlighting surprising interpretations of those laws, some of which form apparent loopholes. The overarching plot involves the beginnings of independence displayed by the androids, what they do with that independence within the bounds of the three laws, and what motivates them. Secondary plots involve the individual stories of each android the protagonists encounter in the cafe, and how they come to discover which patrons are androids and which are not.

== Characters ==
=== Main characters ===
Rikuo Sakisaka (向坂 リクオ, Sakisaka Rikuo)
Voiced by: Jun Fukuyama (Japanese); Yuri Lowenthal (English)
Rikuo is a high school student and talented pianist. After winning the grand prize at a competition where a robot was the guest pianist, he decides to give up playing, since the robot played so well he was moved by the performance. Like most people, he treats robots and androids like appliances. He becomes curious of Sammy's activities when he notices she comes and goes from the apartment at odd times. While reviewing her activity and GPS log, he finds an entry displaying, "Are you enjoying the Time of EVE?". Retracing her steps, he discovers a cafe, Time of Eve, where humans and robots are treated as equals.
Initially fearful of Sammy's independence, he learns she is more human than he first thought. This enables him to let go of his former prejudice against androids and take up the piano once more.
Masakazu Masaki (真崎 マサカズ, Masaki Masakazu)
Voiced by: Kenji Nojima, Yūko Sanpei (child) (Japanese); Michael Sinterniklaas (English)
His father consistently calls him Masakazu or Masa, although Akiko once refers to him as Masa. Everyone else simply calls him Masaki. Masaki is Rikuo's best friend and an honors student. Masaki claims not to have robots at home but in fact has a household robot designated THX, whom he calls Tex. He distrusts robots and helps Rikuo to investigate Sammy's covert activities. His distrust of robots stems from feeling betrayed by Tex as a child. Tex was Masaki's primary source of emotional support when his mother and father were separating. However, Masaki's father, an anti-robot activist, commanded the robot never to speak again. Masaki blames Tex for being undependable when he needed him the most and believes they are incapable of emotions and empathy.
At the film's conclusion, Tex was able to defend Masaki from an android sent by the Ethics Committee. At the same time, he was able to relay his true thoughts and emotions he was holding back for several years. This resulted in Masaki accepting androids once more.
Sammy (サミィ, Samii)
Voiced by: Rie Tanaka (Japanese); Elizabeth Boyle (English)
Sammy is the Sakisaka family's household android, who has the appearance of a young woman. At home, Sammy's behavior is passive and emotionless. At the Time of Eve, she refers to Rikuo, Naoko, and their parents as her family. She wishes to make the members of her family happy, but is unable to demonstrate independence, even for their benefit is unsettling to Rikuo who is the only one aware. Therefore, Sammy lies about doing anything out of the ordinary when Rikuo questions her activities.
While Sammy appears emotionless as an android, she is very insecure and afraid of hurting others, especially Rikuo. Therefore, she would do things covertly such as taking detours during her regular schedules or attempting to play the piano late at night when no one is awake.
Nagi (ナギ)
Voiced by: Rina Sato (Japanese); Stephanie Sheh (English)
Nagi is the barista at the Time of Eve. She carefully manages the coffee shop and enforces the rule there must be no discrimination between humans and robots. Nagi is occasionally unsure of how to handle some situations occur in the cafe, leaving open the question as to whether she is an android for most of the series. It is eventually revealed that she was the human child that the Ethics Committee injured in the notorious Tokisaka Incident 8 years prior to the series. She was five at the time.
After the credits, Nagi was seen entering a house (assuming hers, because she said "Tadaima", which means "I'm home" in English). She was then shown talking to Shiotsuki, her father, who was the original creator of androids. She told him he should be happy because his "children" (androids) are laughing along with humans out there, and soon it'll extend beyond the cafe.

=== Time of Eve regulars ===
Akiko (アキコ)
Voiced by: Yukana (Japanese); Cassandra Lee Morris (English)
Akiko is the first customer whom Rikuo and Masaki meet at the Time of Eve. She talks very fast, asks a lot of questions, and jokes around. While at first thought to be human, Akiko is later revealed to be an android when she goes to greet her master at Rikuo's school. Like Sammy, outside the cafe she is passive and emotionless, even to Rikuo and Masaki. Although passive to the duo, Akiko is aware of them as she is seen secretly smiling after walking past their window.
Koji (コージ, Kōji)
Voiced by: Michio Nakao (Japanese); Derek Stephen Prince (English)
Along with Rina, Koji is a customer Rikuo and Masaki formally meet after Akiko. He is a male-form android whose mistress is a woman who prefers his company instead of human men. Believing Rina is a human woman very similar to his mistress, he befriended Rina at the Time of Eve in order to learn how to be a better boyfriend to his mistress. Koji would later grow to like Rina for herself. He conceals his nature from Rina because he believes she would leave him if she were to find out he is an android.
Koji was initially thought to be a human dori-kei for almost half the film as he carries their characteristics. This was later revealed to be false which opens up the possibility love can form between androids the same way it does between humans.
Rina (リナ)
Voiced by: Miki Ito (Japanese); Lisa Ortiz (English)
Rina is a female-form android bodyguard who has been illegally modified by her former master, an unidentified VIP, to be capable of sexual activity. Her right leg was damaged during an assassination attempt on her master, at which point he abandoned her. Her leg malfunctions periodically, threatening to reveal her identity as an android. Since she's been illegally modified, she cannot go back to her manufacturer for repair without embarrassing her former master. Without a current master, she is technically on the run from the authorities. She befriends and falls in love with Koji as he is both kind and thoughtful. Rina believes Koji is human and fears he would abandon her if when he finds out she is an android.
Shimei (シメイ)
Voiced by: Motomu Kiyokawa (Japanese); George C. Cole (English)
Shimei is the foster parent of Chie. He is a prototype android designed to act in place of a human parent, undergoing a secret public test. Presumably, as an android being publicly tested in secret, he would not display a halo in public. However, he freely admits he is an android, but only when Nagi (and Chie) cannot hear him do it. Shimei has yet to reveal his nature to Chie.
Chie (チエ)
Voiced by: Miyuki Sawashiro (Japanese); Alice A. Johnson (English)
Chie is a young girl of about four years old, although her age is never revealed. She loves to steal and hide the belongings of others in order to get them to play with her. Rikuo meets her, along with Shimei, when she becomes fascinated with Rikuo's glasses and soon steals and hides them. She is fond of declaring herself to be a cat. She does not understand why Shimei leaves her in the care of others once a month for his regular maintenance check and does not even suspect he is an android.
Setoro (セトロ)
Voiced by: Tomokazu Sugita (Japanese); Patrick Seitz (English)
Setoro is a mysterious man who reads most of his time in the cafe. When Masaki tries to trail Setoro outside the cafe, Setoro easily evades him. While he initially reports to Dr. Ashimori that Masaki may be working for the Ethics Committee, he agrees they would never send such an obvious and inept agent undercover. It is unclear whether he is human or android, but outside the cafe he has no halo over his head, suggesting he is human.

=== Other characters ===
THX (テックス)
Voiced by: Mitsuki Saiga (Japanese); Casey Mongillo (English)
THX, or "TEX" is the household robot of Masaki Masakazu and his family. At first it is a mystery as to why THX remains completely silent except in cases of emergency. It is later revealed that after being overheard counseling young Masaki during his parents' breakup, THX was ordered in the sternest measure by Masaki's father to no longer speak. A strict command by a parent of a child supersedes all but danger to the child or another human. When such danger is perceived by THX several years later, it is able to warn its master of an infiltration android.
Katoran (カトラン)
Voiced by: Unsho Ishizuka (Japanese); Sean Schemmel (English)
His occupation was to look over his family's child. As an old model robot his response and speech functions are outdated, causing him to constantly question others' comments.
Naoko Sakisaka (向坂 ナオコ, Sakisaka Naoko)
Voiced by: Yuko Mizutani (Japanese); Molly Kay (English)
Rikuo's older sister and a college student. She often stays out late at night drinking and partying and is embarrassed whenever Sammy comes to pick her up. Naoko accuses Rikuo of being a dori-kei as he begins to treat Sammy more openly.
Atsuro Masaki (真崎 アツロウ, Masaki Atsurō)
Voiced by: Akio Nojima (Japanese); JB Blanc (English)
Atsuro Masaki is Masaki's father and is the Chief Information Officer of the non-governmental organization known as the Robot Ethics Committee, usually called simply the Ethics Committee, even in its own public advertisements. The Ethics Committee was once a radical anti-robot organization founded 10 years prior to the series, but was heavily censured after one of their activities harmed a human being. Since then, their activities have mostly been conducting anti-robot advertising campaigns advocating the segregation of humans and robots and encouraging the government and police to crack down on perceived violations of the Laws of Robotics. When he observed his young son and his household robot becoming friends, he ordered the robot never to speak again and told his son that it was broken.
Dr. Ashimori (芦森博士, Ashimori-hakase)
Voiced by: Yuriko Yamaguchi (Japanese); Cindy Robinson (English)
Dr. Ashimori is Setoro's supervisor, an influential person with access to protected information and is not a member of the Ethics Committee. Other than that, it is unclear what her role is, neither her motives behind sending Setoro to investigate the Time of Eve cafe.
In the film, Dr Ashimori can be seen at various times again raising her purpose. She can be seen bashing an android with a pipe, visiting the Sakisaka family and arguing with Shiotsuki.
On her desk, there is a book titled Android Promotion Committee which may be a counter force to the Ethics committee. Although it was never confirmed, the way this information was portrayed could certify that this is indeed the committee that both Dr Ashimori and Setoro are employed in.

=== Character backstory ===
Throughout the film, indirect visual hints are shown that describe the events preceding the main story. Most details are seen through Sammy's reverse chronological flashbacks and the final chronological credit montage, although some information comes from brief displays of code seen throughout the film. What follows is an unconfirmed summary of the backstory formed by piecing together these visual clues with the rest of the plot.
Shiotsuki created the initial android AI, code:life. Over time, tensions between robots and humans increased. Human anti-robot organizations were formed, including the Ethics Committee. Shiotsuki's bionic arms suggest that he was injured at some point by one of these groups. At some point, the Ethics Committee attacked Nagi and her robot in the mysterious Tokisaka Incident, causing her severe injury which includes the loss of her arms. Upon seeing what pain his robots (indirectly) caused her, Shiotsuki built her bionic limbs, seen in the final scene as subtle mechanical joints in her hand. Through the process of her rehabilitation, the two grew close. After Nagi fully recovered, she and Shiotsuki decided to do something about human and android relations, seeing how deeply this issue has affected each of them.
Shiotsuki created a café sign which broadcasts the 1138 override protocol. This protocol has higher priority than the suppressive portions of the code:life AI and allows androids to act more freely, including removal of their halos. It also attracts androids to the café sign ("Are you enjoying the Time of Eve?").The protocol is spread from robot to robot. Shiotsuki and Nagi set up different cafés in the countryside as safe spaces to allow robots and humans to come together and socialize. However, the cafés were shut down and their patrons destroyed by anti-robot mobs, forcing them to try again at a different location.
In response to these failures, Shiotsuki created the code:eve AI in an attempt to allow androids to better express their suppressed emotions and feelings. He argued with Ashimori, and future head of the pro-robot Android Promotion Committee (APC). She wouldn't allow the line between machine and human to be blurred any further, causing Shiotsuki to leave the APC. His parting gift was the first prototype code:eve android, Sammy. Dr. Ashimori is forced to destroy Sammy, but regrets it. The APC repairs Sammy and Dr. Ashimori secretly allows her to live in an APC member's (Rikuo's father) house. Nagi and Shiotsuki moved to the city and set up the current "Time of Eve" café. Current APC activity is observational. Setoro, the man in the suit at the café, reports back to Dr. Ashimori.

== Media ==
=== Anime ===
The anime, produced by Directions, Inc. and animated by Studio Rikka, is directed and composed by Yasuhiro Yoshiura, produced by Tom Nagae, music by Tohru Okada, and characters by Ryusuke Chayama. The first episode streamed on Yahoo! Japan on August 1, 2008, and ended on September 18, 2009, airing six episodes. Crunchyroll simulcasted the series shortly after the Yahoo! Japan premiere, both with English and French subtitles. DVDs of the episodes were released between January 1, 2009, and October 28, 2009, and was later released on Blu-ray on December 20, 2010. The ending theme in episode 6 is "Time of Tenderness" (やさしい時間の中で, Yasashii Jikan no Naka de), performed by Rie Tanaka, the voice actress for Sammy. The song was later released in August 2009 as a single CD. Episodes 1–6 with English subtitles were released on Blu-ray Discs from January 1, 2011. On August 3, 2024, AnimEigo announced that they have both licensed the ONA and movie and will release both versions on Blu-ray and VOD on December 10, 2024.

No.	Title	Original release date
1	"Akiko: Time of Eve" "Akiko Ivu no Jikan" (Akiko イヴの時間)	August 1, 2008
After Rikuo discovers a strange phrase in Sammy's activity log, "Are you enjoying the Time of Eve?" he goes investigating with his friend, Masaki. They arrive at a café and learn that the café's main rule is to not discriminate between humans and androids. They ponder whether they should stay when Akiko, a customer of the Time of Eve, introduces herself and the rest of the regular patrons. Masaki asks Akiko if her family has any androids. She replies yes and that she is here to socialize and understand a lot more about people's feelings even if they are androids. They both later discover at school that Akiko is actually one of the students' personal android. Rikuo returns home and notices the coffee made by Sammy tastes exactly like the same blend as the Time of Eve, and questions her about acting independently.
2	"Sammy: Companions of Eve" "Sammy Ivu no Nakama" (Sammy イヴの仲間)	October 1, 2008
Rikuo exclaims to Masaki that Sammy couldn't have acted by herself and that she denies ever going to the Time of Eve café. Masaki asks Rikou to recite the Three Laws of Robotics and concludes that there is no law about lying, they decide to go to the café again to confirm if Sammy was lying. They intend to wait for Sammy to arrive, but instead become preoccupied when Chie steals and hides Rikuo's glasses. Akiko arrives and assures Rikuo that he'll get them back eventually. Masaki later leaves to chase after Setoro while another patron talks to Nagi. Rikuo figures out that androids can lie but Shimei explains that sometime secrets are kept to protect the people most dear to them. Rikuo retrieves his glasses from Nagi and discovers the patron talking to her was Sammy, she runs out of the café and the door locks behind her. Nagi calms Rikuo down and points out that Sammy is just lonely and he should think more about her feelings and consider his options more carefully, the door unlocks and Rikuo decides not to chase after Sammy. Rikuo returns home and thanks Sammy, saying the coffee tastes great. Setoro reports to Dr. Ashimori that Rikuo could not be an Ethics Committee spy.
3	"Koji & Rina: Lovers of Eve" "Koji & Rina Ivu no Koibito" (Koji & Rina イヴの恋人)	December 1, 2008
Revolving around Android-Human relationships Nagi sets Rikuo and Misaki up with the couple Koji and Rina who are regulars in the cafe. They assume one is human and treat it as an Android-Human relationship, however as the conversation progresses a bust up between Koji and Rina occurs, Rikuo and Misaki split to console each one of them, discovering them to each be Androids engaged in a relationship, of which both Koji and Rina are unaware and assume the other to be Human.
4	"Nameless: Doll of Eve" "Nameless Ivu no Ningyō" (Nameless イヴの人形)	May 1, 2009
Finding themselves in an unusually empty cafe, an old Android walks in. Upon questioning the android they find out that its name is ****, further questioning leads them to find out that it also doesn't know the address in which it worked, nor the name of the child it was looking after. Confrontation of these issues causes a logical error and the android shuts down. Nagi concludes that it was illegally abandoned to skip on paying the return fee and all personal data was deleted to prevent anyone knowing who abandoned it, and before it shut down it wanted someone to remember its name.
5	"Chie & Shimei: Melody of Eve" "Chie & Shimei Ivu no Senritsu" (Chie & Shimei イヴの旋律)	July 1, 2009
Masaki tells Rikuo of an experimental android designed to take care of human children, which he suspects Shinmei of being. Rikuo visits the cafe alone to find that Shimei has left Chie by herself as part of a monthly obligation. Rikuo tries to press Chie to find out what it is, but Akiko stops him, and Setoro tells him that it can't be helped because humans hurt those around them. Rikuo falls asleep and wakes up to find Sammy playing a song on the cafe piano. Rikuo tells her that he stopped playing because he would've hated it if she mastered the piano. He goes on to say that he doesn't care anymore and plays. Shinmei returns and thanks Rikuo for the performance. Rikuo tells Nagi that he doesn't dislike the cafe.
6	"Masaki: Friendships of Eve" "Masaki Ivu no Kizuna" (Masaki イヴの絆)	September 18, 2009
In a flashback, Masaki's father overhears their android, THX, console Masaki about his parents' marital problems. In response, Masaki's father silences THX and lies to Masaki that he is broken. In the present, the Ethics Committee plans to crack down on places that promote improper relations between humans and androids and plan to send out undercover androids for the initial investigation. Rikuo asks Masaki to come back to the cafe again but is rejected. Masaki decides to tell his father about the cafe, but comes home to find out that THX has left by itself. He receives a call from Rikuo and finds out that THX is at the cafe, warning them about the Ethics Committee, and Masaki goes to the cafe. The undercover android sent by the Ethics Committee enters the cafe and is recognized by THX. THX, recognizing danger to Masaki, goes against its order to not speak, and confronts the android, causing it to retreat. THX tells Masaki that it always wanted to be by his side, before becoming quiet once again. We see that the investigation of the cafe is put on hold. The episode ends with a new customer (not shown) entering the cafe.

=== Theatrical film ===
A theatrical version, called Time of Eve: The Movie (イヴの時間 劇場版, Ivu no Jikan Gekijoban), premiered on March 6, 2010, at Ikebukuro Theater in Tokyo and Umeda Theater in Osaka. The theatrical release version features a new theme song called "I have a dream", composed by Yuki Kajiura and performed by the pop-group Kalafina. Special-edition DVDs were distributed with pre-sold tickets in December 2009. A DVD/BD of the movie was released in Japan on July 28, 2010. A Kickstarter fundraiser was launched on May 23, 2013, for an international Blu-ray release of the film, with a goal of $18,000. The goal was easily achieved in less than 24 hours. A stretch goal was later announced, with a goal of $50,000. This goal was also achieved after only 60 hours. The final amount raised was over $215,000, over 1000% of the original $18,000 target.

=== Other media ===
A manga adaptation of Time of Eve illustrated by Yuuki Ohta began serialization in Square Enix's manga magazine Young Gangan in its February 2010 Issue and finished in its March 2012 Issue. The manga has also been compiled into three volumes. A light novel adaptation called Time of Eve: Another Act, written by Kei Mizuichi and illustrated by character designer Ryusuke Chayama, was published on March 18, 2010, by Shogakukan under its Gagagabunko imprint. An official fanbook was released in Japan in February 2010 by Kotobukiya. Shaddy Co. Ltd. is releasing an original EVLEND coffee blend based on the blend used in series. Asmik Ace Entertainment has published an iPhone application on January 10, 2012, called Time of Eve act0X with a story feature, coffee timer, and alarm.

== Awards and festival screenings ==
Awards/honors

- New York International Children's Film Festival 2011 (NYICFF) Official Selection, New Features in Competition (Time of EVE: The Movie)
- Pusan International Film Festival 2010, Official Selection (Time of EVE: The Movie)
- 14th Japan Media Arts Festival 2010, Animation Division/Jury Recommended Work (Time of EVE: The Movie)
- New York International Children's Film Festival 2010 (NYICFF) Official Selection, Flicker Lounge Program (Act 01 Akiko)
- 2010 Tokyo International Anime Fair's 9th Tokyo Anime Award, Original Video Animation Category Excellence Award (Episodes 1–6)

Screenings

- IZANAGI - Japanese Film Festival, 2019, Romania (Time of EVE: The Movie)
- Festival Utopiales 2014, France (Time of EVE: The Movie)
- Anime Matsuri 2010, Australia (Time of EVE: The Movie)
- Japan Expo 2010 (Episodes 1–3), Japan Expo 2008 (Episode 1), France
- SCI-FI-LONDON 2009, UK (Episodes 1–6, OKTOBERFEST 2009 event)
- Camera Japan Festival, Netherlands (Episodes 1–6)
- ICon Festival 2009, Israel (Episodes 1–6)
- Future Film Festival, Italy (Episodes 1–3, non-competition special event)
- Polymanga 2009, Switzerland (Episode 1)
