= Arc the Lad =

Series of tactical role-playing games

- Genre: Tactical role-playing
- Developers: G-Craft; ARC Entertainment; TOSE; Cattle Call; AltPlus
- Publishers: Sony Computer Entertainment; Working Designs; Bandai; Namco; ForwardWorks
- Creator: Toshiro Tsuchida
- Platforms: PlayStation, WonderSwan Color, PlayStation 2, Android, iOS
- First release: Arc the Lad; June 30, 1995
- Latest release: Arc the Lad R August 25, 2018

Arc the Lad (アークザラッド, Āku za raddo) is a series of tactical role-playing games created by Toshiro Tsuchida, originally developed by G-Craft and published by Sony Interactive Entertainment. Each Arc the Lad game often features recurring characters and locations, as well as a consistent timeline. Most of the stories in the series involves a cast of characters battling against the forces of an evil organization or empire, with monsters attacking the world alongside them. The series features a similar strategy-like battle system, which all games except Arc the Lad: End of Darkness follow.

The series began with the release of Arc the Lad in 1995 exclusively for the PlayStation, followed up by a sequel a year later. Alongside seven other released games after II, the Arc the Lad series has also branched into other media such as manga, anime, and novels.

Though the series enjoyed huge success in Japan, often regarded as a staple RPG of its generation in the region, Western sales and overall knowledge of the series are low due to its obscurity. This is due to the first three Arc the Lad games not being released outside of Japan until the Arc the Lad Collection was released by Working Designs in 2002, which was followed by Twilight of the Spirits in 2003 and End of Darkness in 2005.

== Games ==
Release timeline
1995	Arc the Lad
1996	Arc the Lad II
1997	Monster Game with Casino Game
1998
1999	Arc the Lad III
2000–2001
2002	Collection
2002	Kishin Fukkatsu
2003	Twilight of the Spirits
2004	End of Darkness
2005–2017
2018	Arc the Lad R

Arc the Lad was developed by G-Craft and published by Sony Computer Entertainment in Japan on June 30, 1995. Notable for being the first game to feature an orchestral soundtrack, Arc the Lad features tactical role-playing game battle elements that combines both tactics and traditional role-playing game elements, which would become a staple for the series. In this first installment, the lead protagonist, Arc, sets off from his small town of Touvil after he learns about a plot involving the destruction of the world during his quest to discover what happened to his missing father 10 years prior to the game's events. During his travels, Arc gathers a band of six other allies: Kukuru, Poco, Gogen, Tosh, Chongara, and Iga, all of whom would go on to appear in later games.

Arc the Lad II, developed by ARC Entertainment and published by Sony Computer Entertainment, was released in Japan on November 1, 1996, and was re-released twice under Sony's 'The Best' brand. Arc the Lad II continues to use the tactical battle format seen in the previous game, this time featuring much more complex mechanics than its predecessor that include leveling systems for weapons and armor for both playable characters and enemies, a redesigned battle system, a more interactive world map including explorable towns, and a longer game length. A new feature to the game is the Hunter's Guild, which allow the player to take jobs as side quests. Also, for the first time in any game, Arc the Lad II also has the ability to transfer save data from the original Arc the Lad, allowing the player to carry the same levels they had on their party members in the original game. In this sequel, Elc, a young hunter who is the last person from a tribe of firecasters, is joined by a new cast of allies in his own quest against the evil corrupt Empire of Romalia, revealed to be the one involved with the plot to destroy the world. Harboring hatred towards Arc for most of his life due to believing he was involved in the massacre that decimated his village, Elc soon learns that he and Arc's destiny are closely intertwined, and them and their allies join forces to take down Romalia and its Four Generals together.

Arc the Lad: Monster Game with Casino Game, developed by ARC Entertainment and published by Sony Computer Entertainment, was released in Japan on July 31, 1997, and was re-released twice, first as part of Arc the Lad Collection (where it was known as Arc Arena: Monster Tournament), and again when it was released on the Japanese PlayStation Store as a PSone Classic on December 12, 2007. This spinoff for Arc the Lad II consists of the Monster Game allowing the player to raise up the stats of recruitable Monsters gathered in Arc the Lad II, as well as the stats of the playable characters by pitting them in fighting arenas, and the Casino Game, an unrelated set of gambling minigames featuring Chongara, who runs his own Casino House in the hopes of finding a gambling champion. So far, the Casino Game is the only Arc the Lad game that has yet to be translated into English.

Arc the Lad III, developed by ARC Entertainment and published by Sony Computer Entertainment, was the final Arc game for the PlayStation and was released on October 28, 1999. It was the only PlayStation Arc the Lad game to be on two discs. Similarly to the first two games, this Arc the Lad title uses tactical battles and basic RPG elements based on the one from Arc the Lad II. The explorable maps of Arc the Lad II also return. However, unlike the first two games, Arc the Lad III is strictly job-driven; with the story only progressing as the player takes and completes jobs from the Hunter's Guild. Taking place three years after Arc the Lad II, this final entry to the original PlayStation titles follows a young boy named Alec, a survivor of the Great Disaster that occurred during the ending of Arc the Lad II. After a hunter saved his life, Alec determines that he wishes to become a hunter, and once he becomes of age, he sets off from his small village with his best friend, Lutz, only to encounter a large plot involving a new, corrupt establishment known as The Academy. Like in Arc the Lad II, characters from previous games make cameo appearances and occasionally fight alongside Alec.

In the US, Working Designs published Arc the Lad I, II, III and Monster Tournament as part of a compilation of Arc games (Arc the Lad Collection) on April 18, 2002, in North America. The collection as a whole received mainly positive reception.

Arc the Lad: Kishin Fukkatsu (アークザラッド: 機神復活 (Arc the Lad: Resurrection of the Machine God) is a Wonderswan Color game developed by Bandai and released in 2002 in Japan. Set after Arc the Lad III, this game features similar combat and gameplay to the previous installments. In this spinoff, Elc returns as the main character alongside a mysterious girl named Finia, who was sent from the future to his time due to a hostile robot takeover that occurred in her time. Finia, Elc, and several of Elc's friends return once again to save humanity from the robots that have now begun to travel to the past. While this title was only released in Japan, a fan translation is currently in the works.

Arc the Lad: Twilight of the Spirits is the first PlayStation 2 game in the Arc the Lad series, and the first 3D game in the series. It was developed by Cattle Call, published by Sony Computer Entertainment and was released in Japan on March 20, 2003, and in North America on June 25 of the same year by Sony Computer Entertainment America. This was also the only Arc the Lad game to date to come out in Europe, released by Sony Computer Entertainment Europe the following year. Set 1,000 years after Arc the Lad III, Twilight of the Spirits takes place in the same world amid striving tensions between humans and a new race of humanoid monsters known as Deimos (魔族, (Mazoku, lit. Demon Clan in the original Japanese version). The game follows an intersecting storyline involving a pair of hybrid human and Deimos twins named Kharg and Darc, who set out on a journey to collect five magical stones for their own ambitions and for the future of their retrospective races, all while trying to take down the autocratic Empire of Dilzweld who longs for those very same stones and a mysterious girl who carries one of the stones. Twilight of the Spirits redos the original grid based battle system in favor of allowing characters to move freely in circular ranges across fields during combat.

Arc the Lad: End of Darkness is the second Arc the Lad game to be released on the PS2. Developed by Cattle Call and published by Sony Computer Entertainment, the game was released in Japan on November 3, 2004. Namco then published the game for its North American release. Taking place five years after Twilight of the Spirits, End of Darkness follows an exorcist named Edda who becomes a hunter and has to defeat a group of monsters called Malademons, who can only be destroyed with his exorcist powers. While previous gameplay elements such as the Hunter's Guild and Synthesis returns, this game does not follow the tactical style of the previous games, instead using action RPG based combat. This game also has the distinction of being the first crossover in the Arc the Lad series, allowing players to play as select characters from the original PlayStation trilogy, as well all playable characters from Twilight of the Spirits.

Arc the Lad R (アークザラッドR) is the latest Arc game, released on August 25, 2018, for iOS and Android in Japan, later getting a Chinese localization by Boltrend Games in 2019, with the company announcing an English localization in 2020 and released on May 11, 2021. Developed by AltPlus and published by ForwardWorks, Sony's mobile gaming division, Arc the Lad R was developed by many key members of the first two Arc the Lad games, including creator Toshiro Tsuchida, world planner Hiroshi Hayashi, character artist Ryuichi Kunisue, graphic and field artist Eiji Koyama, and composer Masahiro Andoh. It returns to the tactical grid-based gameplay of the original trilogy while including a new gacha based system to obtain characters. Taking place 10 years after the events of Arc the Lad II in a new timeline (Retconning the series after Arc the Lad II, however, characters from III appear in R), Arc the Lad R follows two new protagonists named Halt and Mizuha, who attempt to stop the Empire of Aldia from taking Mizuha for unknown purposes, as well as the Divine Beasts, monsters which threaten the world as society currently tries to rebuild from the events of the Great Disaster caused during the ending of Arc the Lad II. On April 26, 2021, it was announced that the Japanese servers for Arc the Lad R was going to be discontinued on June 30, 2021, however, existing players are still able to play the game via an offline-only update offered on the day of the server's shutdown. The English servers would later shutdown on June 14, 2022, with no offline version offered.

== Development ==
When the Arc games were originally released in Japan years before a North American release, SCEA hardly considered bringing them to the U.S., thinking that the role-playing video game market was not an important one. Working Designs, then known in the U.S. for publishing RPGs, actually tried to license Arc the Lad, but Sony of America turned them down. Years later, SCEA came under new management, and with the popularity of other RPGs like Final Fantasy VII, Working Designs was able to publish all three games at once with the Japanese release of Arc the Lad III.

Arc the Lad Collection was released in 2002 and boasted four separate games--Arc the Lad I, II, III and Monster Arena, a side-game that allows players to take captured monsters from Arc the Lad II and use them in combat. The collection also featured a making-of CD, DualShock controller thumb pads, a memory card holder, character standees, a hardcover instruction booklet, and a glossy box (omake box) to hold it all.

== Reception ==
Each of the Arc games has received decent reception. Arc the Lad Collection has an 80.77% on GameRankings. The compilation is often praised for its ambitious packaging and game content, which could last over 150 hours. When the collection was released, the first two games' graphics seemed a bit outdated, although some critics find the graphics acceptable. Critics mostly agree that the take on tactical battles was refreshing because the battles are generally fast-paced. Although the first game in the series is much shorter than the other two, it is believed to be only a prologue to the second game.

Arc the Lad: Twilight of the Spirits received similar reviews. It has a 75% on GameRankings.com. Arc the Lad: End of Darkness, the second Arc game for the PS2, is generally rated much lower than the other games, receiving a 57% on GameRankings.com.

As of 2018, the series has sold over 3.7 million copies worldwide.

== Anime ==
- Arc the Lad
- Promotional image distributed by Bee Train

アークザラッド (Ākuzaraddo)
- Genre: Action, Fantasy, Science fiction
- Anime television series
- Directed by: Itsuro Kawasaki
- Written by: Akemi Omode
- Music by: Michiru Oshima
- Studio: Bee Train
- Licensed by: NA: ADV Films
- Original network: WOWOW
- English network: NA: Anime Network
- Original run: April 5, 1999 – October 11, 1999
- Episodes: 26
- Manga

Arc the Lad 2
- Written by: Kaoru Fujinaga
- Published by: Enix
- Magazine: Monthly Shōnen Gyaguou
- Original run: June 1997 – April 1999
- Volumes: 4
- Manga

Arc the Lad 2 Honoo no Eruku
- Written by: Hideaki Nishikawa
- Published by: Enix
- Magazine: Monthly Shōnen Gangan
- Original run: 1998 – 2001
- Volumes: 10
- Light novel

Arc the Lad 2 Honoo no Eruku Sevenfold Stories
- Written by: Hideaki Nishikawa
- Published by: Enix
- Magazine: Monthly Gangan Wing
- Published: August 2000

An anime adaptation of the series titled Arc the Lad was produced by Bee Train and directed by Itsuro Kawasaki. Despite its name, it is an adaptation of Arc the Lad II instead of the original game. The series ran on Japan's WOWOW satellite network for 26 episodes from April 5, 1999, to October 11, 1999 as part of the Anime Complex omnibus series. A North American release was produced by ADV Films and aired on the Anime Network, three years before said game would be released internationally through Arc the Lad Collection.

=== Plot ===
Arc the Lad loosely follows the story of Arc the Lad II, notably introducing new characters and settings and omitting others from the original games. Like the game, the anime follows a young man named Elc, the last member of a tribe of firecasters who were all massacred by the Empire of Romaila, who secretly controls the world and produces powerful monstrous (sometimes human) creations known as Chimera. After a hunter mission that goes haywire, Elc gets caught up in a major conflict when he rescues a young female beast tamer named Lieza and her pet wolf, Paundit, not realizing that Lieza is currently being hunted by Romalia.

Simutaniously, the anime also follows Arc and his allies, who are in an ongoing war with Romalia as Kukuru attempts her best to subdue the power of darkness within the Sabatico Shrine, which Romalia seeks. At the core of the conflict is a man named Clive, who seeks a bigger interest in Lieza as its soon realized that she may be the key to get closer to the five Great Spirits of the world.

=== Voice actors ===
Character	English Voice Actor	Japanese Voice Actor
Elk	Joshua Seth	Daisuke Namikawa
Arc	Steve Cannon	Hiro Yuuki
Lieza	Dorothy Melendrez	Yui Horie
Shu	Dave Mallow	Shuichi Ikeda
Shante	Melissa Charles	Rika Sugimura
Kukuru	Wendee Lee	Yūko Mizutani
Gallarno	Anthony Mozdy	Hiroshi Iwasaki
Clive	Ethan Murray	Nobuo Tobita
Tosh	Sparky Thornton	Nobuyuki Hiyama
Chongara	Abe Lasser	Shinpaki Tsuji
Gogen	Richard Barnes	Hiroshi Naka
Poco	Mona Marshall	Wasabi Mizuta

=== Episode list ===
#	Title	Original release date
1	"The Boy with a Flame"	April 5, 1999
2	"Beginning of the Destiny"	April 12, 1999
3	"Feeling in the Rain"	April 19, 1999
4	"Pale Goddess"	April 26, 1999
5	"The Criminals"	May 3, 1999
6	"Beyond the Sound of Waves"	May 10, 1999
7	"Ancient Guardian"	May 17, 1999
8	"Runaway"	May 24, 1999
9	"Friend Who Was Left Behind"	May 31, 1999
10	"The Crusade With No Name"	June 7, 1999
11	"Lonely Brave Man"	June 14, 1999
12	"White House"	June 21, 1999
13	"Smiling Holy Mother"	June 28, 1999
14	"Shrine Maiden of the Spirit"	July 5, 1999
15	"Blaze has Stood"	July 12, 1999
16	"Reconquer"	July 19, 1999
17	"Scarlet Castle"	July 26, 1999
18	"Chimera Tower"	August 2, 1999
19	"Confrontation of Two Great Men"	August 23, 1999
20	"Meet Again"	August 30, 1999
21	"The Place Where the Truth Is"	September 6, 1999
22	"Hiding in the Shadows"	September 13, 1999
23	"Frozen Eyes"	September 20, 1999
24	"Quickening of the Darkness"	September 27, 1999
25	"Holy Arc"	October 4, 1999
26	"Shining Boy"	October 11, 1999

=== Music ===
The opening theme for the anime series was Arc the Lad Main Theme by Masahiro Andoh. Two ending themes were sung by NiNa: Happy Tomorrow (episodes 01–12, 26) and Rest in Peace (episodes 13–26).
