= Arc the Lad (video game) =

1995 video game

- Developer: G-Craft (Note: Sony Computer Entertainment Japan assisted on development.)
- Publisher: Sony Computer Entertainment
- Director: Kou Satou
- Producers: Ryoji Akagawa; Toshiro Tsuchida
- Programmers: Katsutoshi Yamamoto; Masato Shimajiri; Chikara Yanagimachi
- Artist: Ryuichi Kunisue
- Writer: Team A.T.T
- Composers: Masahiro Andoh; Hirotaka Izumi
- Series: Arc the Lad
- Platform: PlayStation
- Release: JP: June 30, 1995
- Genre: Tactical role-playing
- Mode: Single-player

Arc the Lad is a 1995 tactical role-playing video game developed by G-Craft and published by Sony Computer Entertainment for the PlayStation. Despite a heavy push for a North American release from RPG fans, the video game media, and third party publishers, Arc the Lad was never released on its own outside of Japan. However, years later it was included in the North American compilation Arc the Lad Collection.

== Gameplay ==
Arc the Lad is a tactical RPG. In battle, the player has an area where each character may move, much like Final Fantasy Tactics or Tactics Ogre. The areas the player can move to are marked by blue tiles, and when using a melee attack on an enemy, the player can attack them at any reachable side. A cursor appears above enemies which can be attacked. If the player uses magic or special abilities to attack the enemy, a red set of tiles mark the range in which the spell or attack will reach. Unlike Final Fantasy Tactics, Arc the Lad is not isometric, and all tiles are the same size and shape. Compared to most tactical RPGs, Arc the Lad has smaller battlefields and fewer characters in battle, and offers a wider selection of actions.

Outside of battle, the character must select given areas on a map to access them. For example, to reach a battlefield, dungeon, or castle, the player will be given a general world map, to which the player will pick a continent, then a map of the continent will be displayed. The player then must select a highlighted area to enter it. The game will always prompt the player to save once an area has been selected. Virtually no towns can be selected. Only dungeons, small areas, and fields may be selected.

Once a player has selected an area, the character may have the ability to explore the entire area. Many areas, however, do not allow for such freedom. Typically, the player will select an area which may trigger an event, such as dialogue or battles. Most of the plot is given through dialogue during events as there are very few non-playable characters to give information on where the player must go to.

The player can save after beating the final boss. This cleared save game data can be used to transfer characters' stats and attributes and items over to Arc the Lad II.

== Plot and setting ==
=== Story ===
The game begins with a girl named Kukuru who is a member of the Sacred Clan in Seirya (スメリア, Sumeria), a clan that protects the Flame Cion. She is sent by the mayor of her town to extinguish this flame, but once she does, a monster called an Ark Ghoul appears and Kukuru flees. Meanwhile, a boy named Arc prepares to look for his father Yoshua, who has been missing for ten years. He stumbles upon Kukuru and they both defeat the pursuing monsters. Arc makes a promise to Kukuru to reignite the flame for her, but he is quickly struck down by the powerful Ark Ghoul. As he lays defeated, Arc hears a voice call out to him. The voice is a Guardian, who revives Arc and tells him to reignite the flame. The Guardian also tells Arc that he will return here later to extinguish the flame and retrieve the Ark, a mystical box which will aid him in protecting the world; the Guardian finally adds that Arc's father made an agreement with the Guardians of the planet to protect humanity by the forecoming darkness. After hearing this, Arc reignites the fire and resealing the Ark Ghoul before it could kill Kukuru.

Days later, after hearing of Arc's abilities, the king of Seirya summons him to Palencia Castle. As Arc heads to Palencia, Kukuru decides that it is her destiny to help him. Arc explains to the king that the guardian at the mountain had granted him power. In order to see if Arc truly is blessed by the guardians, the king's minister, Andel, insisted that they test him. The two were sent to battle some monsters where the party meets Poco of the drum corps, who was the only survivor from their latest patrol. After Arc returns, the king tells him that he must seek out the Ark in order to save humankind. The king recounts how his own brother, the former king, believed this story and has disappeared to find the Ark. He then tells Arc to seek an audience with the Forest Spirit of Toyoke Forest in Millmana.

Given a ride to Millmana on the king's airship, Arc meets with the current ruler, General Yagun. The arrogant general tells them the forest has become very dangerous and that he does not believe "sniveling children" should be sent there. After passing Yagun's test (and trap) of strength, Arc and company seek out the Forest Spirit. The spirit tells them Arc's father, the crown prince of Seirya, had seen her ten years ago and vowed to protect humankind, also that Arc will be the key to saving humankind and the world. The Forest Spirit gives Arc the hero's crest before departing, saying to Arc to return home to await word from his father.

In Palencia, a warrior and former guard, Tosh, is being escorted to a prison for treason; Tosh tried to stop his fellow guards from slaughtering innocent people who were his clan. Arc prepares to report to the king regarding Millmana, but the king has grown ill. Tosh meanwhile breaks out of his cell and attacks some guards, who have transformed into monsters. Arc, Kukuru, and Poco help him, and after the battle, Tosh thanks them and leaves before more guards arrived. Arc returns to the king and with the hero's crest proves that the king's brother is Arc's father. Arc says that he must wait for correspondence from his father to seek out the rest of the Guardians, so the king tells him that he will help Arc in any way possible.

They return to Arc's house in Touvil only to find that the town has been pillaged and ruined. A courier delivers a message from Arc's father, telling him to find the book in the Ancient Monolith, which will guide him to the Guardians and their Stones. At the Monolith, an old man named Gogen appears and reveals himself to be the "book" that Arc had been told to find. Gogen is an ancient wizard who had been imprisoned in the illusion world for over 3,000 years. He tells Arc that the first Guardian is in Alatos.

The four go to the king for transportation to Alatos, and he gives them his airship, the Silver Noah. As the party heads to the Silver Noah, Tosh is mourning at his father's grave. Suddenly, Tosh's sword reveals its spirit and speaks to him. The spirit tells Tosh to accompany Arc on his quest.

The Ark speaks to the party.

In Alatos, the party meets a merchant named Chongara, who was instructed by Yoshua to guide them to the Guardian of Light. He wanted them to get him the Summon Pot in exchange for the information. After speaking with the Guardian of Light and getting the Light Stone, Gogen tells them the location of the next Guardian in Greyshinne. Before departing, Chongara boards the Silver Noah, telling Arc and company that he feels besieged to assist them in their quest.

In Greyshinne, the party heads to Amaidar Temple (ラマだ寺, Ramada Temple). The Archmonk of the temple instructs the monk, Iga, to deal with Arc. The party pleads with Iga until Gogen suggests that he and Arc duel in order to gain permission to access the mountain. After Arc wins, Iga and the party speak with the Archmonk. Kukuru senses with her magic mirror that the Archmonk is a monster, which then causes the Archmonk to flee into the fighting grounds. Arc and team give chase and defeat the Archmonk. On Mt. Amaidar, the Earth Guardian gives them the Earth Stone. When they return to the temple, Iga asks them if he may help them in their quest.

In Niedel, the party hears that a tournament is being held where the winner wins a Wind Orb. Believing this is related to the Wind Guardian, one member of the party enlists in the tournament. Once that person wins the tournament, the party discovers the winners of each tournament are later killed by the organizers so they can retain the Wind Orb. After defeating the crooked announcer, the party frees the Wind Guardian from the Wind Orb and received the Wind Stone.

The Water Guardian lies in Zariban, a desert land once fertile, but rendered arid by the over-processing of energy stones. The party meet a clansman of the Saryu Tribe who by Yoshua's request leads them to his village. The village was suddenly destroyed by an attack from Kasadoll, a general and ruler of Zariban. He is after the Water Guardian and destroyed the village as the Saryu Tribe are holding the key to entering the Water Shrine. They manage to defeat him and gain the Water Stone. From the stone, they have learned that the last guardian is in Seirya.

When the group returns to Palencia, they find a police state run by Andel. Sneaking into the castle basement, they find the Fire Guardian held captive under Andel's command for energy experimentations. They free the Fire Guardian, who after much convincing, grants them the Fire Stone. However, a dying engineer set the basement and the castle above to self-destruct. They then find the king, who is dying as Andel flees. The king tells them that Andel was sent by Romalia to gain control of Seirya so he could retrieve the Ark for Romalia's plans of world conquest. After confessing his regrets to his nephew about having stolen the crown and throne from Yoshua, the king then dies, and the group escapes on the Silver Noah before the explosion destroys the whole castle.

Andel branded Arc and friends as criminals for the king's death and the castle's destruction and puts a bounty on the party. They disguise themselves when returning to Seirya to extinguish the Flame Cion. Arc and Kukuru extinguish the flame. The Ark Ghoul reappears and flees to the Ark, and Arc and Kukuru chase after him. The other party members join them and head to Sabatico Falls. Inside Sabatico Falls, they find the Ark, which tests their power first by having them fight a doppelganger form of the party. After the Ark and the Guardians reveal that mankind's only saving grace will be their ability to love one another, Arc and Kukuru are given The Power of Bravery and Divine Power respectively.

As the party leaves, Andel appears and seizes the Ark. Arc and his party were forced to be captured as Andel revealed that he is holding Arc's people captive, including his mother. The ground soon begins to split and the falls turns into the Sabatico Shrine as it emerges up high from the ground; the group use the quake to escape Andel's guards. Gogen tells them that the shrine has appeared as the seal against the Dark One, the world's entity of darkness, grows weaker. Arc tells Kukuru to go to the Sabatico Shrine, who now has the power to strengthen the seal as the last means of protection from the Dark One. The rest of the party return to the Silver Noah to set off and Kukuru watches them as they fly away to continue their mission of saving the world.

=== Setting ===
This game was intentionally designed to be short. Therefore, in the first game, only the continents of Seirya, Millmana, Alatos, Zariban, and Niedel are accessible. In Arc the Lad II, the towns of these areas, fields, dungeons, etc. are accessible. Also, new continents are accessible in Arc the Lad II. In terms of time, the game begins 10 years after Yoshua's departure, and some years after the opening sequence in Arc the Lad II, but before the actual storyline of Arc II.

== Music ==
The orchestrated pieces were recorded by the Royal Philharmonic Orchestra. Most tracks in this game are sequenced as well, though the orchestrated pieces and the ending are streamed.

== Reception ==
Reception

Review scores
| Publication | Score |
|---|---|
| Next Generation | 4/5 |
| CD Player | 7/10 |
| Dengeki PlayStation | 75/100, 70/100, 70/100, 70/100 |
| Famicom Tsūshin | 7/10, 9/10, 8/10, 7/10 |

Arc the Lad was released on June 30, 1995 for the PlayStation in Japan. A critic for Next Generation (a USA magazine reviewing the game as an import) gave it four out of five stars, applauding its "deeply-involved storyline", highly attractive graphics, attention to detail, "grand soundtrack which rivals any big-budget Hollywood production", and the overall sense of epic importance conveyed by the game's experience.

In Japan, Arc the Lad sold 697,000 units in 1995, making it the ninth best-selling game of 1995. Its budget re-release received a "Gold Prize" from Sony in May 1998, indicating sales above 500,000 units in Japan. The game sold a total of 1,587,253 units in Japan.

== North American release ==
Despite the popularity of the game in Japan and considerable demand for a North American release, Sony Computer Entertainment of America (SCEA) opted not to localize the game. Two different third-party publishers in the USA offered to translate and publish the game, but SCEA refused to license it for a release in North America. This decision prompted a deluge of letters and emails calling for a North American release, and in early 1996 SCEA caved and announced that Arc the Lad would be released in North America in the fourth quarter of 1996. As the planned release date approached, insiders said the North American release would contain both Arc the Lad and Arc the Lad II, with an end-of-game save being used to unlock the second game. This release was later cancelled.

However, a North American localization did eventually appear as part of Arc the Lad Collection in April of 2002 for the PS1, a year and a half after the PS2's October 2000 release in North America. While the game remains mostly unchanged, the color during movie sequences was altered from 16-bit color to 24-bit color and DualShock vibration support was added. Localization changes include westernizing names; Sumeria became Seirya, Ramada became Amaidar, and Alibarsha became Zariban. The collection sold decently for the time, selling 51,665 by 2003.
