= Yasuhiro Yoshiura =

Japanese writer and director (born 1980)

- 吉浦 康裕
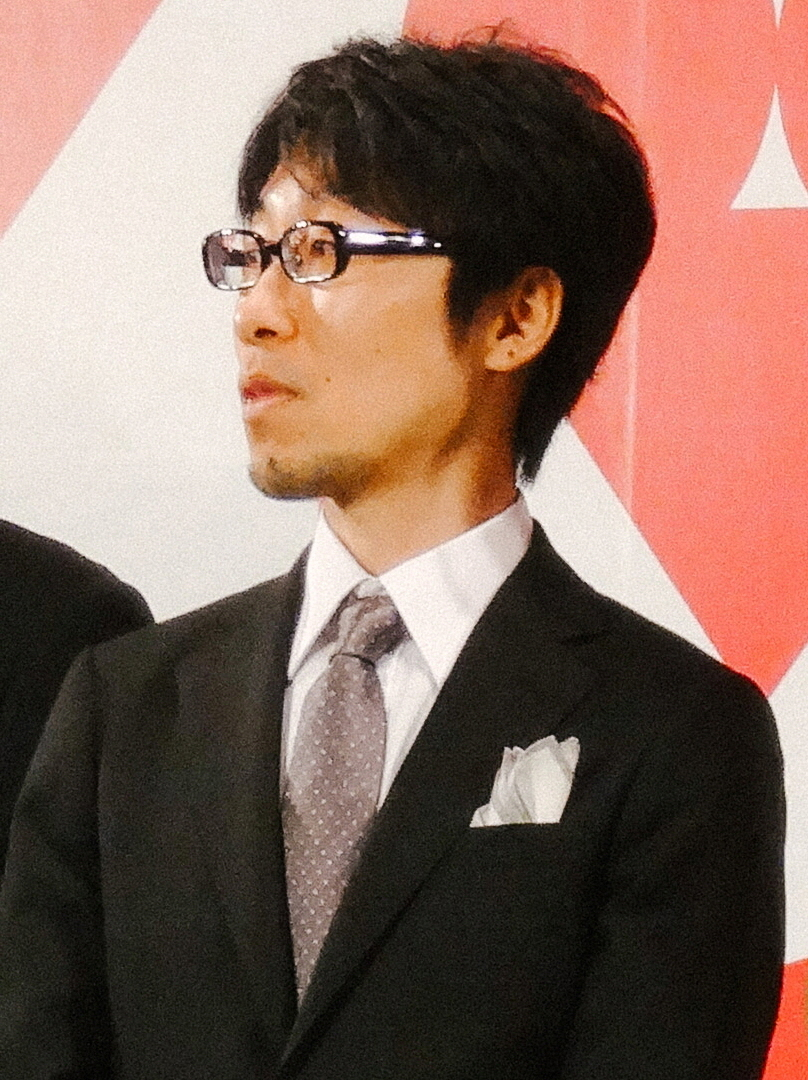
- Yoshiura at the 26th Tokyo International Film Festival
- Born: 3 April 1980 (age 46); Fukuoka, Fukuoka Prefecture, Japan
- Education: Kyushu University
- Occupations: Anime director, screenwriter
- Years active: 2001–present
- Website: studio-rikka.com

Yasuhiro Yoshiura (吉浦 康裕, Yoshiura Yasuhiro) (born 3 April 1980) is a Japanese writer and director of animated short films. Many of his works such as Pale Cocoon and Time of Eve have garnered awards and featured at film festivals. His production studio is called Studio Rikka. Yoshiura is known for maintaining a high degree of creative control over his projects, often personally handling the screenplay, cinematography, and editing. In a May 2026 interview, he explained that this "indie-style" approach allows him to ensure his original artistic vision remains intact throughout the production process. He also emphasized that his creative routine is deeply influenced by his interest in how technology integrates into daily life, which he uses to ground his science-fiction concepts in reality.

== Style and themes ==
Yoshiura focuses on creating "user-friendly" science fiction that prioritizes entertainment and universal human emotions over overt moralizing. In a May 2026 interview, he stated that his primary goal is to make stories accessible to a global audience by grounding fantastical elements in realistic, everyday settings.

== Biography ==
Yoshiura was born in Hokkaido and was raised in Fukuoka. He majored in art engineering at Kyushu University. In 2002, he released a short film called Aquatic Language which aired on NHK BS1's 10 min. theater. The film won an "Excellent Work Award" at the Tokyo International Anime Fair. In 2006, he released the direct-to-video film Pale Cocoon. After moving to Tokyo he worked on the anime web series Time of Eve which aired six episodes and later was made into a feature movie. In 2013, he released the film Patema Inverted, which won awards at Edinburgh's Scotland Loves Animation festival, and the Chicago International Film Festival. In 2014, he directed the film Harmonie, which was used for the Anime Mirai 2014 program. In 2015, his short PP33 (Power Plant No. 33) and Bureau of Proto Society were featured in the Japan Animator Expo.

== Works ==
Year	Title	Production role	Cast role	Notes	Refs
2000	Noisy Birth	Director			
2001	Kikumana	Original concept, screenwriter, sound effects, music, production		Honorary Mention, Computer Animation / Visual Effects, 2002 Prix Ars Electronica	
2002	Aquatic Language	Original concept, director, screenwriter	Protagonist	Excellent Work Award, Tokyo International Anime Fair, 2003	
2006	Pale Cocoon	Original concept, director, screenplay, production	Co-worker		
2008–10	Time of Eve	Creator, director, screenwriter		ONA and feature film (List of Awards and screenings)	
2009	Evangelion: 2.0 You Can (Not) Advance	Design works			
2010	Time of Eve Movie	Creator, director, screenwriter, sound director, storyboard artist, unit director, editor, photography, digital animation			
2010	Yozakura Quartet: Hoshi no Umi	CG directing assistance			
2012–13	Patema Inverted	Creator, director, screenwriter, design work, photography director, storyboard artist, unit director, editor		ONA Beginning of the Day and feature film	
2012	A Town Where You Live: Twilight Intersection	Chief director			
2014	Wake Up, Girls! Movie	Digital video supervisor			
2014	Harmonie	Creator, director, screenwriter, design work, photography, editor		Part of Young Animator Training Project 2013.	
2015	Power Plant No. 33	Director, writer		11th episode of the Japan Animator Expo.	
2015	Bureau of Proto Society	Director, writer		29th episode of the Japan Animator Expo.	
2016	Mobile Police Patlabor Reboot	Director, screenwriter, photography director, photography, storyboard artist, unit director, editing		Extra episode of the Japan Animator Expo.	
2017	The Dragon Dentist	Episode director			
2021	Sing a Bit of Harmony	Creator, director, screenwriter, storyboard artist, unit director		Original film.	
