= Arc the Lad III =

1999 video game

- Developer(s): Arc Entertainment (Note: Additional work by Sony Computer Entertainment Japan)
- Publisher(s): Sony Computer Entertainment
- Series: Arc the Lad
- Platform(s): PlayStation
- Release: JP: October 28, 1999
- Genre(s): Tactical role-playing
- Mode(s): Single-player

Arc the Lad III is a 1999 tactical role-playing video game developed by Arc Entertainment and published by Sony Computer Entertainment exclusively for the PlayStation. It is the third main installment in the Arc the Lad series and the first to not be developed by G-Craft, as the company was absorbed into Square after the release of Front Mission 2. It was released internationally for the first time in 2002 through Arc the Lad Collection.

== Gameplay ==
The gameplay moves away from the more tactical aspects present in its predecessors, more like that of Final Fantasy and Dragon Quest. The battles have been scaled down as well as making the party size 4 rather than 5 and the battles get a new card-based summoning system.

== Plot ==
This story starts years after the Great Disaster from Arc the Lad II, on the island of Eteru. Alec, a young man from a small farm town, Sasha Village, aspires to become a Hunter, just like the man who saved him during the Disaster. When his village is attacked by bandits, he and his friend Lutz must run to the nearest town, Itio, and hire a Hunter to save the village. On the way to, they encounter monsters and realize they get a rush when fighting, feeling a power within themselves. After the village is saved, Alec decides to leave and become a Hunter; Lutz tags along.

To become a Hunter, Alec must collect the Ghost Dream Crystal in a nearby cave. With Lutz's help, Alec finds the crystal and officially becomes a Hunter. After taking enough jobs, Alec and Lutz eventually take on a job that lets them leave Eteru Island. A boat takes them to the next continent, Forestamore. There they meet Theo, a young Cardist who can turn monsters into cards like his mother. He joins them and together they meet Lieza (from Arc the Lad II), who is now running a monster ranch with Paundit. They also encounter Sharon, a woman from the Academy, who can control monsters with a machine. With Lieza's help, the trio rides a Flying Fire to their next destination, North Sularto.

Upon landing in North Sularto, they meet a gunslinger named Cheryl. They make their way to Society Village, a town dedicated to restoring the world, and then to Gislem, a notoriously poor and dangerous city. It seems the Academy has been kidnapping people. After a failed attempt of the kidnapping of Cheryl, Cheryl joins the party.

After taking some jobs in Testa, the group meets Tosh, the protector of the city and its precious Water Orb. The Academy steals the Orb from the village and Tosh, shocked from seeing his friend Shu with the enemies, decides to join Alec and crew and get back the Orb. Because of the lack of water in the desert town of Testa, the villagers travel to Gislem, where they temporarily live.

Learning that a secret Academy base is hidden in an old airship, the group makes their way inside, only to find it crawling with enemy robots. Halfway through, the group finds Shu, who reveals that he was really trying to infiltrate the Academy. Having taken the Orb, Tosh returns to Testa and Shu joins Alec to get to the bottom of this. After defeating an Academy employee in a giant robot, Shu leaves the group.

Alec and his friends take a boat to Jiharta. They quickly learn of an uproar in the Hunter's Guild and investigate: someone has stolen a water controlling scroll from the nearby Amaidar Temple. After speaking to Iga (Arc the Lad character), the party and Marsia, a young spellcaster from the Spell Institute who knows the thief personally, discover the thief, Tikva, is working for the Academy.

Alec and his party find the Academy and Tikva at the Romastor, conducting a water controlling experiment with the scroll and some machinery. After the experiment, the Academy members dismiss Tikva, who becomes angry at not being recognized as helpful. Galdo, a spear wielding Academy member previously seen in the secret base, was watching the experiment and now intervenes. Alec and crew attack, surprising Galdo that they can even scratch him. He teleports away and Tikva is taken back to Amaidar Temple. As punishment, Iga forces him to join the temple and become a monk, much to the surprise of everyone. Marsia then decides to join Alec on his adventure.

After settling a few jobs in Jiharta, Iga then wish to deliver a letter to his friend named Leshalt in Parute. In Parute, they enter the main city, Paltos, and learn that an annual tournament's opening ceremony is commencing. The first prize of the tournament is a goddess statue with an Aura stone attached. It appears that the Academy had set a base there too, with Sharon in charge. After the opening ceremony, Alec found Leshalt and consult him about the Academy. After making a promise that he'll help in any way he can, Leshalt send the team back, only to bump into his grumpy brother, Velhart, who was the best swordsman in Parute and the second best warrior, only behind Gruga of Brakia.

After some time pass, a job order came from the committee of the tournament. It is to safeguard the prize kept inside a nobleman's house in Parute city. As predicted, the Academy did come and wish to snatch the prize. A battle ensues and Alec emerges victorious. The chairman of the committee is than Gruga himself, after taking advice from Leshalkt to keep the statue in the Rochefort's manor and had Alec's party to guard it. Not long after the incident, a job came from Leshalt in order to ask Alec to safeguard the Aura stone on the statue and keep it in the safe beneath the item society building. Then Leshalt told Alec that he might know who's the mastermind behind the academy. It appears that it was his old colleague from the time of the disaster. After Alec and his party leave the house, the Professor (leader of the academy), whose name later revealed to be Ludwig, and Sharon enter Leshalt's retreat. The professor's trying to ask Leshalt to join his cause, which he decline. He then go as far as to detain Leshalt as he would be an obstacle for his goal.

Back in the city, Alec is trying to convince Gruga to hand him the prize. But Gruga told Alec that he should win the tournament to get the prize and enlist him in the battle. Much to their surprise, Velhart - who previously said he wouldn't participate without Gruga - enters the tournament. Seeing how Velhart used to say that he won't participate without Gruga in the line makes Alec and his friend curious about the sudden change of heart. In the tournament, Alec battles a series of opponent, concluding with Velhart, eventually winning all the matches.

When the prize was about to be awarded, Velhart suddenly snatches the statue and runs away. Alec and crew pursue him, learning that Velhart has aligned himself with the academy. They follow Velhart to the academy's headquarters in Parute desert. Upon arriving, they learn that Velhart is actually trying to steal the goddess statue to save his brother Leshalt from the academy's captivity. They set to double the aura stone Velhart brought, and the process was halted by Leshalt, which causes him to be killed by Seville of the Academy. Enraged by his brother's murder, Velhart join forces with Alec to chase off the Professor only to find out he had escaped.

The aura stone is then secured and brought to the item society's safe as Leshalt wished. Moments after, the Guildmaster send a word through his manager that he wishes to meet Alec. He order Alec and his crews to find the Academy's headquarters in a place called Ragnark, which is known as Romalia till the disaster. Using the hovercraft found in the Cariote cave sealed by the guild itself, they travel to Ragnark.

As was told, Ragnark used to be the source of the Great Disaster when it was still called Romalia. Alec and his crews arrive at Ragnark and infiltrate the city of Felator in order to find clues about the headquarters. Alec sneaks into the branch building of Academy and finds out that the chief was Sharon. He overheard Sharon and Seville talking about a mysterious energy reading from what they had been researching and she require an escort to headquarter. Alec and his crew follows her through the White Bone Forest and Midoro Swamp to the main building of the Academy located north of Felator. There, they see a melting alloy gate and Marsia presumes that someone is using an unbelievably powerful ignition technology, since she herself is unable to melt an alloy that thick. They are then confronted by the guards and accidentally learned that they are not the only intruders in the facility.

As they battle their way to the top of the building where the Professor, Sharon and Seville is, they are halted by the Fear Crimson, a fusion of a dragon and machine. Seville refers that it was their crown creation and was perfected due to the help by a cardist they captured in Forestamore, which is none other than Theo's mother herself. When asked where is she, Seville implied that on the day Fear Crimson was perfected, she just died. He then lock the team in for a battle with the abominable machine. Though Alec's team emerges victorious, the Fear Crimson then set itself to self-destruct and is about to catch the team in the explosion, when Elc's timely arrival and his Flame Shield prevented that. The Professor, Lugwig and Sharon argued over whatever or not to continue with harassing the power source locked away within the lake. Elc takes Alec up to the roof where they confront the Professor and Sharon. Ludwig used Sharon as a shield against Elc so he couldn't unleash his Fire Power at him. From the roof, they witness the revival of the Sky Castle as the lake's was being vaporized.

Upon seeing the desecrated town beneath the vaporizing lake, Alec's memory recall the past where the moment he was saved by a hunter in the fire. It was in Romalia. When thinking a way to get to the Sky Castle, he spots saw the Hien by the bottom of the lake. Elc decided to stay by the Hien to start repairing the airship so it can be used to fly to the Sky Castle. Meanwhile, Elc ask Alec to report to the Guildmaster and suggest that Alec go find Gogen the magic master to find a way to re-seal the Dark One as he predicted that the Academy will at least managed to release the Dark One.

At the guild, The Guildmaster promotes Alec to a hunter of a status like Elc and Shu, which act directly under the essentials of the guild. After being promoted, Alec directs the guild to find Gogen. He is then discovered to be residing in an ancient ruin in a cape in Jiharta. After passing several riddles and tricks made by Gogen, they meet the old man himself and by their surprise, hearing him said that the Dark One can't be re-sealed, as the ark was destroyed by Andel and the lineage of Bravery and Goddess (respectively Arc and Kukuru) has expire. An idea cross by Lutz mind to create a new ark, and is heavily rejected by Gogen since it is an impossible task for men. But the team made their commitment to save the world therefore made Gogen tell them how to craft a new ark. It was told to be made of Eternal Steel, Eternal Tree, Eternal Ice and Eternal Flame. After that, one must be blessed by the guardians before the ark could be created. So the team set off to the guild master to learn the whereabouts of those four sacred relic.

The first to be found was Eternal Steel, since it is somewhere in Parute. A museum clerk points tells them about Matheus, a master swordsman of the old time. The clerk tells the team a story in which the undefeated Matheus was cheated by a fellow fighter to take the Great Mystic Sword for himself. He then point them to the old battle arena in the Digarta Wilds, to meet the Ghost of the cheating warrior, since he was unsatisfied for winning by cheating and haunts the arena with guilt and lust for power. Since Velhart is the best swordsman known in Parute, he challenged him over the Great Mystic Sword. However, the Ghost beats him almost single-handedly. After considering what lacks of Velhart, they pay Gruga a visit to consult the matter. Gruga tell Velhart that all he need to do is to change his point of view, which Velhart take as an insult. He then point Velhart to some "strong-willed" people that might help him. Starting from the arena host, that has been practicing for his ability, to Raia, the receptionist girl of the arena. Alec's team then confronted by Shante, which came all the way from Eteru isle to fetch Raia for her bar. She then ask Velhart if he has corrected his point of view. Velhart then realized that the Ghost Warrior was the same as he was being, hungry for more power and glory. After correcting his point of view and his judgment, he once again challenged the Ghost Warrior and emerged victorious. Velhart then receive fragments of Eternal Steel after laying the Warrior's spirit to rest.

The second to be found is the Eternal Tree, which is in the temple ruin where Theo receive his power as a cardist. After arriving at the temple, they are once again confronted by the spirit of Nol and confirmed that the temple did house the Eternal Tree, though only the roots remain. After they succeeded in calming the guardian of the temple with the help of Lieza, her monsters and Poco, they head into the depth of the earth to search for the relic. On their way, Theo heard a cry for help from a seedling monster and decided to help him. The monster then said that he's a part of the "Mother's Tree". With the guidance of the seedling, they reach the Eternal Tree's root only to find it was badly decomposed and was eaten by Rootybus, a centipede-like monster that has an extremely strong regenerative technique. Proving impossible to beat it in the current state, the team withdraw for the moment. While thinking of a way to stop its regenerative ability, the seedling monster asked Theo to cardish him as he says that he has the power to stop Rootybus' regenerative ability. When Theo replied that once he used his card he will die, the seedling said that he can't die, for he is eternal. Having faith to that, Theo cardished the little monster and used him at Rootybus, which caused him to change shape into a scorpion-like monster. That made his regenerative ability rendered useless and the team make a short work of it. As they wonder if the roots will be enough to use, Theo searched for the little monster and found a seed on the floor. Recalling the little monster's word, Theo hurried to the surface and planted the seed. The seed grows into a giant tree in a matter of seconds and bear fruits similar to the shape of the seedling monster. The tree shed a branch for Theo and they receive the Eternal Tree's branch at last.

The third item was the Eternal Ice, which is said to be located in Jiharta. Alec's team reach Jiharta by hovercraft and head straight to the Amaidar Temple to consult Iga concerning the matter. Iga told the youngster that the Eternal Ice might be located in a place called the Ice Gallery, where the cavern is always frozen while the rest of Jiharta is warm. The team head into the Gallery and find a solid ice-made wall at the end of gallery. Each of them try their weapons on the wall and not even a scratch was found on it. When Marsia tried her Heat Shell spell, it won't even melt. So they decided to go to the magic institute in Rushart to ask Salubari of any magic strong enough to break it. As they turn their back, a pair of glowing red eyes was seen to watch them from behind the ice wall. At the institute, Salubari told them that their only chance was the Giga Plasma spell, the strongest spell known to the magic masters. In order to master the spell, one must have the essence of all the elements and beat the elemental wizards. Feeling unconfident of herself, Marsia decided to ask Sania (from Arc the Lad II) in Paysus city to replace her in learning Giga Plasma. When they set to find Master Harzan of Amaidar who knows about the location of Light and Dark wizard, they was told by Tikva that he is training on top of Mount Amaidar. But in fact, The Light and Dark wizard was actually one wizard with mastery of both elements and has died for sometimes without a successor. Tikva set to be the wizard with the help of Harzan and Iga, as he has the potential to be one. This makes Marsia realize how many people are willing to sacrifice for her and decided to face the wizards herself. At the institute, the elemental wizards have been assembled by Salubari takes Marsia's challenge by full force and eventually beaten by Marsia. As they leave the room, Tikva stormed in and ask Marsia for an immediate battle, which Marsia won over. After beating all the elemental wizards, Marsia receive the Giga Plasma as her new collection of spells, and use it to destroy the Ice Wall. But by destroying the Ice wall, they released an ancient creature guarding the Gallery known as the Cliff Giant. Capable of creating ice golems and summoning massive tornadoes makes this beast a hard-to-beat opponent. After settling the business, they took a shard of Eternal Ice and depart to find the final piece of relic.

The final piece of material, the Eternal Flame was located somewhere on North Sularto, but the guild doesn't know its exact location. The guild suggest that Chongara, an amnesiac merchant, knows its location. In an attempt to cure his amnesia, Marsia uses her Land Ax spell to cause a shock to his head, which restores his memory. According to Chongara, the smoking volcano cave on North Sularto is the house of the flame that never sleeps. When they reach the heart of the mountain, they found the Eternal flame on top of a mini volcano with unstable reaction that could cause it to erupt and spew hot magma any time. Cheryl had an idea of making a lava-hardening gun from the weapon society and something to house the flame to transport. When they arrive at the item society, it appears that the mysterious object they found on Forestamore has been fixed and given a propeller and a handle so it could carry at least one person. That solves the problem of how they would cross the lake of fire surrounding the flame. Meanwhile, as Elnan of the item society works on something to carry the flame, Alec's teams go on a search of a missing material needed to build the gun for hardening lava. They found out that Gudan of Gislem know the location of it and set to find him in danger dome. Alec agreed to give all his money and items as long as Gudan is willing to tell him where the material is. This makes Gudan wonders about the action and he presume that the second of the Great Disaster might happen if they didn't get the calm nut, so he give the information for free. They head to Kutao temple in search of the calm nut and found some monsters was holding it. After making short work of them, they return to the society village to collect their items of need and head to the lake of fire. Upon reaching the shore of the lake, as Lutz uncover the flying object he receive from Elnan, it turns out that the object was actually Diekbeck (what remained of him after the disaster). He agrees to help the young ones to save the world. After crossing the lake, Lutz climb the volcano as Cheryl use the Stone gun to temporary freeze the lava to protect Lutz. After getting the flame, a sudden eruption throw Lutz off the ledge and landed hard in front of his friends. Cheryl cry over him and pleaded him not to die, only to find that he was joking on them. When they were leaving, Lutz try to find Diekbeck and find him on the lava, unable to move. He told him that he was happy to help their cause and ask them to protect the world, but not before he gave them a monster card of himself and christen them "The Brave Ones".

Back at the guildmaster's office, the team was thinking to go and find Gogen and ask him the whereabouts of the guardians when suddenly Gogen himself appears before them. He told them that the guardians now resides upon a massive structure called the Ghost Dream Crystal in Eteru Isle. So, the team move to Eteru and once again head into the Trial Cave. At the crystal, a voice was heard that the one was going to talk to the guardians must leave their earthly body behind, with no guarantee to be able to return safely. Alec's boldness and kindness makes him step forward and stun his friends to the ground so they won't be able to stop him from going. After leaving his body and enter the Crystal Chamber, he was greeted by Arc and Kukuru, telling him that they had been watching his journey since he got his hunter's crest. The guardians then shows themselves before Alec and give him their blessing to create the ark. After several calls from his friends, Alec then returned to the material world and told his friends to lay the material in a line. Together, they watch anxiously as the new ark was magically created before their eyes.

Taking the new ark, they all return to the Guildmaster's office and prepare themselves for the final battle. The guild itself has received word from Elc that he has finished reassembling the Hien back and it is now ready to fly. Alec and Elc reach the sky castle. After fighting through the castle, they eventually defeat Seville and Galdo. As they reach the professor, he arrogantly shrugged off everyone's warnings and eventually releases the Dark One. The group used the new Ark against it but nothing happened. A joint effort by Sharon, a redeeming Lugwig and Elc pushes back the Dark One from escaping, leaving the remaining group to fight. After a fierce fight, the Dark One tries to tempt the group by offering its power to restore the world. None of them took its offer; they had resolved that they can rebuild their world by their own means and with that, the new Ark began to activate. Realizing what caused this and focusing on the good, the heroes managed to seal it in the new Ark once and for all.

In the aftermath, Lugwig acknowledges his flawed direction with the Academy; Sharon offered to help Lugwig make amends for the harm he caused. Each member of the group goes off to resume their lives: Anriette (if you take on a series of jobs related to her) returns home and now enjoys being more independent. Velhart visits his brother's grave, stating that the threat is over. Marisa returns to the Spell Institute and become a teacher. Theo goes to Lieza's ranch to work with the monsters there. Cheryl visits the new Eternal Tree, thinking about the hope of a new life in a new world. Alec and Lutz return home to Sasha Village as heroes.

== Reception ==
An RPGFan review criticises this game as being the "weakest Arc The Lad game yet". It says that the game lacks a good plot, the gameplay is too slow and drawn out, and the soundtrack of the game being lackluster.

== Other websites ==
- Arc the Lad III at MobyGames
