= Arc the Lad II =

1995 tactical role-playing video game

- Developer: G-Craft (Note: Japan Studio assisted on development.)
- Publisher: Sony Computer Entertainment
- Series: Arc the Lad
- Platform: PlayStation
- Release: JP: November 1, 1996
- Genre: Tactical role-playing
- Mode: Single-player

Arc the Lad II (Note: Japanese: アークザラッドII, Hepburn: Āku za Raddo II) is a tactical role-playing video game developed by G-Craft and published by Sony Computer Entertainment for the PlayStation. The second installment in the Arc the Lad series, it was only released in Japan individually, though it was localized and released internationally alongside its predecessor and sequel in Working Designs' Arc the Lad Collection.

The story continues from the first game, although the focus shifts from Arc to Elc. It expands from the gameplay of the first installment, with a larger world and a more diverse cast. An anime series was made based on this game.

== Gameplay ==
Unlike the original game, the countries of the world can be viewed in detail on a bird's eye scale. Most travel is initially restricted to the game's plot, but players eventually gain global access by airship, either by the Hein or the Silver Noah. Players are no longer under restricted turn-based movement while going through dungeon/field areas. The battles vary from random encounters to automatic entries to a section.

Just as in the first game, the characters do battle against monsters and enemies in strategy-based combat. However, rather than fighting with every party member in each battle, the player now has to select between 1 and 6 characters per battle, depending on the battle's requirements. The player can recruit monsters into the party with the option of upgrading them and other characters at a later time.

In most cities in Arc the Lad II, there are hunter guilds where the player can take on local jobs. These jobs include fetch quests, monster hunting and deliveries. Most jobs include a degree of battle. Also in the guilds are bulletins about rare marked monsters that can be found in certain dungeon/field areas. Some jobs only become available after completing related jobs or certain plot points.

== Reception ==
Reception

Aggregate score
Aggregator	Score
GameRankings	81%

Review scores
Publication	Score
Famitsu	7/10, 8/10, 7/10, 7/10
IGN	8.8/10
RPGamer	9/10
RPGFan	88%
Dengeki PlayStation	85/100, 80/100, 90/100, 90/100

In Japan, the game sold 316,225 in its first week, and became the seventh best-selling video game of 1996 in Japan with 818,000 sales. It went on to sell 1,183,995 copies in Japan as of August 1997, making it the third best-selling game during the period between September 1996 and August 1997 (below Final Fantasy VII and Derby Stallion).

The game received positive reviews. Critics cited Arc the Lad II as the best of the original trilogy. David Smith of IGN praised the game's expansion over the first game, writing that "Arc II grafts a bigger world map, more detailed dungeons, more complex character development, a far larger cast, and most of all a longer quest onto a combat system that remains pretty familiar." Alex Makar of Gaming Age noted that the addition of the Hunter's Guild to the gameplay added an element of nonlinearity, allowing the player to complete many side-quests (or "jobs") and giving "the player a lot of flexibility in how they want to progress through the storyline." He also commented on the cast, saying that the characters were more likeable and had more personality, and that the "story is also a lot darker than it is in Arc 1, and has some pretty angst and melancholy ridden overtones."

Smith's major complaint with the game was its graphical representation, saying that the game looks almost identical to the first game. In contrast, Bethany Massimilla of Cnet.com called the character sprites "more vibrantly colored and better detailed", although she admitted that the "dungeons remain largely monotonous".
