= Uncharted: The Nathan Drake Collection =

2015 video game

- Developer: Bluepoint Games (Note: Original games developed by Naughty Dog)
- Publisher: Sony Computer Entertainment
- Series: Uncharted
- Platform: PlayStation 4
- Release: PAL: October 7, 2015; NA/UK: October 9, 2015
- Genres: Action-adventure, third-person shooter
- Mode: Single-player

Uncharted: The Nathan Drake Collection is a 2015 video game compilation developed by Bluepoint Games and published by Sony Computer Entertainment. It includes remastered versions of the first three main games in Naughty Dog's Uncharted series: Uncharted: Drake's Fortune (2007), Uncharted 2: Among Thieves (2009) and Uncharted 3: Drake's Deception (2011). The Nathan Drake Collection was released in October 2015 exclusively for PlayStation 4. Players control Nathan Drake, a treasure hunter who travels the world to uncover various historical mysteries.

Development of The Nathan Drake Collection began in 2014, and required the largest team ever assembled by Bluepoint. To take advantage of the greater capabilities of the console, Bluepoint were able to remodel elements of the gameplay, including the shooting and grenade mechanics, some controls, and the camera schemes. In-game cutscenes were overhauled to improve lighting, visuals, and character models, while online leaderboards and motion blur were introduced. The Nathan Drake Collection only contains the single-player story modes, with all multiplayer content absent.

Uncharted: The Nathan Drake Collection received generally favorable reviews from critics, with praise for its updates and improvements to the games, namely the graphics, controls, and visuals, and was deemed a worthy remaster of the original trilogy. There was some criticism for its aforementioned omission of multiplayer and lack of additional features.

== Gameplay ==
The Nathan Drake Collection includes the single player campaigns of the first three mainline titles in the Uncharted series: Uncharted: Drake's Fortune, Uncharted 2: Among Thieves and Uncharted 3: Drake's Deception. Played from a third-person perspective, they are action-adventure video games with platforming elements. In these games, the player assumes control of treasure hunter Nathan Drake, and must explore dangerous ruins, defeat enemies using various firearms and solve various puzzles. All three remastered games run in 1080p resolution at 60 frames per second, while the music was enhanced to support surround sound systems.

Bluepoint attempted to unify the gameplay across all three games. To achieve this, it overhauled the aim assist system and grenade gameplay from Drake's Fortune to match that of the other games, and altered Uncharted 3's camera movement. The team also remapped buttons to ensure that the control schemes across the three games are consistent. The aiming mechanics across all three games were improved. The game also features graphical improvements, with Bluepoint re-rendering the cutscenes, enhancing the lighting and the visual effects, making the models and textures more detailed, and incorporating ambient occlusion and motion blur, both of which were not supported in the original games. The team added friends leaderboards, new difficulty settings, trophies and a photo mode into the game, though the multiplayer components in both Uncharted 2 and Uncharted 3 were not included in the package.

== Development ==
While the three original games were produced by Naughty Dog, the remaster games were developed by Bluepoint Games, who had previously worked with Sony on God of War Collection and The Ico & Shadow of the Colossus Collection. Naughty Dog wanted to bring the Uncharted games, which were originally developed for the PlayStation 3, to its successor, the PlayStation 4, following the success of The Last of Us Remastered (2014). According to the studio, about 80% of the PS4 owners at that time had never played an Uncharted game before. The team originally considered remastering Uncharted: Golden Abyss, a spin-off of the franchise developed by Bend Studio, but the plan was scrapped as the team felt that the story from Golden Abyss was too tangential and strayed too far from the narrative arc established by the trilogy. The multiplayer modes from Uncharted 2 and Uncharted 3 were not remastered because Naughty Dog felt that its inclusion in the collection could potentially divide the PS3 community who were still playing the game at that time.

According to Bluepoint's CTO Marco Thrush, the studio began working on The Nathan Drake Collection in June 2014 when The Last of Us Remastered shipped. Development for the collection took 15 months, and became one of Bluepoint's largest projects since its establishment. During the peak of the game's development, the team had 48 people, including 13 engineers and 17 artists. Bluepoint designed the gameplay adjustments, and met with design leads from Sony and Naughty Dog for feedback and guidance. The team first ported Uncharted 2 to the PS4, and then Uncharted 1 and Uncharted 3 in succession. During the improvement phase of development, the team likewise started with both Uncharted 2 and then switched to Uncharted 1 once work on the second game was finished, while the production of Uncharted 3's remaster ran parallel to its predecessors. The team adjusted the gameplay for Uncharted 1 and Uncharted 3 in order to align with Uncharted 2's. The first Uncharted required the most work as it was the oldest game in the series. According to Thrush, "almost every system in U1 was touched" and that it "needed the most love to get it to the state of "how you remember it" from the PS3 days".

Uncharted: The Nathan Drake Collection was announced by Sony on June 4, 2015. It was released for the PlayStation 4 on October 7 in the same year in Europe, Australia and New Zealand, and October 9 in Ireland, the UK, the US. Players who purchased The Nathan Drake Collection would gain access to the multiplayer beta for Uncharted 4: A Thief's End. Sony released the three games individually in Europe on November 16, 2016. The collection was released as a free title for PlayStation Plus subscribers for the month of January 2020. Sony later announced that as a part of its Play at Home initiative that Uncharted: The Nathan Drake Collection would be free for all users to purchase from April 15 - May 5, 2020.

== Reception ==
=== Critical response ===
Reception

Aggregate score
Aggregator	Score
Metacritic	86/100

Review scores
Publication	Score
GameSpot	8/10
GamesRadar+	4/5
IGN	9/10
VentureBeat	88/100
VideoGamer.com	7/10

Uncharted: The Nathan Drake Collection received "generally favorable reviews" upon release, according to review aggregator website Metacritic.

Critics believed that the compilation was a worthy remaster of the three games and praised Bluepoint for introducing the graphical updates. Sam Byford from The Verge described the collection as a "perfect primer" and an excellent entry point for players who have not played any Uncharted games in the past, and the "perfect way to get yourself up to speed before Uncharted 4: A Thief’s End drops next year". Uncharted 2 remained the highlight game in the trilogy, with critics praising its pacing and attention to detail, while Uncharted 3 was lauded for its spectacle and cinematography. However, Uncharted 1's remaster received a mixed reception as many critics wrote that despite the graphical enhancements, the design of the base game did not live up to modern industry standards. Many critics considered the omission of multiplayer and behind-the-scenes videos as well as the lack of extra content as missed opportunities.

=== Sales ===
The Nathan Drake Collection was the ninth best-selling retail game in the United States in October 2015. It was the second best-selling retail game in the United Kingdom during its release week, only behind FIFA 16. It was the eighth largest launch for a PS4 game at that time. As of March 21, 2019 the game has sold 5.7 million copies
