= Shadow of the Colossus (2018 video game) =

2018 video game

- Developer: Bluepoint Games (Note: Japan Studio assisted with development. Original game developed by Team Ico.)
- Publisher: Sony Interactive Entertainment
- Designers: Daryl Allison; Howard Tang; Randall W. Lowe; Steven Schaefer
- Composer: Kow Otani
- Platform: PlayStation 4
- Release: NA: February 6, 2018; PAL: February 7, 2018; AU: February 7, 2018; JP: February 8, 2018
- Genres: Action-adventure, puzzle
- Mode: Single-player

Shadow of the Colossus is a 2018 action-adventure game developed by Bluepoint Games and published by Sony Interactive Entertainment for the PlayStation 4. It is a remake of the original game developed by Team Ico and released in 2005 for the PlayStation 2. The remake's development was led by Bluepoint, who developed the earlier PlayStation 3 remaster, with assistance from Japan Studio. The developers remade the visuals from the ground up using ultra-high definition art assets, while retaining the same gameplay from the original title aside from the introduction of a new control scheme. The game received critical acclaim.

== Gameplay ==
The gameplay is nearly identical to the original version of the game, aside from reworked controls. Progression through Shadow of the Colossus occurs in cycles. The player begins at the central point of the game's landscape, the Forbidden Lands, seeks out and defeats a colossus, and is returned to the central point to repeat the process. Most colossi are located in remote areas, such as atop cliffs or within ancient structures.

However, unique to this remake are collectible gold coins, of which there are 79 throughout the world. They are referenced in the end credits when giving special thanks to Nomad Colossus (A YouTuber dedicated to covering the technical secrets, cut content, and development of the original game) with the message, "Nomad Colossus and the 79 Steps to Enlightenment". When all of them are found, the player can unlock a new sword.

Players are able to choose from several options when playing. On a standard PlayStation 4, the game runs at a 1080p resolution at 30 frames per second. On a PlayStation 4 Pro, the game can run either at a 1440p resolution (upscaled to 4K) at 30 frames per second, or at a 1080p resolution at 60 frames per second.

== Development ==
Sony announced a remake of Shadow of the Colossus for the PlayStation 4 during their Electronic Entertainment Expo 2017 press conference. The remake was led by Bluepoint, who had developed the earlier PlayStation 3 remaster.

The idea for a remake came up after Bluepoint developers had discussed a desire to create a new definitive version of the original game. After speaking with friends at Sony Japan, it was agreed upon. Bluepoint producer Randall Lowe and technical director Peter Dalton stated in an interview with Game Informer that the original Shadow of the Colossus was on many of their employees' Top 5 of all-time list.

The developers remade all the game's assets from the ground up, but the game retains the same gameplay from the original title along with the introduction of a new control scheme. The game uses the original codebase from the PlayStation 2 game. The art staff used the PlayStation 2 version to create parity with the PlayStation 4 version.

The game was released on February 6, 2018, in North America; February 7 in Europe, Australia, and New Zealand; and February 8 in Japan.

== Reception ==
Reception

Aggregate score
Aggregator	Score
Metacritic	91/100

Review scores
Publication	Score
Destructoid	10/10
Electronic Gaming Monthly	8.5/10
Famitsu	35/40
Game Informer	9/10
GameRevolution	4.5/5
GameSpot	9/10
GamesRadar+	4/5
IGN	9.7/10
Polygon	9.5/10

Shadow of the Colossus received "universal acclaim", according to review aggregator website Metacritic.

Brett Makedonski of Destructoid stated that "Nothing in this entire game is forgettable. For a game predicated on methodically finding and exposing these creatures' weak points, you'd be hard-pressed to find a weak point throughout the entire experience."

Nick Plessas of EGMNow said that "Remakes can seem like the low-hanging fruit of game development, but Bluepoint does Shadow of the Colossus justice with an evolution of the classic game that improves the overall experience while maintaining its familiar spirit."

Tom Hurley from GamesRadar+ called it "both a great remaster and an enjoyable 'new' game in its own right that takes you on a journey in a way few things can."

Marty Sliva's of IGN summarized Shadow of the Colossus as "a stunning return to the classic that wowed us in 2005."

The game was nominated for "PlayStation Game of the Year" at the Golden Joystick Awards, and won the Freedom Tower Award for Best Remake at the New York Game Awards. In addition, it won the award for "Game, Classic Revival" at the National Academy of Video Game Trade Reviewers Awards, whereas its other nomination was for "Art Direction, Fantasy".

=== Sales ===
In the week of its launch, Shadow of the Colossus sold 73% higher than the original game. The game also was the top selling game in the U.K for that week.

It sold 21,900 copies on PlayStation 4 within its first week on sale in Japan, which placed it at number 5 on the all format sales chart.
