= Bluepoint Games =

American video game developer

Bluepoint Games Inc.
- Type: Subsidiary
- Industry: Video games
- Founded: 2006; 20 years ago
- Founders: Andy O'Neil; Marco Thrush
- Defunct: March 2026
- Headquarters: Austin, Texas, US
- Key people: Marco Thrush (president)
- Products: Uncharted: The Nathan Drake Collection; Shadow of the Colossus; Demon's Souls
- Number of employees: ≈70 (2026)
- Parent: PlayStation Studios (2021–2026)
- Website: bluepointgames.com – Archived 2026-03-27 at the Wayback Machine

Bluepoint Games Inc. was an American video game developer based in Austin, Texas. Founded in 2006 by Andy O'Neil and Marco Thrush, the studio is known for video game remasters and remakes, such as Uncharted: The Nathan Drake Collection (2015), Shadow of the Colossus (2018), and Demon's Souls (2020). Sony Interactive Entertainment acquired the company in September 2021, making it a first-party developer for PlayStation Studios. On February 19, 2026, Sony announced that it would shut down Bluepoint Games in March.

== History ==
Bluepoint Games was founded in 2006 by Andy O'Neil and Marco Thrush, former Retro Studios employees who had worked on Metroid Prime. The studio's first title, Blast Factor, was released later that year. In August 2009, Sony Computer Entertainment announced that Bluepoint would be developing the remastered versions of God of War and God of War II as God of War Collection, available on the PlayStation 3. The studio's remasters of Ico and Shadow of the Colossus as The Ico & Shadow of the Colossus Collection for the PlayStation 3 were released in September 2011. The studio also handled the remastered HD versions of Metal Gear Solid 2: Substance and Metal Gear Solid 3: Subsistence included in the Metal Gear Solid HD Collection, which was released on November 8, 2011.

Bluepoint collaborated with SuperBot Entertainment to develop PlayStation All-Stars Battle Royale (2012), which was built on Bluepoint's proprietary engine. Bluepoint also ported the game to the PlayStation Vita. The studio collaborated with Santa Monica Studio to port Flower to the PlayStation 4 and PlayStation Vita in 2013, as well as with Respawn Entertainment to develop the Xbox 360 version of Titanfall (2014). Following Titanfall, Bluepoint remastered the three PlayStation 3 titles in the Uncharted franchise to the PlayStation 4 as Uncharted: The Nathan Drake Collection, as well as Gravity Rush Remastered, which was released in Japan at the end of 2015 and internationally in early 2016.

In 2018, Bluepoint remade Shadow of the Colossus for the PlayStation 4. The following year, co-founder O'Neil died at age 47 in June 2019. By August 2019, the studio had hired several other former Retro Studios staff. Notable hires include designer Kynan Pearson in July 2013 and artist Elben Schafers in 2014. In June 2020, Bluepoint developed a remake of Demon's Souls, released as a launch title for the PlayStation 5 in November 2020 and received universal acclaim from critics.

Sony Interactive Entertainment (SIE) acquired Bluepoint on September 30, 2021, making it part of PlayStation Studios. SIE had previously leaked its intent to buy the studio in June that year. At the time, Bluepoint and its roughly 70 employees were working on original content. In January 2025, Sony confirmed that it had cancelled a live service God of War game that had been in development at Bluepoint Games. On February 19, 2026, Sony Interactive Entertainment announced that it would shut down Bluepoint Games in March 2026, following an internal business review.

== Games developed ==
Year	Title	Platform(s)	Publisher(s)	Ref(s).
2006	Blast Factor	PlayStation 3	Sony Computer Entertainment	
2009	God of War Collection	PlayStation 3	Sony Computer Entertainment	
2011	The Ico & Shadow of the Colossus Collection	PlayStation 3	Sony Computer Entertainment	
2011	Metal Gear Solid HD Collection	PlayStation 3, Xbox 360	Konami	
2015	Uncharted: The Nathan Drake Collection	PlayStation 4	Sony Computer Entertainment	
2015	Gravity Rush Remastered	PlayStation 4	Sony Computer Entertainment	
2018	Shadow of the Colossus	PlayStation 4	Sony Interactive Entertainment	
2020	Demon's Souls	PlayStation 5	Sony Interactive Entertainment	

=== Support ===
Year	Title	Platform(s)	Publisher(s)	Note(s)	Ref(s).
2012	PlayStation All-Stars Battle Royale	PlayStation Vita	Sony Computer Entertainment	PlayStation Vita port	
2013	Flower	PlayStation 4, PlayStation Vita	Sony Computer Entertainment	PlayStation 4 & PlayStation Vita ports	
2014	Titanfall	Xbox 360	Electronic Arts	Xbox 360 port	
2022	God of War Ragnarök	PlayStation 4, PlayStation 5	Sony Interactive Entertainment	Additional work	
