= Blast Factor =

2006 video game

- Developer: Bluepoint Games (Note: Additional work by Santa Monica Studio)
- Publisher: Sony Computer Entertainment
- Platform: PlayStation 3
- Release: JP: November 11, 2006; NA: November 17, 2006; PAL: March 23, 2007
- Genre: Shooter
- Modes: Single-player, multiplayer

Blast Factor is a shooter video game developed by Bluepoint Games and published by Sony Computer Entertainment for the PlayStation 3. One of the first games to be released only on the PlayStation Network, it is the first game developed by Bluepoint Games, and their only game that is not a remaster, remake or port of a previously developed game. Sony, whose Santa Monica Studio assisted on development, began a close relationship with Bluepoint Games, which culminated in Bluepoint being purchased by Sony and integrated as part of PlayStation Studios.

== Gameplay ==
In Blast Factor the player pilots a microscopic craft through a series of infected cells and uses the craft's weaponry to rid the cell of various infections.

The left analog stick moves the craft and the right fires the weapon. Additionally, the player can violently tilt the Sixaxis controller to the left or right to slosh the playing field to one side or the other, resulting in the infections being forced to one side, often grouping them for easier elimination. The player also has use of a Bio Magnetic Repulsor (B.M.R.) that triggers a time dilation effect and a force field that can be used to push away enemies. The B.M.R. recharges every 2 seconds in single player mode.

Each cell the player enters will have several infections appear. The objective to destroy all of the infections. The types and behaviors of the infections vary as the game progresses.

The player must cleanse 8 cells (or waves) in a specimen (or game level) to move on to the next specimen. There are various powerups to be gained, such as a Multi-Shot, Homing Super, and Super B.M.R. The latter power up triggers a disruptive blast that destroys all enemies within range.

The player can increase their score by using the 'Blast Factor' of enemy explosions. Enemies caught in the destructive radius of an explosion will themselves be destroyed, giving an additional score bonus to the player. The score multiplier increases with each enemy destroyed in a chain of explosions.

The game has a self-modifying difficulty level based on the skill of the player. The difficulty is determined by changing the path of cells through each specimen. If the player does not die and completes the current cell within the specified time limit, the player is moved to the harder cell on completion. If the player dies, or does not finish the cell within the specified time limit, the player is moved to the easier cell. More points are awarded for completion of hard cells.

Trophies were made available via patch v2.01 on December 4, 2008, in North America and June 29, 2009, in Europe.

== Downloadable content ==
Blast Factor Multiplayer Pack was released on February 1, 2007. The multiplayer is restricted to the local console only, one to four players. The multiplayer pack includes 2 new game modes, Co-op where 2-4 players each control a ship and work together to complete specimens, and a Grudge Match mode where 2-4 players compete to eliminate each other with the last player remaining winning the round.

The expansion also allows the single player and multiplayer games to be played with two new speed modes: AT (Accelerated Time, 15% game play speed increase), and 2xAT (30% gameplay speed). The AT modes also give an additional score bonus at the end of each specimen, with AT awarding a 25% score bonus, and 2xAT awarding a 50% score bonus.

The multiplayer pack is only available on the American PlayStation Store. For those purchasing the game on the European store, the above features are included as standard.

The Blast Factor Advanced Research add-on pack was released in the US on August 2, 2007. This expansion is an additional optional download for Blast Factor similar to the American multiplayer pack. It was released on the European store on May 6, 2008.

New features include seven new specimens with enhanced art, new enemy types and bosses, enhanced music and sound effects, and additional online high score tables.

A practice mode which allows players to start at completed specimens, and a new hybrid mode which allows an extended playthrough of a selection of the old and new specimens are also part of the expansion pack.

== Reception ==
Reception

Aggregate score
Aggregator	Score
Metacritic	68/100

Review scores
Publication	Score
Eurogamer	6/10
GameSpot	6.6/10
IGN	(A.R.) 7.3/10 (UK) 7/10 (M.P.) 6.5/10 (US) 5.9/10
PlayStation Official Magazine – UK	7/10
Play	72%
PSM3	85%
VideoGamer.com	7/10

The game received "average" reviews according to the review aggregation website Metacritic.
