= Metal Gear Solid HD Collection =

2011 video game compilation

- Developer: Kojima Productions (Note: Bluepoint Games was responsible for porting MGS2 and MGS3, and Genki worked on the Peace Walker port. Aspect Co. reworked Metal Gear and Metal Gear 2: Solid Snake, which were included in MGS3 previously. Armature Studio ported the HD Collection to the PS Vita and the Nvidia Shield TV.)
- Publisher: Konami
- Producers: Hideo Kojima; Ken-Ichiro Imaizumi; Yoshikazu Matsuhana (PW HD); Kazuki Muraoka (PW HD)
- Artist: Yoji Shinkawa
- Series: Metal Gear
- Platforms: PlayStation 3; Xbox 360; PlayStation Vita; Nvidia Shield TV
- Release: PlayStation 3 & Xbox 360: NA: November 8, 2011; JP: November 23, 2011; EU: February 3, 2012; AU: February 16, 2012; PlayStation Vita: NA: June 12, 2012; JP: June 28, 2012; EU: June 29, 2012; AU: July 5, 2012
- Genre: Stealth
- Mode: Single-player

Metal Gear Solid HD Collection (Note: Japanese: METAL GEAR SOLID(メタルギアソリッド) HD EDITION(エディション), Hepburn: Metaru Gia Soriddo HD Edishon) is a compilation of remastered ports of Metal Gear video games released for PlayStation 3 and Xbox 360 in 2011 and PlayStation Vita in 2012. The compilation contains Metal Gear Solid 2: Sons of Liberty and Metal Gear Solid 3: Snake Eater on all three platforms, plus Metal Gear Solid: Peace Walker on the home console versions (outside Japan), with the individual games all branded as HD Edition. Bluepoint Games handled the conversions of Metal Gear Solid 2 and 3 (with Armature Studio assisting on the PS Vita and the Nvidia Shield TV versions), while Genki worked on Peace Walker.

== Games ==
The included games are:

Games included in Metal Gear Solid HD Collection
Title	Original platform	Original release
Metal Gear (Note: Accessible from the main menu in Metal Gear Solid 3)	MSX2	1987
Metal Gear 2: Solid Snake	MSX2	1990
Metal Gear Solid 2: Sons of Liberty	PlayStation 2	2001
Metal Gear Solid 2: Substance	Xbox, PlayStation 2	2002
Metal Gear Solid 3: Snake Eater	PlayStation 2	2004
Metal Gear Solid 3: Subsistence	PlayStation 2	2006
Metal Gear Solid: Peace Walker (Note: Sold separately in Japan on the PS3 and Xbox 360 (The latter with some on a separate disc). Not included in the PS Vita version.)	PlayStation Portable	2010

== Features ==
The core play mechanics and story for all games remains unchanged with the HD Editions. For the remastering, all three games underwent graphics overhaul to allow them to support modern 720p resolution and 60 frames per second on home consoles. The PS3 and PS Vita versions have Trophy support, while the Xbox 360 versions include Achievements.

The controls for each game have been modified to suit the different configurations of each platform. Since the Xbox 360 and PS Vita version lack the pressure-sensitive buttons featured on the PS2 controllers, the ability to aim and lower a firearm without firing it in Metal Gear Solid 2 and 3 are assigned to a specific button instead in those versions (either, by pressing the left stick on the Xbox 360 controller or by pressing the d-pad down on the PS Vita). The PS Vita versions in particular makes use of the touch screen and touch pad for various functions such as item/weapon selection, zooming in or out with the binoculars or peeking around corners or over walls during 'corner view'. The console versions of Peace Walker feature dual analog controls, allowing players to control the camera or their aim with the right stick.

Most of the additional features and content that were present in the Substance and Subsistence editions of the games have been ported to the HD Editions as well. These include the VR/Alternative Missions, Snake Tales and Casting Theater modes for Metal Gear Solid 2, plus the third-person camera view and Demo Theater for Metal Gear Solid 3. The original Metal Gear and Metal Gear 2: Solid Snake as they appeared in the Subsistence edition are also included, accessible from the main menu in Metal Gear Solid 3.

The PS3 and Vita versions of Metal Gear Solid 2 and 3 have a "Transfarring" feature, which allows users to transfer their save file between both platforms via a Wi-Fi connection or through a cloud storage, allowing continuous play of the same save file on a different platform. The PS3 version of Peace Walker has a similar connectivity with the PSP version of the game, allowing the transferring of save files through a USB connection.

== Releases ==
=== Regional differences ===
The Japanese release of the compilation, titled Metal Gear Solid HD Edition, only includes Metal Gear Solid 2 and Metal Gear Solid 3, even on the home console versions. Metal Gear Solid: Peace Walker – HD Edition was instead given a stand-alone physical release on PS3 and Xbox 360 in Japan. To compensate for the separate releases, the first print run of the Japanese PS3 version of the compilation included a voucher code to download the original Metal Gear Solid from the Japanese PlayStation Store, while the first print run of Peace Walker – HD Edition came with a download code for the PlayStation Portable version of Peace Walker. The Japanese Xbox 360 versions of both, the compilation and Peace Walker, instead offered voucher codes for Metal Gear-themed items for Xbox Live Avatars. Both Metal Gear Solid 2 and Metal Gear Solid 3 feature Japanese voice acting for the Japanese HD Editions, despite Metal Gear Solid 2 being based on the Substance edition, which originally used English voices.

=== Limited editions ===
The Zavvi-exclusive Limited Edition for the UK and Europe, before revealed as Ultimate HD Edition and Ultimate HD Collection

On August 15, 2011, UK retailer Zavvi secured the exclusive right to sell the Metal Gear Solid: Ultimate HD Collection, exclusively available for the PS3, which was set to see only 4,000 copies manufactured worldwide and would be released on November 25. It would include the HD Collection, and the Ultimate version would add to the package with the PS3 game Metal Gear Solid 4: Guns of the Patriots, a download code for Metal Gear Solid and five exclusive art cards. The contents would come in a single steel book packaging. However, on November 25, it disappeared from Zavvi without explanation. On November 30, Zavvi changed the name from Ultimate HD Collection to Ultimate HD Edition, and announced that its altered the contents of its advertised Metal Gear Solid: HD Ultimate Edition set. Zavvi sent out an email to all customers holding an order for the edition, explaining that Konami has "advised of a change to the contents" of the set. The edition would include variant Metal Gear Solid steel book, an exclusive Metal Gear Solid T-shirt and an exclusive 250 page premium art book showcasing the artwork of Yoji Shinkawa. All those who pre-ordered the previous edition before it was cancelled also receive a Platinum copy of Metal Gear Solid 4. Zavvi's site also has a listing for an Xbox 360 version of the revised Ultimate Edition, making it no longer exclusive for the PS3. On December 7, Zavvi renamed the edition to Metal Gear Solid HD Collection Limited Edition, and revealed that 6000 copies of the PS3 version and 4000 copies of the Xbox 360 version are available for pre-order. In total 8000 (PS3) and 5000 (360) units are being made worldwide.

A North American Limited Edition for the HD Collection became available alongside the standard release. The Limited Edition includes specialized packaging created by Yoji Shinkawa, the series' lead artist, and an exclusive, 248-page art book titled The Art of Metal Gear Solid.

A Japanese Premium Package for both the Metal Gear Solid HD Collection and the separate (Japan-only) HD conversion of Peace Walker is also released. The Peace Walker package includes the game, a Play Arts figure of Snake in Battle Dress and an audio CD featuring vocal and unused music tracks. The Limited Edition of Metal Gear Solid HD Edition will include a copy of the game, an illustration from series artist Yoji Shinkawa, a copy of The Art of Metal Gear Solid The Original Trilogy, and an audio CD with vocal tracks from each of the first three games. Paying extra, players receive Metal Gear Solid 2 and Metal Gear Solid 3 mugs, headphones and bags. Paying extra for the Peace Walker package includes a Peace Walker mug and a Kazuhira Miller Play Arts Kai figure.

=== Digital releases ===
The HD Edition-branded versions of all three games were later released as digital downloads on the Xbox Live Marketplace and PlayStation Store. The digital versions of Metal Gear Solid 2 and 3 were released on August 21, 2012 as a bundle on the Xbox 360 and individually on PS3 and PS Vita, while Peace Walker was released for the Xbox 360 and PS3 on August 28, 2012. A digital version of the full collection was also released for the PS3. The Xbox 360 version of Peace Walker was added to the Xbox One's backwards compatibility program on March 13, 2018. Metal Gear Solid 2 and 3 were later added to the backwards compatibility program on October 9 of the same year. The PS3 version of the HD Collection was made available on the PlayStation Now streaming service on February 5, 2019. The Xbox 360 version became backwards compatible with the Xbox One on October 8, 2018, joining the Xbox Game Pass subscription service catalog on September 5, 2019. With the release of Xbox Series X/S on November 10, 2020, Metal Gear Solid HD Collection automatically became compatible on the console.

=== The Legacy Collection ===
On April 22, 2013, Konami announced a new version of the collection titled Metal Gear Solid: The Legacy Collection, exclusive to PS3. This later collection includes all the games featured on the HD Collection on the first disc, along with Metal Gear Solid 4: Guns of the Patriots on a second disc and voucher codes for the original Metal Gear Solid and Metal Gear Solid: VR Missions. The Legacy Collection was released in North America on July 9, 2013, and in Japan on July 11, 2013. The European version was released on September 13, 2013.

=== Metal Gear Solid: Master Collection ===
On October 24, 2023, Konami released Metal Gear Solid: Master Collection Vol. 1, a compilation of various Metal Gear titles that includes all games from the HD Collection, except Peace Walker. It was released for the Nintendo Switch, PlayStation 4, PlayStation 5, Windows, and Xbox Series X/S. The included versions of Metal Gear Solid 2 and Metal Gear Solid 3 are based on the ones in the HD Collection. Metal Gear 1 and 2 are moved from Solid 3 menu to their own separate app.

Konami announced that the games would have a resolution of 1080p and run at 60 frames-per-second (FPS) at maximum performance on PlayStation 4, PlayStation 5, Windows and Xbox Series X/S. The Nintendo Switch versions of Metal Gear Solid 2 and Metal Gear Solid 3 however would run at 30 FPS (matching the Nvidia Shield port that the Switch version was derived from, and which the Switch shares a Tegra X1 CPU with) while in TV Mode and Handheld Mode, at a resolution of 1080p and 720p, respectively. However, on release it was found that the games were actually locked to 720p on all platforms. The PC version also lacked any graphics or audio options upon launch. On December 23rd, 2023, the games received an update adding several video and audio options. On September 25th, 2024, all systems (with the exception of the Switch) also received a patch increasing the games' maximum resolutions to up to 4K, as well as upscaling all of Metal Gear Solid 2 & Metal Gear Solid 3's full motion videos to 4K.

== Reception ==
Reception

Aggregate score
Aggregator	Score
Metacritic	(X360) 90/100 (PS3) 89/100 (Vita) 81/100

Review scores
Publication	Score
1Up.com	A
Eurogamer	9/10
Game Informer	9/10
GamesRadar+	9/10
GameTrailers	9/10
IGN	9/10
PlayStation Official Magazine – UK	9/10
Official Xbox Magazine (US)	9/10

Metal Gear Solid HD Collection received critical acclaim upon release. Review aggregator Metacritic gave the Xbox 360 version 90/100, the PlayStation 3 version 89/100 and the PlayStation Vita version 81/100.

In December 2011, the game received the award for "Best HD Remake of 2011" from TeamXbox, with Halo: Combat Evolved Anniversary as the runner-up. In a feature article regarding games collections, 1UP listed Metal Gear Solid HD Collection as "The Closest We've Come to Perfection" owing to the improved quality its games were given.

The compilation's absence of Metal Gear Solid drew scrutiny, particularly as a 6th gen remake of the game existed in the form of 2004's Metal Gear Solid: The Twin Snakes. In response, Kojima Productions' Sean Eyestone stated that The Twin Snakes was not included as neither the developers nor Hideo Kojima were directly involved with the creation of the game and therefore did not consider it canon.
