= Metal Gear Solid: Peace Walker =

2010 video game

- Developer: Kojima Productions
- Publisher: Konami
- Director: Hideo Kojima
- Producers: Hideo Kojima; Kenichiro Imaizumi; Kazuki Muraoka; Yoshikazu Matsuhana
- Designer: Hideo Kojima
- Programmers: Masao Tomosawa; Makoto Sonoyama
- Artist: Yoji Shinkawa
- Writers: Hideo Kojima; Shuyo Murata
- Composers: Akihiro Honda; Kazuma Jinnouchi; Nobuko Toda
- Series: Metal Gear
- Platform: PlayStation Portable
- Release: JP: April 29, 2010; NA: June 8, 2010; AU: June 17, 2010; EU: June 18, 2010
- Genre: Stealth
- Modes: Single-player, multiplayer

Metal Gear Solid: Peace Walker (Note: Japanese: メタルギアソリッド：ピースウォーカー, Hepburn: Metaru Gia Soriddo: Pīsu Uōkā) is a 2010 action-adventure stealth game developed by Kojima Productions and published by Konami for the PlayStation Portable. Written, directed, and designed by Hideo Kojima, it is the seventh mainline Metal Gear game and serves as a narrative sequel to Metal Gear Solid 3: Snake Eater (2004) and Metal Gear Solid: Portable Ops (2006). (Note: There is significant debate over the canonicity of Portable Ops, which is set in between Snake Eater and Peace Walker but was not made with Kojima's involvement: see Metal Gear Solid: Portable Ops#Placement in the series' canon.) Set in 1974, the game follows returning protagonist Snake (Note: Within the series' continuity, the character is recognized as having adopted the name "Big Boss". However, he prefers to go by "Snake" in the story and is billed as such in the ending credits, although other characters still occasionally call him "Big Boss".) as he operates the private mercenary organization Militaires Sans Frontières (MSF). When a heavily armed paramilitary force occupies Costa Rica, Snake and MSF are hired to investigate the threat, unveiling a rogue plot centered on the Peace Walker, an AI-powered nuclear-equipped weapon.

Initially supposed to be developed by other staff members, Kojima took the role of director simultaneously with Metal Gear Solid 4: Guns of the Patriots (2008) in order to target the game to a younger demographic of players. The game expands on series mechanics with traditional stealth action missions and a new "Mother Base" management system, where players recruit soldiers, research gear, and expand their military force. Peace Walker also has multiplayer functionality, featuring cooperative story missions and competitive team battles.

Peace Walker received critical acclaim, with praise directed towards its narrative, new mechanics, base management system, and scale on a small form factor, but the PlayStation Portable version failed to match the commercial success of its console predecessors due to declining support for the system. A sequel, Metal Gear Solid V: Ground Zeroes, was released in 2014. A remastered version of the game was released in 2011 as part of the Metal Gear Solid HD Collection, which was rereleased in the Metal Gear Solid: Master Collection Vol. 2 compilation in 2026.

== Gameplay ==
Peace Walker consists of two primary gameplay modes: "Mission" and "Mother Base". "Mission" are the actual action sequences of the game, where the player must infiltrate an enemy territory or fight a boss, whereas "Mother Base" is an army management mode similar to the briefing screen in Portable Ops.

=== Missions ===
Players get to choose which missions to play from the "Mission Selector" screen. There are two main types of Missions: Main Ops are the primary story-based missions in which goals are determined by the narrative and must be played in a strict order in order to proceed. Some Main Ops missions include illustrated cutscenes that involve bits of interactivity in order to proceed. Extra Ops are optional missions that involve much more elaborate goals ranging from simple target practices to obtaining secret documents.

When the player completes a mission, their performance is evaluated afterward. A player's score is penalized with a lower rank and reduced heroism for excessive killing and frequently being discovered, whereas players who are stealthy and subdue enemy soldiers non-lethally will be awarded appropriately. Players can replay previously cleared missions for higher scores.

Snake and an MSF soldier conducting a Co-Ops mission. The image has Snake in Naked uniform hiding from a Peace Sentinels soldier, armed with an M60 GPMG. The player's partner is barely seen hiding on the other side of the truck.

The game adopts certain play mechanics from Metal Gear Solid 4, such as the crouching walk, the over-the-shoulder shooting view, the CQC system, and the ability to search held-up soldiers. The truck from Portable Ops, where players can bring subdued enemies for recruitment, has been discarded in favor of the Fulton Recovery System, which players attach to subdued soldiers and prisoners. The Wi-Fi recruitment system from Portable Ops has been modified so that instead of tapping the Circle button to obtain a strong enough signal from an access point, the player will have to knock out soldiers using CQC to accept them. The cardboard box used to hide from enemy soldiers is now available in two-man versions called Love Boxes, which have different variants. The Surround Indicator in Portable Ops can also be used only when it is equipped in the item box and players will also develop and use an early version of the Soliton radar system from the original Metal Gear Solid. The game features the camouflage index system from Snake Eater, but the player does not have the ability to change camouflage uniforms during a mission as the point index will be entirely based on movement, position, and the size of the weapon equipped in the weapon box. The player can also use marking devices to call in artillery strikes or resupply drops.

Movement is done on the analog stick; actions such as co-op actions use the directional-pad; melee actions, which include multiple throws into crowds of enemies, use the R button; and weapons use the L button with the R button. Players will be unable to move or shoot while lying down and while pinned on a wall. The player can set the control system according to that of Portable Ops, Guns of the Patriots, or Capcom's Monster Hunter series.

Before starting a mission, the player can choose a character, along with their weapon loadout, which is determined by the wardrobe chosen. Players can choose to control Snake or any MSF soldier assigned to the combat unit, with male and female members both available to choose from. Each soldier has their own combat stats, which measures a soldier's offensive and defensive capabilities. Some of the main missions will only be available to Snake, and likewise for MSF soldiers and certain extra ops. The player's carrying capacity is limited and any excessive items that the player obtains during a mission will be transferred over to Mother Base's inventory. There are four primary types of uniforms that can be worn by the player character.

- Jungle Fatigues – The default uniform. A balance of stealth, defense, weapons, and inventory. Alternate versions of this outfit with different colors and camo patterns can be obtained throughout various missions
- Naked – A shirtless version of the Jungle Fatigues, players using Naked uniforms move faster at the cost of lower camo index, weaker defense, and fewer items. When worn by an MSF soldier, they will be wearing a brown tank top.
- Sneaking Suit – Resembling the sneaking suit worn by Solid Snake in previous Metal Gear Solid games, it allows players to move without generating foot noise and have higher camouflage compared to other suits while moving, but restricts them to five items and six secondary weapons. The design of the Sneaking Suit worn by MSF soldiers differs slightly from Snake's version.
- Battle Dress – A heavily armored suit that allows the player to carry a third primary weapon and absorb heavy firepower, but at the cost of a lower item carrying capacity, slower mobility and a lower camouflage index. A variant outfitted with a metal headband for Snake, or a helmet for MSF Soldiers, is also available, which increases the defenses.

Other outfits are also available, such as t-shirts in various designs, swimsuits, a tuxedo and outfits inspired by the wardrobe of supporting characters.

=== Mother Base ===
Mother Base is an abandoned OTEC research platform in the Caribbean that serves as the MSF's headquarters. Aside from managing the combat, medical, intelligence, and technology research teams seen in Portable Ops, the player can assign personnel to the mess hall crew to feed the troops and keep up their morale. Rebellious or injured personnel can be brought to the brig and sickbay, respectively. The player can capture military vehicles that appear in the game as minor boss opponents, such as armored personnel carriers, tanks, and attack helicopters. Up to 350 soldiers can be recruited; excess staff caught in a mission must be discharged and up to 50 vehicles can be captured over the course of the game.

Items and weapons are not procured on-site, but rather they are developed by MSF's research and development division based on blueprints obtained from missions. New items and weapons can only be developed when the player has sufficient GMP (Gross Military Product, the player's currency) and certain MSF divisions have reached the required level. Once development of an item has been completed, the R&D staff will automatically mass-produce them for the entire army.

Outer Ops is a new game mechanic where players can deploy their combat unit soldiers (with the exception of Snake and other unique characters) and captured vehicles on certain missions against computer opponents. Each assault force codenamed from Alpha to Hotel has eight slots for assigning vehicles or soldiers, who can gain combat bonuses such as additional hit points and Psyche points, and generate income for the team. Depending on the scale of the enemy's firepower, MSF soldiers who are defeated during the battle can either die or be brought to sickbay for treatment. Vehicles that show damage in one mission will still show damage unless they are taken off the front for repairs, while decommissioned vehicles will be stricken from the inventory.

During the course of the game, the player will fight advanced AI-controlled vehicles, code-named PUPA, CHRYSALIS, COCOON, and the titular Peace Walker. Each of these vehicles has an AI pod that the player can infiltrate after sufficiently damaging the vehicle in a boss battle, at which point the player must remove AI boards from within to shut down the AI and fully defeat the boss. Depending on the player's strategy in defeating these bosses, vehicle parts and AI boards can be harvested and used to build Metal Gear ZEKE, a bipedal mech designed by Dr. Emmerich for MSF to protect the organization from foreign aggression. ZEKE can be employed on Outer Ops missions as a support vehicle, and its level of development influences the difficulty of the final mission of the storyline.

=== Multiplayer ===
In addition to the standard single-player mode, most of the missions can also be played cooperatively through an additional game mode called Co-Ops. Infiltration missions during Co-Ops can be played alongside a second player, while up to four players can participate in battles against enemy vehicles and AI weapons. There are several actions that can take place when two players are next to each other. The "snake formation" allows two players to synchronize with each other as one player leads the way, also allowing the players to fire on the move. Other co-operative actions include holding up closing doors, performing CPR on fallen comrades, sharing items, and acting as a spotter when a partner's vision is obscured.

Versus Ops are multiplayer matches played over special versions of certain maps. The player has a choice of whether to organize individual or team deathmatches, base capture and quetzal capture missions. Only certain items or weapons unlocked in the single-player campaign can be used in the mode. Each match can gather up to six players with restrictions included, such as life and psyche points not regained and limited time for CPR revivals.

=== Cutscenes ===
The in-game cutscenes come in two different varieties: 3D sequences rendered using the game engine, and 2D motion comic sequences utilizing an illustration style similar to those featured in Metal Gear Solid: Digital Graphic Novel and Metal Gear Solid: Portable Ops. The latter style has gameplay relevance, being host to quick-time events that have differing effects on the outcome of missions, ranging from contribution to mission rankings, recruitment of personnel, determining mission success, and affecting the outcome of a subsequent mission. The 3D-rendered cutscenes are available with either text-only narration, or with the inclusion of voice acting—the latter requires the decompression and installation of audio data to the PSP storage media, to permit simultaneous audio playback and game rendering without real-time decompression overhead; this feature also permits voiced radio calls during missions. 2D cutscenes are available with full audio support without installation to media.

During the Mother Base mode of gameplay, plot details, tutorials, and character interviews can be accessed as well, taking the in-game form of cassette tapes played back on Sony Walkman players.

== Synopsis ==
Peace Walker begins on November 4, 1974. Big Boss is running his own mercenary unit in Colombia after leaving the United States, following the death of The Boss during Operation Snake Eater ten years prior. A mysterious paramilitary group equipped with a startling quantity of quality weapons, called the "Peace Sentinels", has been deployed in Costa Rica. Despite the Sentinels being equipped with firepower equivalent to that of a land army, the Costa Rican government cannot do anything about them because the country's constitution does not allow the creation of an official military. The Sentinels' presence threatens to endanger the balance of power between the East and West.

=== Characters ===
The game's returning protagonist is Big Boss, otherwise known as Snake (David Hayter/Akio Ōtsuka), who is leading a new mercenary group called Militaires Sans Frontières (commonly abbreviated as MSF). He is assisted in this endeavor by MSF deputy chief Kazuhira Miller (Robin Atkin Downes/Tomokazu Sugita). They are eventually joined later in the game by Sandinista rebel leader Amanda Valenciano Libre (Grey DeLisle/Romi Park) and her younger brother, Ricardo "Chico" Valenciano Libre (Antony Del Rio/Kikuko Inoue); Paz Ortega Andrade (Tara Strong/Nana Mizuki), a student at the University for Peace; Dr. "Huey" Emmerich (Christopher Randolph/Hideyuki Tanaka), a weapons engineer working on the Peace Walker Project; and French ornithologist Cécile Cosima Caminades (Catherine Taber/Yū Kobayashi).

The game's main antagonists are Hot Coldman (H. Richard Greene/Mugihito), who is the CIA Central America station chief, and Ramón Gálvez Mena (Steven Blum/Hōchū Ōtsuka), Paz's instructor. Dr. Strangelove (Vanessa Marshall/Yumi Kikuchi) is a British AI expert whom Coldman hired to work on the Peace Walker Project and is later attracted to Huey.

The game also features flashback scenes from MGS3, particularly the final battle between Snake and The Boss, plus the audiotape that EVA (Jodi Benson/Misa Watanabe) left behind after Operation Snake Eater. Through a set of audiotape briefing files unlocked upon completing the game, EVA also provides Snake with new information about The Boss' activities during a period where Snake was unable to keep in touch with her. Lori Alan and Kikuko Inoue also reprise their voice roles as The Boss in the flashbacks and as the voice of the Mammal Pod AI construct modeled after The Boss. Trenya from Capcom's Monster Hunter series also appears as Snake's transporter to a mythical island, where he can battle the Rathalos and Tigrex monsters from the same series.

=== Plot ===
Four years after the events of the San Hieronymo incident, Big Boss—who prefers his original codename, Snake—and Kaz Miller have established Militaires Sans Frontières, a small mercenary faction, on the Colombian coast. They are approached by Ramon Galvez Mena, a professor at the University for Peace, and his student, Paz Ortega Andrade. Galvez attempts to hire MSF to investigate an army that has discreetly occupied parts of Costa Rica. Snake refuses, identifying Galvez as a KGB agent, but is convinced when Paz plays a recording of The Boss.

When Snake arrives in Costa Rica, he begins to suspect that the mystery army has brought nuclear weapons with them. Enlisting the help of the Sandinista Liberation Army, he tracks a shipment to a research facility deep in the mountains. His suspicions are confirmed when he witnesses Hot Coldman, a senior CIA agent, announce his intentions to fire a live nuclear weapon as part of a project code-named "Peace Walker", a fail-deadly nuclear tank. Snake reveals himself to Huey Emmerich, one of Peace Walker's designers, who agrees to help him stop Coldman.

Following Huey's instructions, Snake ventures deeper into Costa Rica, searching for Dr. Strangelove, the designer of Peace Walker's artificial intelligence systems. He discovers that Strangelove has based Peace Walker's primary control systems on The Boss' personality. She demands to know whether The Boss genuinely defected to the Soviet Union, or if she died on a mission that was covered up, going so far as to torture Snake for information.

Snake escapes custody and attempts in vain to destroy Peace Walker, a quadrupedal nuclear launch platform. He chases Peace Walker across the Nicaraguan border to an American airbase on the shores of Lake Cocibolca. Discovering that the base has been occupied by Soviet soldiers, Snake infiltrates the facility to confront Coldman. Coldman reveals the purpose of Peace Walker: he believes that nuclear deterrence is a flawed theory, relying on humans to retaliate in the event of a nuclear exchange, whom he believes to be unwilling to destroy their own race. As an impartial artificial intelligence, Peace Walker would guarantee retaliation, and Coldman intends to fire a warhead to prove it. Suddenly, the facility is overrun by Soviet soldiers, led by Galvez, who reveals himself as Vladimir Zadornov. Zadornov intends to hijack Peace Walker for the Soviet Union, but the standoff is broken by the arrival of MSF and the Sandinistas, giving Snake enough time to destroy Peace Walker.

In the aftermath of the battle, Zadornov is captured, and Coldman mortally wounded. In his dying moments, Coldman activates Peace Walker's data uplink, convincing NORAD that the United States is about to be hit by a Soviet nuclear strike. Snake contacts NORAD, and tries to convince them to stand down, but senior members of the armed forces refuse and plan to retaliate. With a nuclear strike imminent, The Boss' personality takes control of Peace Walker's damaged artificial intelligence and drowns Peace Walker in Lake Cocibolca, severing the connection and ending the threat.

Sometime later, Zadornov repeatedly escapes from MSF, the last of which leads to his death, arousing Snake's suspicions that someone has betrayed them. Paz reveals herself to be the traitor, using Zadornov's escapes to seize control of Metal Gear ZEKE, a walking tank designed by Huey to act as MSF's deterrent against foreign intervention. Acting as an agent of Major Zero—now using the name "Cipher"—Paz issues Snake an ultimatum: surrender MSF to Cipher and become his deterrent, or else she will fire a nuclear warhead on America, at which point they will be branded a nuclear-equipped extremist cult, and the world will unite in their pursuit of MSF. Snake prevents the launch by crippling ZEKE, and Paz is thrown into the ocean.

In the aftermath, Snake reconciles with his memory of The Boss, but feels she betrayed her life's purpose by “putting down her gun”, and vows to keep fighting. Snake accepts the title of Big Boss as he rallies the soldiers of MSF to prepare for a fight for their survival, declaring them to be living in "Outer Heaven".

== Development ==
The idea of Peace Walker originated during the development of Metal Gear Solid: Portable Ops. Although Kojima planned to leave the project in the hands of other members from Kojima Productions, in order to make the plot's message clearer for the young demographic, he took the role of director at the same time as he was developing Metal Gear Solid 4: Guns of the Patriots. The game was made for the PlayStation Portable due to content that could only work on it, such as the cooperative multiplayer feature. While being a stealth-based game like the previous titles, new gameplay features such as the customization and levelling up were added to increase the replay value. The use of a cooperative mode is intended to have players help each other and grow a sense of friendship. The development team that worked on Peace Walker was as large as the team that worked on Metal Gear Solid 4: Guns of the Patriots. Although several of the staff members had already worked on Metal Gear Solid: Portable Ops, Peace Walker was created with a different mindset. Kojima considered Peace Walker to be the biggest game he has ever worked on. During the planning stages, the game was known as Metal Gear Solid 5: Peace Walker.

As seen in previous Metal Gear games, Peace Walker features antiwar and antinuclear themes, this time focused on the countries' states and relationships. The game's theme is "Peace". Character-wise, it was made to show Snake's experiences throughout the story that make him accept the title of Big Boss, further resembling his antagonist persona from the first Metal Gear game. Due to the game's intended audience, Peace Walker is the first main Metal Gear game to receive a "Teen" rating from the ESRB since Metal Gear Solid: Portable Ops Plus.

=== Music ===
The Metal Gear Solid: Peace Walker Original Soundtrack was released on April 14, 2010. The soundtrack is primarily composed by Kojima Productions' Kazuma Jinnouchi and Nobuko Toda, with Akihiro Honda providing the orchestral theme and the theme songs, "Heavens Divide" (performed in English by Australian singer and actress Donna Burke) and "Koi no Yokushiryoku (Love Deterrence)" (performed in Japanese by singer-songwriter Nana Mizuki, Paz's Japanese voice actress). Norihiko Hibino, Yoshitaka Suzuki, Takahiro Izutani, Todd Haberman, and Jeremy Soule also provided additional compositions for the game. The game also features music from other Metal Gear Solid games, such as Portable Ops's "Calling to The Night", which can be played in the game's Walkmans. The game's credit music features a faithful cover version of the Carpenters' 1973 performance of "Sing" sung by Japanese-American vocalist and musician Cindy Asada. In the context of the game, the song appears on a taped recording and is sung by the Boss AI as Peace Walker sinks under Lake Cocibolca. The game also used the Vocaloid software.

== Marketing ==
On March 27, 2010, Japanese beverage firm Suntory released a special line of eight cans in Japan that have images of various Peace Walker characters for the Mountain Dew and Pepsi Nex lines. The drinks are promoted in the game as health items, with Snake possibly getting a Mountain Dew shirt after the player inputs a special code found in the actual cans. Japanese apparel brand Uniqlo also ran a similar promotion. However, the labelled products were only available in the Japanese version; their counterpart in the North American and European version would have generic names and the MSF logo. The player can also use various incarnations of Sony Walkmans to listen to the game's background music. Sony also released a limited-edition W Series Walkman, the NWZ-W252CAMO, which comes with special game codes, six exclusive tracks from the game, and a special camouflage skin.

On April 1, 2010, Konami released a short promotional video with Patrice Desilets, the creative director of Assassin's Creed II. The clip, which was an April Fool's Day joke, features Snake performing Altaïr's "leap of faith" dive into a large pile of hay (the Assassin's Straw Box) and stealthily knocking out enemies. The Easter egg is part of the game as a special Love Box that players can use to capture enemies, but it can also deteriorate with repeated use. Konami and Ubisoft earlier produced an Assassin's Creed-themed April Fool's Day joke for Metal Gear Solid 4 in 2008, which featured Snake wearing an Altaïr costume.

On April 7, 2010, Konami and Square Enix unveiled a new line of action figures based on the game. Released under Square's Play Arts Kai series, the line features the Sneaking Suit and Jungle Fatigues variants of Snake and the game's main boss machines – Chrysalis (the VTOL aircraft featured in the original E3 trailer), Pupa (a derivative of the Shagohod), Basilisk (the mech being carried by Chrysalis in the TGS09 trailer), and the Cocoon (a large mobile fortress with multiple turrets). In addition, parts of the Peace Sentinels mechs, plus special game logos, can be transferred to Front Mission Evolved for use in the Wanzers. The line has since expanded to add figures of Battle Dress Snake, Miller and Metal Gear ZEKE, which can be accessorized with certain parts packaged in the Peace Sentinels mech figures. Kaiyodo's Revoltech line followed with a Snake in Sneaking Suit action figure in 2012.

To build interest for the game's North American release, Konami, Best Buy, and Sony Online Entertainment launched a code-collecting contest on May 5, 2010. The "Code Hunt", which was exclusive to United States customers of PlayStation Home, would have teams of five contestants scouring locations for elusive Peace Walker codes, each of which would get them closer and closer to the grand prize. The promo ended on June 2 with the winners announced on June 29. The prizes included $10,000 in cash and Peace Walker Big Boss Bundles.

With the game's Japan release on April 29, Konami embarked on a world tour to promote the game. The Asian leg started simultaneously in Tokyo and Yokohama, followed by events in Yokohama, Nagoya, Osaka, Seoul, Taipei, and Hong Kong. The U.S. leg had events in Los Angeles and New York, with the European legs held in Paris and London, to coincide with the EU release of the game.

=== Demo Ops ===
A nine-minute video was shown at Gamescom, which strongly emphasized its co-operative play (the term Co-Ops was used frequently, obviously mirroring Portable Ops, which utilized a solo sneaking motif for its story mode). The game made its playable debut at Tokyo Game Show 2009, and IGN released a Japanese-language demo version.

On December 17, 2009, the official English demo of the game was released on the PlayStation Network, containing the levels from the 2009 Tokyo Game Show Japanese demo along with an all-new boss battle. A survey was made available on Konami's website for the rest of the month after December 17.

== Release ==
=== Editions and bundles ===
Two Metal Gear Solid: Peace Walker Bundle versions have been released in Japan, one consists of the game with a camouflaged PSP-3000, leather pouch, leather wrist strap, cloth, dog tags, numbered collectible stands, and a booklet for ¥36,980 or US$404 with 1,974 copies only being made when the game is released on March 18, 2010, from the Konami Style Store. The other bundle offer includes the camouflaged PSP-3000, a pouch, a wrist strap, a camouflaged cleaning cloth and the Peace Walker UMD for ¥26,980 or US$295.

For North and South American players, Sony released a special GameStop exclusive Big Boss Pack that featured a camouflaged PSP-3000 with the UMD game, a downloadable movie voucher for the PlayStation Network, a code to unlock special in-game content and a 4GB Memory Stick PRO Duo. This pack was released on June 8, 2010, for US$199. Among the exclusive items included, is a FOX Unit camouflage and a Stealth Gun.

=== Downloadable content ===
After the release of Peace Walker, additional content could be downloaded through the Network function in the extras menu. Additional content included uniforms and t-shirt designs for player characters, additional music for the Walkman, new AI boss voices, extra Vocaloid songs and additional magazine covers and two comic magazines for the Japanese versions. Players could also use the NetVocaloid services to create their own Vocaloid files, which could be used as voices for Metal Gear ZEKE, Co-Ops communications, song lyrics, and other uses.

Due to the 2011 Tōhoku earthquake and tsunami, the official servers that host the additional content and NetVocaloid services were taken offline in order to conserve power. They eventually returned online. However, the NetVocaloid services was discontinued on February 28, 2012, while the rest of the downloadable content was discontinued on September 30, 2013. The DLC for the PSP version have since been preserved through third-party websites.

=== HD Edition ===
A graphically enhanced version of Peace Walker was produced for the PlayStation 3 and Xbox 360 in 2011. Titled Metal Gear Solid: Peace Walker — HD Edition, it was included in the Metal Gear Solid HD Collection in North America and Europe, and given a stand-alone retail release in Japan. The HD Edition features numerous improvements such as an increased resolution from 272p to 720p with updated textures and 2D art assets for clearer texts and menus, a 60fps framerate, dual analog controls, improved audio quality, and online trophies/achievements. It also contains some of the downloadable content from the PSP version, such as the 13 additional camo patterns for the player's combat fatigues and Vocaloid add-ons for the AI weapons, already available by default. The PS3 version of Peace Walker allows players to transfer their save data to the PSP version, and vice versa, through the use of the "Transfarring" feature.

Peace Walker was not included in the PlayStation Vita version of the HD Collection due to the PSP version of Peace Walker being available as a digital download on the PlayStation Store. However, the Japanese PS3 version includes a voucher code to download the PSP version.

The version of Peace Walker included within the HD collection was rereleased for modern platforms with the Metal Gear Solid Master Collection Vol. 2.

== Related media ==
Blues of Peace and Kazuhira (平和と和平のブルース, Heiwa to Kazuhira no Burūsu) is a Peace Walker-themed audio drama album released in Japan on September 22, 2010. It features a five-part story written by Hideo Kojima titled "Encounter" (出会い, Deai), which depicts the first meeting between Big Boss and Kazuhira Miller. Other content include additional "Snake & Kaz" drama tracks, music tracks not featured in the Peace Walker soundtrack album and two cover renditions of Japanese songs performed by the voice actors from the game as their characters: Minato no Yōko Yokohama Yokosuka (港のヨーコ・ヨコハマ・ヨコスカ) sung by Tomokazu Sugita (as Miller) and Shōwa Blues (昭和ブルース) performed by Akio Ohtsuka (as Snake). The "Encounter" portion of the album is included in the Japanese version of Metal Gear Solid V: Ground Zeroes with optional English subtitles available.

A novelization of Peace Walker was published in Japan in March 2014, authored by Kenji Yano under the "Hitori Nojima" pen name. Two versions of the novel were published: a standard edition that was sold by itself and a special edition included with the Ground Zeroes premium package sold exclusively by Amazon Japan.

The 2020 film, Monster Hunter's storyline was primarily based on a crossover event in Peace Walker with Monster Hunter Freedom Unite in 2010, in which a military squad briefly faced monsters from the Monster Hunter series, with Milla Jovovich's Artemis and Tony Jaa's Hunter respectively replacing the video game roles of the characters Big Boss and Trenya, the film's director Paul W. S. Anderson stating that "I thought this was great imagery to juxtapose a man with a machine gun [Snake] against the creatures [of Monster Hunter].".

== Reception ==
=== Critical reception ===
Metal Gear Solid: Peace Walker

Aggregate score
Aggregator	Score
Metacritic	89/100

Review scores
Publication	Score
1Up.com	A−
Edge	9/10
Eurogamer	8/10
Famitsu	40/40
GameSpot	9.0/10
GameTrailers	9.1/10
IGN	9.5/10
PSM3	91/100
X-Play	5/5

On Metacritic, the game holds a score of 89, indicating "generally favorable reviews". It was given a perfect score of 40/40 in the May 5, 2010 issue of Japanese magazine Weekly Famitsu; making it the fourteenth game to achieve a perfect score, as well as the first title for the PSP. PSM3 awarded the game 91%, commenting on the game's ability to "take the best bits from every Metal Gear Solid game – the recruitment tricks ... from Portable Ops, the camouflage and multi-player from MGS3: Snake Eater, the stripped-down controls from Metal Gear Solid 4 and the bonus missions ... from VR Missions". IGN's Greg Miller gave the game a score of 9.5/10, stating that it "is probably the biggest game in the Metal Gear series, and it's only on Sony's smallest system".

=== Sales ===
The game sold 574,957 copies after two weeks on sale in Japan. Despite initial hopes from Konami that the game would become an international hit, sales of Peace Walker have been very poor outside Japan. In Europe the game failed to chart in most countries and placed 13th in the UK its first week, and by its third week had fallen out of the top 40. In the United States the game similarly failed to make the top 20 during its first month, selling only 52,000 physical UMD copies, a markedly worse performance than Metal Gear Acid. However, with the PSP's digital content delivery option through PSN, it has been noted that perhaps sales on the PSP should be counted differently since digital downloads on PSP and PSPgo are not counted. Industry analyst Mike Hickey told IGN that poor sales of the PSP platform itself was likely "the main cause" for Peace Walker's unimpressive sales. However, Konami has stated they have a profit of $15 million from sales of Peace Walker and Pro Evolution Soccer games, but they did not provide sales figures for Peace Walker. They have however, said Peace Walker sales helped Metal Gear games sell 1.27 million copies for the quarter. The low sales of Peace Walker overseas was cited by Hideo Kojima as the reason why Kazuhira Miller was omitted from the box art of Metal Gear Solid V: Ground Zeroes for its international release.

As of 2014, Peace Walker has sold 1.99 million copies on the PSP.

=== Awards ===
Peace Walker received the Best of Show and Best PSP Game awards during the 2009 Tokyo Game Show. IGN later put the game in its Best of 2010 list, where it garnered awards for PSP Game of the Year, Most Addictive Game, Best Visuals, Most Bang for Your Buck, Best Story, Best Co-Op and Coolest Atmosphere.
