= Blighttown =

Fictional location in the Dark Souls series

- Dark Souls location
- Upper level area of Blighttown as seen in Dark Souls
- First appearance: Dark Souls (2011)
- Created by: Hidetaka Miyazaki
- Genre: Action role-playing game

In-universe information
- Location: Lordran
- Characters: Chaos Witch Quelaag, Fair Lady, Quelana of Izalith

Blighttown is a fictional underground location in the 2011 video game Dark Souls, created as part of the Dark Souls series by the game director Hidetaka Miyazaki and the development company FromSoftware. It is a swamp and settlement area that both slows and poisons the player character and contains hostile, poisonous enemies.

Blighttown contains the game boss named "Chaos Witch Quelaag" and her unnamed sister, referred to as "Fair Lady" or "Quelaag's Sister", who in the game's lore were mutated daughters of the Witch of Izalith who settled there and attempted to cure a plague that was infecting the residents there. Players must travel through Blighttown to activate one of two Bells of Awakening should they wish to progress through the game. Blighttown is part of a wider trope of poison swamp locations throughout various soulslike games produced by FromSoftware, such as other games of the Dark Souls series, Demon's Souls, and Elden Ring.

Blighttown has been regarded by critics as an infamous area of Dark Souls due to its unique and harsh level of difficulty from its hostile and toxic environment. Critics have also argued that Blighttown is an instance of effective game design because of its level design and pressure towards players. Prior to the release of the remastered version in 2018, it had an infamous reputation due to regularly causing frame rate drops, which combined with its general difficulty had been a massive source of frustration for players.

== Characteristics and appearance ==
Concept art of the lower level swamp area of Blighttown, which differs from the upper level scaffolding area

Blighttown is a major location in the 2011 game Dark Souls, created by the Japanese game company FromSoftware and directed by Hidetaka Miyazaki. It is a hostile settlement area and swamp located beneath the surface that is built on crumbling scaffolding architecture surrounding pillars that hold up the surface location called the Undead Burg.

It is an area that players are required to travel through so that they can activate one of two Bells of Awakening to progress through the game. Blighttown consists of main levels, one upper and one lower; players will start at the former upon arrival from an area called the Depths and descend to the latter. The upper level is a series of walkways leading to the swamp area at the lower level; the swamp inflicts both slowness and poison to the player character upon contact.

The Dark Souls modder Scott "Grimrukh" Mooney revealed from a tweet that the overall Blighttown structure is made up entirely of ten reused wood assets; five of them are panels, three are sticks, and two others are planks. Issy van der Velde of GamesRadar noted how easy it would have been to overlook the reused wood assets because of the level's difficulty and that it is one of many instances of FromSoftware reusing game assets.

The toxic swamp is also a source of many grotesque and hostile monsters, such as those that can breathe fire and another enemy type that shoots poison darts. The location's boss is Chaos Witch Quelaag, who appears as a woman who is fused to a large spider-like monster and attacks using fire and lava. Blighttown also contains several NPCs that the player can interact with, namely Quelana of Izalith and an unnamed sister of Quelaag and Qualana (the latter of whom is encountered only after killing Quelaag), known either as "Quelaag's Sister" or the "Fair Lady". In Dark Souls lore, they are the daughters of Witch of Izalith.

Their mother's botched recreation of the "First Flame" caused her and some of her daughters to be transformed into the Bed of Chaos. Most of her other daughters were transformed into demons; Quelana was the only daughter to escape either fate by the game's events. Quelaag and the Fair Lady moved to Blighttown and gained followings among disease-ridden residents.

The Fair Lady was empathetic for the residents and attempted to cure them by willingly absorbing the sickness onto herself. As a result, the Fair Lady's health deteriorated, causing her to lose her eyesight and be in constant pain. Quelaag sought to help her sister by luring in and killing humans in Blighttown to collect their "Humanity" essences and stockpile them to relieve her sister's sickness and pain. She additionally sought to continue her sister's mission in curing Blighttown's plague.

Similar toxic locations, referred to informally as "poison swamps," have appeared throughout soulslike games produced by FromSoftware, namely Demon's Souls (created before Dark Souls), Dark Souls II, Bloodborne, Dark Souls III, Sekiro: Shadows Die Twice, and Elden Ring. Miyazaki revealed in an interview with the Russian website Igromania that he did not know why he tended to make poison swamp locations a recurring element of his soulslike games.

== Reception ==
Poison swamp locations have long been a staple of soulslike games produced under FromSoftware and therefore have been sources of infamy for many players due to their unique sources of ingame difficulties. Blighttown in particular has been referred to as an infamous swamp location of the soulslike games, with Caelyn Ellis of Eurogamer calling it "the first taste of poison swamps" for many players. She expressed her opinion that it was less the swamps themselves that made the location grueling but more the preceding mazelike areas that are dark, contain dead ends, and are full of hostile enemies like snipers that shoot poison at players.

The GamesRadar writer Austin Wood referred to the Dark Souls location as a "pitch-perfect combination of insects, poison, and dirty water, all steeped in an inimitable air of decay," that has been the frequent subject of memes by players. Kyle Gratton of Screen Rant referred to Blighttown as both aptly named and an introduction to the poison swamp areas in soulslike games for many players, that it was an exceptionally challenging area for first-time players because of a combination of its darkness, difficult navigation, tight and dangerous structures, and enemies that can inflict poison and slowness to their characters. Retro Gamer magazine stated that the level was both the game's worst area and "one of the most frustrating in gaming history", describing it as "horribly designed" and praising the "back door" sequence break that allows players to partially skip it.

Jeffrey Parkin, writing for Polygon, stated that Blighttown is "all kinds of awful" due to its "equal parts dangerous, aggressive, and annoying" enemies and its highly hostile environment. He also noted that its difficulty can, as a result, mislead people to thinking that it is a complex and important location when it primarily serves as a means to progress through the game up to the second Bell of Awakening.

Brenna Hillier of VG247 noted that it was a nightmarish area to the point of being hated by many players because of the frequency of ranged enemies inflicting poison and player character vulnerability to fatal fall damage from the location's platforms. However, they, citing an analysis video on Blighttown by Hamish Black on his YouTube channel "Writing on Games," argued that it was a well-designed game level. Black explained that both the subversion of usual game design by rewarding players for descending through as opposed to ascending through it and the lack of large payoffs at the level's end connecting to the location's wider themes help to make it memorable.

Blighttown was also widely negatively received for being a source of poor ingame performance rates from dropped frame rates in the original releases of Dark Souls, with Nate Hohl of VGR stating that the frame rate drops from the area were at "unplayable levels". Eurogamer writer Thomas Morgan argued that the low frame rates of the level, especially at the elevator system areas, made the location highly frustrating to the point of being subject to widespread criticisms. The frame rate drop at Blighttown was fixed in the 2018 release of Dark Souls: Remastered, meaning that the game could run the level at high frame rates at different gaming platforms. Morgan highlighted that the remastered edition helped to showcase the "ambitious" game level design by FromSoftware as exemplified by Blighttown.

Dimitrios Pokkias, for an academic journal article, claimed that Blighttown served to test players on whether they were willing to challenge themselves towards a descension through the depths. He also said that it intensified feelings of dread and isolation because of its oppressively tight and uneven labyrinth design, containing relentless enemies and toxic environments that further stifled any feeling of safety for the player and connecting to the wider theme of a collapsing world beneath the surface. Pokkias pointed out that players would have been met with immense feelings of relief after escaping the area as they again gain access to their Firelink Shrine hub.
