= Shadow of the Colossus =

2005 video game

- European cover art
- Developer: Sony Computer Entertainment Japan
- Publisher: Sony Computer Entertainment
- Director: Fumito Ueda
- Producer: Kenji Kaido
- Writers: Junichi Hosono; Masashi Kudo; Takashi Izutani
- Composer: Kow Otani
- Platform: PlayStation 2
- Release: NA: October 18, 2005; JP: October 27, 2005; AU: February 16, 2006; EU: February 17, 2006
- Genre: Action-adventure
- Mode: Single-player

Shadow of the Colossus (Note: Released in Japan as Wander and the Colossus (Japanese: ワンダと巨像, Hepburn: Wanda to Kyozō)) is a 2005 action-adventure game developed and published by Sony Computer Entertainment for the PlayStation 2. It takes place in a fantasy setting and follows Wander, a young man who enters an isolated and abandoned region of the realm seeking the power to revive a woman named Mono. The player assumes the role of Wander as he embarks on a mission that might entail Mono's resurrection: to locate and destroy the colossi, sixteen massive beings spread across the forbidden land, which the protagonist traverses by horseback and on foot.

The game was directed by Fumito Ueda and developed at Sony Computer Entertainment's International Production Studio 1, also known as Team Ico, the same development team responsible for the acclaimed PlayStation 2 title Ico, to which the game is considered a spiritual successor. Сonceived as an online multiplayer game titled NICO directly after Ico's completion, Shadow of the Colossus underwent a lengthy production cycle during which it was redeveloped as a single-player title. The team sought to create an outstanding interactive experience by including a distinct visual design, an unorthodox gameplay template, and non-player characters with sophisticated artificial intelligence such as the colossi and Wander's horse, Agro.

Cited as an influential title in the video game industry and one of the best video games of all time, Shadow of the Colossus is often regarded as an important example of video games as serious art due to its minimalist landscape designs, immersive gameplay, and emotional weight of the player character's journey. It received wide critical acclaim by the media and was met with strong sales compared to Ico, due in part to a larger marketing campaign. The game won several awards for its audio, design, and overall quality. A remastered version for the PlayStation 3 was released alongside Ico as The Ico & Shadow of the Colossus Collection in September 2011, developed by Bluepoint Games, who later developed a remake of the game in high definition for the PlayStation 4 in 2018.

== Gameplay ==
Described by several commentators as an action-adventure game, Shadow of the Colossus takes place from a third-person perspective in a three-dimensional (3D) graphic environment and involves combat-based gameplay sequences, as well as platforming and puzzle video game elements. The game's environment is largely presented as a seamless open world. Progression through Shadow of the Colossus occurs in cycles. Beginning at a central point in an expansive landscape, the player seeks out and defeats a colossus, and is then returned to the central point to repeat the process. To find each colossus, Wander may raise his sword while in a sunlit area to reflect beams of light, which will converge when the sword is pointed in the right direction of the next encounter. The player's journey to a colossus seldom follows a direct route: stretches of varied terrain often require that a detour be taken along the way. Most colossi are situated in remote areas, such as atop cliffs or within ancient structures.

Wander climbs the first colossus to stab the sigil on its forehead. The heads-up display shows the character's health and stamina (lower right), as well as the colossus' health (upper left).

Once a colossus is found, the player must discover its weaknesses to defeat it. Each colossus dwells in a unique lair, and in most encounters the player must use some aspects of the current battlefield to their advantage, a necessity that becomes more pronounced as the game progresses. The first two battles take place on simple, vast, flat areas of land, wherein the player's only goal is to discover how to scale the colossi and attack their weak points. However, the majority of the following fourteen battles require that the player make use of the surrounding environment.

Every colossus has at least one weak point, symbolized by a glowing sigil that can be illuminated and identified by the sword's reflected light. Each colossus has areas covered with fur or protruding ledges, which Wander may use to grip and scale the colossus while it thrashes about in an attempt to dislodge him. Wander has a limited stamina gauge that decreases as he hangs onto the colossus; the player thus must act quickly when they scale the creature. Aside from the colossi, who are the only enemies of the game, the environment is inhabited by natural animals. Only one species, however, has an effect on gameplay: eating the tail of a certain kind of lizard increases Wander's stamina gauge. Likewise, the player may find fruit that increases Wander's maximum health.

Wander's horse, Agro, plays a large role in the game. Aside from her capacity as a means of transportation, Agro enables the player to fight from horseback, a critical avenue to defeating some of the colossi. However, the game contains many environments that players cannot traverse by horse, and colossi are often found in areas within deep water or beyond large obstacles that must be scaled. Agro cannot travel beyond these, and when separated from Wander by such obstacles, cannot participate in the following battle. While throughout the game, Wander's equipment consists of only a sword and a bow with arrows, in subsequent playthroughs players may access bonus weapons and in-game features after finishing optional Time Attack trials, which allow the battles with the colossi to be replayed with a restricted time limit.

== Synopsis ==
=== Setting ===
Presented through a minimalistic narrative, Shadow of the Colossus eschews disclosure of detailed information about the backstories and interrelationships of its characters to the player. The game takes place in a fantasy world, wherein a vast and unpopulated peninsula, known as the Forbidden Land, serves as the main setting for the game's events. Separated from the outside realm by a distant mountain range to its north and sea to the south and east, the area contains ruins and remnants of ancient structures, an indication that it had formerly been a settlement.

The only point of entry to the region is a small cleft in the mountains to the north that leads to a massive stone bridge. This bridge spans half the distance of the landscape and terminates at a large temple called the "Shrine of Worship" located at its center. It is, however, forbidden to enter the land, which includes diverse geographical features, such as lakes, plateaus, canyons, caves, and deserts in addition to human-made structures.

=== Characters ===
Wander standing near Mono. Long hair served as a foundational aspect of both Wander and Mono's designs, and in the latter's case was meant to provide a visual contrast to Ico character Yorda.

The protagonist of the game is Wander (ワンダ, Wanda; voiced by Kenji Nojima), a young man whose goal is to resurrect a girl named Mono (モノ; voiced by Hitomi Nabatame). The only established fact regarding Mono is that she was a maiden who was sacrificed because she was believed to have a cursed destiny. Assisting Wander in his quest to revive her is his loyal horse, Agro (アグロ, Aguro), who serves as his sole ally in defeating the colossi; the English-language version of the game refers to Agro as a male steed, although director Fumito Ueda said that he saw Wander's horse as female. Wander also receives aid from an entity called Dormin (ドルミン, Dorumin; voiced by Kazuhiro Nakata and Kyōko Hikami). The story revolves around these characters but features a small supporting cast, represented by Lord Emon (エモン; voiced by Naoki Bandō) and his men.

Speaking with two voices at once (one male and one female), Dormin is a mysterious, disembodied entity. According to legends of the game's world, Dormin has the power to revive the dead; this premise serves as the driving cause for Wander's entrance upon the forbidden land, as he seeks the being's assistance in reviving Mono. Dormin offers to revive her in exchange for Wander destroying the sixteen colossi. One of the commentators of the game's plot speculated that the name "Dormin", which spells "Nimrod" backwards, serves as a reference to the body of the biblical King Nimrod which was cut up and scattered.

Lord Emon is a shaman who narrates a vision in the game's introduction that vaguely explains the origin of the land to which Wander has come and establishes that entry to this place is forbidden. As portrayed by the game, he possesses vast knowledge about the nature and containment of Dormin, and wields the ability to use powerful magic. He has a small group of warriors at his command, and is pursuing Wander to prevent the use of "the forbidden spell", the rite that involves the destruction of the sixteen colossi and the restoration of Dormin's power.

The colossi are armored, most often enormous creatures with forms ranging from various humanoids to predatory animals, and live in all manner of surroundings and environments, including underwater and flying through the air. Their bodies are a fusion of organic and inorganic parts such as rock, earth, and architectural elements, some of which are weathered or fractured. Some colossi are peaceful and will only attack when provoked, whereas others are aggressive and will attack on sight. Inhabiting specific locations in the forbidden land, they do not venture outside their own territory. Once slain they will remain where fallen, as a mound of earth and rock vaguely resembling the original colossus. A pillar of light marks the location of each colossus after they are defeated. The Latin names of the colossi, though spread throughout fan related media, are not official and are never referred to within the game.

=== Plot ===
Wander enters the Forbidden Lands and travels across a long bridge on his horse, Agro. After they reach the entrance to the Shrine of Worship, Wander, who has carried with him the body of Mono, brings her to an altar in the temple. A moment later, several humanoid shadow creatures appear and approach Wander before he easily dismisses them with a wave of the Ancient Sword in his possession.

After the shadow creatures are vanquished, the disembodied voice of Dormin manifests within the shrine and expresses surprise at the fact that Wander possesses the weapon. Wander explains the plight that led him to seek the forbidden land and asks that Dormin return Mono's soul to her body. Dormin offers to grant Wander's request under the condition that he complete a rite designed to destroy the sixteen idols lining the temple's hall. To that end, Wander must use his sword to slay each of the idol's physical incarnations — the colossi — whose presence ranges across the vast expanse outside the temple. Although warned by Dormin that he may have to pay a great price to revive Mono, Wander sets out to search the land for the colossi and destroy them.

An aspect of Wander's mission that is unknown to him is that the colossi contain portions of Dormin's own essence, scattered long ago to render the entity powerless. As Wander kills each colossus, a released fragment of Dormin enters his body. Over time, the signs of Wander's deterioration from the gathered essence start to appear: his skin becomes paler, his hair darker, and his face is increasingly covered by dark veins. The outcome of the battle with the twelfth colossus leads to a reveal of a group of warriors that has been pursuing Wander, led by Emon. Urged to hurry with his task by Dormin, Wander soon heads off to defeat the sixteenth and final colossus, the largest upright colossus. On the way to this confrontation, he rides horseback across a long bridge which begins to collapse as he is halfway across, but Agro manages to throw Wander over to the other side before falling into the distant river below.

Soon after, Wander goes on to defeat the final colossus as Emon's company arrives in the Shrine of Worship to witness the last temple idol crumble. Wander appears back in the temple soon after, the signs of his corruption readily apparent: his skin is pallid, his eyes glow silver, and a pair of short horns have sprouted from his head. Emon condemns Wander for stealing the Ancient Sword and trespassing into the Forbidden Lands and for using the "forbidden" spell (likely referring to his killing of the colossi). Emon orders his warriors to kill the "possessed" man as he approaches Mono and finally falls once stabbed through the heart by one of Emon's men. However, a newly whole Dormin takes control of Wander's body and transforms into a shadowy giant. While his men flee, Lord Emon casts the Ancient Sword into a pool at the back of the temple's hall to evoke a whirlwind of light. The supernatural vortex consumes Dormin and Wander, which seals Dormin within the temple once again. As Emon and his warriors escape, the bridge that leads to the temple collapses behind them, and its destruction forever isolates the forbidden land from the rest of the world. Although he has condemned Wander for his actions prior to their encounter, Emon expresses hope that Wander may be able to atone for his crimes one day should he have survived.

Back in the temple, Mono awakens and finds Agro limping into the temple with an injured hind leg. Mono follows Agro to the pool into which Wander and Dormin were pulled by Emon's spell, where she finds a male infant with short horns on his head. Mono takes the child with her, following the horse to higher levels of the Shrine of Worship, and arrives at a secret garden within the shrine.

== Development ==
=== Origin ===
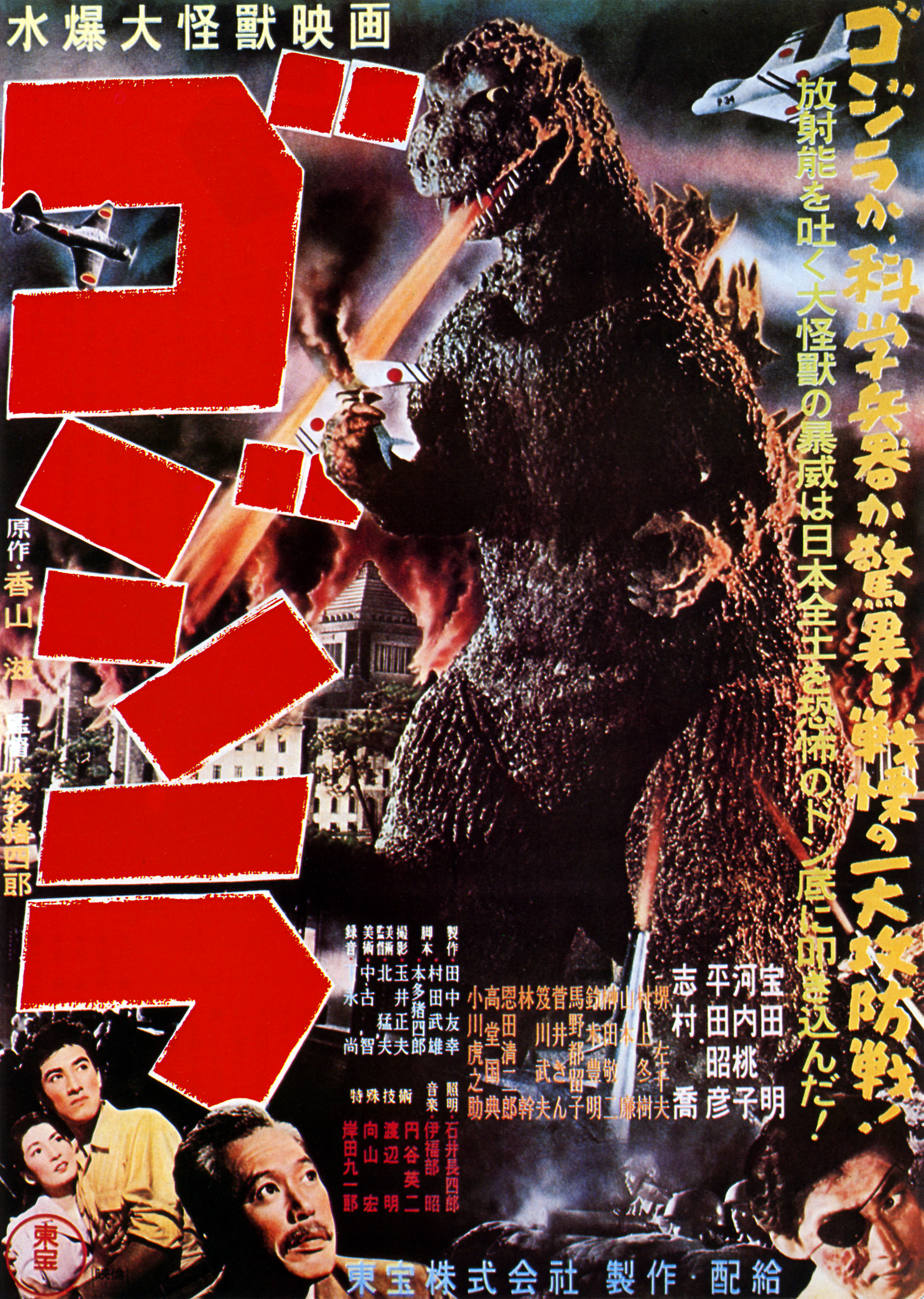
The monster movie genre, of which the original Godzilla film (1954 theatrical poster pictured above) is a famous example, served as a source of inspiration for the concept of Shadow of the Colossus.

Shadow of the Colossus was developed by Sony Computer Entertainment Japan. Director Fumito Ueda and producer Kenji Kaido return alongside the rest of the team from the development of Ico. The game originated from one of Ueda's concepts that he developed directly after the team submitted Ico, released in late 2001 for the PlayStation 2, for publication. As the basis of their subsequent game had not been decided, Ueda examined "a number of old ideas kicking around in my head ... that couldn't be realized under previous circumstances". After a brief review of those avenues, Ueda chose to explore one that aligned with his own preferences as a game player. Ueda cited The Legend of Zelda series as an influence, as he grew up wanting to make a game like Zelda and designed the Colossi bosses like "inverted Zelda dungeons."

Ueda envisioned a work with an underlying motif of "cruelty as a means of expression". He felt that this theme was widely featured in contemporary titles such as Grand Theft Auto III and wanted to use it in a game that he designed. In a discussion with Kaido, Ueda observed that he had played a variety of video games containing battles with large bosses that the player must shoot from a distance to defeat. Ueda believed that the boss sequences of those games could be streamlined if the player character was able to approach and climb the oversized opponents to kill them with a close range weapon. Accordingly, he chose to base the game around the player character's encounters with enormous fictional creatures, a premise that stemmed from Ueda's childhood fascination with monster movies. This led to an emphasis on the inclusion of a large-scale adventure in the title, an element which Ueda regarded as influential in the shaping of the game's stylistic identity.

Originally, the team considered Ueda's idea alongside another concurrently developed game. According to Ueda, the game was unrelated to his former concept, and the team did not give it a working title or outline its design while it was in development. Ueda recognized the finished iteration of their second title as, "in many ways, a game for boys and men"; conversely, the separately produced game was fashioned to appeal more to a female audience. Its contents, interface and thematic focus differed significantly from those that would ultimately manifest in the team's next game after Ico. The untitled game did not employ 3D graphics, whereas Team Ico applied them to their published game. The team eventually scrapped their plans for a counterpart title to Ueda's intended game, which was advanced into further development.

Prior to the start of the project, Team Ico assessed the opportunity to establish it as a sequel to their first game. This suggestion was opposed by certain staff members who argued that the story and gameplay of their preceding title were largely self-contained, and that the existence of consumer demand for a new Ico game was questionable. According to Ueda, Team Ico assumed that the creation of levels for a single-player game akin to Ico necessitated the construction of elaborate puzzles, a practice that the staff wanted to eschew. Following lengthy deliberations, they decided not to pursue a sequel to Ico and to produce a standalone game provisionally dubbed NICO (a portmanteau of ni, 2 in Japanese, and "Ico"). The team initially agreed to develop NICO as an online multiplayer game that, unlike Ico, "wouldn't require complex level design". Their foundational goal, according to Kaido, was to create a technology demo that represented a tentative rendition of the game's fictional world and features. Development commenced immediately after the December 2001 release of Ico's Japanese version.

=== Early prototypes ===
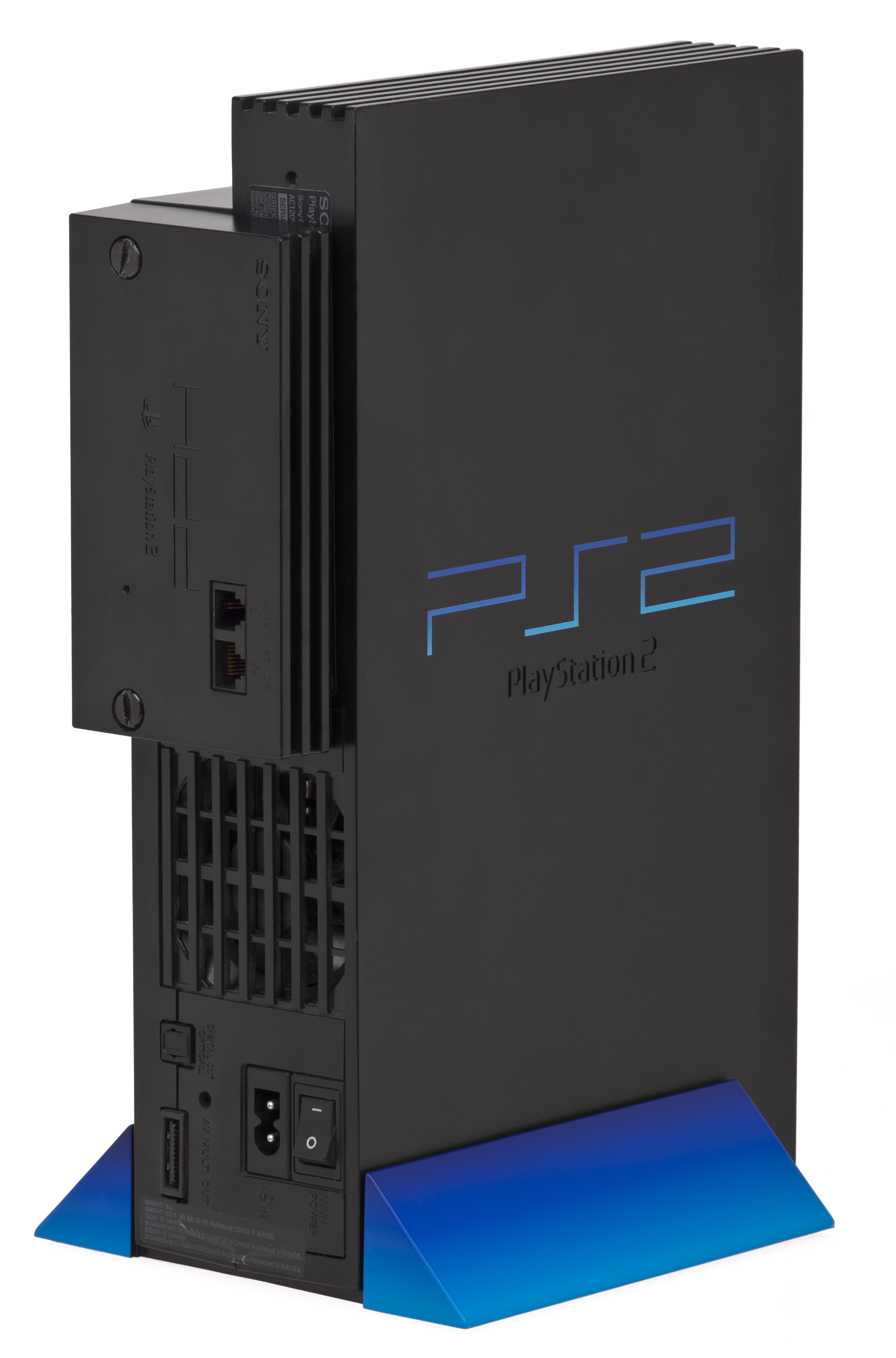
Team Ico produced the technology demo for NICO, the initial online multiplayer-focused incarnation of Shadow of the Colossus, using the native graphical capabilities of the PlayStation 2 (shown here with its Network Adaptor attached).

To develop the concept video for NICO, Team Ico formed a small internal group, which was composed of Ueda, one of Ico's designers and a roughly 10-person animation team. Their objective was to deliver "[a] movie with an extremely final form" that could serve as a visual template for the finalized game. The first storyboard that outlined the video was drafted in January 2002, and the actual short film was completed that May. It depicted a group of three masked, horned boys who rode horseback across a vast landscape and attacked a towering being reminiscent of the second boss in Shadow of the Colossus. The video was visualized in the Ico game engine and was rendered in real-time on the PlayStation 2 hardware. With those techniques, the team aimed to estimate the extent to which the platform's capabilities allowed the realization of their vision.

According to Kaido, the team deemed the resulting video to have attained a very high level of completion, and thus was able to use it as a reference point throughout the game's production. Although they subsequently modified the game's visuals from those of the demonstration reel, its themes of "fighting a giant enemy" and "[exploring] a giant field" carried over into the final game design. The demo indicated elements that were excluded from the released game. Among these was a showcased gameplay mechanism wherein one of the colossus' attackers who had scaled and killed it proceeded to mount his approaching horse by leaping onto its back from the entity's corpse. The video was later exhibited at many trade shows, such as the 2006 D.I.C.E. Summit in Las Vegas where Kaido and Ueda retrospectively discussed the game's development with Lorne Lanning.

In June 2002, a small group of staff at Team Ico started to build a prototype of NICO for testing purposes. In his role as producer, Kaido tasked the team with the inclusion of technological features that he recognized as important milestones of the development. One of the challenges issued by Kaido involved the creation of "organic collision deformation", a term that alluded to his concept of realistic character physics in relation to the movement of the colossi. For instance, if a colossus' limb was currently horizontal, Kaido expected the player to be able to run across the limb as though it were any other flat surface. Ueda and Team Ico programmers spent over six months to produce a working version of this functionality. They began by adding a character to a virtual environment where the figure was enabled to climb a pole-like object. One of the team's priorities at the time was to code a physics-based simulation of scenarios where characters were "being shaken off or narrowly avoided being stomped on".

In May 2003, Team Ico assembled a demonstrational build of NICO and presented it at a production meeting. Full development of the game was sanctioned directly after it was pitched, and commenced in the same month. That year, the NICO technology demo was shown across Sony's foreign offices among a lineup of prospective PlayStation 2 titles, and its exposure excited the spectators. Although the team attempted to work on the game in secrecy, at a certain point images of NICO's horseriding characters were leaked onto the Internet. Their circulation led enthusiasts to speculate about what they perceived as a sequel to Ico. According to Ueda, the team reused elements of Ico's character designs for NICO to expedite the production of the concept video and minimize its costs. He asserted that NICO was not related to Ico despite their stylistic similarities, and that his colleagues did not identify the former game as a sequel. However, contemporary and retrospective sources described Team Ico's second game as both a spiritual successor and prequel to Ico.

The staff used player feedback to advance the testing of the "organic collision deformation" system by inputting simple objects to experiment its capabilities. Although Team Ico had conducted an elaborate research of the game's technological framework, they did not finish its validation when they entered the production phase. After evaluating the limited number of personnel that was involved with NICO as well as their professional profiles, Team Ico concluded that they were not qualified to deliver an online-only game. They then resolved to abandon that direction and to reformulate NICO into a single-player title. The team discarded Ico's development tools that they had used at the outset of the project and moved to write new programming utilities. Relatedly, they opted to create a dedicated game engine for the title in lieu of that from Ico. While the staff had intended to reuse the development practices that they had employed in Ico to proceed with NICO, the departure from the technology of the older game meant that its successor "was [built] almost from the ground up again".

=== Production ===
After a lengthy preparatory phase, the game's production began in September 2003. Publisher SCEI gave the project a greater amount of development time, funding and creative freedom in comparison to the resources of the Ico team, measures that arose from the company's recognition of that game's critical success. Kaido also noted that he and Ueda endeavored to expand the production with newly recruited staff. They sought out prospective collaborators, particularly artistic specialists, through job advertisements they had distributed across the Japanese trade media and via word of mouth publicity. From a pool of five hundred applicants, ten were subsequently enlisted to work on the game; however, Ueda felt that only one or two satisfied his criteria, as he expected every facet of the title to be as well-crafted as possible. Kaido's concern during production was to guarantee Team Ico's ability to meet their schedule and budget commitments while ensuring that they had the opportunity "to create everything Ueda was aiming for within the amount of time we had".

Kaido remarked that his colleagues needed to "start transitioning into full production", as they had devoted extensive efforts to the preparation of the game's technology. Initially, the team was unable to ascertain the level of sophistication with which they could materialize their ideas in the game. Character designer Shinpei Suzuki recalled that they started to develop the game in an experimental fashion and made progress through trial and error. As the team began, the designers issued instructions that outlined the programmable properties of the colossi enemies–along with the means of their defeat–and that were meant to be gradually implemented into the title. The process in which the staff attempted to introduce those concepts typically led them to encounter problems with their realization, which entailed a revision of previously submitted work. According to Kaido, during the development of the colossi the team struggled to choreograph certain motions of the enemies in line with the expectations of the personnel. To remedy this defect, Team Ico reworked their original programming solution that animated the movements of the colossi in the game. Suzuki described the team's early accomplishments as empirical; in the aforementioned period, the staff would routinely test and adjust the game's anticipated components until confirming them to function properly.

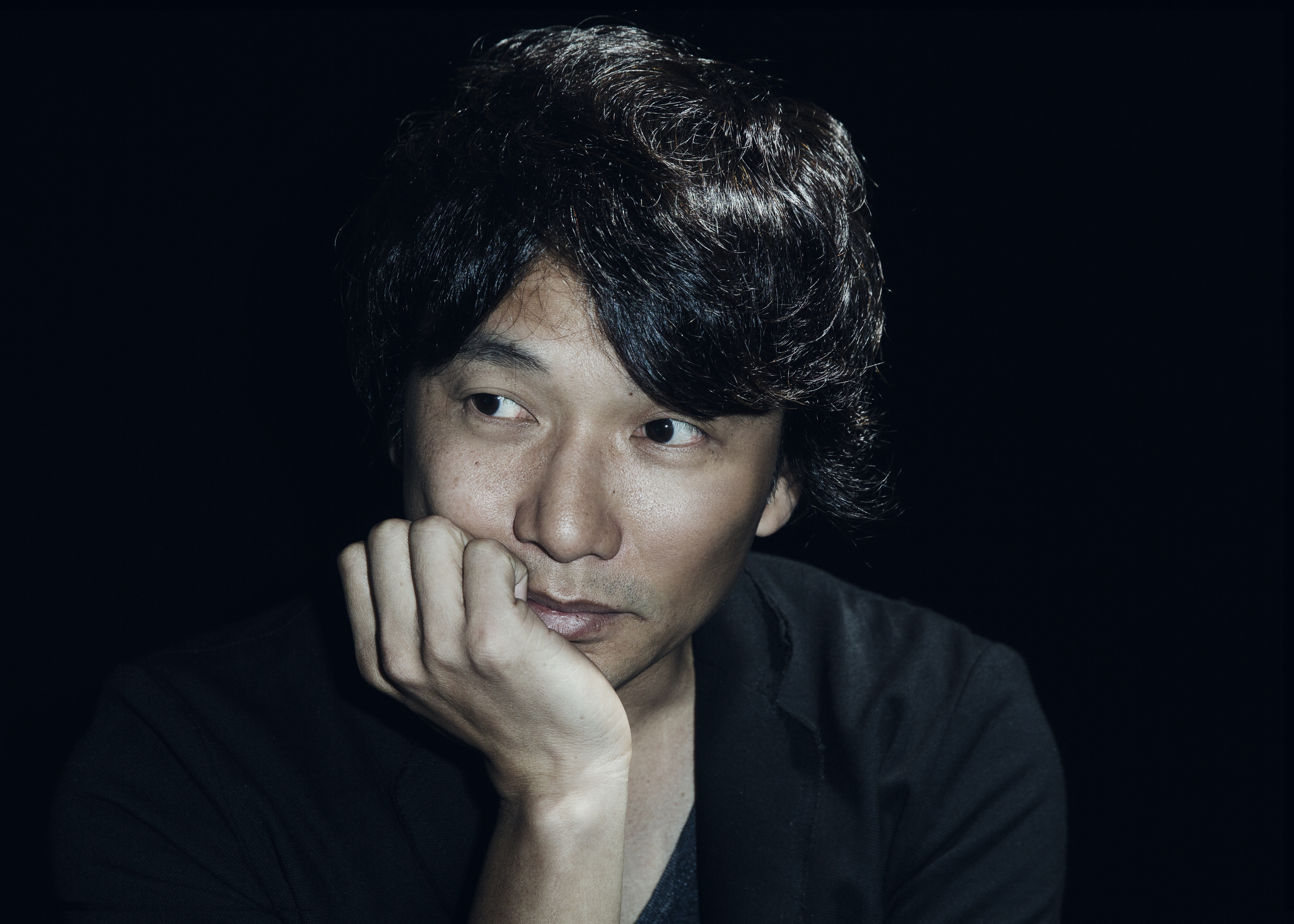
Director Fumito Ueda was instrumental in the creative design of Shadow of the Colossus.

To plan out the design of the game's visual elements, Ueda used 3D computer graphics software instead of sketching them on paper. His rationale was that the necessity to transform the hand-drawn artwork into polygonal shapes in the latter case would cause the reproduced assets' level of detail to be vastly reduced from that of the source images. In defining the inclusion of the game's environments, Ueda outlined his suggestions to the team's scenery designers who then worked to apply them to the title. After the locations of the individual colossi were visualized in the game's engine, the group began to compose the game's setting by adding intermediary areas between the enemies' lairs. During development, the size of the game world frequently changed as the team reorganized the connective material. Environmental designer Kouji Hasegawa noted that the scenery graphics were drastically reworked on several occasions because Ueda urged him and his colleagues to reinforce the light tones in the coloring of the areas and to accentuate "the brightness and the saturation of the textures". Like Ico, the game displays a distinct style of lighting. The game engine utilizes elements such as desaturated colors, motion blur and partial high dynamic range rendering; and it places heavy emphasis on bloom lighting.

As Team Ico operationalized the game's physics-oriented features, they continued to refine them with reference to the Ico-inspired character designs from the NICO concept video. After the systems that modeled the player's interactions with the colossi and generated the game world were established, the team integrated the human models from the prior versions of the game into a newly-designed, singular figure. The necessity for the protagonist to freely traverse a 3D space prompted the team to abandon the presentational format of Ico, whose gameplay is viewed from a fixed perspective, and to introduce a camera system with a third-person view of the character. After the inclusion of the player character's ability to perform climbing maneuvers, the team enabled the game to alter his physical response to instances of falling from a moving colossus; the reaction would vary depending on the distance that the protagonist's body traveled to the landing point. According to Ueda, the moment when he saw the actual effect of that simulation led him to believe that the project offered an exceptional play experience when compared to preceding video games.

Character animation is accomplished via key frame animation, the game's simulated physics and inverse kinematics (IK)–a method derived from the field of robotics. Some of the game's characters are procedurally animated; this technique is sparsely used due to the limited computational capacity of the PlayStation 2. While the basic movements of the character models were animated by hand, their physical interactions are simulated in real time by the game's physics engine. The generated data is input to the IK system to animate the joints of a model, and, by extension, its entire body. In the process, the system estimates the displacement, angle and the direction of the finalized motion, and the model is positioned in the environment according to these calculations. As a result, predefined animations are blended with physical effects to create lifelike character movement: for example, the player character behaves like a swinging pendulum as he hangs onto a colossus while it tries to dislodge him. As applied to the protagonist's horse, the technology enables the character to adjust its posture when on uneven surfaces for added realism, a feature that extends to the colossi.

With regard to the colossi, Team Ico were keen to ensure that their motions were plausible, and strove to accurately convey the massiveness and energy level of the creatures. The colossi were programmed to react to the occurrence of specific player-driven events within one of the "sensor" areas set by the artificial intelligence (AI) of the enemies across their surrounding territory. For example, if the player character is at ground level and approaches an armed colossus from the front, the creature brandishes its weapon against him. As opposed to a hard-coded program, the colossi's AI could be fine-tuned for each of the game's scenes. Team Ico also developed AI-enabled movement algorithms for protagonist's horse, which was conceived as a realistic representation of its real-life counterparts. This solution allows the horse to occasionally ignore the player's commands and to be proactive in order to avoid visible sources of danger within its surroundings. However, Ueda admitted that the team had to seek a balance in how often Agro did not respond to player input so as to not sacrifice playability in the pursuit of realism.

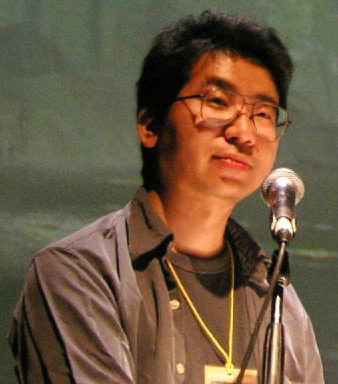
Producer Kenji Kaido worked to ensure that the Shadow of the Colossus team was able to meet the creative challenges of the game's production.

Kaido admitted that Team Ico's ambitions for the game were partly unimplementable with the PlayStation 2 hardware, and that the team "[lost] sight of the cardinal rules of game design" several times during production. One of the issues that caused them to discard assets already added to the game was the variety of the colossi. Ueda initially intended to incorporate 48 colossi in NICO, but their amount was afterward reduced to 24 when he concluded that his former vision was unrealizable. Eventually, Ueda settled on the released game's 16 beings due to a concern that the game would not achieve the desired quality level if the previous number of the colossi was maintained. To choose the colossi that were negligible, Team Ico estimated their level of completion at the time and the degree of overlap between the anticipated method of defeating a given entity and a strategy reserved for another enemy. Other omitted elements of the game included a two-player gameplay mode, excluded due to insufficient development time, as well as a simulation of a full day cycle and weather variations, excised because of problems that Ueda attributed to the PlayStation 2's memory capacity. Despite the design-related difficulties, Kaido remarked that the staff managed to reaffirm their creative priorities repeatedly after they had consulted the NICO technology demo.

As the time passed, the development proved to be a strenuous endeavor for the staff, and fan expectations for Team Ico's second game placed them under pressure to surpass their past work in Ico. The team's morale was challenged by Ueda's perfectionistic tendencies, as he was often demanding in his requests for revisions of the game's components. According to both him and Kaido, Ueda's insistence on exercising personal supervision over the game's artistic direction added to the setbacks that the team encountered as they continued to work on the project. Thomas Wilborgh of the Swedish gaming magazine LEVEL afterward commented that Ueda's hands-on role in the creation of his games was evidence of his familiarity with every aspect pertinent to their development, and that Ueda was able to command the respect of individual personnel because of that personal quality. At the height of production, Ueda stayed in the office after hours to make progress in contributing content to the game; Kaido also refused to leave work early when he felt it necessary to provide other team members who worked overtime with moral support. Kaido commended the staff's dedication in retrospect, as he believed that their output allowed Team Ico to "[stick] to the schedule in the end", despite the reductive alterations that the game had undergone over the course of its production.

In late 2004, following two years of development during which NICO was listed on Sony's internal schedules for forthcoming products under that respective name, Team Ico changed the game's designation to its final Japanese title. SCEI's European branch was determined to publish the game under the name Ico 2 in its associated regions. However, Sony Computer Entertainment America proposed that the game's original title, translated as Wanda and the Colossus, be rebranded as Shadow of the Colossus for a North American release. In naming the game, Ueda intended to move away from the abstract title of Ico to a simpler and more straightforward product name. This resulted in the game's native title, which offered greater public appeal and clarity than that of Ico, and was striking from the perspective of Japanese consumers. Shadow of the Colossus was unveiled in early September 2004–along with Genji: Dawn of the Samurai–via an announcement on the official Japanese PlayStation website. On September 10, SCEI held an official press conference where Shadow of the Colossus was presented by Ueda and Kaido to Japanese trade journalists. The event was accompanied by a live orchestral performance of selected music from the game's soundtrack, which drew interested visitors to the showcase. Later that month, a trailer of Shadow of the Colossus was revealed at the 2004 Tokyo Game Show, where Sony alluded to the game's tentative release date in the next year.

At an internal meeting in February 2005, Team Ico decided to monitor player feedback to the unveiling of Shadow of the Colossus in an effort to correct the game's deficiencies. That April, Sony announced the game's American title, and by the next month, Western video game-oriented media outlets such as GameSpot and 1Up.com had received a pre-release playable version of Shadow of the Colossus and reported their early impressions about the game. Also in May, the same version of the game–estimated by a Japanese online news source to be at "60 percent of completion" by that point–was exhibited at E3 2005, and, according to Edge, attracted "heavy crowds, all clamouring to get their hands on and heads around its sheer enormity". However, several spectators complained about the low frame rate of the title, and Andrew Vestal of Electronic Gaming Monthly, commenting on the game's status in a preview, cited problems that pertained to its collision detection. Ueda later admitted the existence of several flaws in the design of Shadow of the Colossus; at the same time, he had asserted that the staff's adherence to the central ideas that they had envisioned meant that the game's elements eventually coalesced into a coherent product.

By July 2005, Team Ico entered the last phase of Shadow of the Colossus' development. They had pledged to improve the game's frame rate, and worked to optimize its physics engine and the rendering of the game world. Ueda noted that the finished version of the "organic collision deformation" technology differed drastically from the iteration that the team originally developed. SCEI demonstrated Shadow of the Colossus at the 2005 Tokyo Game Show to a positive reception, and Jō Kirian of ITmedia reported that a long line of attendees queued up near the game's exposition stand at the venue. Ueda told Eurogamer after the convention ended that Team Ico deemed the game to be "pretty much fixed as it is" and that they did not have plans to supplement the game with new content. Although they had repeatedly missed deadlines and exceeded budget limitations, Kaido thought that the implementation of the game's major features instilled pride in his colleagues. According to Ueda, Shadow of the Colossus ultimately involved a 40-person team. After three and a half years of development, Team Ico completed the Japanese and North American versions of Shadow of the Colossus in September 2005.

=== Design ===
For Shadow of the Colossus, Team Ico adopted a more sophisticated template for their creative process than Ico's principal idea of "design by subtraction"; under the latter approach, they removed the title's integrated elements that detracted players from its reality. Ueda felt that Ico's analogous structure to an adventure game resulted in its limited interactivity, and he wanted Shadow of the Colossus to be more player-driven by comparison. To that end, he sought to ensure that the game provided players with agency both sporadically–in that they would be able to trigger in-game scenarios by their own efforts–and on an overarching scale–by the creation of emergent solutions to the gameplay. Furthermore, the player can manipulate the camera during cutscenes, a functionality designed to maintain the impression of controllability–and therefore, the consumers' interest–in those otherwise self-directed segments of the game. At the same time, Ueda strove to make the title accessible to people who did not play video games by simplifying its controls and other components.

Kaido and Ueda aimed to challenge the contemporary trends of the video game industry, and they thus fashioned the battles with the boss-like colossi characters as an unconventional rendition of video game levels. The quality of the battles with the colossi was of critical importance to Ueda, who saw them as an outgrowth of his appreciation for boss fights in video games as a player. During development, the team considered including fights with smaller enemies beyond the colossi and with "optional Colossi you wouldn't need to defeat" in the game. Those suggestions were rejected due to Ueda's belief that the title's play value would not benefit from those confrontations. Relatedly, Shadow of the Colossus was made exclusive of human non-playable characters (NPCs), although the team placed discoverable small-sized animals in the game per Ueda's specifications. The creation of the colossi, as the focus of the game's separate segments, required Team Ico to provide input across disciplines. The ensuing distribution of duties between the title's artists, animators, programmers and designers meant that they needed to make their contributions to the game intercompatible so as not to engender design issues.

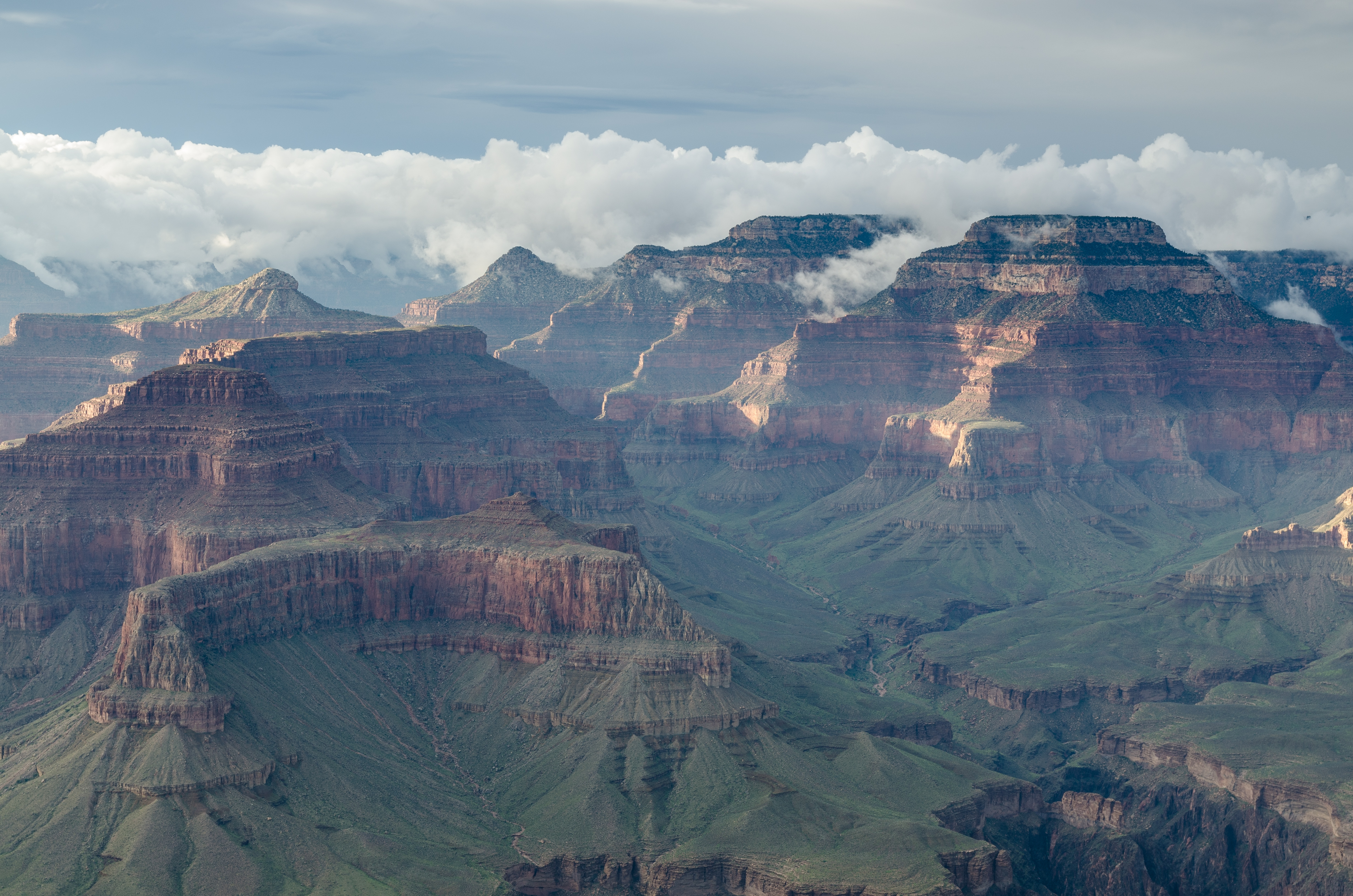
Geographical features of the American Southwest's natural attractions, such as the Grand Canyon (Arizona, United States), informed the appearance of Shadow of the Colossus' environments.

Ueda wanted the game's presentation to be outstanding and to exhibit "the density of a painting". He visited geographical landmarks of the Southwestern United States such as the Grand Canyon and Death Valley to seek inspiration for the game's setting. The modeling of the game's environments, whose arrangement stemmed from independently constructed battlegrounds tied to each of the colossi, followed a pattern that Kouji Hasegawa described as "a repeating cycle of creating, testing and tuning". The team initially struggled to carry out Ueda's instructions for the shaping of the scenery and altered the game's locations frequently so as to find a satisfactory design for the setting. After researching several visual arts genres, Team Ico crafted a distinct graphical style that utilized both grayish and light color tones to underscore the game's ambiance, identified by Ueda as "firm-feeling". This aesthetic was exemplified by the game mechanics of searching the setting for the colossi, which came from Ueda's desire to determine a straightforward and visually defined reference for the player. He remarked that the game's completed graphics–as well as its gameplay principles–were produced similarly to those of Ico, as an invocation of stylistic parallels between the two titles.

Among the game's characters, the appearance of the human figures was established prior to that of colossi. According to Ueda, Wander and Mono, while fitting the literary trope of "a little boy and a little girl", were not meant to occupy archetypical roles, and the team attempted to foster a "cool" image in molding Wander's gestures. The colossi's design was derived from that of the gameplay, and was meant to invoke a simultaneous sense of peculiarity and realism while not indicating their true nature. Ueda was keen to achieve a convincing depiction of the colossi's scale, which was underlined by the addition of a climbable fur surface to the creatures. However, the complexity of the game's physics engine meant that the faster colossi needed to be smaller as well. Another concern for Ueda was to materialize a unique connection between the colossi, as NPCs, and the game's audience, by ensuring that victory over an enemy evoked a conflicted sensation in the player. In exploring this aspect, Ueda combined a scene that portrayed the death of a colossus with a melancholic song from a film soundtrack. He presented the edited sequence to the staff, who "burst out laughing. To have a scene like that ... seemed like a mistake to them". Nevertheless, Ueda resolved to carry the idea over to the rest of the colossi battles, which he asserted to be a well-judged choice after he had asked players to voice their opinions on that matter.

While Ico's plot is told partly through dialogue, Shadow of the Colossus avoids that narrative device and relies more on nonverbal storytelling. Ueda strove to clearly characterize the game's setting within the constraints of the target platform, and thus devised a simple storyline for the title. As part of his approach to the game's environmental design, Ueda emphasized the motif of a "lonely hero" in the game, in keeping with the atmosphere of Ico. Ueda explained that his design practices, together with the technological limitations of the time, meant that he favored "characters that live inside their own heads instead of having complicated relationships with other characters". At the same time, he was interested in the concept of companionship between an AI-controlled character and the player. This led him to construct a partnership between Wander and Agro, reminiscent of the connection between Ico's titular hero and Yorda, an NPC. Based in part on Ueda's own experiences in horseriding, the team prepared a detailed set of maneuvers that Wander could execute in concert with Agro, and gave Agro a crucial supportive role during gameplay. Kaido was especially satisfied with Agro's implementation, and Ueda was inspired by the interplay between the horse and the protagonist to focus his following game, The Last Guardian, on a similar relationship.

=== Music ===
Shadow of the Colossus: Roar of the Earth (Original Game Soundtrack)

Soundtrack album by Kow Otani
- Released: December 7, 2005
- Recorded: Victor Studio
- Genre: Video game soundtrack
- Length: 75:36
- Label: King Records

The development of Shadow of the Colossus' music started alongside that of the game itself. Ueda's core idea was to use a "dynamic and gallant" score in the game, akin to traditional Hollywood film music. The team's goal with the soundtrack of Shadow of the Colossus, as with Ico, was to differentiate it from conventional video game music, and to "express restraint with regards to emotional expression as much as possible". Inspired by the opening theme from Silent Hill, Ueda also intended the soundtrack to reflect a melancholic ambiance as well as the history of the game's setting, based on the narrative's elements of death and resurrection. His other objective was to provide the game with compositions that adopted an elevated and dignified tone to underline the grandiose nature of the colossi.

The soundtrack was composed by Kow Otani, who had been previously responsible for the music to the 1990s-era Gamera films and a number of anime titles. Within the video game medium, his past work consisted of the soundtracks to the PlayStation 2 flight simulator Sky Odyssey and the PlayStation scrolling shooter Philosoma. In selecting the composer of the game, Ueda sought to deviate from the conceptual perspective of the score for Ico, written by Michiru Oshima. Unlike Ico, which Ueda saw as a game that equally attracted male and female audiences, he saw Shadow of the Colossus as a work that appealed more to male players. This led Ueda to hire a male composer for the game. The versatility of Otani's musical output and his understanding of folk instruments were further factors in his recruitment by Ueda.

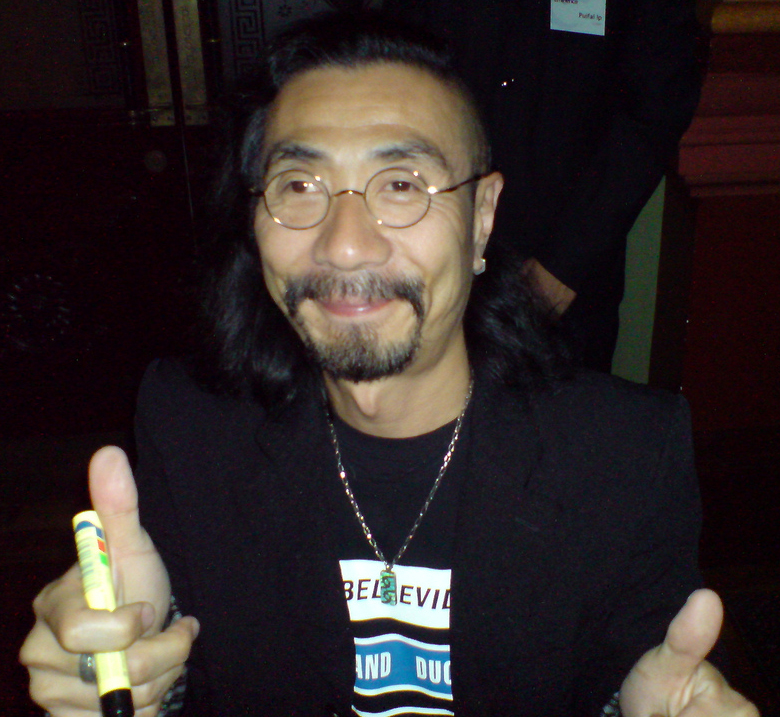
Kow Otani composed the soundtrack of Shadow of the Colossus.

Otani began work on Shadow of the Colossus at the time of its inception as NICO, and Ueda characterized the soundtrack's development as difficult due to the protracted creation of its associated game. The development staff's enthusiasm in bringing the game to completion motivated Otani to deliver tracks with which he meant to convey a sense of wonder, and he drew inspiration from the portrayal of Wander's determination to revive Mono in the game. The team worked with Otani through many meetings to develop satisfactory musical themes for the game's individual colossi. According to Ueda, one of the challenges of the music's production was to incorporate compositions whose melody and structure would adapt in response to the changing circumstances of gameplay events. Although the game has an extensive orchestral soundtrack, the music is mostly heard during colossus encounters, beyond which the game's setting is underscored by more subtle sounds of water and wind. The open nature of Shadow of the Colossus' locations and their lack of life, coupled with the restrained use of music in the game, reinforces its atmosphere of solitude, analogous to that of Ico.

Team Ico wanted to bring "a unique sound and feel" to each of the player's confrontations with the colossi. At the time that NICO's technology demo was developed, Team Ico used available sample music. When the finalized material was delivered, the staff invited Otani to see the prototype as a means to communicate the game's direction to the composer. He then worked on the music for the game's discrete segments from the concepts submitted by the team via artwork and storyboards for the game's isolated scenes. Otani was repeatedly asked by Ueda to rewrite his compositions so that the team was able to use them in particular configurations that were compliant with the game's technical specifications. Otani felt that the assembled soundtrack was imbued with a cinematic quality. On December 7, 2005, an album containing music from the game was released only in Japan, titled Wanda and the Colossus Original Soundtrack: Roar of the Earth (ワンダと巨像 オリジナル サウンドトラック大地の咆哮, Wanda to Kyozō Original Soundtrack: Daichi no Hōkō). After the release of Shadow of the Colossus, Ueda stated his appreciation for Otani's work in the game. Ueda was especially fond of the music that accompanied the game's finale, a series of phrases that had been extracted by Otani from each of the score's other tracks and remixed into a new recording. Although parts of that composition perplexed Ueda at first, he became convinced that it "was a really cool way to use the game's music" after familiarizing himself with the result.

== Release ==
Following a July 15, 2005 news release where SCEI confirmed the publication date for the Japanese version of Shadow of the Colossus, the company divulged details about the limited first run edition of the game, which players could only acquire by pre-ordering, on August 19 of that year. On September 12, 2005, SCEI revealed that it had secured an arrangement to distribute the game through 7-Eleven's Japanese сhain of convenience stores. The companies launched a promotional campaign: consumers who pre-ordered the game at one of the 7-Eleven's retail outlets would receive stylized bookmarks whose designs incorporated artwork from Shadow of the Colossus. On October 7, 2005, several weeks before the game was demonstrated at the 2005 Akihabara Entertainment Festival in Tokyo, Dengeki PlayStation's online news service reported that custom copies of the game bundled with thematic memorabilia would be available for purchase at the event. Branded merchandise, such as calendars, posters and T-shirts, was also sold in the Akihabara district on the occasion, and a promotional image featuring a colossus was placed on a billboard in the area. "Giantology", a viral marketing campaign which purported to show real-world evidence for collosi, was released.

Unlike Ico, Shadow of the Colossus received far more exposure, in part because of Sony's willingness to leverage its resources for a massive advertising campaign. It was advertised in game magazines, on television and via online resources such as SCEI's affiliated websites: for instance, in November 2004 the game's soundtrack was partially made available for listening on the game's official webpage. Shadow of the Colossus was released in Japan on October 27, 2005 at a list price of 7,140 yen, which is a little over 60 USD for 2005 values. The limited edition of Shadow of the Colossus distributed through pre-ordering contained a different packaging from the standard edition, promotional videos that had been screened at the game's initial September 2004 unveiling, E3 2005 and the 2005 Tokyo Game Show, and production footage of NICO. The edition's content also consisted of unpublished screenhots, storyboards and video materials from various periods of the game's development.

Prior to its domestic launch, Shadow of the Colossus had been released in North America on October 18, 2005, accompanied by a nationwide advertising campaign that ran across multiple mediums. The PAL version of the game was released in February 2006. Much like the PAL release for Ico, the game came in cardboard packaging displaying various pieces of artwork from the game, and contained four art cards. The game also came with a "making of" documentary, a trailer for Ico and a gallery of concept art, accessible from the game's main menu. Sony Computer Entertainment also re-released Ico in PAL territories at the time of Shadow of the Colossus's release, both to promote the game through Ico's reputation, and to allow players who did not buy Ico during its original limited release to "complete their collections".

== Reception ==
Reception

Aggregate scores
Aggregator	Score
GameRankings	91%
Metacritic	91/100

Review scores
Publication	Score
1Up.com	A
Edge	8/10
Electronic Gaming Monthly	8.8/10
Eurogamer	10/10
Famitsu	37/40
Game Informer	8.75/10
GameSpot	8.7/10
GameTrailers	9.3/10
IGN	9.7/10
Official U.S. PlayStation Magazine	4.5/5

Shadow of the Colossus received universal acclaim, with an average critic score of 91% at GameRankings, making it the 11th-highest rated game of 2005. The game received strong reviews from publications such as the Japanese magazine Famitsu, who rated the game 37/40, the UK-based Edge, who awarded an 8/10, and Electronic Gaming Monthly, who granted 8.8/10. GameSpot's review gave it an 8.7, commenting that "the game's aesthetic presentation is unparalleled, by any standard", while multimedia website IGN hailed the game as "an amazing experience" and "an absolute must-have title", rating it 9.7/10. GameSpy described it as "possibly the most innovative and visually arresting game of the year for the PS2". A retrospective Edge article described the game as "a fiction of unquestionable thematic richness, of riveting emotional power, whose fundamental artistic qualities are completely fused with its interactivity." Dave Ciccoricco, a literature lecturer at the University of Otago, praised the game for its use of long cutscenes and stretches of riding to make the player engage in self-reflection and feel immersed in the game world.

Many reviewers consider the game's soundtrack to be one of its greatest aspects. In addition to Electronic Gaming Monthly's award of "Soundtrack of the Year", GameSpot commented that the musical score conveyed, and often intensified, the mood of any given situation, while it was described as "one of the finest game soundtracks ever" by a reviewer from Eurogamer.

However, the game has been criticised for its erratic frame rate, which is usually smooth while traversing the landscape, but often slows down in fast-paced situations, such as colossus battles. Concern was also expressed about the game's camera, which was described by GameSpy as being "as much of an opponent as the Colossi", "manag[ing] to re-center itself at the worst and most inopportune times". Reviewers are often mixed about Agro's AI and controls; Edge commented that the controls were "clumsy, crude, and unpredictable". Other critics like Game Revolution and GameSpot felt the game was too short (average playthrough time estimated 6 to 8 hours), with little replay value given the puzzle elements to each colossus battle.

=== Sales ===
Shadow of the Colossus sold 140,000 copies in its first week at retail in Japan, reaching number one in the charts. Almost 80% of the initial Japanese shipment was sold within two days. These figures compare favorably with Ico. The game was placed on Sony's list of Greatest Hits titles on August 6, 2006.

=== Awards ===
Shadow of the Colossus has received several awards, including recognition for "Best Character Design", "Best Game Design", "Best Visual Arts" and "Game of the Year", as well as one of three "Innovation Awards" at the 2006 Game Developers Choice Awards. At the 2006 DICE Summit, Shadow of the Colossus won the awards for "Outstanding Achievement in Art Direction" and "Outstanding Achievement in Visual Engineering" during the AIAS' 9th Annual Interactive Achievement Awards; it also received nominations for "Overall Game of the Year", "Console Game of the Year", "Action/Adventure Game of the Year", "Outstanding Achievement in Animation", and "Outstanding Innovation in Gaming". It received one of two "Special Rookie Awards" at the Famitsu Awards 2005. It was nominated for "Best Original Music", "Best Artistic Graphics" and "Best PS2 Game", yet also "Most Aggravating Frame Rate" in GameSpot's awards for 2005, while it won "Best Adventure Game" and "Best Artistic Design" in IGN's Best of 2005 awards, who cited Agro as the best sidekick in the history of video games. Two years after its release IGN listed Shadow as the fourth greatest PlayStation 2 game of all time. GamesRadar awarded it Best Game of the Year 2006 (being released in the UK in early 2006, later than the US), and appears in the site's "The 100 best games ever" list at number ten. The game's ending was selected as the fourth greatest moment in gaming by the editors of GamePro in July 2006. The readers of PlayStation Official Magazine voted it the 8th greatest PlayStation title ever released in the magazine's 50th issue, and it placed 43rd in a later poll presented in the journal's 100th issue. Destructoid named the game #1 in their list of the top 50 video games of the decade. IGN named Shadow of the Colossus the best game of 2005, and the second best game of the decade, behind Half-Life 2. In 2012, Complex magazine named Shadow of the Colossus the second-best PlayStation 2 game of all time, behind God of War II. In 2015, the game placed 4th on USgamer's The 15 Best Games Since 2000 list. In 2022, the game placed third on IGN's "Best PS2 Games Of All Time" list.

== Legacy ==
Shadow of the Colossus has been cited as an influence on various video games, including God of War II (2007), God of War III (2010), Titan Souls (2015), The Legend of Zelda: Breath of the Wild (2017), Death's Gambit (2018), Praey for the Gods (2019), and Elden Ring (2022). Film director Guillermo del Toro considers both Ico and Shadow of the Colossus as "masterpieces" and part of his directorial influence. Shadow of the Colossus is also cited numerous times in debates regarding the art quality and emotional perspectives of video games.

The game plays a significant role in the 2007 Mike Binder film Reign Over Me as one of the ways Adam Sandler's character copes with his primary struggle – with aspects of the game mirroring the tragedy that befell Sandler's character; Shadow of the Colossus falling giants mirroring the crashing towers of the September 11 attacks in which his wife and children died, and the game's lead character trying to resurrect his deceased love are two of the main themes which strike a similarity. Sandler is said to have ad libbed a detailed description of the control scheme in a scene with Don Cheadle, who plays his old friend. Both actors are said to have become experts at the game during the filming.

=== "Last Big Secret" ===
After the release of the game, a group of devoted fans known as the "Secret seekers" became convinced that the game was hiding a final secret, with many of them believing that secret to be a 17th colossus. While they ultimately did not discover a final secret over the course of their decade-long search, they would uncover numerous pieces of cut content in the game, such as a fully rendered dam outside of the game world. One of these fans, Nomad Colossus, would eventually be given special thanks in the credits of the game's remake.

=== Remastered version ===
A PlayStation 3 remastered version of Ico and Shadow of the Colossus was announced at Tokyo Game Show 2010 and released in September 2011 under the title The Ico & Shadow of the Colossus Collection. Developed by Bluepoint Games, both were improved graphically to take advantage of the PlayStation 3's hardware and HDTVs, with numerous other improvements implemented. The updated re-release of Shadow of the Colossus features high-definition (HD) graphics, content previously missing from the North American release, PlayStation Network Trophies, and 3D support. The HD version was released separately in Japan.

=== Remake ===
Sony announced a remake of Shadow of the Colossus for the PlayStation 4 during their Electronic Entertainment Expo 2017 press conference. It was released on February 6, 2018. The remake is led by Bluepoint, who developed the earlier PlayStation 3 remaster. The developers remade all the game's assets from the ground up, but the game retains the same gameplay from the original title along with the introduction of a new control scheme. Ueda had since left Sony, but provided a list of recommended changes to Bluepoint for the remake; he stated that he does not believe many of them will be implemented, nor would they add any of the colossi that had been cut from the original game.

=== Film adaptation ===
In April 2009, it was reported that Sony Pictures would adapt Shadow of the Colossus into a film. Kevin Misher, producer of The Scorpion King, The Interpreter and the recent attempted remake of Dune, negotiated to produce. It was announced that Fumito Ueda would be involved in the film's production. On May 23, 2012, it was reported that Chronicle director Josh Trank would be directing the film adaptation. Seth Lochhead was due to write the film. In September 2014, Variety reported that Mama director Andrés Muschietti would direct the film after Trank dropped out due to scheduling conflicts with other projects.

In January 2025, while chatting on Radio TU, Muschietti confirmed that the film was still in development, and that there was a script that he likes a lot. However, he acknowledged that there are difficulties securing his desired budget for the project.
