= The Ico & Shadow of the Colossus Collection =

2011 video game compilation

- European cover art
- Developers: Bluepoint Games; Japan Studio
- Publisher: Sony Computer Entertainment
- Platform: PlayStation 3
- Release: JP: September 22, 2011; NA: September 27, 2011; AU: September 29, 2011; EU: September 28, 2011
- Genre: Action-adventure
- Modes: Single-player, multiplayer

The Ico & Shadow of the Colossus Collection (known in PAL regions as Ico & Shadow of the Colossus Classics HD) is a 2011 video game compilation that contains high-definition remasters of two PlayStation 2 games, Ico (2001) and Shadow of the Colossus (2005), for the PlayStation 3. Developed by Bluepoint Games, who assisted in the remastering alongside Japan Studio and its division Team Ico, the bundle provides support for high-definition monitors, higher frame rates, stereoscopic 3D, and additional features for the PlayStation Network. The two games, while fundamentally different in gameplay and story, are thematically connected, with Shadow of the Colossus considered a spiritual sequel to Ico. Both games were critically acclaimed on their original release, while the remastered collection itself was praised by reviewers.

== Games ==
Within Ico, the player controls a boy named Ico, cursed by being born with horns on his head, and locked away in a remote empty castle by his village. Ico manages to free himself and comes across a young frail girl, Yorda, who is chased by shadowy creatures that try to drag her to a different realm. Ico helps Yorda escape, ultimately discovering that her mother is the Queen that resides in the castle and is trying to use Yorda to extend her own life.

Shadow of the Colossus is considered a spiritual sequel to Ico, and later stated by its creator, Fumito Ueda, to be a prequel set in the same world as Ico. The player controls a young man named Wander seeking to bring life back to the body of Mono, a woman that he cared for, by completing the task of killing sixteen monolithic beasts that wander the landscape. With his horse Agro, Wander locates each lair and destroys the beasts, slowly being overcome with dark energy, but fueled by the opportunity to reunite with Mono.

== Remastered features ==
The core game and story for both Ico (2001) and Shadow of the Colossus (2005) remain unchanged with the remastered versions. For the remastering, both games have had a graphical overhaul to allow them to support modern high-definition displays up to 1080p. With the more powerful PlayStation 3, both games feature a fixed frame rate of 30 frames per second; the original PlayStation 2 version of Shadow of the Colossus was noted for pushing the limits of the older console and often suffered from framerate losses. Both games support stereoscopic 3D, taking advantage of the original design of the games with considerations towards depth-of-field viewing, as evidenced by the large landscapes. Both games in the collection support 7.1 surround sound.

Ico's remastering is based on the European version, which features additional content that did not make it into the North America release of the original game, as well as some altered puzzles from these original releases. Specifically, upon completing the game, the player can restart to see the English translations of the mysterious language that Yorda, the player character's companion, uses, and a two-player mode with the second player in control of Yorda. Though there was consideration for inclusion of PlayStation Move motion control support, it was not released with it.

The collection includes bonus content, including two XMB Dynamic Themes and exclusive video content for Ico, Shadow of the Colossus, and Ueda's next game, The Last Guardian.

== Development ==
Prior to the announcement of the Collection, two other remastered collections of PlayStation 2 games had been made for the PlayStation 3: the God of War collection, and the Sly Cooper collection. There had been strong interest by Fumito Ueda, the project lead for both Ico and Shadow of the Colossus, to prepare such a collection for the Team Ico games. Initially, Ueda was not "too excited" about porting the games, given that they were designed specifically for the PlayStation 2 hardware. Ueda also noted that such a conversion may be difficult due to the complexities Team Ico had to create to push the technical limits of the PlayStation 2, but felt that it was still possible. As the PlayStation 3 became more popular, and PlayStation 2 consoles became rare, Ueda reconsidered his position on giving players of other consoles the opportunity to play these games. Ueda noted that such a release would depend on Sony's executives.

Work on the conversion for the collection was done by Bluepoint Games, who had previously performed the remastering for the God of War collection. The staff of Team Ico assisted in the process. Ueda considered Bluepoint Games "real craftsmen" in this porting effort, due to their understanding of the fundamentals of Ico and Shadow of the Colossus and passion for the games. Though it was Team Ico's idea originally to provide stereoscopic 3D, Ueda praised Bluepoint for their work in fine tuning the 3D effect, taking advantage of the scale and camera provided by the existing games; Ueda stated that the developers "made it into something beyond what I imagined". Team Ico considered adding new game content to both games. One example Ueda noted was adding in several colossi that were cut from the PlayStation 2 version of Shadow of the Colossus. Ultimately, Ueda and the team decided not to make any such content-oriented changes or additions, concerned that they might be considered "half-baked" by players, and instead opted to stay "faithful to the base work".

The collection was formally announced at the 2010 Tokyo Game Show. In the months prior, the collection's existence was hinted at by industry rumors and appearances of the collection in online vendor catalogs.

In North America and Europe/PAL regions, the two games were released as a single collection. This version features a reversible cover insert, with the original PlayStation 2 cover art for both games on the inner side of the case. Because of the criticism of Ico's original North American cover art, the North American version of the collection used the European/Japanese cover by Ueda. However, bilingual copies from Canada do not include the reversible artwork, they have a blank white interior.

In Japan, they were released as separate titles, though retailers sold a boxed collector's set containing both games and additional material.

== Reception ==
Reception

Aggregate score
Aggregator	Score
Metacritic	92/100

Review scores
Publication	Score
Eurogamer	9/10
Game Informer	9.75/10
IGN	8.5/10

The collection received strong positive praise from critics on release, based on the original titles as well as on the improvements made in the high definition port.

During the week of its release, the game was the top selling game across all platforms in both North American and Japan, based on sales data from Amazon.com.
