= List of downloadable PlayStation games (PAL region) =

Mz This is a list of PlayStation (PS1) games digitally re-released on the PlayStation Store in PAL territories. These are the original PlayStation versions of games software emulated. Initially, downloadable PS1 titles were only available to play on PlayStation Portable (PSP). An update released in April 2007 enabled playing of these purchased PS1 titles on PlayStation 3 (PS3). Some titles can also be played on other PlayStation systems. PlayStation Vita (PSV) and PlayStation TV (PSTV) support the same titles as each other. Those released on PlayStation 4 (PS4) and PlayStation 5 (PS5) display in high-definition and may feature the addition of trophies. The PS4 and PS5 releases are bundled together, and the former is also playable on PS5 through backwards compatibility. If a downloadable PS1 game has been purchased for a device released prior to the PS4, the title is automatically added to the user's library on all devices for which there is a release.

For some of the PS1 titles lacking official support for PSV and PSTV, this was previously able to be circumvented by transferring the game to the device via a PS3. The ability to transfer games to and from a PS3 was lost in a 2022 update. Playing PS1 titles on a PSP or PSV does not support local multiplayer that was designed to use multiple controllers, but PSTV supports this feature.

PSOne Classics released originally as PSP digital titles. Overtime however, firmware support for PS3 and PSVITA was added on April 19, 2007 and August 28, 2012 respectively.

The PlayStation Store for PSP, PS3, and PSVITA was shut down as of August 27, 2021. As such, a RED CELL indicates that the title is known to have been released as a PSOne Classics in PAL regions per PSVITA support, but exact date of PSP/PS3 release is unknown. A BOLD Title indicated this now reflects a EU/PAL release date, title and source. *This is a work-in-progess*

== Released titles ==
Title	Publisher	PSP	PS3	PSV	PS4	PS5	PEGI
Rally Cross	Sony Interactive Entertainment	January 11, 2007	May 3, 2007	August 28, 2012			3
Jet Rider	Sony Interactive Entertainment	February 4, 2007	April 19, 2007	August 28, 2012			3
Crash Bandicoot 2: Cortex Strikes Back	Sony Interactive Entertainment	July 26, 2007	July 26, 2007	August 28, 2012			3
CTR: Crash Team Racing	Sony Interactive Entertainment	October 18, 2007	October 18, 2007	August 28, 2012			3
Everybody's Golf 2	Sony Interactive Entertainment	October 18, 2007	October 18, 2007	August 28, 2012	January 17, 2023	January 17, 2023	3
Jumping Flash!	Sony Interactive Entertainment	November 8, 2007	November 8, 2007	August 28, 2012	June 13, 2022	June 13, 2022	3
Syphon Filter	Sony Interactive Entertainment	November 8, 2007	November 8, 2007	August 28, 2012	June 13, 2022	June 13, 2022	16
Cool Boarders	Sony Interactive Entertainment	November 8, 2007	November 8, 2007	August 28, 2012			3
Crash Bandicoot	Sony Interactive Entertainment	November 8, 2007	November 8, 2007	August 28, 2012			3
MediEvil	Sony Interactive Entertainment	November 8, 2007	November 8, 2007	August 28, 2012			16
Wipeout	Sony Interactive Entertainment	November 8, 2007	November 8, 2007	August 28, 2012			3
Destruction Derby	Sony Interactive Entertainment	November 29, 2007	November 29, 2007	August 28, 2012			3
Kula World	Sony Interactive Entertainment	November 29, 2007	November 29, 2007	August 28, 2012			3
Judge Dredd	Gremlin Interactive	Jan 24, 2008	Jan 24, 2008	August 28, 2012			7
Motorhead	Urbanscan Limited	January 31, 2008	January 31, 2008	August 28, 2012			3
Command & Conquer	Electronic Arts	March 13, 2008	March 13, 2008	Unsupported			16
Command & Conquer: Red Alert - Retaliation	Electronic Arts	March 27, 2008	March 27, 2008	Unsupported			16
Bishi Bashi Special	Konami	April 24, 2008	April 24, 2008	August 28, 2012			7
Syphon Filter 3	Sony Interactive Entertainment	June 12, 2008	June 12, 2008	August 28, 2012	January 17, 2023	January 17, 2023	18
Driver	Ubisoft	August 14, 2008	August 14, 2008	August 28, 2012			7
Command & Conquer: Red Alert	Electronic Arts	September 23, 2008	September 23, 2008	Unsupported			16
Crash Bandicoot 3: Warped	Sony Interactive Entertainment	October 23, 2008	October 23, 2008	August 28, 2012			3
Spin Jam	Empire Interactive	November 6, 2008	November 6, 2008	August 28, 2012			3
SimCity 2000	Electronic Arts	November 20, 2008	November 20, 2008	August 28, 2012			3
Syndicate Wars	Electronic Arts	November 27, 2008	November 27, 2008	August 28, 2012			16
Constructor	System 3	Unsupported	July 16, 2009	August 28, 2012			3
Party Time With Winnie the Pooh	Disney Interactive Studios	November 5, 2009	November 5, 2009	August 28, 2012			3
Metal Gear Solid	Konami	November 19, 2009	November 19, 2009	August 28, 2012			18
Final Fantasy VIII	Square Enix	February 4, 2010	February 4, 2010	August 28, 2012			16
Superstar Dance Club	XS Games	March 11, 2010	March 11, 2010	February 15, 2012			3
Disney's Atlantis: The Lost Empire	Disney Interactive Studios	April 22, 2010	April 22, 2010	August 28, 2012			3
Kurushi Final: Mental Blocks	G-Artists	June 16, 2010	June 16, 2010	August 28, 2012			3
Front Mission 3	Square Enix	September 1, 2010	September 1, 2010	August 28, 2012			16
Grandia	Sony Interactive Entertainment	November 10, 2010	November 10, 2010	August 28, 2012			3
Critical Depth	Atari	November 17, 2010	November 17, 2010	August 28, 2012			7
Sports Superbike 2	Midas Interactive	November 17, 2010	November 17, 2010	February 22, 2012			3
40 Winks: Conquer Your Dreams	Sony Interactive Entertainment	November 24, 2010	November 24, 2010	August 28, 2012			3
ATV Racers	Midas Interactive	November 24, 2010	November 24, 2010	August 28, 2012			3
Miracle Space Race	Midas Interactive	November 24, 2010	November 24, 2010	August 28, 2012			3
Super Slammin' Dodgeball	Midas Interactive	November 24, 2010	November 24, 2010	August 28, 2012			3
Streak: Hover Board Racing	Atari	December 8, 2010	December 8, 2010	August 28, 2012			3
A Bug's Life / Monsters, Inc.: Scare Island	Disney Interactive Studios	December 22, 2010	December 22, 2010	August 28, 2012			3
Disney's Atlantis: The Lost Empire / Disney's Hercules Bundle	Disney Interactive Studios	December 22, 2010	December 22, 2010	August 28, 2012			3
Tomb Raider: Chronicles	Sony Interactive Entertainment	January 12, 2011	January 12, 2011	August 28, 2012			16
Crash Bandicoot 2: Cortex Strikes Back (EU Patched Re-release)	Sony Interactive Entertainment	February 2, 2011	February 2, 2011	August 28, 2012			3
BugRiders: The Race of Kings	Atari	February 9, 2011	February 9, 2011	August 28, 2012			7
Disney's Action Game Featuring Hercules	Disney Interactive Studios	March 8, 2011	March 8, 2011	August 28, 2012			3
James Pond 2: Codename RoboCod	System 3	March 8, 2011	March 8, 2011	August 28, 2012			3
Street Fighter Alpha 2	Capcom	March 16, 2011	March 16, 2011	August 28, 2012			16
Resident Evil: Director's Cut	Capcom	March 23, 2011	March 23, 2011	August 28, 2012	June 13, 2022	June 13, 2022	18
Rageball	Midas Interactive	June 1, 2011	June 1, 2011	August 28, 2012			12
Rascal Racers	Midas Interactive	June 1, 2011	June 1, 2011	August 28, 2012			3
Sorcerer's Maze / Prism Land	Console Classics			August 28, 2012			3
Arc the Lad III	Sony Interactive Entertainment	June 13, 2012	June 13, 2012	August 28, 2012			16
Tekken	Bandai Namco Entertainment	June 15, 2011	June 15, 2011	August 28, 2012			16
Pocket Fighter	Capcom	Unsupported					16
Gubble	Midas Interactive	September 28, 2011	September 28, 2011	August 28, 2012			3
Snowboard Racer	Midas Interactive	September 28, 2011	September 28, 2011	August 28, 2012			3
Gex 3D: Return of the Gecko	Square Enix	October 5, 2011	October 5, 2011	August 28, 2012			12
Arcade Hits: Magical Drop	MonkeyPaw Games	November 2, 2011	November 2, 2011	August 28, 2012			3
Fear Effect	Square Enix	Unsupported	December 14, 2011	August 28, 2012			16
Mickey's Wild Adventure	Disney Interactive Studios	December 14, 2011	December 14, 2011	August 28, 2012			3
Gex	Sony Interactive Entertainment	December 21, 2011	December 21, 2011	August 28, 2012			3
Pandemonium 2	Square Enix	January 18, 2012	January 18, 2012	August 28, 2012			3
Fear Effect 2: Retro Helix	Square Enix	Unsupported	February 8, 2012	August 28, 2012			16
Resident Evil 2	Capcom	February 29, 2012	February 29, 2012	August 28, 2012			18
Resident Evil 3: Nemesis	Capcom	February 29, 2012	February 29, 2012	August 28, 2012			18
Hi-Octane	Electronic Arts	March 12, 2009	March 12, 2009	August 28, 2012			3
Populous: The Beginning	Electronic Arts	December 11, 2007	December 11, 2007	August 28, 2012			16
Theme Park	Electronic Arts	November 6, 2008	November 6, 2008	August 28, 2012			3
The Emperor's New Groove	Disney Interactive Studios	July 27, 2010	July 27, 2010	August 28, 2012			3
Theme Hospital	Electronic Arts	January 31, 2008	January 31, 2008	August 28, 2012			3
Arcade Hits: Outlaws of the Lost Dynasty	MonkeyPaw Games	May 16, 2012	May 16, 2012	August 28, 2012			16
Urban Chaos	Square Enix	August 22, 2012	August 22, 2012	August 28, 2012			16
Motor Toon Grand Prix 2	Sony Interactive Entertainment	Unsupported		August 28, 2012			3
Delta Force: Urban Warfare	NovaLogic	Unsupported		August 28, 2012			16
Oddworld: Abe's Oddysee	Oddworld Inhabitants			August 28, 2012	June 13, 2022	June 13, 2022	16
Tekken 2	Bandai Namco Entertainment			August 28, 2012	June 13, 2022	June 13, 2022	16
Toy Story 2: Buzz Lightyear to the Rescue	Disney Interactive Studios			August 28, 2012	June 13, 2022	June 13, 2022	3
Twisted Metal	Sony Interactive Entertainment			August 28, 2012	July 18, 2023	July 18, 2023	16
Oddworld: Abe's Exoddus	Oddworld Inhabitants			August 28, 2012	December 20, 2022	December 20, 2022	16
A Bug's Life	Disney Interactive Studios			August 28, 2012			3
The Adventures of Alundra	MonkeyPaw Games			August 28, 2012			16
All-Star Boxing	Sony Interactive Entertainment			August 28, 2012			7
All-Star Slammin' D-Ball	Midas Interactive			August 28, 2012			3
Arc the Lad	MonkeyPaw Games			August 28, 2012			3
Arc the Lad II	Sony Interactive Entertainment			August 28, 2012			16
Arc Arena: Monster Tournament	Sony Interactive Entertainment			August 28, 2012			16
Arcade Hits: Shienryu	MonkeyPaw Games			August 28, 2012			3
Arcade Hits: Sonic Wings Special	MonkeyPaw Games			August 28, 2012			3
Atari Anniversary Edition Redux	Atari			August 28, 2012			7
Blockids	MonkeyPaw Games			August 28, 2012			3
Blood Omen: Legacy of Kain	Square Enix			August 28, 2012			18
Buzz Lightyear of Star Command	Disney Interactive Studios			August 28, 2012			3
Castlevania Chronicles	Konami			August 28, 2012			16
Centipede	Atari			August 28, 2012			3
Chō Aniki: Kyūkyoku Muteki Ginga Saikyō Otoko	MonkeyPaw Games			August 28, 2012			16
Cool Boarders 2	Sony Interactive Entertainment			August 28, 2012			3
Dezaemon Plus!	MonkeyPaw Games			August 28, 2012			7
Disney's Action Game Featuring Hercules	Disney Interactive Studios			August 28, 2012			3
Disney's Tarzan	Sony Interactive Entertainment			August 28, 2012			3
Eagle One: Harrier Attack	Atari			August 28, 2012			12
Fighting Force	Square Enix			August 28, 2012			16
Fighting Force 2	Square Enix			August 28, 2012			16
Final Fantasy V	Square Enix			August 28, 2012			16
Final Fantasy VI	Square Enix			August 28, 2012			16
Final Fantasy VII	Square Enix			August 28, 2012			16
Final Fantasy IX	Square Enix			August 28, 2012			16
G-Police	Sony Interactive Entertainment			August 28, 2012			3
Gaia Seed: Project Seed Trap	MonkeyPaw Games			August 28, 2012			3
Galaxy Fight: Universal Warriors	MonkeyPaw Games			August 28, 2012			7
Gex 3: Deep Cover Gecko	Square Enix			August 28, 2012			16
Guilty Gear	System 3			August 28, 2012			16
Gunship	Atari			August 28, 2012			12
Hardcore 4X4	Sony Interactive Entertainment			August 28, 2012			3
International Track & Field	Konami			August 28, 2012			3
Jet Rider 2	Sony Interactive Entertainment			August 28, 2012			3
Jigsaw Madness	Sony Interactive Entertainment			August 28, 2012			3
Legacy of Kain: Soul Reaver	Square Enix			August 28, 2012			18
Lilo & Stitch	Disney Interactive Studios			August 28, 2012			3
Missile Command	Atari			August 28, 2012			3
The Little Mermaid II	Disney Interactive Studios			August 28, 2012			3
The Little Mermaid II / Party Time with Winnie the Pooh	Disney Interactive Studios			August 28, 2012			3
Monsters, Inc. Scare Island	Disney Interactive Studios			August 28, 2012			3
N2O: Nitrous Oxide	Sony Interactive Entertainment			August 28, 2012			16
Namco Museum Volume 1	Bandai Namco Entertainment			August 28, 2012			3
Namco Museum Volume 2	Bandai Namco Entertainment			August 28, 2012			3
Namco Museum Volume 3	Bandai Namco Entertainment			August 28, 2012			3
Namco Museum Volume 4	Bandai Namco Entertainment			August 28, 2012			3
Namco Museum Volume 5	Bandai Namco Entertainment			August 28, 2012			3
Pandemonium!	Square Enix			August 28, 2012			3
Parasite Eve II	Square Enix			August 28, 2012			18
Peter Pan: Adventures in Never Land	Disney Interactive Studios			August 28, 2012			3
Pong	Atari			August 28, 2012			3
R4: Ridge Racer Type 4	Bandai Namco Entertainment			August 28, 2012			3
Rayman	Ubisoft			August 28, 2012			3
Rayman 2: The Great Escape	Ubisoft			August 28, 2012			3
Reel Fishing	Sony Interactive Entertainment			August 28, 2012			3
Sheep	Empire Interactive			August 28, 2012			3
Silent Hill	Konami			August 28, 2012			18
Tom Clancy's Rainbow Six	Ubisoft			August 28, 2012			16
Tomb Raider II	Square Enix			August 28, 2012			16
Tomb Raider III	Square Enix			August 28, 2012			16
Tomb Raider: The Last Revelation	Square Enix			August 28, 2012			16
Toy Story Racer	Disney Interactive Studios			August 28, 2012			3
Toy Story Racer / Toy Story 2: Woody and Buzz bundle	Disney Interactive Studios			August 28, 2012			3
Vagrant Story	Square Enix			August 28, 2012			16
Wild Arms	Sony Interactive Entertainment			August 28, 2012			3
XS Airboat Racing	Sony Interactive Entertainment			August 28, 2012			3
XS Junior League Dodgeball	Sony Interactive Entertainment			August 28, 2012			3
XS Junior League Soccer	XS Games			August 28, 2012			3
Klonoa: Door to Phantomile	Bandai Namco Entertainment	September 19, 2012	September 19, 2012	September 19, 2012			3
Tall Unlimited	MonkeyPaw Games	September 19, 2012	September 19, 2012	September 19, 2012			3
Tomba!	Sony Interactive Entertainment	October 3, 2012	October 3, 2012	October 3, 2012			3
Warhawk	Sony Interactive Entertainment	October 17, 2012	October 17, 2012	October 17, 2012			3
Castlevania: Symphony of the Night	Konami	December 12, 2012	December 12, 2012	December 12, 2012			16
Spyro the Dragon	Sony Interactive Entertainment	December 12, 2012	December 12, 2012	December 12, 2012			3
UmJammer Lammy	Sony Interactive Entertainment	December 12, 2012	December 12, 2012	December 12, 2012			3
Ape Escape	Sony Interactive Entertainment				June 13, 2022	June 13, 2022	3
Everybody's Golf	Sony Interactive Entertainment				June 13, 2022	June 13, 2022	3
Tekken 3	Bandai Namco Entertainment				October, 21 2025	October, 21 2025	
Twisted Metal: World Tour	Sony Interactive Entertainment				July 18, 2023	July 18, 2023	16
Worms Armageddon	Team 17				June 13, 2022	June 13, 2022	
Worms World Party	Team 17				June 13, 2022	June 13, 2022	
Unconfirmed EU Releases		NA Dates					
2Xtreme	Sony Interactive Entertainment						3
Sports Superbike (?)							
Street Sk8er							
Street Sk8er 2							
Jet Rider 3	Sony Interactive Entertainment	February 21, 2008	February 21, 2008				3
R-Types	Irem	April 24, 2008	April 24, 2008	Unsupported			3
Syphon Filter 2	Sony Interactive Entertainment	November 8, 2007	November 8, 2007				18
Street Fighter Alpha	Capcom						16
Sno-Cross Championship Racing	Crave Entertainment	October 16, 2008	October 16, 2008	Unsupported			3
Suikoden	Konami	December 23, 2008	December 23, 2008				3
Bowling	Agetec	May 7, 2009	May 7, 2009				3
R-Type Delta	Irem	May 7, 2009	May 7, 2009				3
Spyro 2: Ripto's Rage!	Sony Interactive Entertainment	May 7, 2009	May 7, 2009				3
Spyro: Year of the Dragon	Sony Interactive Entertainment	May 14, 2009	May 14, 2009				3
The King of Fighters '99	SNK Playmore	May 14, 2009	May 14, 2009				16
Ford Racing	Empire Interactive	May 21, 2009	May 21, 2009	Unsupported			3
Medal of Honor	Electronic Arts	June 2, 2009	June 2, 2009				16
Medal of Honor: Underground	Electronic Arts	June 11, 2009	June 11, 2009				16
Mobile Light Force	Console Classics	June 25, 2009	June 25, 2009				3
Spec Ops: Stealth Patrol	Take-Two Interactive		July 9, 2009				16
Spec Ops: Ranger Elite	Take-Two Interactive		July 16, 2009				16
Spec Ops: Covert Assault	Take-Two Interactive		July 23, 2009				16
Spec Ops: Airborne Commando	Take-Two Interactive		July 30, 2009				16
Dead in the Water	Console Classics		August 13, 2009				3
Ten Pin Alley	Console Classics		August 13, 2009				3
Tomb Raider	Square Enix	August 13, 2009	August 28, 2012	August 28, 2012			16
Bloody Roar	Konami		August 20, 2009	Unsupported			16
Cool Boarders 3	Sony Interactive Entertainment		September 3, 2009				3
Jumping Flash! 2	Sony Interactive Entertainment						3
Nuclear Strike	Electronic Arts						16
Backstreet Billiards	Agetec	November 25, 2009	November 25, 2009				3
Bomberman Party Edition	Konami		December 10, 2009	Unsupported			3
Wing Commander IV: The Price of Freedom	Electronic Arts		December 22, 2009				16
Championship Bass	Electronic Arts		January 21, 2010				3
Extreme Pinball	Electronic Arts		January 28, 2010				3
Dirt Jockey: Heavy Equipment Operator	Mastiff		February 11, 2010				3
Magic Carpet	Electronic Arts		February 18, 2010				3
Mass Destruction	Console Classics		February 18, 2010				16
One	Console Classics		March 18, 2010				16
Perfect Weapon	Console Classics		March 25, 2010				16
XS Moto	Console Classics		April 22, 2010				3
Star Wars: Dark Forces	LucasArts v	April 29, 2010	Unsupported			16	
Bomberman Fantasy Race	Konami		May 18, 2010	Unsupported			3
Bloody Roar 2	Konami		June 8, 2010	Unsupported			16
Soviet Strike	Electronic Arts		September 14, 2010				16
Magical Drop F - Daibouken Mo Rakujyanai!	MonkeyPaw Games		October 5, 2010				7
Money Idol Exchanger	MonkeyPaw Games	November 16, 2010	November 16, 2010				3
Re-Loaded	Interplay Entertainment		January 4, 2011				18
Metal Slug X	SNK Playmore		January 18, 2011				16
Rockman	Capcom		January 18, 2011				3
Rockman 2: Dr. Wily no Nazo	Capcom		February 1, 2011				3
Harvest Moon: Back to Nature	Natsume Inc.		February 8, 2011				3
Reel Fishing II	Natsume Inc.		February 8, 2011				3
Destrega	Koei Tecmo		February 15, 2011				16
Romance of the Three Kingdoms IV: Wall of Fire	Koei Tecmo		February 15, 2011				3
Saiyuki: Journey West	Koei Tecmo		February 15, 2011				3
Rockman 3: Dr. Wily no Saigo!?	Capcom		March 8, 2011				3
The Rapid Angel	MonkeyPaw Games		July 5, 2011				3
Yakiniku Bugyō	MonkeyPaw Games		July 5, 2011				3
Kyuin	MonkeyPaw Games		July 19, 2011				3
Breath of Fire IV	Capcom		August 16, 2011				16
Rockman 4: Aratanaru Yabō!!	Capcom		September 6, 2011				3
Cyberbots: Full Metal Madness	Capcom		September 13, 2011				3
XS Junior League Football	Console Classics		October 11, 2011				3
Street Fighter Alpha 3	Capcom	October 18, 2011	October 18, 2011				16
Monster Bass!	Console Classics	October 25, 2011	October 25, 2011				3
Dezaemon Kids!	MonkeyPaw Games		November 2, 2011				3
Vanguard Bandits	MonkeyPaw Games		November 15, 2011				16
Darkstalkers: The Night Warriors	Capcom		November 29, 2011				16
Darkstalkers 3	Capcom		April 24, 2012				16
Future Cop: LAPD	Electronic Arts		April 24, 2012				16
Myst	Cyan Worlds	Unsupported	May 15, 2012				3
Alone in the Dark: The New Nightmare	Atari		May 22, 2012	Unsupported			18
Turnabout	Natsume Inc.		September 25, 2012				3
Sentimental Graffiti	GungHo Online Entertainment						
Art Camion Sugorokuden	GungHo Online Entertainment	Unsupported	December 4, 2012				
Finger Flashing	GungHo Online Entertainment		December 4, 2012				
Lup*Salad	GungHo Online Entertainment		December 4, 2012				
Makeruna! Makendō 2	GungHo Online Entertainment		December 4, 2012				
Vehicle Cavalier	GungHo Online Entertainment		December 4, 2012				
Zanac X Zanac	GungHo Online Entertainment		December 4, 2012				
Favorite Dear: Enkan no Monogatari	GungHo Online Entertainment						
First Queen IV	GungHo Online Entertainment						
Mahjong Uranai Fortuna: Tsuki no Megami-tachi	GungHo Online Entertainment						
Rung Rung: Oz no Mahou Tsukai - Another World	GungHo Online Entertainment						
Trump Shiyouyo! Fukkoku-ban (Card Shark)	GungHo Online Entertainment						
Evergreen Avenue	GungHo Online Entertainment	April 9, 2013	April 9, 2013				
Favorite Dear: Junshiro no Yogenmono	GungHo Online Entertainment		April 9, 2013				
Mahjong Youchien: Tamago Gumi	GungHo Online Entertainment		April 9, 2013				
Mahjong Youchien: Tamago Gumi 2	GungHo Online Entertainment		May 7, 2013				
Motto Trump Shiyouyo! i-Mode de Grand Prix	GungHo Online Entertainment	May 7, 2013	May 7, 2013				
Zero Kara no Shogi: Shogi Youchien Ayumi Kumi R	GungHo Online Entertainment		May 7, 2013				
Metal Gear Solid: VR Missions	Konami	November 26, 2013	November 26, 2013	November 26, 2013			18
Double Dragon	MonkeyPaw Games		January 14, 2014				
Lucifer Ring	MonkeyPaw Games		January 21, 2014				
Cyber Sled	Bandai Namco Entertainment		January 28, 2014				3
The Firemen 2: Pete & Danny	MonkeyPaw Games		January 28, 2014				
Pac-Man World 20th Anniversary	Bandai Namco Entertainment	February 11, 2014	February 11, 2014	February 11, 2014			3
Wolf Fang	MonkeyPaw Games		February 11, 2014				
Mr. Driller	Bandai Namco Entertainment		February 18, 2014				3
Tomba! 2: The Evil Swine Return	MonkeyPaw Games		February 18, 2014				3
Herc's Adventures	LucasArts	February 25, 2014	February 25, 2014				3
TNN Motorsports Hardcore TR	Console Classics	March 25, 2014	March 25, 2014				3
Hyper Crazy Climber	MonkeyPaw Games		April 15, 2014				
Bust-a-Move 4	Square Enix	April 29, 2014	April 29, 2014				3
Dragon Beat: Legend of Pinball	GungHo Online Entertainment		May 20, 2014				
Dungeon Shoutenkai: Densetsu no Ken Hajimemashita	GungHo Online Entertainment		May 20, 2014				
Heroine Dream 2	GungHo Online Entertainment	May 20, 2014	May 20, 2014				
Neo Planet	GungHo Online Entertainment		May 20, 2014				
Tokyo 23-ku Seifuku Wars	GungHo Online Entertainment		May 20, 2014				
Heroine Dream	GungHo Online Entertainment		June 3, 2014				
Card Games	Agetec	August 26, 2014	August 26, 2014				3
Putter Golf	Agetec	August 26, 2014	August 26, 2014				3
Strider 2	Capcom	October 7, 2014	October 7, 2014				3
Vib-Ribbon	Sony Interactive Entertainment	October 7, 2014	October 7, 2014				3
Kickboxing	Agetec	November 18, 2014	November 18, 2014				16
Boxing	Agetec	November 25, 2014	November 25, 2014				16
Chess	Agetec	December 2, 2014	December 2, 2014				3
Suikoden II	Konami	December 9, 2014	December 9, 2014	December 9, 2014			16
Xevious 3D/G+	Bandai Namco Entertainment	February 24, 2015	February 24, 2015				3
Aces of the Air	Agetec		March 3, 2015				3
Battle Hunter	Agetec	March 10, 2015	March 10, 2015				3
Echo Night	From Software	March 17, 2015	March 17, 2015				16
Armored Core	From Software	March 24, 2015	March 24, 2015				16
Shadow Tower	From Software	March 31, 2015	March 31, 2015	March 31, 2015			16
Crossroad Crisis	Agetec	September 15, 2015	September 15, 2015				3
Shooter: Space Shot	Agetec	September 15, 2015	September 15, 2015				3
Puzzle Star Sweep	Agetec	September 22, 2015	September 22, 2015				3
Racing	Agetec	September 22, 2015	September 22, 2015	September 22, 2015			3
Shooter: Starfighter Sanvein	Agetec	October 6, 2015	October 6, 2015				3
Street Racquetball	Agetec	October 6, 2015	October 6, 2015				3
Tecmo's Deception: Invitation to Darkness	Koei Tecmo	October 27, 2015	October 27, 2015				16

== See also ==
- Lists of Virtual Console games
- High-definition remasters for PlayStation consoles
- List of PS one Classics (Japan)
- List of PS one Classics (North America)
