= List of downloadable PlayStation games (North America) =

This is a list of PlayStation (PS1) games digitally re-released in unaltered form on the PlayStation Store in NA territories. These games run via emulation of the PS1 hardware. At their initial release in December 2006, downloadable PS1 titles were only available to play on PlayStation Portable (PSP), but titles became available for PlayStation 3 (PS3) in April 2007, for PlayStation Vita on August 28, 2012, and PlayStation 4 (PS4) and PlayStation 5 (PS5) on June 13, 2022.

The PlayStation TV (PSTV) supports the same titles as the Vita. Each title released for PS4 is bundled with its PS5 release, and the former is also playable on PS5 through backwards compatibility. In most cases, when a PS1 title was digitally purchased for hardware predating the PS4, it may be added without charge to the user's PS4 and PS5 libraries, provided it is available on those platforms. For some of the PS1 titles lacking official support for Vita and PSTV, this was previously able to be circumvented by transferring the game to the device via a PS3. The ability to transfer games to and from a PS3 was lost in a 2022 update.

Playing PS1 titles on a PSP or Vita does not support local multiplayer that was designed to use multiple controllers, but PSTV supports this feature. Those released on PS4 and PS5 display in high-definition and may feature the addition of trophies.

== Released titles ==
Key
CB	Supports cross-buy (game can be claimed for PS4 and PS5 at no additional cost if purchased for PSP, PS3, or PSV)
NCB	Does not support the above form of cross-buy
T	PS4 and PS5 Trophy support
NT	No Trophy support

A red cell indicates that the title is no longer available for purchase on the PlayStation Store.

There are 288 games on this list.

Title	Publisher	PSP	PS3	Vita	PS4	PS5	Notes
Ape Escape	Sony Interactive Entertainment				June 13, 2022	June 13, 2022	T
Cool Boarders	Sony Interactive Entertainment	December 4, 2006	April 19, 2007	August 28, 2012	March 19, 2024	March 19, 2024	CBT
Crash Bandicoot	Sony Interactive Entertainment	December 21, 2006	May 3, 2007	Unsupported			
Hot Shots Golf	Sony Interactive Entertainment				June 13, 2022	June 13, 2022	T
Hot Shots Golf 2	Sony Interactive Entertainment	December 4, 2006	April 19, 2007	August 28, 2012	January 17, 2023	January 17, 2023	T
I.Q.: Intelligent Qube	Sony Interactive Entertainment				June 13, 2022	June 13, 2022	T
Kurushi Final: Mental Blocks	Sony Interactive Entertainment				October 17, 2023	October 17, 2023	T
Syphon Filter	Sony Interactive Entertainment	December 4, 2006	April 19, 2007	August 28, 2012	June 13, 2022	June 13, 2022	CBT
Tekken 2	Bandai Namco Entertainment	December 4, 2006	April 19, 2007		June 13, 2022	June 13, 2022	CB
Jumping Flash!	Sony Interactive Entertainment	January 4, 2007	April 19, 2007		June 13, 2022	June 13, 2022	
Rally Cross	Sony Interactive Entertainment	January 11, 2007	April 19, 2007		January 16, 2024	January 16, 2024	T
Jet Moto	Sony Interactive Entertainment	February 4, 2007	April 19, 2007	August 28, 2012	November 21, 2023	November 21, 2023	T
2Xtreme	Sony Interactive Entertainment	February 8, 2007	April 19, 2007		May 21, 2024	May 21, 2024	T
Destruction Derby	Sony Interactive Entertainment	February 15, 2007	April 19, 2007	August 28, 2012			
Wipeout	Sony Interactive Entertainment	March 8, 2007	April 19, 2007				
MediEvil	Sony Interactive Entertainment	May 3, 2007	May 3, 2007	August 28, 2012	May 9, 2024	May 9, 2024	T
Castlevania: Symphony of the Night	Konami	July 19, 2007	July 19, 2007				
Spyro the Dragon	Sony Interactive Entertainment	October 25, 2007	October 25, 2007	Unsupported			
Twisted Metal 2	Sony Interactive Entertainment	November 1, 2007	November 1, 2007	August 28, 2012	July 18, 2023	July 18, 2023	NCBT
Wild Arms	Sony Interactive Entertainment	December 6, 2007	December 6, 2007	August 28, 2012	June 13, 2022	June 13, 2022	CBT
Warhawk	Sony Interactive Entertainment	December 20, 2007	December 20, 2007				
Crash Bandicoot 2: Cortex Strikes Back	Sony Interactive Entertainment	January 10, 2008	January 10, 2008	Unsupported			
Jet Moto 2	Sony Interactive Entertainment	January 24, 2008	January 24, 2008	August 28, 2012	February 20, 2024	February 20, 2024	T
G-Police	Sony Interactive Entertainment				May 21, 2024	May 21, 2024	T
Crash Bandicoot: Warped	Sony Interactive Entertainment	February 7, 2008	February 7, 2008	Unsupported			
Jet Moto 3	Sony Interactive Entertainment	February 21, 2008	February 21, 2008				
R-Types (unavailable since 2012)	Irem	April 24, 2008	April 24, 2008	Unsupported			
Syphon Filter 3	Sony Interactive Entertainment	June 12, 2008	June 12, 2008		January 17, 2023	January 17, 2023	CBT
Rayman	Ubisoft	July 17, 2008	July 17, 2008				
Street Fighter Alpha	Capcom	August 14, 2008	August 14, 2008				
Sno-Cross Championship Racing	Crave Entertainment	October 16, 2008	October 16, 2008	Unsupported			
Castlevania Chronicles	Konami	December 18, 2008	December 18, 2008				
Rayman 2: The Great Escape	Ubisoft	December 18, 2008	December 18, 2008				
Suikoden	Konami	December 23, 2008	December 23, 2008				
Bowling	Agetec	May 7, 2009	May 7, 2009				
R-Type Delta (unavailable since 2012)	Irem	May 7, 2009	May 7, 2009				
Spyro 2: Ripto's Rage!	Sony Interactive Entertainment	May 7, 2009	May 7, 2009	Unsupported			
Spyro: Year of the Dragon	Sony Interactive Entertainment	May 14, 2009	May 14, 2009	Unsupported			
The King of Fighters '99	SNK Playmore	May 14, 2009	May 14, 2009				
Ford Racing	Empire Interactive	May 21, 2009	May 21, 2009	Unsupported			
Tom Clancy's Rainbow Six	Ubisoft	May 21, 2009	May 21, 2009				
Resident Evil: Director's Cut	Capcom	May 28, 2009	May 28, 2009		June 13, 2022	June 13, 2022	CB
Final Fantasy VII	Square Enix	June 2, 2009	June 2, 2009	August 28, 2012			
Medal of Honor	Electronic Arts	June 2, 2009	June 2, 2009				
Street Fighter Alpha 2	Capcom	June 4, 2009	June 4, 2009				
Medal of Honor: Underground	Electronic Arts	June 11, 2009	June 11, 2009				
Metal Gear Solid	Konami	June 18, 2009	June 18, 2009	Transfer			
Mobile Light Force	Console Classics	June 25, 2009	June 25, 2009				
Spec Ops: Stealth Patrol	Take-Two Interactive		July 9, 2009				
XS Junior League Soccer	Console Classics		July 9, 2009				
Spec Ops: Ranger Elite	Take-Two Interactive		July 16, 2009				
Spec Ops: Covert Assault	Take-Two Interactive		July 23, 2009				
Wild Arms 2	Sony Interactive Entertainment		July 23, 2009		February 21, 2023	February 21, 2023	CBT
Spec Ops: Airborne Commando	Take-Two Interactive		July 30, 2009				
Dead in the Water	Console Classics		August 13, 2009				
Ten Pin Alley	Console Classics		August 13, 2009				
Tomb Raider	Square Enix	August 13, 2009	August 28, 2012	August 28, 2012			
Bloody Roar	Konami		August 20, 2009	Unsupported			
Cool Boarders 2	Sony Interactive Entertainment	August 27, 2009	August 28, 2012	August 28, 2012			
SimCity 2000	Electronic Arts		August 27, 2009				
Tomb Raider II	Square Enix		August 27, 2009				
Cool Boarders 3	Sony Interactive Entertainment		September 3, 2009				
Blood Omen: Legacy of Kain	Square Enix	September 10, 2009	September 10, 2009	Transfer	November 19, 2024	November 19, 2024	T
Silent Hill	Konami		September 10, 2009	Transfer			
Syphon Filter 2	Sony Interactive Entertainment	September 10, 2009	September 10, 2009		September 20, 2022	September 20, 2022	CBT
Final Fantasy Tactics	Square Enix	September 17, 2009	September 17, 2009				
Tomb Raider III	Square Enix	September 17, 2009	September 17, 2009				
Gex 3: Deep Cover Gecko	Square Enix	October 1, 2009	October 1, 2009				
Jumping Flash! 2	Sony Interactive Entertainment	October 1, 2009	October 1, 2009				T
Nuclear Strike	Electronic Arts	October 1, 2009	October 1, 2009				
UmJammer Lammy	Sony Interactive Entertainment	October 1, 2009	October 1, 2009				
Pandemonium	Square Enix	October 8, 2009	October 8, 2009				
Tomb Raider: The Last Revelation	Square Enix	October 15, 2009	October 15, 2009				
Oddworld: Abe's Exoddus	Oddworld Inhabitants	October 22, 2009	October 22, 2009	Unsupported	December 20, 2022	December 20, 2022	CBT
Oddworld: Abe's Oddysee	Oddworld Inhabitants	October 22, 2009	October 22, 2009	Unsupported	June 13, 2022	June 13, 2022	CBT
Gex	Square Enix	November 5, 2009	November 5, 2009				
Command & Conquer: Red Alert	Electronic Arts	November 12, 2009	November 12, 2009	Transfer			
Legacy of Kain: Soul Reaver	Square Enix	November 19, 2009	November 19, 2009	Transfer			
Resident Evil 2	Capcom	November 19, 2009	November 19, 2009		August 19, 2025	August 19, 2025	
Backstreet Billiards	Agetec	November 25, 2009	November 25, 2009				
Command & Conquer	Electronic Arts		November 25, 2009	Unsupported			
Dino Crisis	Capcom		November 25, 2009		October 15, 2024	October 15, 2024	CB
Fighting Force	Square Enix		November 25, 2009				
International Track & Field	Konami		November 25, 2009	Transfer			
Reel Fishing	Natsume Inc.		November 25, 2009				
Command & Conquer: Red Alert - Retaliation	Electronic Arts		December 3, 2009	Transfer			
Resident Evil 3: Nemesis	Capcom		December 3, 2009		August 19, 2025	August 19, 2025	
Bomberman Party Edition	Konami		December 10, 2009	Unsupported			
Final Fantasy VIII	Square Enix		December 17, 2009				
Wing Commander IV: The Price of Freedom	Electronic Arts		December 22, 2009				
Championship Bass	Electronic Arts		January 21, 2010				
Extreme Pinball	Electronic Arts		January 28, 2010				
Hi-Octane	Electronic Arts		January 28, 2010				
Dirt Jockey: Heavy Equipment Operator	Mastiff		February 11, 2010				
Populous: The Beginning	Electronic Arts		February 11, 2010				
Sim Theme Park	Electronic Arts		February 11, 2010	Unsupported			
Magic Carpet	Electronic Arts		February 18, 2010				
Mass Destruction	Console Classics		February 18, 2010				
Sorcerer's Maze	Console Classics		February 18, 2010				
Grandia	Game Arts		February 25, 2010		November 21, 2023	November 21, 2023	
Jigsaw Madness	Nippon Ichi Software		March 18, 2010				
One	Console Classics		March 18, 2010				
Perfect Weapon	Console Classics		March 25, 2010				
TNN Motorsports Hardcore 4X4	Console Classics		April 1, 2010				
XS Airboat Racing	Console Classics		April 8, 2010				
XS Junior League Dodgeball	Console Classics		April 15, 2010				
XS Moto	Console Classics		April 22, 2010				
Star Wars: Dark Forces	LucasArts		April 29, 2010	Unsupported			
Bomberman Fantasy Race	Konami		May 18, 2010	Unsupported			
Delta Force: Urban Warfare	NovaLogic	Unsupported	May 25, 2010				
N2O: Nitrous Oxide	Console Classics		June 1, 2010				
Bloody Roar 2	Konami		June 8, 2010	Unsupported			
Final Fantasy IX	Square Enix		June 15, 2010				
Motor Toon Grand Prix	Sony Interactive Entertainment		July 20, 2010				
A Bug's Life	Disney Interactive Studios		July 27, 2010				
Disney's Hercules: Action Game	Disney Interactive Studios		July 27, 2010				
The Emperor's New Groove	Disney Interactive Studios		July 27, 2010				
Toy Story Racer	Disney Interactive Studios		July 27, 2010				
Crash Team Racing	Sony Interactive Entertainment		August 10, 2010	Unsupported			
Theme Hospital	Electronic Arts		August 31, 2010				
Soviet Strike	Electronic Arts		September 14, 2010				
Chō Aniki: Kyūkyoku Muteki Ginga Saikyō Otoko	MonkeyPaw Games		September 20, 2010				
Gaia Seed	MonkeyPaw Games		September 20, 2010				
Arcade Hits: Outlaws of the Lost Dynasty	MonkeyPaw Games		October 5, 2010				
Magical Drop F - Daibouken Mo Rakujyanai!	MonkeyPaw Games	October 5, 2010	October 5, 2010				unavailable since 2012
Alundra	MonkeyPaw Games	October 12, 2010	October 12, 2010				
Arc the Lad	Sony Interactive Entertainment	October 12, 2010	October 12, 2010	August 28, 2012			
Arcade Hits: Shienryu	MonkeyPaw Games	October 19, 2010	October 19, 2010				
Tall Unlimited	MonkeyPaw Games	October 19, 2010	October 19, 2010				
Virtual Pool 3	Celeris	November 2, 2010	November 2, 2010				
Arcade Hits: Sonic Wings Special	MonkeyPaw Games	November 16, 2010	November 16, 2010				
Money Idol Exchanger	MonkeyPaw Games	November 16, 2010	November 16, 2010				
Arc the Lad II	Sony Interactive Entertainment	November 23, 2010	November 23, 2010				
Arc Arena: Monster Tournament	Sony Interactive Entertainment	November 23, 2010	November 23, 2010				
Blockids	Natsume Inc.	November 30, 2010	November 30, 2010				
Dezaemon Plus!	MonkeyPaw Games	November 30, 2010	November 30, 2010				
Galaxy Fight: Universal Warriors	Sunsoft	December 14, 2010	December 14, 2010				
Front Mission 3	Square Enix	December 21, 2010	December 21, 2010				
Arc the Lad III	Sony Interactive Entertainment	January 4, 2011	January 4, 2011				
Re-Loaded	Interplay Entertainment		January 4, 2011				
Metal Slug X	SNK Playmore		January 18, 2011				
Rockman	Capcom		January 18, 2011				
Rockman 2: Dr. Wily no Nazo	Capcom		February 1, 2011				
Harvest Moon: Back to Nature	Natsume Inc.		February 8, 2011		February 21, 2023	February 21, 2023	
Pocket Fighter	Capcom	Unsupported	February 8, 2011				
Reel Fishing II	Natsume Inc.		February 8, 2011				
Destrega	Koei Tecmo		February 15, 2011				
Romance of the Three Kingdoms IV: Wall of Fire	Koei Tecmo		February 15, 2011				
Saiyuki: Journey West	Koei Tecmo		February 15, 2011				
Xenogears	Square Enix		February 22, 2011				
Vagrant Story	Square Enix		March 1, 2011				
Lilo & Stitch: Trouble in Paradise	Disney Interactive Studios		March 8, 2011				
Monsters, Inc. Scream Team	Disney Interactive Studios		March 8, 2011				
Peter Pan: Adventures in Never Land	Disney Interactive Studios		March 8, 2011				
R4: Ridge Racer Type 4	Bandai Namco Entertainment		March 8, 2011		March 21, 2023	March 21, 2023	
Rockman 3: Dr. Wily no Saigo!?	Capcom		March 8, 2011				
Toy Story 2: Buzz Lightyear to the Rescue	Disney Interactive Studios		March 8, 2011		June 13, 2022	June 13, 2022	CBT
Buzz Lightyear of Star Command	Disney Interactive Studios				December 19, 2023	December 19, 2023	
Parasite Eve	Square Enix		March 15, 2011				
Legend of Mana	Square Enix		March 22, 2011				
Dino Crisis 2	Capcom		April 19, 2011				
Threads of Fate	Square Enix		April 19, 2011				
Missile Command	Atari		June 2, 2011				
Tekken	Bandai Namco Entertainment		June 3, 2011				
The Rapid Angel	MonkeyPaw Games		July 5, 2011				
Yakiniku Bugyō	MonkeyPaw Games	July 5, 2011	July 5, 2011				unavailable since 2012
Kyuiin	MonkeyPaw Games	July 19, 2011	July 19, 2011				unavailable since 2012
Breath of Fire IV	Capcom		August 16, 2011				
Parasite Eve II	Square Enix	August 23, 2011	August 23, 2011				
Rockman 4: Aratanaru Yabō!!	Capcom		September 6, 2011				
Cyberbots: Full Metal Madness	Capcom		September 13, 2011				
Pong: The Next Level	Atari	September 13, 2011	September 13, 2011				
Chrono Trigger	Square Enix	October 4, 2011	October 4, 2011				
XS Junior League Football	Console Classics		October 11, 2011				
Street Fighter Alpha 3	Capcom	October 18, 2011	October 18, 2011				
Monster Bass!	Console Classics	October 25, 2011	October 25, 2011				
Arcade Hits: Magical Drop	MonkeyPaw Games	November 2, 2011	November 2, 2011				unavailable since 2012
Dezaemon Kids!	MonkeyPaw Games		November 2, 2011				
Chrono Cross	Square Enix	November 8, 2011	November 8, 2011				
Vanguard Bandits	MonkeyPaw Games		November 15, 2011				
Final Fantasy V	Square Enix	November 22, 2011	November 22, 2011				
Darkstalkers: The Night Warriors	Capcom		November 29, 2011				
Final Fantasy VI	Square Enix	December 6, 2011	December 6, 2011				
Centipede	Atari		December 20, 2011				
Klonoa: Door to Phantomile	Bandai Namco Entertainment		December 27, 2011				
Final Fantasy Origins	Square Enix	January 10, 2012	January 10, 2012				
Darkstalkers 3	Capcom		April 24, 2012				
Future Cop: LAPD	Electronic Arts		April 24, 2012				
The Legend of Dragoon	Sony Interactive Entertainment		May 1, 2012		February 21, 2023	February 21, 2023	T
Myst	Cyan Worlds	Unsupported	May 15, 2012		June 5, 2025	June 5, 2025	T
Alone in the Dark: The New Nightmare	Atari		May 22, 2012	Unsupported	April 16, 2024	April 16, 2024	T
Tomba!	MonkeyPaw Games		June 19, 2012				
The Little Mermaid II	Disney Interactive Studios		June 26, 2012				
Mickey Mania	Disney Interactive Studios	July 12, 2012	July 12, 2012				
Turnabout	Natsume Inc.		September 25, 2012				
Art Camion Sugorokuden	GungHo Online Entertainment	Unsupported	December 4, 2012				
Finger Flashing	GungHo Online Entertainment		December 4, 2012				
Lup*Salad	GungHo Online Entertainment		December 4, 2012				
Makeruna! Makendō 2	GungHo Online Entertainment		December 4, 2012				
Vehicle Cavalier	GungHo Online Entertainment		December 4, 2012				
Zanac X Zanac	GungHo Online Entertainment		December 4, 2012				
Twisted Metal	Sony Interactive Entertainment	February 12, 2013	February 12, 2013	February 12, 2013	July 18, 2023	July 18, 2023	T
Persona 2: Eternal Punishment	Atlus	February 26, 2013	February 26, 2013				
Favorite Dear: Enkan no Monogatari	GungHo Online Entertainment		March 12, 2013				
First Queen IV	GungHo Online Entertainment	March 12, 2013	March 12, 2013				
Mahjong Uranai Fortuna: Tsuki no Megami-tachi	GungHo Online Entertainment	March 12, 2013	March 12, 2013				
Motorhead	Fox Interactive	March 12, 2013	March 12, 2013				
Rung Rung: Oz no Mahou Tsukai - Another World	GungHo Online Entertainment		March 12, 2013				
Sentimental Graffiti	GungHo Online Entertainment	March 12, 2013	March 12, 2013				
Trump Shiyouyo! Fukkoku-ban	GungHo Online Entertainment		March 12, 2013				
Hogs of War	Atari	March 19, 2013	March 19, 2013				
Evergreen Avenue	GungHo Online Entertainment	April 9, 2013	April 9, 2013				
Favorite Dear: Jyunpaku no Yogensha	GungHo Online Entertainment		April 9, 2013				
Mahjong Youchien: Tamago Gumi	GungHo Online Entertainment		April 9, 2013				
Zero Kara no Mahjong: Mahjong Tamago Gumi 2	GungHo Online Entertainment		May 7, 2013				
Motto Trump Shiyouyo! i-Mode de Grand Prix	GungHo Online Entertainment	May 7, 2013	May 7, 2013				
Zero Kara no Shogi: Shogi Youchien Ayumi Gumi	GungHo Online Entertainment		May 7, 2013				
Metal Gear Solid: VR Missions	Konami	November 26, 2013	November 26, 2013	November 26, 2013			
Double Dragon	MonkeyPaw Games		January 14, 2014				
Lucifer Ring	MonkeyPaw Games		January 21, 2014				
Cyber Sled	Bandai Namco Entertainment	January 28, 2014	January 28, 2014	January 28, 2014			unavailable since 2019
The Firemen 2: Pete & Danny	MonkeyPaw Games		January 28, 2014				
Gex: Enter the Gecko	Square Enix	February 4, 2014	February 4, 2014	Unsupported			
Pac-Man World 20th Anniversary	Bandai Namco Entertainment	February 11, 2014	February 11, 2014	February 11, 2014			
Wolf Fang	MonkeyPaw Games		February 11, 2014				
Mr. Driller	Bandai Namco Entertainment		February 18, 2014		June 13, 2022	June 13, 2022	unavailable since 2019
Tomba! 2: The Evil Swine Return	MonkeyPaw Games		February 18, 2014				
Herc's Adventures	LucasArts	February 25, 2014	February 25, 2014		June 20, 2023	June 20, 2023	T
Gunship	Microprose	March 18, 2014	March 18, 2014				
TNN Motorsports Hardcore TR	Console Classics	March 25, 2014	March 25, 2014				
Hyper Crazy Climber	MonkeyPaw Games		April 15, 2014				
Bust-a-Move 4	Square Enix	April 29, 2014	April 29, 2014				
Dragon Beat: Legend of Pinball	GungHo Online Entertainment		May 20, 2014				
Sarara's Little Shop	GungHo Online Entertainment		May 20, 2014				
Heroine Dream 2	GungHo Online Entertainment	May 20, 2014	May 20, 2014				
Neo Planet	GungHo Online Entertainment	May 20, 2014	May 20, 2014				
Tokyo 23-ku Seifuku Wars	GungHo Online Entertainment		May 20, 2014				
Heroine Dream	GungHo Online Entertainment		June 3, 2014				
All-Star Slammin' D-Ball	Agetec	July 29, 2014	July 29, 2014				
Card Games	Agetec	August 26, 2014	August 26, 2014				
Putter Golf	Agetec	August 26, 2014	August 26, 2014				
Mega Man X4	Capcom	September 2, 2014	September 2, 2014				
Mega Man X5	Capcom	September 9, 2014	September 9, 2014				
Namco Museum Volume 1	Bandai Namco Entertainment		September 30, 2014				unavailable since 2021
Namco Museum Volume 2	Bandai Namco Entertainment		September 30, 2014				unavailable since 2021
Namco Museum Volume 3	Bandai Namco Entertainment		September 30, 2014				unavailable since 2021
Namco Museum Volume 4	Bandai Namco Entertainment		September 30, 2014				unavailable since 2021
Namco Museum Volume 5	Bandai Namco Entertainment		September 30, 2014				unavailable since 2021
Strider 2	Capcom	October 7, 2014	October 7, 2014				
Vib-Ribbon	Sony Interactive Entertainment	October 7, 2014	October 7, 2014	October 7, 2014			
Kickboxing	Agetec	November 18, 2014	November 18, 2014				
Boxing	Agetec	November 25, 2014	November 25, 2014				
Chess	Agetec	December 2, 2014	December 2, 2014				
Suikoden II	Konami	December 9, 2014	December 9, 2014	December 9, 2014			
Xevious 3D/G+	Bandai Namco Entertainment	February 24, 2015	February 24, 2015				unavailable since 2019
Aces of the Air	Agetec		March 3, 2015				
Battle Hunter	Agetec	March 10, 2015	March 10, 2015				
Echo Night	From Software	March 17, 2015	March 17, 2015				
Armored Core	From Software	March 24, 2015	March 24, 2015		March 18, 2025	March 18, 2025	NCB
Armored Core: Project Phantasma	From Software				March 18, 2025	March 18, 2025	
Armored Core: Master of Arena	From Software				March 18, 2025	March 18, 2025	
Shadow Tower	From Software	March 31, 2015	March 31, 2015	March 31, 2015			
The Misadventures of Tron Bonne	Capcom		May 6, 2015				
Mega Man 8	Capcom	May 28, 2015	May 28, 2015	May 28, 2015			
Crossroad Crisis	Agetec	September 15, 2015	September 15, 2015				
Shooter: Space Shot	Agetec	September 15, 2015	September 15, 2015				
Puzzle Star Sweep	Agetec	September 22, 2015	September 22, 2015				
Racing	Agetec	September 22, 2015	September 22, 2015	September 22, 2015			
Mega Man Legends	Capcom	Unsupported	September 29, 2015				
Shooter: Starfighter Sanvein	Agetec	October 6, 2015	October 6, 2015				
Street Racquetball	Agetec	October 6, 2015	October 6, 2015				
Tecmo's Deception: Invitation to Darkness	Koei Tecmo	October 27, 2015	October 27, 2015	October 27, 2015			
Mega Man Legends 2	Capcom	April 5, 2016	April 5, 2016	April 5, 2016			
Worms	Team 17				June 20, 2023	June 20, 2023	NT
Worms World Party	Team 17				June 13, 2022	June 13, 2022	NT
Worms Armageddon	Team 17				June 13, 2022	June 13, 2022	NT
Worms Pinball	Team 17				May 21, 2024	May 21, 2024	
Star Wars: Demolition	Disney Interactive Studios				January 17, 2023	January 17, 2023	T
Star Wars: Episode I – The Phantom Menace	Disney Interactive Studios				January 16, 2024	January 16, 2024	T
Star Wars: Rebel Assault II: The Hidden Empire	Disney Interactive Studios				April 16, 2024	April 16, 2024	T
Twisted Metal III	Sony Interactive Entertainment				July 15, 2025	July 15, 2025	T
Twisted Metal 4	Sony Interactive Entertainment				July 15, 2025	July 15, 2025	T
Alone in the Dark: One-Eyed Jack's Revenge	THQ Nordic GmbH				April 15, 2025	April 15, 2025	T
MediEvil II	Sony Interactive Entertainment				January 21, 2025	January 21, 2025	T
Riven	Cyan Worlds				June 5, 2025	June 5, 2025	T
Tekken 3	Bandai Namco Entertainment				October 21, 2025	October 21, 2025	
Time Crisis	Bandai Namco Entertainment				May 12, 2026	May 12, 2026	
Ridge Racer	Bandai Namco Entertainment				January 14, 2026	May 12, 2026	

== See also ==
- List of PS one Classics (Japan)
- List of PS one Classics (PAL region)
- List of PlayStation Store TurboGrafx-16 games
- List of downloadable PlayStation 2 games
- High-definition remasters for PlayStation consoles
