= Crystal Castles (video game) =

1983 video game

- North American arcade flyer
- Developer: Atari, Inc.
- Publishers: Atari, Inc.
- Programmer: Franz Lanzinger
- Artists: Barbara Singh; Susan McBride
- Platform: Arcade: Acorn Electron, Amstrad CPC, Apple II, Atari 8-bit, Atari 2600, Atari ST, Apple II, BBC Micro, Commodore 64, ZX Spectrum
- Release: July 8, 1983: Arcade; July 8, 1983 Atari 2600; March 1984
- Genre: Maze
- Modes: Single-player, multiplayer

Crystal Castles is a 1983 maze video game developed and published by Atari, Inc. for arcades. The player controls Bentley Bear, who must collect gems located throughout trimetric-projected rendered castles while avoiding enemies, some of whom are after the gems as well.

The game was programmed by Franz Lanzinger and was the first game he ever developed. He joined Atari in 1983 and was initially tasked with making a game like Asteroids (1979). While he was developing the graphics that involved the unique backgrounds, the game began to evolve into what became Crystal Castles. The game also has warp zones to higher levels and an ending, which were not typical in arcade games in 1983.

Following the game's release in arcades, it was released for the Atari 2600 home console and various home computers. Critics often complimented the game for its unique graphics. Bentley Bear appeared in educational home computer programs from Atari, as well as in Atari Karts (1995) for the Jaguar. Lanzinger left Atari after developing the game and, following his attempt to get the rights to the character, developed the similarly styled game Gubble (1997).

== Gameplay ==
The first level of the arcade original. The initials of Franz Xaver Lanzinger–FXL here–are built into the castle.

Crystal Castles features Bentley Bear as the playable character. In the Arcade flyer, the narrative states that Bentley Bear went to the land of Crystal Castles to gather gemstones. The Atari 2600 manual alters the narrative slightly in that, after taking a nap, Bentley found himself in a gigantic castle where he was trapped by Berthilda the Witch. In order to escape, he had to collect gems while avoiding Berthhilda's minions.

In the original arcade game, the player controls Bentley with a trackball throughout a maze of 16 different playing fields. Bentley can also jump which allows him to avoid obstacles. The player must collect all the gemstones scattered throughout each maze to progress to the next level. Since some enemies eat the gems, players can earn bonus points for collecting the last gem on the board. Other items are sometimes present, like honeypots, that award bonus points when picked up. Different enemies follow unique patterns, such as trees that try to find the quickest path to Bentley and are stunned briefly if he jumps over them. The Gem Eaters can be defeated if Bentley runs into them while a gemstone is rising through their body. Each level has four waves; the fourth one features Berthilda the Witch, whom Bentley can defeat when he wears the magic hat located in the maze. The hat otherwise makes Bentley briefly invincible to enemies. In the ending, the players receive a congratulatory message and ranking based on how many lives they have and a bonus score based on how quickly they played, followed by an animation that reproduces rectangles.

== Development ==
Franz Lanzinger was the developer of Crystal Castles. Lanzinger had been programming on his own since 1971 and dropped out of a mathematics degree at the University of California, Berkeley to pursue a career in scientific research. Lanzinger was a fan of arcade games and when his friend Brian McGhie was hired by Atari as part of a testing group, Lanzinger was recommended to Atari by McGhie due to his proficiency in coding in assembly language, and was hired in 1982. It was the first game he ever developed. Lanzinger later thanked McGhee, including his initials "BBM" in a level in Crystal Castles.

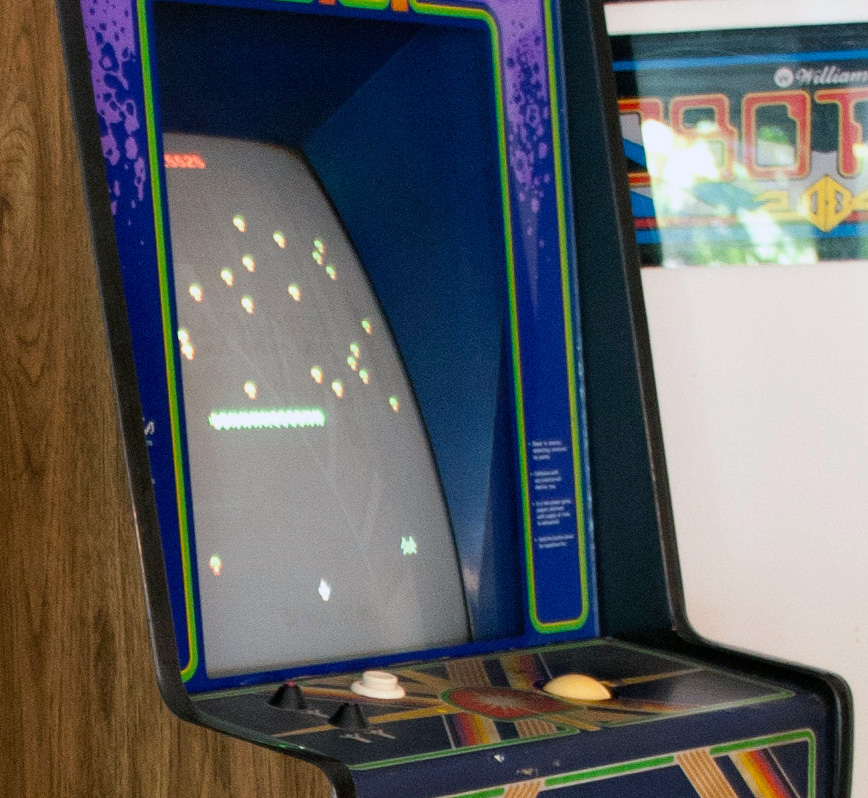
Franz Lasinger was fan of the arcade game Centipede (pictured) and Millipede which used a trackball for controls. This led to using one for Crystal Castles.

Upon arrival at the company, Lanzinger had to choose from a book on approved projects and picked one titled Toporoids, a variation of Atari's Asteroids (1979). He was without a development system for his first month at Atari, leading him to spend the first few months working on a mainframe computer creating three-dimensional backgrounds as the intended topology of the game. He recalled he would make five or so variants of the backgrounds each day. As he developed them, he began experimenting with them, and created an E.T.-like character that would move along the architecture. He started to feel like he could make a very different game than Toporoids.

At this time, there was no theme or enemies in the game. Lanzinger and some co-workers began thinking of ideas for the game and developed a fairy tale theme such as moving trees and a witch from The Wizard of Oz (1939). The idea of Bentley Bear came from these sessions. The bear was initially named Bear Braveheart, which was changed by Atari's marketing team because they feared it would be offensive to Indigenous people. A competition was held among the engineering team to rename the character; Bentley was chosen.

Lanzinger was a fan of the games Centipede (1981) and Millipede (1982), which used a trackball to control the game, leading to him using one in Crystal Castles. Towards the end of development, Lanzinger said Atari management had strongly encouraged him to switch to a joystick control scheme. He recalled that this motion did not go forward as the game became much worse through joystick control as it was not designed for it. Lanzinger wrote all the code for the game. Two graphic artists employed by Atari contributed to the art, including Barbara Singh, who created the majority of the motion objects, and Susan McBride, who also added a few. Lanzinger described the gameplay as "really just 3D Pac-Man." Atari programmer Dave Ralston helped design additional mazes when prototypes were being placed in arcades. Originally, there were 12 mazes; Ralston helped design some of the more complicated ones for the later portion of the game.

While developing the game, he spent $2,000 as a tax write-off playing arcade games as research. He stated that it was important to be accustomed to arcade games, which helped him "make good decisions about game design, it pushed me in the right direction." Watching other people play games like Tempest (1981) and having to take long periods of time to get to the skill level they wanted to be at inspired Lanzinger to include warps. This let advanced players get to the more difficult stages early on and to keep game time low for more income on a coin-op. The secret of the warps is shown later in the game to alert players to them.

Crystal Castles for the Atari ST was programmed by Andromeda Software, a company based in Hungary.

== Release ==
Crystal Castles was released for arcades on July 8, 1983. In Japan, Game Machine listed the game as the fifth most successful upright arcade unit of December 1983.

Both the original arcade and Atari 2600 versions of Crystal Castles were re-released in various compilation formats, such as the Atari Anniversary Edition for Dreamcast and PlayStation in 2001, Atari 80 in One for Windows in 2003 and the Atari Anthology for PlayStation 2 and Xbox in 2004, Atari Greatest Hits: Volume 2 for Nintendo DS in 2011, and Atari 50 for Nintendo Switch, PlayStation 4, Steam, and Xbox One in 2022.

== Reception ==
Reception

Review scores
Publication	Score		
Publication	Arcade	Atari 2600	C64
ACE			5/5
AllGame	4.5/5	3.5/5	
Computer and Video Games		80%	
Game Informer	8.5/10		
Zzap!64			45%
The Video Games Guide	2/5		

Reviewing the original arcade release, Bill Kunkel of Electronic Games described the sound and graphics as "top notch", but stated that what made Crystal Castles a solid game was its play value. Michael Blanchet of Electronic Fun with Computers & Games said that while "unimaginative maze games abound", Crystal Castles benefitted from a "fresh and novel approach." Roger C. Sharpe, writing in Play Meter, found the graphics and cabinet to have "stunning" artwork, and highlighted the personality, writing, "what's nice about the game is that players have a storyline. You do get a sense of movement as you finish a screen and then watch Bentley move to another as it quickly takes shape on screen." In Electronic Games 1985 Arkie Awards, Crystal Castles received a Certificate of Merit in the Coin-op Division. The award was a salute to "the upper crust of gameware" which did not win any major award.

The Atari 2600 port of Crystal Castles was released in March 1984. In 1984, several ports for Crystal Castles were announced, including the Commodore 64, Apple IIe, IBM Personal Computer, and VIC-20. In 1984, Andy Harris wrote in TV Gamer that none of the home versions had the superb graphic quality of the arcade game, which was constantly entertaining with several surprises. Reviewing versions for the BBC Micro and Commodore 64, "Nicky" of Computer and Video Games stated they "haven't played such a satisfying game of grab-the-loot-and-run for a long time," noting both versions ran quickly and were faithful copies of the arcade games. Reviewing the C64 release, the reviewers in Zzap! disagreed on the overall quality. One reviewer fond of the arcade game recommended it to fellow fans. Another felt it did not live up to the arcade game, while another said the game was "little more than glorified Pac-Man".

In retrospective reviews, Brett Alan Weiss of Allgame gave the arcade game a four and a half star rating out of five, noting the game had memorable characters, catchy music, addicting gameplay and was a "beautiful game." In 1995, Flux magazine ranked the game 95th on their "Top 100 Video Games." In his book The Video Games Guide, Matt Fox gave the arcade game a two out of five star rating, finding the building-block like graphics unappealing and that all the gems, enemies and Bentley appeared small, which made the game "worlds away" from the immediacy of Pac-Man. Reviewing the game in 1989, ACE commented that the arcade release was "one of the most addictive cabinets ever", and the budget release from home computers by Kixx was "ultimately pointless, yet totally unputdownable arcade entertainment." Zzap! re-reviewed the budget re-release; while finding it repetitive and difficult to control, ultimately they wrote that "the Pac-man concept still has a lot of strength (look at Pac-Mania on the Amiga) and this is one of the best versions around."

== Legacy ==
Following Crystal Castles, Lanzinger began development on an arcade machine based on the film Gremlins (1984). He visited the set, but left Atari after a dispute with them over residuals paid to coin-op developers for sales of home conversions. In an interview published in 2022, Lanzinger commented "I was young and naïve and felt that I owned Crystal Castles." He initially left the video game industry before working for Tengen on their ports of games like Toobin' and Ms. Pac-Man. Lanzinger stated that Crystal Castles remained his favorite game which he had worked on, but later said he did not think of the implications of using a trackball for the game, saying "In retrospect, having a trackball is a hindrance as it's hard to get the feel right with a different controller."

Crystal Castles did not receive a sequel. Lanzinger initially worked on one making a follow-up with new levels and giving Bentley Bear the ability to jump twice as high. Development on the sequel was never completed. In the mid-1990s, Lanzinger formed Actual Entertainment to create a sequel to Crystal Castles. The group could not get the rights, but they developed a similarly themed game titled Gubble (1997). Bentley Bear reappeared in educational programs such as Bentley Bear's Magical Math for the Atari ST and as a playable character in Atari Karts (1995) for the Atari Jaguar. In 2024, Atari announced the release of an updated version of their Atari 7800 console with the 7800+. The release would include a sequel to Crystal Castles titled Bentley Bear's Crystal Quest. The game is a platformer that was initially programmed by Bob DeCrescenzo as a homebrew title.

Crystal Castles includes warps, pre-dating their popular use in Super Mario Bros. (1985). It is also among the earliest arcade games to have a distinct ending. Lanzinger wrote a two-page memo to his bosses stating that if video games are aspiring to tell stories, they should have satisfying conclusions.

== See also ==
- List of Atari arcade games
- List of Atari, Inc. games (1972–1984)
