= Bass Pro Shops: The Strike =

2009 video game

- Developer(s): Piranha Games
- Publisher(s): XS Games/Psyclone
- Platform(s): Wii, Windows, Xbox 360
- Release: NA: October 6, 2009

Bass Pro Shops: The Strike is a fishing game developed by Piranha Games and published by XS Games for the Wii, Windows, and Xbox 360 in 2009. A similar title about hunting, Bass Pro Shops: The Hunt, later followed for Wii & Xbox 360 released on June 1, 2010. A Nintendo Switch port, dubbed Bass Pro Shops: The Strike - Championship Edition was released by Planet Entertainment on October 23, 2018.
