= Stahlfeder: Tekkou Hikuudan =

1996 Japanese video game

- Developer: Santos
- Publisher: Santos
- Producer: Akio Inoue
- Programmers: Masaru Miyashita; Sachiyo Oda
- Artist: Shinichi Tada
- Composers: Fumito Tamayama; Shigenori Masco
- Platform: PlayStation
- Release: JP: January 26, 1996
- Genre: Vertically scrolling shooter
- Mode: Single-player

Stahlfeder: Tekkou Hikuudan (Note: Japanese: シュタールフェーダー ～鉄甲飛空団～, Hepburn: Shutārufēdā: Tekkou Hikuudan, Stahlfeder: Armored Air Force) is a 1996 Japanese vertical scrolling shooter video game developed and published by Santos for the PlayStation. In the game, players assume the role of one the Allied Nation's four best pilots controlling a fighter plane in order to end the war against the invading Imperial Alliance. The game was generally poorly received by critics at the time and has since become an obscure title for the system.

== Gameplay ==
Gameplay screenshot

Stahlfeder is a vertical scrolling shooting game in the vein of the Raiden series, featuring six levels with a boss at the end of each. Players can select from four different types of planes, each with varying attack power, weaponry, speed, and durability. Each plane has two shot types; a wide shot that is weaker but has better spread, and a laser shot that deals more damage but at the cost of less screen coverage. Both the wide and laser shots have their own button, but both cannot be fired simultaneously. Screen-clearing bombs can also be fired that will erase every enemy and bullet on screen. Item carriers intermittently show up, and upon destruction will drop either a weapon upgrade (that cycles between red/blue, indicating wide or laser, respectively), a shield refill, or bombs. Instead of the traditional lives system employed in most shooting games, Stahlfeder has a shield system, with each plane being able to survive a certain number of attacks before being destroyed. If the player's shield is fully depleted, they must use a credit to continue; when all credits have been spent, the game is over.

Real time three dimensional graphics are used for bosses and some stage hazards. The game has three levels of difficulty, which determine how many credits the player is given, with Easy giving five, Normal giving three, and Hard giving only one. On Hard, whenever the player takes damage, both of their weapons are downgraded by one level.

== Plot ==
A power struggle between two countries has escalated into a war, with many neighboring countries becoming involved. 15 years later, the main belligerents, the Allied Nations and the Imperial Alliance, are still at war. Because of their superior military technology, the large scale of the Imperial Alliance's invasions have put the Allied Nations in dire straits. However, a chance at victory emerges upon the completion of four cutting-edge prototype fighter planes, created in the span of two years by a talented scientist who had defected from the Imperial Alliance and joined the Allied Nations' side. Seeing an opportunity to finally end the war, four pilots are chosen to fly the prototypes and sent into battle, forming a unit known as the Armored Air Force.

== Development and release ==
Developer Santos only made three games for the PlayStation before folding. The game was shown off at PlayStation Expo '96 in Tokyo. There it was shown off alongside another vertically scrolling shooting game, Gunbird by Atlus. The game features parallax scrolling, and polygons for several enemies and bosses in the game.

The game was released on January 26, 1996, for the Sony PlayStation console in Japan. The game has never been re-released for the PlayStation Network Game Archives.

== Reception ==
Reception

Review scores
Publication	Score
Famitsu	22/40
GameFan	51
Dengeki PlayStation	65/100, 70/100
Game Power	71
Play (UK)	65
MAN!AC	69%

The game generally received mixed reviews upon release. Four reviewers from Famitsu gave the game a score of 22 out of 40. The game was reviewed by several magazines outside of Japan. The Italian magazine Game Power gave it a positive score of 71 out of 100.

Three reviewers for Gamefan gave the game scores of 60, 38, 55, for a total of 51 out of 100. Several reviewers complained about the pace of the game, the lack of challenge, the music being repetitive, and it generally being boring. They did praise the variety of ships however, but noted that the game is better than Two-Tenkaku, but not other shooters on the system such as Gunbird, TwinBee Yahho, and Philosoma. Another reviewer pointed out that the graphics looked more like a 16-bit game, and another pointed out that it is only 30 minutes to beat. One reviewer compared the game to a "festering boil" and said "if you absolutely must have a shooter don't buy Stahlfeder!".

Next Generation was positive.

Edge Magazine

Video games preview.

UK magazine Play gave the game a score of 65%.

== See also ==
- Gaia Seed: Project Trap
