= The Red Star (video game) =

2007 video game

- Developers: Acclaim Studios Austin; Archangel Studios
- Publisher: XS Games
- Designers: Stephen Dupree; Peter Ong; Ara Shirinian
- Composer: Nelson Everhart
- Platforms: PlayStation 2, PlayStation Portable, iOS
- Release: PlayStation 2: PAL: April 20, 2007; NA: April 23, 2007; PlayStation Portable: NA: March 17, 2010; EU: January 5, 2011; iOS; June 22, 2010
- Genre: Action
- Modes: Single-player, multiplayer

The Red Star is a third person action video game, based on The Red Star graphic novel.

== Plot ==
The story is based on a graphic novel of the same name. It is set in a futuristic, magic-using Soviet Union, which uses floating Skyfurnaces (magical ships) and Warkasters (sorcerers) to conquer its enemies.

== Gameplay ==
The Red Star is a mix of several video game genres like beat'em up and shooter. The action is seen from the isometric perspective, with the goal of walking around and fighting enemies along the way. RPG elements are also apparent as players have the option of upgrading certain attributes of a character depending on how well levels are completed. The players can choose between three characters: Makita who relies on speed and fast movements, Kyuzo who is slow but resistant and strong and Maya with a balanced approach of speed and power. Maya is unlocked by beating the game once. Losing a life at any point will force a reset to the beginning of the current stage.

== Development and release ==
In 2003, Acclaim Entertainment signed an exclusive agreement with Archangel Studios to develop a video game based on The Red Star. At the time, it was in development at Acclaim Studios Austin with a scheduled release date in 2004. Ray Peña and Stephen Dupree were given the roles of art and design team leads respectively. Acclaim used an in-house level editor, which allowed them to create a Smash TV-like prototype by using the existing assets from Vexx and Turok Evolution.

The Red Star was originally scheduled for release for the PlayStation 2 and Xbox on September 4, 2004. The first time that gamers could get their hands on The Red Star was in August 2004 on the Official PlayStation Magazine Demo. Game Informer made an early review on both the PS2 and Xbox versions. The Xbox version was made in parallel with the PlayStation 2 version. It was completed with a press review copy circulating among gaming publications, including Game Informer, but was never commercially released.

After Acclaim went bankrupt in 2004, XS Games took the publishing rights to the game. The PlayStation Portable port was released in March 2010, through PlayStation Network. An iOS version of The Red Star was released in June the same year.

== Reception ==
Reception

Aggregate scores
Aggregator	Score			
Aggregator	iOS	PS2	PSP	Xbox
GameRankings	76%	74%	74%	80%
Metacritic	66/100	72/100	71/100	N/A

Review scores
Publication	Score			
Publication	iOS	PS2	PSP	Xbox
1Up.com	N/A	B	B	N/A
Destructoid	4/10	N/A	N/A	N/A
Edge	N/A	6/10	N/A	N/A
Eurogamer	N/A	7/10	N/A	N/A
Game Informer	N/A	7.5/10	N/A	7.5/10
GamePro	N/A	4.5/5	N/A	N/A
GameSpot	N/A	8.1/10	N/A	N/A
GameSpy	N/A	3.5/5	N/A	N/A
IGN	N/A	6.9/10	6.5/10	N/A
PlayStation Official Magazine – UK	N/A	(OPS2) 6/10; 3/10	8/10	N/A
Pocket Gamer	3/5	N/A	N/A	N/A
PlayStation: The Official Magazine	N/A	6/10	N/A	N/A

The game received "average" reviews on all platforms according to the review aggregation website Metacritic.

== Notes ==
1. Vo, Long (October 6, 2006). "The Red Star Review (PS2)". The Next Level. Archived from the original on July 28, 2008.
