= Commando: Steel Disaster =

2008 video game

- Developer(s): Mana Computer Software
- Publisher(s): XS Games; Cinemax (DSi)
- Platform(s): Nintendo DS
- Release: NA: September 2, 2008; EU: December 22, 2011
- Genre(s): Run and gun
- Mode(s): Single-player

Commando: Steel Disaster is a run and gun video game for the Nintendo DS developed by Mana Computer Software.

== Plot ==
The story begins when several sectors of a military group report being attacked by their own war machines. A terrorist organization led by a man named Rattlesnake is assumed to be responsible. A commando and vehicle specialist code-named Storm is assigned to enter each affected area and progressively stop Rattlesnake's ambitions.

== Gameplay ==
Storm is controlled by the player during all phases of warfare. The player's goal is to advance through each level while gathering weapons and ammo in order to survive long enough and have enough ammo to face off against the boss at the end of each level. The storyline progresses at the beginning of each stage as Storm's communications officer, Jessica, informs him of his next mission.

Players can hold up to two firearms, which they can switch between, and can also hold a certain amount of hand grenades.

The player has no extended or extra life bonuses. If a player dies, a "game over" screen appears followed by the player restarting the current mission from the beginning. Players can start and save their own profiles, but it is necessary to complete the first level before progress can be saved. Storm occasionally commands a vehicle, which mostly happens at the beginning of the game, but additionally by the game's climax. The gameplay is similar to that of Metal Slug. The game has five stages of combat in a 2D, hand-drawn style.

== Reception ==
Reception

Aggregate score
Aggregator	Score
Metacritic	64/100

Review scores
Publication	Score
GameSpot	6/10
GameZone	8/10
IGN	6/10
NGamer	67%
Nintendo Life	5/10 stars
Retro Gamer	73%

Commando: Steel Disaster received "mixed" reviews according to the review aggregation website Metacritic.
