= Rebel Raiders: Operation Nighthawk =

2005 video game

- Developer: Kando Games
- Publishers: EU: Nobilis; NA: XS Games; EU: Kando Games (Wii)
- Platforms: PlayStation 2, Windows, Wii
- Release: PlayStation 2, Windows: FRA: October 14, 2005; UK: March 3, 2006; NA: March 21, 2006 (PS2); NA: May 30, 2006 (PC); Wii: NA: September 23, 2008; EU: October 23, 2008
- Genres: Action, Flight
- Mode: Single-player

Rebel Raiders: Operation Nighthawk (or Rebel Raiders) is an action flight video game developed by French studio Kando Games for Windows, Wii, and PlayStation 2 (PS2). The Windows and PlayStation 2 versions were released in 2005, while the Wii version was released on September 23, 2008.

== Gameplay ==
The game features homing missiles that allow the player to target multiple enemies at once.

There are twenty planes available for use, each featuring its own special weapons such as machine guns, missiles, and homing missiles. Health is lost when the player's "shield" is completely broken, but the shield's health can be replenished by destroying enemies. Planes can only be unlocked by completing challenges.

=== Plot ===
Operation Nighthawk is set in the near future after the human race gained control over the Solar System under the name of the Union of World Nations (UWN). During its quest to expand deeper into the Solar System, the Union of World Nation's purpose shifted and corrupted. Because of their tyranny, a rebellion was built inside of the Union's own people named the Alliance of Independent States (AIS)(a group of small countries). The Alliance battles the Union via small, constant, air-based battles in an attempt to gain freedom. The player plays as the leader of the Ghost Squadron of the Alliance of Independent States Air Forces (AISAF), fighting the Union in a total of 16 levels.

== Reception ==
Reception

Review scores
Publication	Score
GameSpot	5.4/10 (PS2); 3.5/10 (Wii)
GameZone	6.3/10 (PS2)
IGN	5/10 (PS2); 4/10 (Wii)

Jeff Haynes of IGN applauded the PS2 version of Operation Nighthawk for its arcade handle feel and noted that it was enjoyable to unlock the new planes. The cutscenes were cited as very impressive, but the gameplay graphics did not compare to those of the cutscenes. He also criticized the game for its very small three-song soundtrack and noted that the game is beatable in one sitting due to the lack of difficulty levels. "Rebel Raiders isn't exactly what flight fans are looking for in terms of a must have purchase. The aerial action is okay, but you're really missing out on a lot of mission pacing, replay value and even challenge with this easily completed game. Unless you're a hardcore fan simply looking to acquire every single flight title out there (it is only 20 bucks, after all), you probably should look elsewhere for your air combat."

GameSpot's Bob Colayco considered the PS2 version to be repetitive, while Louis Bedigian of GameZone stated, "For those who really love the genre, it's actually worth the price." IGN's Mark Bozon criticized the Wii version's artificial intelligence and graphics, and stated that while some of the game's ideas "could have worked nicely, the game is plagued by sketchy motion controls and an overall cheap feel." GameSpot's Carolyn Petit, reviewing the Wii version, stated that when the game was originally released for PS2 and PC, it was "already way behind the times – a simple, unimpressive air combat game that did nothing to stand out from the pack." Petit stated that the Wii version "is best ignored," calling it "generic and disposable."
