= Super PickUps =

2007 video game

- Developer: Milestone srl
- Publisher: XS Games
- Platforms: PlayStation 2, Wii
- Release: PlayStation 2: NA: 25 September 2007; EU: 28 November 2008; Wii: NA: 15 September 2008
- Genre: Racing
- Modes: Single-player, multiplayer

Super PickUps is a truck racing game developed by Milestone and published by XS Games. It was released in September 2007 for PlayStation 2 and in September 2008 for Wii.

This game provides the same racing thrills as Super Trucks but downsized to tricked-out pickups. Race on 20 different master challenging tracks and earn big cash to upgrade the suspension, engine, tires, and body of your trucks. There are 16 unique truck body's to choose from. Each one has unique handling. The player can choose between dry or wet weather. Wet weather makes the trucks more slick and tougher to race with.

== Gameplay modes ==
Mode name	Description
Quick Race	Choose the truck, team, livery, track, lap number, and weather conditions
Multiplayer	Choose any truck, team, and track from the start. The player can compete in a head-to-head race, a series of races, or in damaged trucks called Survivor.
Career Mode	Choose a team and compete in 4 different championships to move on to the next season. There are 5 different seasons. Earn rewards by following teams requests. Earn money to buy upgrades and body types.
Challenges	Complete 7 different challenges: Nitro, Handling, Top Speed, Braking, Damage, Overtaking, and Time Limit. There are 3 difficulty levels for each challenge.
Practice	There are 2 ways to practice: against opponents or against the clock. In Vs. opponents, the player chooses a track and vehicle to race against customized opponents. In Vs. clock, the player plays against a ghost of their previous best performance.
