= Gubble =

1997 video game

- North American PlayStation box art
- Developers: Actual Entertainment (Macintosh, Windows); Goo! (PlayStation)
- Publishers: Actual Entertainment (Macintosh, Windows, iOS); Mud Duck Productions; Midas Interactive Entertainment (PlayStation)
- Composer: Seppo Hurme
- Series: Gubble
- Platforms: Windows, PlayStation, Macintosh, iOS
- Release: May 1997: Windows; May 1997 PlayStation; EU: April 12, 2001; NA: June 15, 2002
- Genre: Puzzle
- Mode: Single-player

Gubble is a 1997 puzzle video game developed by Actual Entertainment (Eric Ginner, Mark Robichek and Franz Lanzinger) for Microsoft Windows, Macintosh and PlayStation. The player controls Gubble D. Gleep, an alien sent to the fictional planet of Rennigar to remove zymbots that have been fastened there by space pirates. Most of the gameplay requires the player to solve a series of real-time puzzles using tools such as a hammer or a screwdriver. Gubble uses the tools in a humorous way to remove things like nails and screws from the playing area. The non-violent gameplay was a key aspect mentioned in the game's promotional material.

Gubble was later re-released for iOS in 2010.

== Gameplay ==
Gubble is composed of 10 cities (functioning as worlds); across these are various levels known as "Zymbots", which are usually maze-like in appearance. They are each filled with several enemies and tools. In the PC version of the game, each zymbot is named the same as that of the city plus an additional letter added to the end. For example, the game's first zymbot, which is in a city named "Rennigar", is called Rennigara, while the seventh is called Rennigarp. These zymbots may include bonus levels within them, such as "bonus zymbots", which function as minigames or "special zymbots", which are generally more difficult.

Tools are made to resemble those of a carpenter. A hammer, drill, screwdriver, socket, saw, and a sledgehammer are just a few of the tools used to deconstruct a level. Tools can be found within a zymbot and are used to remove the several nails, screws, hex nuts, etc., which hold a level together. Some tools have other uses, such as moving crates or breaking rocks which serve as obstructions in a level.

== Legacy ==
Gubble 2 was released in 1998 for Windows. With similar gameplay to the first game, it contains 124 levels (or zymbots), and features new tools and enemies. One notable difference is that in Gubble 2, Gubble walks around the mazes instead of hovering. From 2000, the game was fully playable online at PlayMachine.net, using pay-per-play tokens (PlayMachine.net was an attempt to bring game arcades online). The game came with ZymEdit, a piece of software to edit, or make new, levels for the game. The game has another soundtrack of instrumental songs composed again by Seppo Hurme.

Gubble Buggy Racer was released in 2000. In the game, the player competes in buggy races across 8 different worlds (or tracks). The player can choose from Championship, Single Race or Time Trial modes as well as two player Head to Head or Deathmatch options. Unlike the non-violent gameplay of Gubble and Gubble 2, Gubble Buggy Racer contains a variety of super weapons to defeat the opponents. The game contains the same soundtrack as Gubble 2.

Gubble HD is an enhanced version of the original Gubble game that was released in 2007 on PC (as a 10th anniversary edition) and 2010 on the iPad. It contains new scoring, HD graphics, and three difficulty levels. At the same time as the iPad release, the original Gubble game was released on iOS.

The original Gubble game was released on the PlayStation Store in September 2011.

In 2012, Actual Entertainment started a Kickstarter campaign to raise funds for a game titled Gubble 3D. It raised $1,249 of the $80,000 aim.

By 2014, Actual Entertainment was developing Android endless runner game Gubble Vacation Rush.

In 2017, Lanzinger Studio (the new name of Actual Entertainment) started development on Gubble 20th Anniversary Edition.

As of 2020, Lanzinger Studio was developing a remaster of Gubble 2 for modern computers, supporting Windows 10, widescreen monitors, and not requiring a disc drive to play. Their website also mentions work into a remake of the original Gubble in the Unity engine.

== See also ==
- Crystal Castles (an arcade game with similar gameplay, also developed by Franz Lanzinger)
- K.S.-n-Kickin (a game identical to Gubble 2, but with changed graphics and sound effects)
