= Tomba! =

1997 video game

- North American cover art
- Developer: Whoopee Camp
- Publishers: JP: Whoopee Camp; WW: Sony Computer Entertainment
- Director: Tokuro Fujiwara
- Producer: Tokuro Fujiwara
- Designers: Tokuro Fujiwara; Toshihiko Uda; Masayoshi Kurokawa
- Programmers: Toshihiko Uda; Masayoshi Kurokawa
- Artist: Tokuro Fujiwara
- Writers: Masayoshi Kurokawa; Akira Kinoshita
- Composer: Harumi Fujita
- Platform: PlayStation
- Release: JP: December 25, 1997; NA: July 16, 1998; EU: August 28, 1998
- Genre: Metroidvania
- Mode: Single-player

Tomba!, (Note: Ore! Tomba (オレっ!トンバ, Ore! Tonba; lit. "Me! Tomba") in Japan) known as Tombi! in Europe, is a 1997 Metroidvania game developed and published by Whoopee Camp for the PlayStation. It was released in Japan in 1997 and internationally by Sony Computer Entertainment the following year. The game centers on the eponymous feral child as he attempts to recover his grandfather's bracelet from an evil race of anthropomorphic pigs.

Creator Tokuro Fujiwara developed Tomba! after leaving Capcom in 1995, founding Whoopee Camp as director, producer and lead designer. He chose the game's 2D side-scrolling perspective for the format's straightforward nature, and created a non-linear "event" system to differentiate it from other platformers.

Tomba! was received positively by critics, with praise for its controls, visuals, and varied gameplay objectives. However, the game's audio received a more mixed reception. Despite the game's lackluster commercial performance, it was followed by a sequel in 1999, Tomba! 2: The Evil Swine Return. Tomba! maintained a cult following years after its debut, and was re-released on the PlayStation Network in 2011. Limited Run Games released an enhanced version for the Nintendo Switch, PlayStation 5 and Windows in 2024, with a PlayStation 4 version the following year.

== Gameplay ==
An example of gameplay in Tomba!. The title character attacks enemies such as the Koma Pig below him by leaping onto and biting into their backs before tossing them.

Tomba! is an open world Metroidvania game with RPG elements. The player controls the titular character Tomba, who must explore his home island, defeat the evil Koma Pigs and recover his grandfather's golden bracelet. Most of the game takes place in a side-scrolling perspective. However, Tomba can occasionally climb over walls to move between the foreground and background as separate areas. Some areas allow the player to explore them in an isometric view. Along with the ability to jump, Tomba can attack enemy characters by leaping onto and biting into their back before tossing them in a straightforward trajectory. Tomba can also attack enemies by obtaining various weapons, such as flails and boomerangs. Signposts scattered throughout the environment state how to use the game's controls and abilities, while a select few can be used to save the player's progress.

When Tomba interacts with a certain character or environmental element, an "event" may be initiated, in which Tomba is given a task to accomplish or an obstacle to overcome. Such events may consist of finding a lost item, rescuing a stranded character or clearing a blockade in the imminent path. Upon completing an event, the player is rewarded with "Adventure Points", which can be used to access additional events and unlock specifically marked chests. Multiple events can be undertaken at once and often do not require being cleared in any specific order. The game features an inventory system that displays the player's current collection of items and events. The game includes a total of 130 events.

The player begins the game with a maximum of four "vitality points" that are represented as a series of yellow bars on the upper-left corner of the screen. Tomba loses a vitality point if he is hit by an enemy, touches a sharp object, or falls into deep water. Vitality points can be restored by eating fruit. When all vitality points are depleted or if Tomba falls down a bottomless chasm, the player loses a life. If all lives are lost, the game is over.

== Plot ==
Years ago on an uncharted archipelago, a group known as the Seven Evil Pigs appeared and used their magical powers to tarnish the land. Their underlings, the Koma Pigs, began terrorizing the populace with their mischievous pranks. Years later, a curious and energetic boy named Tomba diligently protects his grandfather's grave and wears a gold bracelet as an heirloom. One day, Tomba's bracelet is stolen following a confrontation with a group of Koma Pigs. He pursues them to a nearby village, where he is directed to the 100-Year-Old Wise Man. The Wise Man tells the story of the Seven Evil Pigs' rise to power, and reveals that the Koma Pigs are stockpiling gold. He advises Tomba to find his bracelet by hunting the seven Evil Pigs hiding throughout the land. He also describes the Evil Pig Bags that could reveal the Pigs' hiding places, and suggests learning more from the Dwarf Elder in the next village. The Dwarf Elder gives Tomba a blue Pig Bag and tells him that the Bags can reveal the entrance to an Evil Pig's hideout if Tomba approaches it. However, he warns that the individual Evil Pigs do not hide in the same area where they have cast their spell. Tomba explores the continent and gathers the rest of the Pig Bags. In the midst of his travels, an older Wise Man informs Tomba that the gold being hoarded by the Seven Evil Pigs is the source of their power. After Tomba captures the Seven Evil Pigs and lifts their spells over the land, an eighth Evil Pig Bag manifests within his possession and reveals the lair of the Evil Pigs' creator and leader, the Real Evil Pig. After defeating the Real Evil Pig in his trove of gold, Tomba recovers his bracelet and leaves it resting upon his grandfather's grave.

== Development ==
Tomba! was created by Tokuro Fujiwara, who left Capcom in December 1995 after 13 years as an employee. Fujiwara's motivation stemmed from a desire to create new and original games, which he felt he was unable to do within Capcom. Upon exhausting his accumulated vacation days, Fujiwara resigned immediately following the release of Resident Evil. Fujiwara soon established the independent development studio Whoopee Camp, and became the director, producer and lead designer of the studio's debut game Tomba!.

Fujiwara chose to make a side-scrolling game as he believed this fundamental experience would excite players in a straightforward way. To distinguish Tomba! from other action games, Fujiwara designed a non-linear event system, as well as Tomba's gradual growth in abilities and resources. Tomba!'s score was composed by Fujiwara's longtime Capcom collaborator Harumi Fujita, who eagerly approached Fujiwara for a position upon learning of Whoopee Camp's establishment. The game's Japanese version features the song "Paradise" by Tokyo Channel Q as its opening theme, and "Que Serã Serã" by Fumitaka Fuchigami as the ending theme.

== Release ==
Tomba! was released in Japan on December 25, 1997. Promotional plush figures of Tomba and a Koma Pig were distributed in limited quantities around the game's original release date. The figures were also offered as prizes in a sweepstake run by Gamers' Republic in 1999.

The international publishing rights for Tomba! were given to Sony Computer Entertainment. Tomba! was released in North America on July 16, 1998, and in Europe on August 28, 1998. The international release was improved, with shorter load times, more responsive controls, Gouraud shading on background elements, and other visual improvements. The intro theme "Paradise" was retained for the American release, but with the vocals removed. The game is titled Tombi! in European territories; Erik Engström of Hardcore Gaming 101 speculated the change was motivated by the fact that "tomba" is an Italian word meaning "grave" (cognate with the English "tomb"). The opening theme for the European version is "No Sweat" by North & South, which was also used as the theme song of the television series of the same name. From March to May 1999, the game was one of five involved in the "Gimme Five" promotion, a campaign by Sony and General Mills that distributed $5 discount coupons toward select PlayStation titles through six leading General Mills breakfast cereals.

Tomba! was re-released on the PlayStation Network in Japan on July 6, 2011. Distributor MonkeyPaw Games spent one year formulating an English-language distribution deal with Sony and Fujiwara. The English-language version of Tomba! was re-released on the PlayStation Network in North America on June 19, 2012 and in Europe on October 3, 2012. The deal between MonkeyPaw Games, Sony and Fujiwara did not initially include the game's sequel, and the involved parties elected to wait until Tomba!'s re-release showed satisfactory sales figures before arranging the sequel's re-release. In the month of its North American debut, Tomba! was the third best-selling PSOne Classic.

=== Special edition ===
On July 12, 2023, Limited Run Games announced they would be working with Fujiwara to release an enhanced version of Tomba! on Nintendo Switch, PlayStation 4, PlayStation 5 and Windows. Tomba! Special Edition, was released on PlayStation 5, Nintendo Switch and Steam on August 1, 2024, with the PlayStation 4 version launching in 2025.

The special edition runs on Limited Run Games' Carbon Engine (a modified version of PCSX-Rearmed) and features a new soundtrack by Fujita. The soundtrack for the enhanced version is arranged from the original compositions Fujita created with a synthesizer, as opposed to the tracks from the PlayStation version, which used sampled audio. The special edition is not an enhanced port as such, but instead the original ROM running with some enhancements such as save states available. Additionally, a "museum mode" features game documentation, art assets and advertising material.

== Reception ==
Reception

Aggregate score
Aggregator	Score
GameRankings	84%

Review scores
Publication	Score
AllGame	4/5
CNET Gamecenter	8/10
Edge	6/10
Electronic Gaming Monthly	9/10, 9/10, 8.5/10, 8.5/10
Famitsu	8/10, 9/10, 8/10, 6/10
Game Informer	8.25/10
GameRevolution	B+
GameSpot	8/10
IGN	8.7/10
Next Generation	4/5
Official U.S. PlayStation Magazine	4/5
Pocket Gamer	(PSP) 3/5
Push Square	8/10
Dengeki PlayStation	75/100, 60/100

Tomba! received favorable reviews according to the review aggregation website GameRankings. In Japan, Famitsu gave it a score of 31 out of 40.

The events were praised for their variety, quantity, and non-linearity. Mark Cooke of GameRevolution noted that Tomba! was the first platform game to grant such freedom, following attempts by RPGs like The Elder Scrolls II: Daggerfall. However, John Ricciardi of Electronic Gaming Monthly and Joe Rybicki of Official U.S. PlayStation Magazine warned that the overlapping events may easily result in players getting sidetracked. The side-scrolling segments were considered reminiscent of platform games from earlier generations, particularly Fujiwara's past titles Ghosts 'n Goblins and Ghouls 'n Ghosts. Cooke, however, felt that the lack of innovation made the gameplay "a little too tired". Several reviewers praised the responsiveness of the controls. Rybicki cited the high amount of load times as a negative point, and John Broady of GameSpot criticized the limited save system as a "chore", suggesting that a system which saves the game after each event would have been more logical.

The game's visuals were lauded for their bright and colorful presentation, smooth character animation, and combination of 2D character sprites and 3D polygonal environments. Crispin Boyer of Electronic Gaming Monthly compared the game's visuals to Klonoa: Door to Phantomile, particularly in the "almost perfect marriage" of its disparate graphical elements. Cooke described the hand-drawn cutscenes as endearing and humorous, and regarded the introduction to be the game's best feature. All four reviewers for Electronic Gaming Monthly appreciated the eccentric and lightly humorous tone, as did Rybicki, who found the game refreshing after a glut of post-apocalyptic three-dimensional third-person shooters at E3 1998. Erik Engström of Hardcore Gaming 101 saw influences by various anime from the late 1970s and early 1980s; he compared the game's rural and fantastical setting and occasional scatological references to Akira Toriyama's Dr. Slump, and compared the Koma Pigs to the Yatterman character Odate Buta.

Reactions to the audio were more mixed. Some were impressed by the soundtrack and considered it catchy, with Cooke declaring that the game "may set a new high water mark for platformers." Others were more apathetic, with Bro Buzz of GamePro finding the sound effects "minimal to an extreme" and claiming that the music was "limited to one catchy but repetitive, goofy tune". (Note: GamePro gave the game 4/5 for graphics, 3/5 for sound, and two 4.5/5 scores for control and fun factor.)

== Sequel ==
Despite Tomba!'s positive critical reception, its commercial performance proved unremarkable; the game did not sell enough copies to qualify for inclusion in Sony's Greatest Hits, although it sold well enough to justify a sequel. Whoopee Camp released Tomba! 2: The Evil Swine Return for the PlayStation in 1999, and the game was also met with positive reviews. However, it sold less than its predecessor and Whoopee Camp disbanded after its release. Tomba! later garnered a cult following.
