= Gaia Seed: Project Trap =

1996 video game

Gaia Seed: Project Seed Trap
- Developer: Techno Soleil Corporation
- Publisher: Techno Soleil Corporation
- Director: Yoshiyuki Hashidume
- Producer: Yoshiyuki Hashidume
- Programmers: Tomoyuki Hashidume; Yoshiyuki Hashidume
- Composer: Naoto Ishikawa
- Platform: PlayStation
- Release: JP: December 13, 1996
- Genre: Horizontal-scrolling shooter
- Mode: Single-player

Gaia Seed: Project Seed Trap is a 1996 Japanese side scrolling shooting game for the PlayStation.

== Gameplay ==
Gameplay features a rechargeable shield for the ship.

== Development ==
The game was developed by Techno Soleil, the same developers as Rapid Angel.

== Release ==
Gaia Seed was released in Japan on December 13, 1996. It was re-released on the PlayStation Network on July 8, 2009, and retailed for 571円. The game is considered quite rare. A 2005 United Kingdom listing gave the price as £50-£80, while a 2014 listing put the game at £80.

The game was released on PlayStation Network Imports for purchase outside of Japan on September 21, 2010. Previously, the only way to purchase the game outside of Japan on PSN was to use a Japanese PSN account. The game was released with no language localisation or translation. Publisher MonkeyPaW Games cites the cost of translation as a barrier to releasing games outside of Japan.

== Reception ==
Reception

Review score
Publication	Score
Dengeki PlayStation	40/100, 55/100

Famitsu magazine gave it a score of 22 out of 40.

Eurogamer called it "quite dull". GamesTM said that it looked like a 16 bit game, but that it was enjoyable, and was more for the hardcore fans of the genre. Silliconera praised the game, and compared it to the Gradius series.

== See also ==
- Stahlfeder: Tekkou Hikuudan
