= Actual Entertainment =

- Industry: Video games
- Founded: 1996
- Headquarters: Sunnyvale, California
- Website: Actual Entertainment

Actual Entertainment was a video game development and publishing company founded in 1996 by Franz Lanzinger (Chairman) and Mark Robichek (President). They were primarily known for their development of the Gubble series. Actual Entertainment was acquired by Lanzinger Studio in December 2016.

== Games ==
Title	Year of first release	Platform
Gubble	1997	Windows, PlayStation, iOS
Gubble 2	1998	Windows
Gubble Buggy Racer	2000	Windows
Gubble HD	2007	Windows, iPad
