= Racing (video game) =

1999 video game

- Developer: Tamsoft
- Publishers: JP: Culture Publishers; NA: Agetec (Note: Released under the A1 Games label); EU: Midas Interactive Entertainment (Note: Released under the Midas Touch label)
- Platform: PlayStation
- Release: JP: July 22, 1999; NA: January 2001; EU: May 2, 2003
- Genre: Racing
- Mode: Single-player

Racing, known in Japan as Simple 1500 Series Vol. 13: The Race, (Note: Japanese: SIMPLE 1500 シリーズ Vol.13 THE レース, Hepburn: Shinpuru 1500 Shirīzu Vol. 13 Za Rēsu) and in Europe as Pro Racer, is a racing video game developed by Tamsoft for the PlayStation. It was originally published by Culture Publishers as part of their Simple 1500 series of budget titles in 1999. It was eventually localised and released by Agetec in North America in 2000, and Midas Interactive Entertainment in Europe in 2003.

== Reception ==
Reception

Review scores
| Publication | Score |
|---|---|
| AllGame | 1/5 |
| Electronic Gaming Monthly | 2.5/10 |
| Famitsu | 17/40 |
| Jeuxvideo.com | 2/20 |
| Official U.S. PlayStation Magazine | 0.5/5 |
| PlayStation: The Official Magazine | 2/10 |

The game received negative reviews. In Japan, Famitsu gave it a score of 17 out of 40.
