= XS Games =

American video game publisher

XS Games, LLC
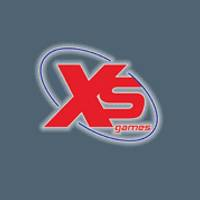
- Industry: Video games
- Founded: 2002
- Founder: Steve Grossman
- Defunct: 2011(?)
- Headquarters: New York City (prior), Fairfield, Connecticut (current)
- Services: Localization and publishing
- Owner: ePartners LLC
- Website: http://www.xsgames.biz/

XS Games, LLC was a New York-based publisher of value-priced video games, operating in North America and Europe, that released titles on numerous different consoles as well as one title on the iPhone.

== History ==
The company was founded in 2002 by Steve Grossman, the former founder and boss of the defunct game publisher ASC Games. Initially publishing PlayStation games, the company acquired the publishing rights to Syberia in 2003, and after the success of the title, acquired publishing rights to Microids games in 2004.

The company also obtained the rights to the Ten Pin Alley IP from the remnants of the defunct ASC Games, and released the sequel for the Game Boy Advance in 2004 and then for Wii in 2008. In 2004, the company released XS Moto for the Game Boy Advance, a conversion of the PlayStation title. Also that year, the company acquired the rights to Pure Pinball, and set for a release on Xbox.

In 2007, the company announced The Red Star, adapted from a title by the busted game developer Acclaim Entertainment, for a release in 2007. A year later, it teamed up with developer Broadsword Interactive, to create PopStar Guitar for the PlayStation 2 and Wii, with the Wii version coming packaged with a controller accessory that would clip on the front of the Wii Remote, called the AirG.

Despite having no new releases since 2011, their web site continued to stay online and in 2018, was updated to show that they were now part of ePartners LLC and that their corporate headquarters had been moved to a residential address. The web site now just displays a domain parking page. It is unclear what the company's future is.

== Publications ==
=== Sony PlayStation games ===
- Hugo: The Evil Mirror
- Jigsaw Madness(a.k.a. Jigsaw Island: Japan Graffiti)
- Mobile Light Force (a.k.a. Gunbird)
- Monster Bass!
- Sol Divide
- Sorcerers Maze (a.k.a. Prism Land)
- Superstar Dance Club #1 Hitz(a.k.a Love Para - Lovely Tokyo Parapara Girl)
- Virtual Pool 3
- XS Airboat Racing
- XS Junior League Football
- XS Junior League Dodgeball(a.k.a Dodge DE Ball!)
- XS Junior League Soccer
- XS Moto

=== Sony PlayStation 2 games ===
- Castle Shikigami 2
- Digital Hitz Factory
- DT Racer
- Funkmaster Flex's Digital Hitz Factory
- Mobile Light Force 2 (a.k.a. Shikigami No Shiro)
- PopStar Guitar
- Rebel Raiders: Operation Nighthawk
- Still Life
- Super PickUps
- Super Trucks Racing
- The Red Star
- War Chess
- Rebel Raiders

=== Microsoft Xbox Games ===
- Knights Apprentice, Memorick's Adventures
- Pure Pinball
- Still Life
- Syberia
- Syberia II

=== Nintendo DS games ===
- Commando: Steel Disaster
- Aqua Panic!

=== Nintendo Game Boy Advance games ===
- Ten Pin Alley
- Thunder Alley
- XS Moto

=== Nintendo Wii games ===
- Power Punch
- My Personal Golf Trainer with IMG Academies and David Leadbetter
- Aqua Panic!
- Crazy Mini Golf 2
- Bass Pro Shops: The Hunt - Trophy Showdown
- Bass Pro Shops: The Hunt
- Bass Pro Shops: The Strike - Tournament Edition
- Bass Pro Shops: The Strike
- Junior League Sports (Kidz Sports Series Compilation)
- PopStar Guitar
- Rebel Raiders: Operation Nighthawk
- Super PickUps
- Ten Pin Alley 2

=== PC games ===
- Bass Pro Shops: The Strike
- Chicago 1930
- Syberia II
- Wanted Dead or Alive
- Sanitarium
- War Chess

=== Mobile Light Force ===
In the 2000s, XS localized two unrelated Japanese shooter games to North America, rebranding them under the Mobile Light Force name. The first Mobile Light Force was a PlayStation version of Gunbird, while Mobile Light Force 2 was the PlayStation 2 version of Shikigami No Shiro. Both are very poorly regarded by fans of the genre, since XS removed many important features from the games (most notably all of their in-game plot).

XS also translated Shikigami No Shiro II, and released it for the PlayStation 2 under its own name, Castle Shikigami 2.
