= Turnabout (video game) =

2000 video game

- North American PlayStation cover art
- Developer: Artdink
- Publishers: JP: Artdink; NA: Natsume Inc.; EU: Zoo Digital Publishing
- Designer: Shinichi Senoo
- Platforms: PlayStation, browser, mobile
- Release: April 6, 2000: PlayStation; JP: April 6, 2000; NA: March 31, 2003; EU: November 7, 2003 Browser; JP: January 21, 2001 PlayStation Network; JP: December 21, 2006; NA: September 25, 2012 Mobile; JP: March 5, 2010
- Genre: Puzzle
- Mode: Single-player

Turnabout, known in Japan as Migi Hidari (U-SA) (右左 （U-SA）; literally "Right Left (U-SA)") is a puzzle video game developed by Artdink for the PlayStation. The player's objective is to rotate the stage's screen 90 degrees clockwise or counterclockwise until colored balls fall and touch other balls or stationary blocks of the same color, causing the matched objects to disappear. The round is complete when all colored objects have been removed.

Shinichi Senoo was the creator and project lead. Artdink self-published the game in Japan in 2000. It was released by Natsume Inc. in North America and distributed by Zoo Digital Publishing in Europe in 2003. The game was made available on the Japanese and North American PlayStation Network, while Japan also saw a Java-based browser version and a mobile version for iPod Touch and iPhone.

== Gameplay ==
Turnabout is a puzzle game. Each round consists of one or more stationary and non-stationary objects enclosed within a bordered stage. Gameplay involves rotating the stage 90 degrees either clockwise or counterclockwise, causing all the unfixed objects to fall downward due to gravity. The goal is to rotate the stage in order to remove certain elements. These include colored balls, which are dynamic, and colored blocks, which are stationary. When a ball collides with another ball or block of the same color, they both disappear. This repeats until the player makes all colored pieces disappear or cannot make a move, requiring the level to be restarted. There is no time limit.

The player's goal is rotate the stage until the red ball and red block touch. The colorless blocks act as obstacles.

Balls and their corresponding blocks can have five different colors: red, blue, yellow, green, and purple. Each color can only match with itself, and can touch a block of a different color without disappearing. Obstacles take the form of colorless blocks, which are dynamic pieces and, unlike balls, are not limited to taking up only one space. Colorless blocks may have very complicated and specific shapes that can obstruct ball movement. Colorless blocks can also not be matched, meaning they exist for the entire round.

Turnabout consists of 100 stock levels that become increasingly more challenging. The player can only access them in groups of ten, requiring most of the levels in a group to be completed to reach the next ten. Progress can be saved to a memory card. The game includes an Edit Mode for creating one's own puzzles. Up to 50 custom levels can be saved to the memory card slot.

== Development and release ==
Turnabout was developed for the PlayStation by Artdink. It was directed, programmed, and designed by Shinichi Senoo, who devised a number of its stages as well. He had previous credits on PlayStation such as PaRappa the Rapper, Um Jammer Lammy, Robot × Robot, and Segare Ijiri. Senoo would go on to be the main creator and project lead on the puzzle game Kowloon City. Artdink self-published Turnabout in Japan on April 6, 2000. An overseas localization was handled by Natsume Inc. in North America on March 31, 2003, and distributed by Zoo Digital Publishing in Europe late that same year. In Japan, the game was re-released for download via the PlayStation Network first on the PlayStation Portable on December 21, 2006, and then on the PlayStation 3 on May 31, 2007. It was made downloadable for both platforms in North America on September 25, 2012.

A free browser rendition of Turnabout was made available by J-Game on its Java-based, Japanese gaming website starting on January 21, 2001. A versus mode was added that let players compete against one another or the computer to solve a set of three random puzzles in the least number of steps. A mobile port of Turnabout for iPhone and iPod Touch was distributed by BB Soft Service in Japan on March 5, 2010. The app allowed the player to use either the device's gyroscope or touchscreen to rotate the puzzle field. A free "Lite" edition included three beginner puzzles, one intermediate puzzle, and one advanced puzzle. The full edition included 10 puzzles of each difficulty level with the option to purchase an additional 50 puzzles for each difficult level. The app was included in the membership for subscribers of Japan's Yahoo! Premium internet service starting on February 8, 2013.

== Reception ==
Reception

Review scores
Publication	Score
AllGame	3.5/5
Famitsu	23/40
Official U.S. PlayStation Magazine	4/5
Dengeki PlayStation	85/100
Famitsu PS	21/40

Upon release in Japan, a panel of four reviewers from Famitsu gave Turnabout a cumulative score of 23 out of 40, while the magazine's PlayStation-centric spin-off publication, Famitsu PS, scored it slightly lower at 21 out of 40. Dengeki PlayStation gave the game an overall rating of 85 out of 100. Press coverage of Turnabout was seemingly more limited in other regions. It received a favorable review from Roy Rybicki of Official U.S. PlayStation Magazine, who noted its addictive gameplay and challenge. He thought highly of its Edit Mode and soundtrack, proclaiming the latter as "sometimes jazzy, sometimes trancey" and that it "never gets too repetitive or intrusive." He felt that the game, being a budget title, lacked certain appealing features like a two-player mode and variety in its stage graphics.
