= XS Junior League Soccer =

2004 video game

- Developer: Wahoo Studios
- Publisher: XS Games
- Platform: PlayStation
- Release: September 29, 2004
- Genre: Sports
- Modes: Single-player, multiplayer

XS Junior League Soccer is a soccer simulation video game. It was released on September 29, 2004, for the PlayStation. The game was developed by Wahoo Studios, and published by XS Games. The game is part of the series XS Junior League. The game was rereleased for the PlayStation 3 as a PSOne Classic on July 9, 2009.

The player can choose from 16 characters to play as at four real world areas. Two modes of gameplay are available, Arcade and Tournament.
