= Sno-Cross Championship Racing =

2000 video game

- Developer: Unique Development Studios
- Publisher: Crave Entertainment: EU: Ubi Soft
- Platforms: PlayStation, Dreamcast
- Release: PlayStation: NA: August 9, 2000; EU: January 12, 2001; Dreamcast: NA: November 29, 2000; EU: January 19, 2001
- Genres: Racing, extreme sports
- Modes: Single-player, multiplayer

Sno-Cross Championship Racing is an extreme sports video game. It was developed by Unique Development Studios and published by Crave Entertainment.

== Gameplay ==
Sno-Cross Championship Racing is a snowmobile video game. It has seven locations to race on such as the Nagano Olympics, Aspen, and a naval ship graveyard in Murmansk. It also features a level editor that allows players to create their own race tracks.

== Development ==
The game was developed by Unique Development Studios, having previously made No Fear Downhill Mountain Biking. The snowmobiles used in the game were licensed from Yamaha and modeled using Computer-aided design data that were also used in the machines' design.

== Reception ==
Reception

Aggregate score
Aggregator	Score	
Aggregator	Dreamcast	PS
Metacritic	62/100	66/100

Review scores
Publication	Score	
Publication	Dreamcast	PS
AllGame	3/5	N/A
CNET Gamecenter	N/A	4/10
Electronic Gaming Monthly	7/10	5/10 (Note: Three critics of Electronic Gaming Monthly gave the PlayStation version each a score of 5/10.)
EP Daily	5.5/10	N/A
Game Informer	N/A	6/10
GameRevolution	B	N/A
GameSpot	6.2/10	7.2/10
GameSpy	2/10	N/A
IGN	3.1/10	7.5/10
Next Generation	3/5	N/A
Official U.S. PlayStation Magazine	N/A	1.5/5

Sno-Cross Championship Racing received "mixed or average reviews" on both platforms according to the review aggregation website Metacritic. Daniel Ericsson of Daily Radar praised the PlayStation version's track editor. Chris Charla of NextGen said of the Dreamcast version: "It's the only game of its kind on Dreamcast, and though it's not perfect, it's still a fair amount of fun."

Lamchop of GamePro said of the PlayStation version in its October 2000 issue, "Stick with Sled Storm if you want arcade action, but if you're looking for something more simlike, Sno Cross Championship Racing [sic] is worth a rental." (Note: GamePro gave the PlayStation version three 3/5 scores for graphics, control, and fun factor, and 3.5/5 for sound.) Later, Iron Thumbs called the Dreamcast version "A fun racing game that becomes more enjoyable as your skills improve, but still, it's worth renting first to see if you'll want to play it for an extended period of time." (Note: GamePro gave the Dreamcast version three 4/5 scores for graphics, sound, and fun factor, and 4.5/5 for control.)
