= Hardcore 4x4 =

1996 video game

- North American PlayStation cover art
- Developer: Gremlin Interactive
- Publishers: Gremlin Interactive (Europe); ASC Games (North America)
- Platforms: Sega Saturn, PlayStation, Microsoft Windows
- Release: PlayStation: NA: November 28, 1996; EU: December 13, 1996; Sega Saturn: NA: December 20, 1996; EU: December 1996; Windows: NA: June 15, 1998; PlayStation Network: EU: January 10, 2008
- Genre: Racing
- Modes: Single-player, multiplayer

Hardcore 4x4 (initially known as TNN Motor Sports Hardcore 4x4 in the US and known as Deka Yonku ~Tough The Truck~ (デカ４駆 ～タフ ザ トラック～) in Japan) is a racing video game developed by Gremlin Interactive for the Sega Saturn, PlayStation and Microsoft Windows. It became available for download from PlayStation Store as a PSone Classic for play on the PlayStation 3 on January 10, 2008, in PAL regions. The game utilizes 3D environments and truck models. The soundtrack features hard rock music.

== Gameplay ==
Screenshot from Hardcore 4X4

Hardcore 4x4 is an off-road racing game. The player controls a 4x4 like a Jeep or pickup truck around 3D cross-country loops and attempts to get to the finish line first. There are six different vehicles to choose from, each with differing handling, acceleration and suspension settings. Circuits have differing surfaces for the player to contend with, including tarmac, dirt, sand and ice. Weather conditions can be changed to add another challenge to the game.

There are three race types. In single race mode players participate in only one race on a track of their choice against five other competitors. In championship mode, players race through all six courses in a row in an attempt to win a Mother truck. Time trial lets up to eight players compete round-robin style for the fastest lap time around a track.

Hardcore 4x4 also includes a hidden game called Roids, an Asteroids clone, accessible with a cheat code.

== Development ==
In order to accurately model 4x4 vehicles, the developers separated the wheels off into four sections which would respond independently to the environment.

The PlayStation and Saturn versions were developed simultaneously.

== Reception ==
Reception

Review scores
Publication	Score
Computer and Video Games	3/5 (SAT & PS)
Electronic Gaming Monthly	8.25/10 (SAT)
GameFan	79.3/100 (PS) (Note: In GameFan's review, three critics scored the Playstation version differently: 78, 83, and 77.)
GamesMaster	67/100 (PS)
GameSpot	6.3/10 (PS)
IGN	4/10 (PS)
Joypad	84% (PS)
Mega Fun	64% (SAT)
Next Generation	2/5 (PS)
Play	81% (PS)
Sega Saturn Magazine	76% (SAT)

Todd Mowatt and Joe Rybicki of Electronic Gaming Monthly called the Saturn version "4x4 racing at its best" and "one of the most realistic games I've ever seen." They both praised the track design and inclusion of weather, though they felt the inability to drive off the tracks was inappropriate and frustrating. GamePro called the gameplay too slow, and additionally criticized the pixelization, lack of detail, and low frame rate. Sega Saturn Magazine's Rad Automatic was pleased with the concept, noting, "Instead of just having to take corners and go really fast, in Hardcore you have to read the track, take the lines of least resistance, avoid too-steep slopes, not fall over and not bounce around too much." However, he found fault with the execution, citing the slow gameplay, low frame rate, clipping, and lack of inertia during collisions. He concluded that the game would be entertaining for off-road enthusiasts but not general audiences, and expressed a desire to see an improved sequel.

Reviewing the PlayStation version, GamePro commented that "the basic action and squirrelly handling prevent 4x4 from building addictive gameplay. Worse, there's no real-life licenses or two-player action." The reviewer also cited breakup, redraw problems, and cheesy music. A reviewer for Next Generation said the game successfully simulates the handling of a 4x4 truck, but that the narrow tracks allow a player to easily block opponents from passing them once they get in the lead, greatly reducing the racing excitement. Like EGM's reviewers, he considered the inability to drive off the tracks inappropriate and "just plain annoying". GameSpot criticized the game's track design as having "drab colors and textures" and for being "far too narrow" and said that the lack of a map or overhead view makes the game a lot more difficult than it would have been with such a feature included. IGN said that "The trucks themselves handle very well" and "the physics of the jumps and bumps are very nice", but that the graphics are "incredibly grainy", and the narrow circuits are a problem.

The game generated £2 million in revenue.
