= Dead in the Water (video game) =

1999 racing video game

- Cover art for the game.
- Developer: Player 1
- Publisher: ASC Games
- Composer: Michelangelo D'Amico
- Platform: PlayStation
- Release: NA: February 23, 1999
- Genres: Action, racing
- Modes: Single-player, multiplayer

Dead in the Water is a boat racing game, released for the PlayStation in February 1999.

== Gameplay ==
Dead in the Water is a boat racing game. The game features nine tracks, with thirteen different characters to play.

== Development ==
The game was originally planned for release in December 1998. Dead in the Water was re-released for PSone Classics for the PlayStation 3 and PlayStation Vita.

== Reception ==
Reception

Aggregate score
| Aggregator | Score |
|---|---|
| GameRankings | 59% |

Review scores
| Publication | Score |
|---|---|
| AllGame | 3/5 |
| CNET Gamecenter | 7/10 |
| Electronic Gaming Monthly | 4.625/10 (Note: In Electronic Gaming Monthly's review of the game, one critic gave it 6/10, two of them gave it each a score of 4/10, and another gave it 4.5/10.) |
| Game Informer | 7.25/10 |
| GameSpot | 6.9/10 |
| IGN | 6.5/10 |
| Next Generation | 2/5 |
| Official U.S. PlayStation Magazine | 2.5/5 |

Previews for the game compared it to other racing games, such as Jet Moto and Twisted Metal.

Dead in the Water received "mixed" reviews according to the review aggregation website GameRankings. Next Generation said, "A decent-looking 3D polygonal game, Dead in the Water overall is a mixed bag, with the straight battle races being the ultimate lure. But in any case, steer clear of this shipwreck."
