= Dragon Beat: Legend of Pinball =

1997 video game

- Developer: Map Japan
- Publisher: Map Japan
- Platforms: PlayStation; PlayStation 3
- Release: Original Release; JP: Nov 27, 1997; Rerelease; US: May 20, 2014
- Genre: Pinball

Dragon Beat: Legend of Pinball (ドラゴンビート レジェンド オブ ピンボール) is a pinball video game playable on the PlayStation. It was released in Japan on November, 27, 1997. The game was developed and published by Map Japan. The game was rereleased for the PlayStation 3 as a "PSOne Import" in the United States on May 20, 2014. The rerelease was published by GungHo Online Entertainment. The game features three distinct tables and two different game modes.

== Gameplay ==
The game is played on three tables: Castle, Old Town, and Legend. On each of these the player needs to defeat a dragon. To reach each dragon on a table a series of challenges needs to be completed, such as rescuing damsels.

== Development ==
For the 2014 international rerelease, little localization was required, as nearly all of the important text was already in English.

== Reception ==
Super Gamepower rated the game at 4/5.
