= Monster Bass =

2000 video game

- North American box art for Monster Bass by Mick McGinty
- Developer(s): Magical Company
- Publisher(s): JP: Magical Company; NA: XS Games
- Platform(s): PlayStation; PlayStation 3 PlayStation Portable
- Release: JP: June 15, 2000; NA: December 15, 2002
- Genre(s): Fishing; Simulation
- Mode(s): Single-player

Monster Bass (known in Japan as Killer Bass) is a simulation fishing video game for the PlayStation. It was published in Japan in June 2000, and released in the United States in December 2002 by XS Games and developed by Magical Company. The game has been rereleased for the PlayStation 3, and PlayStation Portable.

The player must catch zombie fish, spiders, and other zombielike sea creatures.
