= Neo Planet =

1996 video game

- Developer(s): Map Japan
- Publisher(s): Map Japan; GungHo Online Entertainment
- Platform(s): PlayStation; PlayStation 3
- Release: Original Release; JP: Jul 5, 1996; Rerelease; JP: Nov 13, 2013; US: May 20, 2014
- Genre(s): Simulation

Neo Planet is a Japanese simulation video game for the PlayStation. The game was developed by Map Japan and published by GungHo Online Entertainment and Map Japan. It was released in Japan on July 5, 1996. The game was rereleased in Japan for the PlayStation 3 on November 13, 2013, and in the United States on May 20, 2014.

The player must create and build a new land while maintaining ecological equilibrium.
