= Backstreet Billiards =

1998 video game

- Developer: Agenda
- Publishers: JP: Argent; NA: ASCII Corporation
- Platform: PlayStation
- Release: JP: July 30, 1998; NA: November 30, 1998
- Genre: Sports
- Modes: Single-player, multiplayer

Backstreet Billiards, known in Japan as Carom Shot 2 (キャロムショット2, Kyaromu Shotto Tsū), is a video game released for PlayStation. It is the sequel to the 1997 video game Carom Shot, which was released only in Japan for PlayStation. In 2008-2009, the game was re-released for the PlayStation 3 and the PlayStation Portable, followed by the PlayStation Vita release in 2012.

== Development ==
The game was announced in May 1998.

== Reception ==
Reception

Aggregate score
Aggregator	Score
GameRankings	79%

Review scores
Publication	Score
AllGame	3/5
Electronic Gaming Monthly	6.325/10 (Note: In Electronic Gaming Monthly's review of the game, two critics gave it each a score of 6/10, one gave it 7/10, and another gave it 6.5/10.)
Famitsu	27/40
Game Informer	7.5/10
GameSpot	7.2/10
Mega Fun	73%
Official U.S. PlayStation Magazine	3.5/5

The game received favorable reviews according to the review aggregation website GameRankings. In Japan, Famitsu gave it a score of 27 out of 40. GamePro said, "Whether you're a pool shark or a guppy, Backstreet Billards has something for the pool hustler in you." (Note: GamePro gave the game two 4/5 scores for graphics and control, and two 4.5/5 scores for sound and fun factor.)
