= Championship Bass =

2000 video game

- Developers: EA Seattle; Engineering Animation
- Publisher: EA Sports
- Platforms: PlayStation, Windows
- Release: PlayStation: NA: March 7, 2000; EU: February 16, 2001; Windows: NA: March 22, 2000
- Genre: Fishing
- Modes: Single-player, multiplayer

Championship Bass is a fishing video game. It was released for PlayStation and Microsoft Windows in 2000.

== Gameplay ==
Championship Bass is a fishing video game. It offers three different modes: Bass Challenge, Fishing Trip, Tournament, and Career.

== Development ==
Championship Bass was developed by EA Seattle and Engineering Animation and published by EA Sports.

In March 2012, Championship Bass was released on the PlayStation Store for the Sony Xperia S. On August 30 the same year, the game and twenty-five other games were added to the PlayStation Vita store.

== Reception ==
Reception

Aggregate score
Aggregator	Score	
Aggregator	PC	PS
GameRankings	74%	72%

Review scores
Publication	Score	
Publication	PC	PS
AllGame	N/A	3/5
CNET Gamecenter	N/A	6/10
Computer Games Strategy Plus	3.5/5	N/A
Electronic Gaming Monthly	N/A	7.5/10
Famitsu	N/A	24/40
Game Informer	N/A	8/10
GameFan	N/A	69%
GamePro	4/5	N/A
GameSpot	6.9/10	6.1/10
GameZone	8/10	N/A
IGN	8.5/10	8/10
Official U.S. PlayStation Magazine	N/A	4/5

The game received above-average reviews on both platforms according to the review aggregation website GameRankings. In Japan, where the PlayStation version was ported and published by Electronic Arts Square on November 2, 2000, Famitsu gave it a score of 24 out of 40.
