= Yakiniku Bugyou =

- Developer: Media Entertainment
- Publisher: Media Entertainment
- Platform: PlayStation
- Release: JP: May 24, 2001
- Genre: Simulation game
- Mode: Single-player

Yakiniku Bugyou (Japanese: 焼肉奉行, Hepburn: Yakiniku Bugyō) is a simulation video game developed and published by Media Entertainment for the PlayStation. The game was re-released as a PS one Classic on December 24, 2009, on the Japanese PlayStation Network. It is a promotional tie in to the Gyu-Kaku restaurant chain, where the player must serve customers barbecue products while maintaining the customers' patience.
