= XS Airboat Racing =

- Developer: Miracle Designs
- Publisher: XS Games
- Platform: PlayStation
- Release: EU: 2003; NA: 2004
- Genre: Racing
- Mode: Single-player

XS Airboat Racing is an racing video game developed by Miracle Designs and published by XS Games exclusively for the PlayStation.
