= XS Junior League Football =

2003 video game

- Developer(s): Wahoo Studios
- Publisher(s): Original Release; XS Games; Rerelease; SCEA
- Platform(s): PlayStation; PlayStation 3
- Release: Original Release; 2003; Rerelease; Oct 11, 2011
- Genre(s): Sports

XS Junior League Football is a football video game for the PlayStation. It was released in 2003, by publisher XS Games and developer Wahoo Studios. The game was rereleased on October 11, 2011 for the PlayStation 3 by publisher SCEA.

XS Junior League Football has cartoon-style graphics with 16 different characters; each with different skills, and several scenes to play at. The player plays with a team of four other players that partake in championships and tournaments to become the football champion.
