= Putter Golf =

2001 video game

- Putter Golf Box Art
- Developer: Amedio Co.
- Publishers: JP: D3 Publisher; NA: Agetec
- Platform: PlayStation
- Release: JP: August 30, 2001; NA: October 24, 2001
- Genres: Golfing; Simulation
- Modes: Single-player, multiplayer

Putter Golf ^{JPN} is a golfing simulation video game for the PlayStation. It was published in Japan on August 30, 2001, by D3Publisher and in North America on October 24, 2001, by Agetec and developed by Amedio Co.

The player can play with three others as they play mini golf.

== Reception ==
Reception

Aggregate score
Aggregator	Score
Metacritic	30/100

Review scores
Publication	Score
Famitsu	17/40
Official U.S. PlayStation Magazine	0.5/5

Putter Golf received negative reviews according to the review aggregation website Metacritic. In Japan, Famitsu gave it a score in total of 17 out 40.

== Legacy ==
The game was later released on the PlayStation Network service for the PlayStation 3, PlayStation Portable and PlayStation Vita in Japan on June 23, 2010; and in North America on August 26, 2014.

== Notes ==
Known in Japan as Simple 1500 Series Vol. 69: The Putter Golf (SIMPLE 1500シリーズ Vol.69 THE パターゴルフ, Shinpuru Sen Go Hyaku Shiriizu Boryuumu Roku Juu Kyuu Za Pataa Gorufu)
