= Sanvein =

2000 video game

- Developer: Success
- Publishers: JP: Success; PAL: Midas Interactive Entertainment; NA: A1 Games
- Platform: PlayStation
- Release: JP: March 30, 2000; EU: September 1, 2000; AU: 2000; NA: February 28, 2001
- Genre: Shoot 'em up
- Mode: Single-player

Sanvein (ザンファイン, Zanfain), known in North America as Shooter: Starfighter Sanvein, is a top-down, multidirectional shooter developed by Success in 2000. Players can select different floors of various complexes to do battle with various enemies and bosses. Although the story is very vague, the game involves the attempt to escape from, and ultimately destroy, a giant space station called St. Schutz, a suggestively corrupted utopia; the player controls the titular Sanvein on such an attempt by battling with the station's defense mechanisms.

== Gameplay ==
The game is laid out in an arcade type format. The player's ship is modular, in that they can select a body and parts from three different types. The body determines their ship's movement and normal attack, while the latter defines their special weapon. The choices include Gluon, Photon and Graviton. The Gluon body fires attack patterns in spread-shots while Gluon parts launch a barrage of missiles, the Photon body fires concentrated shots and its parts unleashed a short-range laser blade. Finally, the Graviton body fires explosive bullets and its parts drop land mines.

The player can choose to start from one of three initial stages: Stratum, Inner Wards and Outer Wards. Clearing these three stages, regardless of starting stage, allows the player to continue into the Mines and finally the station's Core.

Each stage is composed of a number of hexagonal floors, with difficulties ranging from 1 to 4, which are also reflected by their enemy types, and boss floors, which are the only ones which must be cleared to trigger the final stage boss.

Starting at the southernmost floor, the player is tasked with navigating their way to the stage's bosses, only being allowed to select floors adjacent to each cleared floor. In each stage, however, the player's attack power is also boosted by each adjacent cleared floor.

Combat is timed. Starting with a 600-second timer (more on easier difficulties) the time starts to run down once the player enters a floor, only halting once that floor is clear. Despite this reprieve, the player only has a few seconds to select the next floor before the timer starts again regardless. Whenever the player's ship is damaged, they lose time. Seconds are earned with the destruction of each boss. This, combined with the above power boost mechanic forces the player to choose between building up power to tackle each boss, at the expense of time, or try sacrificing power in an attempt to defeat a boss quickly with diminished power. When the final stage boss is triggered, the player carries over the power level from the last boss.

When time runs out, the player has the option to continue, starting at the beginning of the stage again, but their score will be reset.

== Reception ==
Reception

Review scores
Publication	Score
Electronic Gaming Monthly	2.5/10
Famitsu	23/40
Official U.S. PlayStation Magazine	2/5
PlayStation: The Official Magazine	4/10

The game received mixed to unfavorable reviews in the United States. In Japan, Famitsu gave it a score of 23 out of 40.
