= Shooter: Space Shot =

2000 video game

- Developer: C.I.I.
- Publishers: JP: D3 Publisher; NA: Agetec
- Series: Simple
- Platform: PlayStation
- Release: JP: August 3, 2000; NA: January 1, 2001
- Genre: Scrolling shooter
- Mode: Single-player

Shooter: Space Shot, known in Japan as Simple 1500 Series 35: The Shooting (SIMPLE1500シリーズ 35 The シューティング), is a horizontally scrolling shooter. Originally released in Japan as part of the Simple series in 2000, it was released by in North America by Agetec under its A1 Games publishing label. Players can play through the game or practice their various skills in two different modes of play using only one ship.

== Plot ==
In the future, a space war is going on between a technologically advanced Empire and a fairly well advanced Republic which is in control of a task force of space-ship pilots - known as the Republic Special Forces - that are regularly sent in to destroy large enemy fortifications and mechs. Players assume the role of one of the fighters named Cyber Spears who, along with his companions, fight their missions whilst reporting the ever developing technology of their enemies.

=== Characters ===
Cyber Spears - The main character, though he's very quiet. He has a good personality as he gets along very well with others. His most distinguishing features include his long hair, mirrored shades and all-black outfit.

Nigo McFlight - The youngest of the trio, though she's the smartest of the others and an engineering prodigy. In her spare time she's making various machines that aid her team in combat.

Wells Goldman - The comic relief character, Wells is always panicking, boasting or complaining about something. Though just as skilled a fighter as the others, he suffers from various atmospheric conditions such as heat almost to the point where he completely zones out.

POSS - A little robot that Nigo recently designed, it has the ability to record enemy data and transfer it among the three ships.

Commissioner McFlight - The head of the three-man task force and obviously Nigo's father. He is responsible for organizing the team's missions.

== Gameplay ==
The player controls their space fighters with various attacks at their command:

Directional shots - Though each ship is armed with a forward firing machine gun, they also have two multi-directional cannons (called the Fang system) which can be rotated around the ship's radius so as to fire in any direction the player chooses.

Homing missiles - Using their cannon-arms, players can target multiple enemies within a short range and fire a large amount of clustered homing missiles.

Overdrive - Using the ship's energy, players can unleash a large destructive beam against enemies, but only for a few seconds before the ship's laser energy can re-charge.

Boost - Players are able to use the ship's energy for a quick burst of speed that can serve to avoid enemy fire and can also be used against small enemies as the ship can ram into them and use the discharge to destroy small craft.

A unique attribute to Space Shot is that there are no pick-up items or upgrades: all of the following are at the player's immediate disposal in unlimited quantities.
