= Destrega =

1998 video game

- European box art
- Developer: Omega Force
- Publisher: Koei: EU: Sony Computer Entertainment
- Director: Akihiro Suzuki
- Designer: Kenichi Ogasawara
- Platform: PlayStation
- Release: JP: September 23, 1998; NA: February 4, 1999; EU: October 8, 1999
- Genre: Fighting
- Modes: Single-player, multiplayer

Destrega (デストレーガ, Desutorēga) is a 1998 fighting video game developed by Omega Force and published by Koei for the PlayStation. Destrega separates itself from other games by creating a rock paper scissors type of fighting system.

== Gameplay ==
The fighting style in the game is unique in many aspects. Movement includes the ability to freely roam the current environment. The X button jumps, while R1 causes the player to dash and L1 blocks. The close range fighting system is like Rock, Paper, Scissors where each type of attack is stronger and weaker than another. The Square button results in a quick (but weak) attack; Triangle a slow and powerful one. Circle allows you to sidestep, allowing an attack by slipping behind your opponent.

After stepping far back, the charge bar changes from Red to Blue, indicating you can use magic attacks. Just like close range there are three attacks. The Fast (Bidu), Power (Est), and Span (Foh). bidu travels fast but hits weak, Est hits hard but travels slow, and if you are far away, the attack will disappear. Foh fires a multiple blast and does medium damage. Bidu beats Est, Est beats Foh, Foh beats Bidu. Bidu drains the least charge, Foh medium, and Est the most.

You can also combine magic attacks. Different combinations equal different results. There is a Level 1 attack; Bidu, Est, and Foh (3 Combinations). Then there is a Level 2 attack; Bidu Bidu, Bidu Est, Bidu Foh, Est Est, Est Foh, Foh Foh, etc. (9 Combinations). All of which can be reversed (EX: Foh Est) Then the Level 3 attack, Bidu Bidu Bidu, Bidu Bidu Est, Est Est Bidu, Foh, Bidu Foh, etc. (21 Combinations). Then there is a Level 4 attack, Bidu Est Foh (any order), (1 Combination), which does a powerful long wide attack.

The charge bar, located in the top corner of the player's screen, has 4 colors. Red, Green, Yellow, and Blue. Red means magic cannot be used (i.e. when in close-range). When yellow, you can do a level one attack. A green charge bar indicates that any level 2 attack (an attack with two attacks strung together) can be used. Blue indicates a level 3 or 4 attack is possible.

Charged attacks are also made possible. While charging (by holding Triangle, Square, or Circle) holding R1, L1, or X can do added effects. R1 does a charged run that can also deflect magic that is weaker than your current charge bar. L1 does a charge guard which blocks ALL magic until your charge bar is fully drained. You can also block level one attacks by holding L1, resulting in little damage, or press it right before contact and deflect it causing no damage. The X button does a charged jump which results in a higher jump, letting your character reach a platform that couldn't be reached by a regular jump. Or you can hit X to jump and hit Bidu, Est, Foh of any type/level and fire another different set of attacks while in the air. You can also land on your feet after being knocked into the air by tapping L1 while in the air.

Game Modes are 1P Battle (Fight CPU), Story (Fight CPUs based on the story), Versus (Fight 2P), Team Battle (Fight with up to 6 characters controlled by a human or player), Time Attack (Finish game with as little time as possible), and Endurance (Fight as many CPU people as possible. You gain health based on the speed of the battle fought).

== Plot ==
1000 years ago, the Strega appeared in the small country of Zamuel. These Strega possessed mysterious powers, and passed their knowledge to the people of Zamuel, transforming the poor country into a prosperous nation. They bestowed upon them mystical objects, known as Jeno, which would enable ordinary humans to exercise powers to their own. However, the Strega underestimated the overwhelming drive of human ambition and greed. With this new power, the people of Zamuel would invade their neighboring lands. In no time, the entire continent transformed itself into a world of destruction and death.

Through the millennium, the continent struggled to return to the golden age of prosperity it enjoyed before the Jeno War. Then one day the objects (now called Relics) were discovered in the Empire of Ipsen. After learning that these objects could allow a person to wield great power, the Emperor ordered Lord Zauber to restore them. News of the revival reached the descendants of Strega, and they pleaded with the Emperor to suppress the Relics. The Emperor responded by declaring war on the Strega. In the ensuing battle, most of the Imperial family, a great number of the high-ranking ministers, and many Strega were killed. Almost immediately, the other lords began vying for power, but the contest was a short one. Using the power of the relics, Zauber easily crushed the opposition. Having seized control, he appointed himself Prime Minister and began eliminating anyone who posed a potential threat. Fearing that the Strega would try once again to seal off the power of the Relics, Zauber began to systematically hunt down any survivors...

== Reception ==
Reception

Aggregate score
| Aggregator | Score |
|---|---|
| GameRankings | 71% |

Review scores
| Publication | Score |
|---|---|
| AllGame | 3/5 |
| Consoles + | 88% |
| Electronic Gaming Monthly | 7.75/10 (Note: Four critics of Electronic Gaming Monthly gave the game each a score of 8/10, 7.5/10, 7/10, and 8.5/10.) |
| EP Daily | 5/10 |
| Famitsu | 29/40 |
| Game Informer | 8.25/10 |
| GameSpot | 7/10 |
| IGN | 5.5/10 |
| Jeuxvideo.com | 13/20 |
| Official U.S. PlayStation Magazine | 4/5 |
| Dengeki PlayStation | 75/100, 80/100, 85/100, 75/100 |

The game received above-average reviews. Official U.S. PlayStation Magazine gave it a favorable review over a month before its U.S. release date. In Japan, Famitsu gave it a score of 29 out of 40. Boba Fatt of GamePro said in an early review, "To sum up, Destrega's sheer ambition pulls it above its weaknesses to make it one of the most unique, exciting, and challenging PlayStation fighters on the market—the story mode alone makes the game a must-play. Next time you check out a big-name fighting sequel, think back to Destrega's features and imagine what the developers could have done." (Note: GamePro gave the game two 4.5/5 scores for graphics and fun factor, 4/5 for sound, and 3.5/5 for control in an early review.)
