= Rapid Angel =

1998 video game

- Developer: Techno Soleil
- Publishers: Techno Soleil; MoneyPaw Games
- Platform: PlayStation
- Release: JP: August 13, 1998
- Genre: Beat 'em up
- Mode: Single-player

Rapid Angel (shown on the box cover and title screen as The Rapid Angel; Japanese: 快速天使) is an anime beat 'em up by Techno Soleil for the PlayStation. It was released in Japan on August 13, 1998. The player plays as three delivery girls who must manage to defeat enemies and deliver goods within a time limit.

== Plot ==
Three delivery girls named Natsumi, Ayane and Haruna work for a delivery company called "Rapid Angel".

== Gameplay ==
Rapid Angel is a side scrolling brawler. There are three selectable characters, and each of the three delivery girls has their own attack technique. The game contains a two player mode where the second player can act as a support unit for the first player.

== Reception ==
Upon its release in 1998, Famitsu magazine gave it a score of 19 out of 40. Famitsu compared the game to Final Fight, but lacking depth.

== Legacy ==
The game was re-released for the PlayStation Network in 2009, where it retailed for 600 yen. It was released for PSN imports outside of Japan in 2011. There was no localization or translation for the release, and all the audio and text was presented in Japanese.
