= List of downloadable PlayStation games (Japan) =

This is a list of PlayStation (PS1) games digitally re-released on the PlayStation Store in Japan. These are the original games software emulated. The first downloadable titles were released in Japan on November 22, 2006. Initially, downloadable PS1 titles were only available to play on PlayStation Portable (PSP). An update released in April 2007 enabled playing of these purchased PS1 titles on PlayStation 3 (PS3). Some titles can also be played on other PlayStation systems. PlayStation Vita (PSV) and PlayStation TV (PSTV) support the same PS1 titles as each other. Those released on PlayStation 4 (PS4) and PlayStation 5 (PS5) display in high-definition and may feature the addition of trophies. The PS4 and PS5 releases are bundled together, and the former is also playable on PS5 through backwards compatibility. If a downloadable PS1 game has been purchased for a device released prior to the PS4, the title is automatically added to the user's library on all devices for which there is a release.

Playing PS1 titles on a PSP or PSV does not support local multiplayer that was designed to use multiple controllers, but PSTV supports this feature.

A red cell indicates that the title is no longer available for purchase on the PlayStation Store.

There are 800 games on this list.

Title	Publisher	PSP	PS3	PSV	PS4	PS5
Arc the Lad	Sony Interactive Entertainment	November 22, 2006				
Bishi Bashi Special	Konami	November 22, 2006				
Minna no Golf 2	Sony Interactive Entertainment	November 22, 2006			January 17, 2023	January 17, 2023
Jumping Flash!	Sony Interactive Entertainment	November 22, 2006			June 2, 2022	June 2, 2022
Konami Antiques MSX Collection Vol. 1	Konami	November 22, 2006				
Konami Antiques MSX Collection Vol. 2	Konami	November 22, 2006				
Biohazard: Director's Cut	Capcom	November 22, 2006				
Silent Bomber	Bandai Namco Entertainment	November 22, 2006				
Tekken 2	Bandai Namco Entertainment	November 22, 2006			June 2, 2022	June 2, 2022
Dino Crisis	Capcom	December 21, 2006				
Global Force - Shin Sentō Kokka	Sony Interactive Entertainment	December 21, 2006				
Migi Hadari U-SA	Artdink	December 21, 2006				
Mr. Driller	Bandai Namco Entertainment	December 21, 2006			June 2, 2022	June 2, 2022
The Puppet Princess: Marl Ōkoku no Ningyō Hime	Nippon Ichi Software	December 21, 2006				
R-Types	Irem	December 21, 2006				
Taiyō no Shippo: Wild, Pure, Simple Life	Artdink	December 21, 2006				
The Conveni: Ano Machi wo Dokusen Seyo	Hamster	December 21, 2006				
TomaRunner	Sony Interactive Entertainment	December 21, 2006				
A. IV Evolution Global	Artdink	January 25, 2007				
Crash Bandicoot	Sony Interactive Entertainment	January 25, 2007				
Logic Mahjong Sōryu: 3-Player Version	Nippon Ichi Software	January 25, 2007				
Rally Cross	Sony Interactive Entertainment	January 25, 2007				
Spectral Force	Idea Factory	January 25, 2007				
Vampir: Kyūketsuki Densetsu	Artdink	January 25, 2007				
Ganbare Morikawa Kimi 2nd Pet in TV	Sony Interactive Entertainment	February 22, 2007				
Ore no Shikabane wo Koete Yuke	Sony Interactive Entertainment	February 22, 2007				
Puzzle Mania	Hamster	February 22, 2007				
R-Type Delta (no longer available)	Irem	February 22, 2007				
Shanghai Dynasty	Hamster	February 22, 2007				
The Drugstore	Hamster	February 22, 2007				
Yaku: Yūjō Dangi	Idea Factory	February 22, 2007				
Arcade Hits: Raiden	Hamster	March 29, 2007				
Galaxy Fight: Universal Warriors	Sunsoft	March 29, 2007				
Gunners Heaven	Sony Interactive Entertainment	March 29, 2007				
Hard Edge	Sunsoft	March 29, 2007				
Tall Infinity	Hamster	March 29, 2007				
A5: A Ressha de Gyōko u 5	Artdink	April 26, 2007				
CG Mukashi Banashi: Jii-san 2-do Bikkuri!!	Idea Factory	April 26, 2007				
Garō Densetsu: Wild Ambition	SNK	April 26, 2007				
Fushigi Deka	Capcom	April 26, 2007				
Ikasama Mahjong	Idea Factory	April 26, 2007				
Jigsaw World	Nippon Ichi Software	April 26, 2007				
Lunatic Dawn III	Artdink	April 26, 2007				
Metal Slug X	SNK	April 26, 2007				
Philosoma	Sony Interactive Entertainment	April 26, 2007				
Real Bout Garō Densetsu	SNK	April 26, 2007				
Kenkaku Ibunroku Yomigaerishi Sōkō no Yaiba Samurai Spirits Shinshō	SNK	April 26, 2007				
Bakumatsu Rōman: Gekka no Kenshi	SNK	April 26, 2007				
Wai Wai Tennis Plus	Hamster	April 26, 2007				
Yaku Tsū: Noroi no Game	Idea Factory	April 26, 2007				
Guilty Gear	Arc System Works	May 31, 2007				
Little Princess: Marl Ōkoku no Ningyō Hime 2	Nippon Ichi Software	May 31, 2007				
Real Bout Garō Densetsu Special: Dominated Mind	SNK	May 31, 2007				
Samurai Spirits Kenkaku Shinan Pack	SNK	May 31, 2007				
Septentrion: Out of the Blue	Hamster	May 31, 2007				
Spectral Force 2	Idea Factory	May 31, 2007				
Spectral Tower	Idea Factory	May 31, 2007				
Suna no Embrace: Eden no Sato no Never	Idea Factory	May 31, 2007				
The King of Fighters '95	SNK	May 31, 2007				
The King of Fighters '96	SNK	May 31, 2007				
The King of Fighters '97	SNK	May 31, 2007				
AI Mahjong Selection	Hamster	June 28, 2007				
Cotton Original	Hamster	June 28, 2007				
Depth	Sony Interactive Entertainment	June 28, 2007				
Gussun Paradise	Irem	June 28, 2007				
Jet Moto	Sony Interactive Entertainment	June 28, 2007			November 21, 2023	November 21, 2023
Jumping Flash! 2	Sony Interactive Entertainment	June 28, 2007				
Major Wave Series: Zipangu Jima: Unmei wa Saikoro ga Kimeru!?	Hamster	June 28, 2007				
Metal Slug	SNK	June 28, 2007				
Oasis Road	Idea Factory	June 28, 2007				
Panekit	Sony Interactive Entertainment	June 28, 2007				
Puzzle Mania 2	Hamster	June 28, 2007				
Samurai Spirits: Zankuro Musōken	SNK	June 28, 2007				
Samurai Spirits: Amakusa Kōrin Special	SNK	June 28, 2007				
Spectral Tower II	Idea Factory	June 28, 2007				
SuperLite 1500 Series Sanvein	Hamster	June 28, 2007				
The King of Fighters '98	SNK	June 28, 2007				
The King of Fighters '99	SNK	June 28, 2007				
The King of Fighters: Kyo	SNK	June 28, 2007				
XI [sai]	Sony Interactive Entertainment	June 28, 2007				
AI Shogi Selection	Hamster	July 26, 2007				
Armored Core	From Software	July 26, 2007			March 18, 2025	March 18, 2025
Bealphareth	Sony Interactive Entertainment	July 26, 2007				
Boxer's Road	Ertain	July 26, 2007				
Chippoke Ralph no Daibōken	Ertain	July 26, 2007				
Destruction Derby	Sony Interactive Entertainment	July 26, 2007				
King's Field	From Software	July 26, 2007				
Memorial Series Sunsoft Vol. 1: Ikki / Super Arabian	Sunsoft	July 26, 2007				
Robbit mon Dieu	Sony Interactive Entertainment	July 26, 2007				
SuperLite 1500 Series Chiki Chiki Chicken	Hamster	July 26, 2007				
The FamiRes: Shijō Saikyō no Menu	Hamster	July 26, 2007				
Tiny Bullets	Sony Interactive Entertainment	July 26, 2007				
Twisted Metal EX	Sony Interactive Entertainment	July 26, 2007			July 18, 2023	July 18, 2023
Wild Arms	Sony Interactive Entertainment	July 26, 2007			June 2, 2022	June 2, 2022
Saru! Get You!	Sony Interactive Entertainment	August 30, 2007			June 2, 2022	June 2, 2022
Athena: Awakening from the Ordinary Life	SNK	August 30, 2007				
Crash Bandicoot 2: Cortex Strikes Back	Sony Interactive Entertainment	August 30, 2007				
Echo Night	From Software	August 30, 2007				
Gakkō de Atta Kowai Hanashi S	Bandai Namco Entertainment	August 30, 2007				
King's Field II	From Software	August 30, 2007				
Memorial Series Sunsoft Vol. 2: Route-16 Turbo / Atlantis no Nazo	Sunsoft	August 30, 2007				
Ore no Ryōri	Sony Interactive Entertainment	August 30, 2007				
Prismaticallization	Arc System Works	August 30, 2007				
Sanyo Pachinko Paradise 5	Irem	August 30, 2007				
Shinsō Kaiten: Wanwan Umi Monogatari: Sanyo Pachinko Paradise DX	Irem	August 30, 2007				
Sonic Wings Special	Hamster	August 30, 2007				
The Conveni 2: Zenkoku Chain Tenkai da!	Hamster	August 30, 2007				
Wipeout	Sony Interactive Entertainment	August 30, 2007				
Armored Core: Project Phantasma	From Software	September 27, 2007			March 18, 2025	March 18, 2025
Azito	Hamster	September 27, 2007				
Blue Breaker: Egao no Yakusoku	Hamster	September 27, 2007				
Crash Bandicoot 3: Flying! Globe-Trotting	Sony Interactive Entertainment	September 27, 2007				
Ganbare Goemon: Uchū Kaizoku Akogingu	Konami	September 27, 2007				
Memorial Series Sunsoft Vol. 3: Madoola no Tsubasa / Tōkaidō Gojūsan Tsugi	Sunsoft	September 27, 2007				
Michinoku Hitō Koimonogatari Kai	Full On Games	September 27, 2007				
PoPoLoCrois Monogatari	Sony Interactive Entertainment	September 27, 2007				
Shadow Tower	From Software	September 27, 2007				
Alundra	Sony Interactive Entertainment	October 10, 2007				
Echo Night #2: Nemuri no Shihaisha	From Software	October 10, 2007				
Hanafuda Graffiti: Koi Koi Monogatari	Hamster	October 10, 2007				
King's Field III	From Software	October 10, 2007				
PoPoLoGue	Sony Interactive Entertainment	October 10, 2007				
Sanyo Pachinko Paradise	Irem	October 10, 2007				
Sanyo Pachinko Paradise 2	Irem	October 10, 2007				
XI [sai] Jumbo	Sony Interactive Entertainment	October 10, 2007				
Circadia	Sony Interactive Entertainment	October 24, 2007				
Crime Crackers	Sony Interactive Entertainment	October 24, 2007				
Hana to Ryū	Hamster	October 24, 2007				
Neo ATLAS	Artdink	October 24, 2007				
Tantei Jingūji Saburō: Yume no Owarini	Arc System Works	October 24, 2007				
Arc the Lad II	Sony Interactive Entertainment	November 14, 2007				
Arcade Hits: Moon Cresta	Hamster	November 14, 2007				
Blue Breaker Burst: Bishō o Anata to	Hamster	November 14, 2007				
Sanyo Pachinko Paradise 3	Irem	November 14, 2007				
Sanyo Pachinko Paradise 4	Irem	November 14, 2007				
Velldeselba Senki: Tsubasa no Kunshō	Sony Interactive Entertainment	November 14, 2007				
Armored Core: Master of Arena	From Software	November 28, 2007			March 18, 2025	March 18, 2025
Arcade Hits: Frisky Tom	Hamster	November 28, 2007				
MediEvil	Sony Interactive Entertainment	November 28, 2007				
Poitters' Point	Konami	November 28, 2007				
Seirei Hata RayBlade	Bandai Namco Entertainment	November 28, 2007				
Wild Arms: 2nd Ignition	Sony Interactive Entertainment	November 28, 2007			February 21, 2023	February 21, 2023
Arc the Lad: Monster Game with Kanji Game	Sony Interactive Entertainment	December 12, 2007				
Blue Breaker Burst -Smiling Face of Tomorrow-	Hamster	December 12, 2007				
Falcata	Gust Corporation	December 12, 2007				
Arcade Hits: Magical Drop	Hamster	December 26, 2007				
Marie no Atelier Plus: Salberg no Renkinjutsushi	Gust Corporation	December 26, 2007				
Baroque	Sting Entertainment	December 26, 2007				
Crime Crackers 2	Sony Interactive Entertainment	December 26, 2007				
I.Q.: Intelligent Qube	Sony Interactive Entertainment	December 26, 2007			June 2, 2022	June 2, 2022
PoPoLoCrois Monogatari II	Sony Interactive Entertainment	December 26, 2007				
Biohazard 2	Capcom	December 26, 2007				
Robin Roido no Bōken	Gust Corporation	December 26, 2007				
Tantei Jingūji Saburō Early Collection	Arc System Works	December 26, 2007				
Arc the Lad III	Sony Interactive Entertainment	January 16, 2008				
I.Q.: Final	Sony Interactive Entertainment	January 16, 2008				
Block Kuzushi Kowashite Help!	Hamster	January 30, 2008				
Dezaemon Plus!	Athena	January 30, 2008				
Hitomi no Noir: Cielgris Fantasm	Gust Corporation	January 30, 2008				
Pro Mahjong Kiwame Plus	Athena	January 30, 2008				
Wai Wai Kusayakyū	Hamster	January 30, 2008				
Magical Dice Kids	Sony Interactive Entertainment	February 13, 2008				
Meru Purana	Gust Corporation	February 13, 2008				
Money Idol Exchanger	Athena	February 13, 2008				
Motor Toon Grand Prix USA Edition	Sony Interactive Entertainment	February 13, 2008				
Nobunaga Hiroku: Geten no Yume	Athena	February 13, 2008				
Wai Wai Kart	Hamster	February 13, 2008				
Baroque Syndrome	Sting Entertainment	February 27, 2008				
Ide Yosuke no Mahjong Kyoshitsu	Athena	February 27, 2008				
UmJammer Lammy	Sony Interactive Entertainment	February 27, 2008				
Wai Wai Bowling	Hamster	February 27, 2008				
Addie no Okurimono: To Moze from Addie	Sony Interactive Entertainment	March 12, 2008				
Gakkō wo Tsukuro!!	Marvelous	March 12, 2008				
Kawa no Nushi Tsuri: Hikyō o Motomete	Marvelous	March 12, 2008				
Spyro the Dragon	Sony Interactive Entertainment	March 12, 2008				
Elie no Atelier: Salberg no Renkinjutsushi 2	Gust Corporation	March 21, 2008				
Crash Bandicoot Carnival	Sony Interactive Entertainment	March 21, 2008				
Dezaemon Kids!	Athena	March 21, 2008				
Master of Monsters: Akatsuki no Kenja Tatsu	SystemSoft Alpha	March 21, 2008				
Metal Gear Solid	Konami	March 21, 2008				
Pro Mahjong Kiwame Plus II	Athena	March 21, 2008				
Athena no Kateiban: Family Game	Athena	April 17, 2008				
Magical Drop F	Marvelous	April 17, 2008				
Spyro the Dragon II: Spyro X Sparx - Tondemo Tours	Sony Interactive Entertainment	April 17, 2008				
Arcade Hits: Shienryu	Hamster	April 30, 2008				
Bloody Roar	Hudson Soft	April 30, 2008				
Pro Mahjong Kiwame Tengensenhen	Athena	April 30, 2008				
Pukunpa: Joshikōki no Hōkago	Athena	April 30, 2008				
Wizard's Harmony	Arc System Works	April 30, 2008				
Docchi Mecha!	Sony Interactive Entertainment	May 14, 2008				
Nectaris	Hudson Soft	May 14, 2008				
Policenauts	Konami	May 14, 2008				
Bomberman Party Edition	Hudson Soft	May 28, 2008				
Dig-a-Dig Pukka	Sony Interactive Entertainment	May 28, 2008				
Lord Monarch	Nihon Falcom	May 28, 2008				
Wizard's Harmony 2	Arc System Works	May 28, 2008				
Acid	Hamster	June 11, 2008				
Crash Bandicoot Racing	Sony Interactive Entertainment	June 11, 2008				
Tamamayu Monogatari	Genki	June 11, 2008				
Yamasa Digi Guide: Hyper Rush	Yamasa	June 11, 2008				
Yamasa Digi Guide: M-771	Yamasa	June 11, 2008				
Yamasa Digi Guide: New Pulsar R	Yamasa	June 11, 2008				
Astronōka	Square Enix	June 25, 2008				
Einhänder	Square Enix	June 25, 2008				
Fighters' Impact	Square Enix	June 25, 2008				
Rakugaki Showtime	Square Enix	June 25, 2008				
RayStorm	Square Enix	June 25, 2008				
Xenogears	Square Enix	June 25, 2008				
Aquanaut's Holiday: Memories of Summer 1996	Artdink	July 9, 2008				
b.l.u.e. Legend of water	Hudson Soft	July 9, 2008				
Brave Fencer Musashiden	Square Enix	July 9, 2008				
Ehrgeiz	Square Enix	July 9, 2008				
RayCrisis	Square Enix	July 9, 2008				
Wizard's Harmony R	Arc System Works	July 9, 2008				
Arkanoid Returns	Square Enix	July 23, 2008				
Chocobo Stallion	Square Enix	July 23, 2008				
Dice de Chocobo	Square Enix	July 23, 2008				
Grille Logic	Shoeisha	July 23, 2008				
Yamasa Digi Selection	Yamasa	July 23, 2008				
Aquanaut's Holiday 2	Artdink	August 13, 2008				
Beltlogger 9	Genki	August 13, 2008				
Magical Date: Doki Doki Kokuhaku Dai Sakusen	Square Enix	August 13, 2008				
Project Gaiaray	Shoeisha	August 13, 2008				
Sōkaigi	Square Enix	August 13, 2008				
Blockids	Athena	August 27, 2008				
Bomberman Fantasy Race	Hudson Soft	August 27, 2008				
Carom Shot 2	Argent	August 27, 2008				
G-Darius	Square Enix	August 27, 2008				
Seirei Shōkan -Princess of Darkness-	Shoeisha	August 27, 2008				
Yamasa Digi Selection 2	Yamasa	August 27, 2008				
Dekiru! Game Center	Shoeisha	September 10, 2008				
Linda³ Again	Sony Interactive Entertainment	September 10, 2008				
Psychic Force 2	Square Enix	September 10, 2008				
Puzzle Bobble 2	Square Enix	September 10, 2008				
Bomberman Land	Hudson Soft	September 24, 2008				
Fish Eyes	Marvelous	September 24, 2008				
Kōyasai	Shoeisha	September 24, 2008				
Puchi Carat	Square Enix	September 24, 2008				
Space Invaders	Square Enix	October 15, 2008				
Tsūkai!! Slot Shooting	Shoeisha	October 15, 2008				
Front Mission Alternative	Square Enix	October 29, 2008				
Gensō no Artemis: Actress School Mystery Adventure	Shoeisha	October 29, 2008				
Ray Tracers	Square Enix	October 29, 2008				
Yamasa Digi Guide: Faust	Yamasa	October 29, 2008				
Tōkidenshō Angel Eyes	Koei Tecmo	November 12, 2008				
Building Crush!	Shoeisha	November 12, 2008				
Front Mission 1st	Square Enix	November 12, 2008				
LandMaker	Square Enix	November 12, 2008				
Bushido Blade	Square Enix	November 26, 2008				
Culdcept Expansion Plus	Media Factory	November 26, 2008				
SaGa Frontier	Square Enix	November 26, 2008				
Kokumeikan: Trap Simulation Game	Koei Tecmo	November 26, 2008				
Weltorv Estleia	Hudson Soft	November 26, 2008				
Bushido Blade 2	Square Enix	December 10, 2008				
Dead or Alive	Koei Tecmo	December 10, 2008				
Puzzle Bobble 3DX	Square Enix	December 10, 2008				
SaGa Frontier 2	Square Enix	December 10, 2008				
The Silver Case	Grasshopper Manufacture	December 10, 2008				
Brigandine: Grand Edition	Happinet	December 24, 2008				
Front Mission 2	Square Enix	December 24, 2008				
Bokujō Monogatari Harvest Moon	Marvelous	December 24, 2008			February 21, 2023	February 21, 2023
Bokujō Monogatari Harvest Moon for Girl	Marvelous	December 24, 2008				
Kagero	Koei Tecmo	December 24, 2008				
Biohazard 3: Last Escape	Capcom	December 24, 2008				
G-Police	Sony Interactive Entertainment	January 14, 2009				
Monster Farm Jump	Koei Tecmo	January 14, 2009				
Pop'n Pop	Square Enix	January 14, 2009				
Tantei Jingūji Saburō: Mikan no Rupo	Arc System Works	January 14, 2009				
Chaos Break -Episode from "Chaos Heat"-	Square Enix	January 28, 2009				
Sōmatō	Koei Tecmo	January 28, 2009				
Farland Story: Yottsu no Fūin	Entergram	January 28, 2009				
Tantei Jingūji Saburō: Tōka ga Kienu Aidani	Arc System Works	January 28, 2009				
Chocobo Racing	Square Enix	February 10, 2009				
Fish Eyes II	Marvelous	February 10, 2009				
Kula World	Sony Interactive Entertainment	February 10, 2009				
Lunar Wing	Shoeisha	February 10, 2009				
Angel Alliance	Entergram	February 25, 2009				
Fire Pro Wrestling G	Spike Chunsoft	February 25, 2009				
Gakkō wo Tsukuro!! 2	Marvelous	February 25, 2009				
Knight & Baby	Tamsoft	February 25, 2009				
Urawaza Mahjong: Korette Tenwatte Yatsukai	Spike Chunsoft	February 25, 2009				
Chō Aniki: Kyūkyoku Muteki Ginga Saikyō Otoko	Extreme Co., Ltd.	March 11, 2009				
Neo ATLAS 2	Artdink	March 11, 2009				
Yamasa Digi Guide: Umekagetsu R	Yamasa	March 11, 2009				
Advanced V.G.	Entergram	March 25, 2009				
Assault Suits Valken 2	Extreme Co., Ltd.	March 25, 2009				
Carnage Heart EZ	Artdink	March 25, 2009				
Front Mission 3	Square Enix	March 25, 2009				
Final Fantasy VII International	Square Enix	April 10, 2009				
Gakkō wo Tsukuro!! Let's Make a School	Marvelous	April 22, 2009				
Grandia	Game Arts	April 22, 2009				
Langrisser 1 & 2	Extreme Co., Ltd.	April 22, 2009				
Lunatic Dawn Odyssey	Artdink	April 22, 2009				
TILK - Aoi Umi kara Kita Shōjo	Entergram	April 22, 2009				
Arubarea no Otome	Extreme Co., Ltd.	May 13, 2009				
Final Fantasy Tactics	Square Enix	May 13, 2009				
Zeus Carnage Heart Second	Artdink	May 13, 2009				
Dream Generation: Koi Ka? Shigoto Ka!?	Extreme Co., Ltd.	May 27, 2009				
Himitsu Sentai Metamor V DX	Mycom	May 27, 2009				
Mahōtsukai ni Naru Hōhō	Entergram	May 27, 2009				
Zeus II Carnage Heart	Artdink	June 10, 2009				
Farland Saga: Toki no Michishirube	Entergram	June 24, 2009				
Final Fantasy	Square Enix	June 24, 2009				
Final Fantasy II	Square Enix	July 8, 2009				
GaiaSeed: Project Seed Trap	Hamster	July 8, 2009				
Deroon Dero Dero	Koei Tecmo	July 8, 2009				
Tall Twins Tower	Hamster	July 22, 2009				
Arcade Hits: Outlaws Of The Lost Dynasty	Marvelous	August 12, 2009				
Rapid Racer	Sony Interactive Entertainment	August 12, 2009				
Rockman	Capcom	August 12, 2009				
Saikyō Tōdai Shogi	Extreme Co., Ltd.	August 12, 2009				
Vagrant Story	Square Enix	August 12, 2009				
Dragon Knights Glorious	Shannon	August 26, 2009				
Honkaku Pro Maajan Tetsuman Special	Kaga Create	August 26, 2009				
Shisha no Yobu Tachi	Shannon	August 26, 2009				
The Rapid Angel	Hamster	August 26, 2009				
Rockman 2: Dr. Wily no Nazo	Capcom	September 9, 2009				
Side Pocket 3	Marvelous	September 9, 2009				
1 on 1	Jorudan	September 24, 2009				
Final Fantasy VIII	Square Enix	September 24, 2009				
Nippon Pro Mahjong Renmei Kōnin: Dōjō Yaburi	Kaga Create	September 24, 2009				
Rubbish Blazon	Shannon	September 24, 2009				
Theme Aquarium	Electronic Arts	September 24, 2009				
Theme Park	Electronic Arts	September 24, 2009				
Vanguard Bandits	Hamster	September 24, 2009				
Catch! Kimochi Sensation	Shannon	October 14, 2009				
Mikagura Shōjo Tanteidan	Hamster	October 14, 2009				
Populous: The Beginning	Electronic Arts	October 14, 2009				
Gochachiru	Shannon	October 28, 2009				
Lucifer Ring	Hamster	October 28, 2009				
Nippon Pro Mahjong Renmei Kōnin: Shin Tetsuman	Kaga Create	October 28, 2009				
Theme Hospital	Electronic Arts	October 28, 2009				
Neko Zamurai	Hamster	November 11, 2009				
Oni Zero - Fukkatsu	Shannon	November 11, 2009				
Soviet Strike	Electronic Arts	November 11, 2009				
Tokimeki Memorial: Forever with You	Konami	November 11, 2009				
Hi-Octane	Electronic Arts	November 25, 2009				
Langrisser 4 & 5 Final Edition	Extreme Co., Ltd.	November 25, 2009				
Tehodoki Mahjong	Kaga Create	November 25, 2009				
Tokimeki Memorial 2	Konami	November 25, 2009				
Tokimeki Memorial 2 EVS Append Disc	Konami	November 25, 2009				
Zoku Mikagura Shōjo Tanteidan ~Kanketsuhen~	Hamster	November 25, 2009				
Gourmet Action Game: Manpuku!! Nabe Kazoku	Hamster	December 9, 2009				
Magical Drop III	Marvelous	December 9, 2009				
Magic Carpet	Electronic Arts	December 9, 2009				
Black Matrix +	GungHo Online Entertainment	December 24, 2009				
Motteke Tamago with Ganbare! Kamonohashi	Kaga Create	December 24, 2009				
NOëL NOT DiGITAL	Hamster	December 24, 2009				
Theme Park World	Electronic Arts	December 24, 2009				
Yakiniku Bugyō	Hamster	December 24, 2009				
Championship Bass	Electronic Arts	January 13, 2010				
Hyper Crazy Climber	Hamster	January 13, 2010				
Kyujin	Hamster	January 13, 2010				
Tokimeki Memorial Taisen Puzzle-Dama	Konami	January 13, 2010				
Kakuge-Yaro: Fighting Game Creator	Hamster	January 27, 2010				
Nippon Pro Mahjong Renmei Kōnin: Dōjō Yaburi 2	Kaga Create	January 27, 2010				
Tokimeki Memorial 2 Puzzle-Dama	Konami	January 27, 2010				
Yakitori Musume: Sugōde Hanjōki	Hamster	January 27, 2010				
Black Matrix 00	GungHo Online Entertainment	February 10, 2010				
Chess Family	Hamster	February 10, 2010				
Sentimental Graffiti	GungHo Online Entertainment	February 10, 2010				
Deadheat Road	Hamster	February 24, 2010				
Family Diamond	Hamster	February 24, 2010				
The Pro Mahjong: Menkyo Minnaten	Kaga Create	February 24, 2010				
Thunder Force V: Perfect System	Sega	February 24, 2010				
Tokimeki After Class: Let's Quiz	Konami	February 24, 2010				
Family Gunjin Shogi	Hamster	March 10, 2010				
Neorude	Sega	March 10, 2010				
Puppet Zoo Pilomy	Hamster	March 10, 2010				
Simple 1500 Series Vol. 14: The Block Kuzushi	D3 Publisher	March 10, 2010				
Simple 1500 Series Vol. 15: The Pachinko	D3 Publisher	March 10, 2010				
Simple 1500 Series Vol. 18: The Bowling	D3 Publisher	March 10, 2010				
Simple 1500 Series Vol. 31: The Sound Novel	D3 Publisher	March 10, 2010				
Ganso Family Mahjong	Hamster	March 24, 2010				
My Garden	Sega	March 24, 2010				
Simple 1500 Series Vol. 32: The Boxing	D3 Publisher	March 24, 2010				
Simple 1500 Series Vol. 35: The Shooting	D3 Publisher	March 24, 2010				
Simple 1500 Series Vol. 37: The Illust Puzzle & Slide Puzzle	D3 Publisher	March 24, 2010				
Simple 1500 Series Vol. 43: The Hanafuda 2	D3 Publisher	March 24, 2010				
Uchū Gōshōden: Bakuretsu Akindo	Hamster	March 24, 2010				
Arcade Hits: Wolf Fang	Marvelous	April 14, 2010				
Hamster Club i	Jorudan	April 14, 2010				
Hashiriya: Ookamitachi no Densetsu	Hamster	April 14, 2010				
Hoshi no Maboroshi	Jorudan	April 14, 2010				
Kowloon's Gate	Artdink	April 14, 2010				
Kyūtenkai: Fantastic Pinball	Sega	April 14, 2010				
Simple 1500 Series Vol. 28: The Dungeon RPG	D3 Publisher	April 14, 2010				
Simple 1500 Series Vol. 33: The Takkyū	D3 Publisher	April 14, 2010				
Simple 1500 Series Vol. 39: The Mahjong 2	D3 Publisher	April 14, 2010				
Simple 1500 Series Vol. 40: The Shogi 2	D3 Publisher	April 14, 2010				
Zero Divide	Zoom	April 14, 2010				
Ground Stroke: Advanced Tennis Game	Hamster	April 28, 2010				
Kisō Jidaigeki Sugoroku: Shinobi no Roku	Hamster	April 28, 2010				
Neorude 2	Sega	April 28, 2010				
Rockman 3: Dr. Wily no Saigo!?	Capcom	April 28, 2010				
Simple 1500 Series Vol. 36: The Renai Simulation	D3 Publisher	April 28, 2010				
Simple 1500 Series Vol. 41: The Reversi 2	D3 Publisher	April 28, 2010				
Simple 1500 Series Vol. 44: The Card 2	D3 Publisher	April 28, 2010				
Simple 1500 Series Vol. 45: The Block Kuzushi 2	D3 Publisher	April 28, 2010				
DonPachi	CAVE	May 12, 2010				
Kōtetsu Reiiki Steeldom	Sega	May 12, 2010				
Sekai Saikyō Ginsei Igo 3	Hamster	May 12, 2010				
Simple 1500 Series Vol. 48: The Puzzle 2	D3 Publisher	May 12, 2010				
Simple 1500 Series Vol. 49: The Casino	D3 Publisher	May 12, 2010				
Simple 1500 Series Vol. 53: The Helicopter	D3 Publisher	May 12, 2010				
Simple 1500 Series Vol. 55: The Darts	D3 Publisher	May 12, 2010				
Zero Divide 2	Zoom	May 12, 2010				
Final Fantasy IX	Square Enix	May 20, 2010				
DoDonPachi	CAVE	May 26, 2010				
Jet Copter X	Hamster	May 26, 2010				
Kaze no Oka Kōen ni te	Sega	May 26, 2010				
Simple 1500 Series Vol. 56: The Sniper	D3 Publisher	May 26, 2010				
Simple 1500 Series Vol. 57: The Meiro	D3 Publisher	May 26, 2010				
Simple 1500 Series Vol. 59: The Suiri	D3 Publisher	May 26, 2010				
Simple 1500 Series Vol. 60: The Table Hockey	D3 Publisher	May 26, 2010				
Hi Hō Ō	Hamster	June 9, 2010				
Neorude: Kizamareta Monshō	Sega	June 9, 2010				
Simple 1500 Series Vol. 63: The Gun Shooting 2	D3 Publisher	June 9, 2010				
Simple 1500 Series Vol. 64: The Kickboxing	D3 Publisher	June 9, 2010				
Simple 1500 Series Vol. 65: The Golf	D3 Publisher	June 9, 2010				
Simple 1500 Series Vol. 70: The War Simulation	D3 Publisher	June 9, 2010				
The Firemen 2: Pete & Danny	Hamster	June 9, 2010				
Dew Prism	Square Enix	June 23, 2010				
NOëL: La Neige	Hamster	June 23, 2010				
Reverthion	Sega	June 23, 2010				
Simple 1500 Series Vol. 69: The Putter Golf	D3 Publisher	June 23, 2010				
Simple 1500 Series Vol. 71: The Renai Simulation 2	D3 Publisher	June 23, 2010				
Simple 1500 Series Vol. 72: The Beach Volley	D3 Publisher	June 23, 2010				
Simple 1500 Series Vol. 74: The Horror Mystery	D3 Publisher	June 23, 2010				
Zig Zag Ball	Hamster	June 23, 2010				
Kumitate Battle: Kuttu Ketto	Sega	July 14, 2010				
Maboroshi Tsukiyo: Tsukiyono Kitan	Kaga Create	July 14, 2010				
Mahjong Yōchien: Tamago Gumi	GungHo Online Entertainment	July 14, 2010				
Makeruna! Makendō 2	GungHo Online Entertainment	July 14, 2010				
Minna Atsumare! Igo Kyōshitsu	Hamster	July 14, 2010				
NOëL: La Neige (Special Edition)	Hamster	July 14, 2010				
Shin Megami Tensei	Atlus	July 14, 2010				
Simple 1500 Series Vol. 78: The Zero Yon	D3 Publisher	July 14, 2010				
Simple 1500 Series Vol. 82: The Sensuikan	D3 Publisher	July 14, 2010				
Simple 1500 Series Vol. 85: The Sengoku Bushō: Tenka Tōitsu no Yabō	D3 Publisher	July 14, 2010				
Simple 1500 Series Vol. 86: The Onigokko	D3 Publisher	July 14, 2010				
Elan	Hamster	July 28, 2010				
Seiken Densetsu: Legend of Mana	Square Enix	July 28, 2010				
Omise de Tensyu	Sega	July 28, 2010				
Simple 1500 Series Vol. 87: The Kyōtei	D3 Publisher	July 28, 2010				
Simple 1500 Series Vol. 88: The Gal Mahjong	D3 Publisher	July 28, 2010				
Simple 1500 Series Vol. 90: The Sensha	D3 Publisher	July 28, 2010				
Simple 1500 Series Vol. 91: The Gambler ~Honoo no Tobaku Densetsu~	D3 Publisher	July 28, 2010				
Sōgaku Toshi Osaka	GungHo Online Entertainment	July 28, 2010				
SuperLite 1500 Series Battle Sugoroku: Hunter	Hamster	July 28, 2010				
SuperLite 1500 Series Card II	Hamster	July 28, 2010				
SuperLite 1500 Series Oekaki Puzzle	Hamster	July 28, 2010				
Ungra Walker	Hamster	July 28, 2010				
Zanac X Zanac	GungHo Online Entertainment	July 28, 2010				
Anokodokonoko	Hamster	August 11, 2010				
0 Kara no Shogi: Shogi Yōchien - Ayumi Kumi	GungHo Online Entertainment	August 11, 2010				
Dokapon! Ikari no Tetsuken	Asmik Ace Entertainment	August 11, 2010				
Love Game's: Wai Wai Tennis	Hamster	August 11, 2010				
LSD	Asmik Ace Entertainment	August 11, 2010				
Marionette Company	GungHo Online Entertainment	August 11, 2010				
Shin Megami Tensei II	Atlus	August 11, 2010				
Simple 1500 Series Vol. 95: The Hikōki	D3 Publisher	August 11, 2010				
Simple 1500 Series Vol. 97: The Squash	D3 Publisher	August 11, 2010				
Simple 1500 Series Vol. 98: The Futsal	D3 Publisher	August 11, 2010				
Simple 1500 Series Vol. 99: The Kendo	D3 Publisher	August 11, 2010				
SuperLite 1500 Series Bomb Boat	Hamster	August 11, 2010				
SuperLite 1500 Series Hooockey!!	Hamster	August 11, 2010				
SuperLite 1500 Series Oekaki Puzzle 2	Hamster	August 11, 2010				
Akagawa Jirō: Yasōkyoku	Marvelous	August 25, 2010				
Chocobo no Fushigi na Dungeon	Square Enix	August 25, 2010				
Evergreen Avenue	GungHo Online Entertainment	August 25, 2010				
NOëL3 MISSION ON THE LINE	Hamster	August 25, 2010				
Rung Rung: Oz no Mahō Tsukai - Another World	GungHo Online Entertainment	August 25, 2010				
Silhouette Mirage	Treasure	August 25, 2010				
Simple 1500 Series Vol. 100: The Uchūhikōshi	D3 Publisher	August 25, 2010				
Simple 1500 Series Vol. 101: The Sentō	D3 Publisher	August 25, 2010				
SuperLite 1500 Series Pangaea	Hamster	August 25, 2010				
SuperLite 1500 Series Quiz Master Red	Hamster	August 25, 2010				
SuperLite 1500 Series The Curling	Hamster	August 25, 2010				
Akagawa Jirō: Yasōkyoku 2	Marvelous	September 8, 2010				
Mahjong Yōchien: Tamago Gumi 2	GungHo Online Entertainment	September 8, 2010				
Shin Megami Tensei if...	Atlus	September 8, 2010				
SuperLite 1500 Series Angolmois '99	Hamster	September 8, 2010				
SuperLite 1500 Series Endless Season: Anokodokonoko	Hamster	September 8, 2010				
SuperLite 1500 Series Quiz Master Blue	Hamster	September 8, 2010				
Battle Athletess: Daiundōkai Alternative	Hamster	September 22, 2010				
Gunparade March	Sony Interactive Entertainment	September 22, 2010				
Lup*Salad	GungHo Online Entertainment	September 22, 2010				
SuperLite 1500 Series Oekaki Puzzle 3	Hamster	September 22, 2010				
SuperLite 1500 Series Pinball Golden Logres	Hamster	September 22, 2010				
Dragon Money	GungHo Online Entertainment	October 13, 2010				
Memorial Series Sunsoft Vol. 4: Chō Wakusei Senki Metafight / Lipple Island	Sunsoft	October 13, 2010				
Noon	GungHo Online Entertainment	October 13, 2010				
Saikyō Ginsei Mahjong	Hamster	October 13, 2010				
Salaryman Champ: Tatakau Salaryman	Hamster	October 13, 2010				
Shin Megami Tensei: Devil Children	Atlus	October 13, 2010				
SuperLite 1500 Series Quiz Master Yellow	Hamster	October 13, 2010				
Chocobo no Fushigi na Dungeon 2	Square Enix	October 27, 2010				
Favorite Dear: Enkan no Monogatari	GungHo Online Entertainment	October 27, 2010				
Irem Arcade Classics	Irem	October 27, 2010				
Marionette Company 2	GungHo Online Entertainment	October 27, 2010				
Saikyō Ginsei Chess	Hamster	October 27, 2010				
SuperLite 1500 Series Oekaki Puzzle 4	Hamster	October 27, 2010				
Umi no Nushi Tsuri: Takarajima ni Mukatte	Marvelous	October 27, 2010				
Waku Waku Volley	Athena	October 27, 2010				
Parasite Eve	Square Enix	November 4, 2010				
Battle Athletess: Daiundōkai GTO	Hamster	November 10, 2010				
Cotton 100%	Hamster	November 10, 2010				
Nobunaga no Yabō: Zenkokuban	Koei Tecmo	November 10, 2010				
Saikyō Ginsei Shogi 2	Hamster	November 10, 2010				
SuperLite 1500 Series Oekaki Puzzle 5	Hamster	November 10, 2010				
Touge MAX: Saisoku Drift Master	Atlus	November 10, 2010				
Parasite Eve II	Square Enix	November 18, 2010				
Elan Plus	Hamster	November 24, 2010				
Favorite Dear: Junshiro no Yogenmono	GungHo Online Entertainment	November 24, 2010				
Finger Flashing	GungHo Online Entertainment	November 24, 2010				
Memorial Series Sunsoft Vol. 5: RAF World / Hebereke	Sunsoft	November 24, 2010				
SuperLite 1500 Series Hanafuda II	Hamster	November 24, 2010				
Touge MAX 2	Atlus	November 24, 2010				
Umi no Oh! Yah!	Marvelous	November 24, 2010				
Asuka 120% Special: Burning Fest Special	Family Soft	December 8, 2010				
Koten Tsugoshū: Shijin no Kan	Hamster	December 8, 2010				
Kō-2→Shogun	Hamster	December 8, 2010				
Le Concert ff (fortissimo)	GungHo Online Entertainment	December 8, 2010				
Le Concert pp (pianissimo)	GungHo Online Entertainment	December 8, 2010				
My Home Dream	Marvelous	December 8, 2010				
Akumajō Dracula X: Gekka no Yasōkyoku	Konami	December 16, 2010				
Akagawa Jirō: Majotachi no Nemuri: Fukkatsusai	Marvelous	December 22, 2010				
Art Camion Sugorokuden	GungHo Online Entertainment	December 22, 2010				
Digital Glider Airman	Hamster	December 22, 2010				
Gotatsujin: Electro	Hamster	December 22, 2010				
Mahjong Uranai Fortuna: Tsuki no Megami-tachi	GungHo Online Entertainment	December 22, 2010				
Metamoru Panic: Doki Doki Yōma Busters!!	Family Soft	December 22, 2010				
Memorial Series Sunsoft Vol. 6: Battle Formula / Gimmick!	Sunsoft	December 22, 2010				
The Legend of Dragoon	Sony Interactive Entertainment	December 22, 2010			February 21, 2023	February 21, 2023
Yamasa Digi World: Tetra Master	Yamasa	December 22, 2010				
Hanabi Fantast	GungHo Online Entertainment	January 12, 2011				
Mad Stalker: Full Metal Force	Family Soft	January 12, 2011				
Mr. Prospector: Horiate-kun	Hamster	January 12, 2011				
Space Griffon VF-9	Interlex	January 12, 2011				
Uki Uki Tsuri Tengoku: Ningyo Densetsu no Nazo	Hamster	January 12, 2011				
Dai-2-Ji Super Robot Taisen	Bandai Namco Entertainment	January 26, 2011				
Dai-3-Ji Super Robot Taisen	Bandai Namco Entertainment	January 26, 2011				
Dōkyu Re-Mix: Billiards Multiple	Hamster	January 26, 2011				
Hatsukoi Valentine	Family Soft	January 26, 2011				
PET PET PET	GungHo Online Entertainment	January 26, 2011				
Suizokukan Project: Fish Hunter e no Michi	Hamster	January 26, 2011				
Super Robot Taisen EX	Bandai Namco Entertainment	January 26, 2011				
Asuka 120% Special: Burning Fest Special Excellent	Family Soft	February 9, 2011				
Cyberbots: Full Metal Madness	Capcom	February 9, 2011				
Vampire Savior: EX Edition	Capcom	February 9, 2011				
First Queen IV	GungHo Online Entertainment	February 9, 2011				
Rockman 4: Arata Naru Yabō!!	Capcom	February 9, 2011				
Star Gladiator Episode I: Final Crusade	Capcom	February 9, 2011				
Uki Uki Tsuri Tengoku: Kawa Monogatari	Hamster	February 9, 2011				
Hatsukoi Valentine Special	Family Soft	February 23, 2011				
Killer Bass	GungHo Online Entertainment	February 23, 2011				
Kitchen Panic	Interlex	February 23, 2011				
Ooedo Feng Shui Ingaritsu: Hanabi 2	GungHo Online Entertainment	February 23, 2011				
Overblood	Althi	February 23, 2011				
SuperLite 3in1 Series Quiz Shū	Hamster	February 23, 2011				
Uki Uki Tsuri Tengoku: Uokami Densetsu o Oe	Hamster	February 23, 2011				
Community POM: Omoide o Dakishimete	Family Soft	March 9, 2011				
Pro Wrestling Sengokuden: Hyper Tag Match	GungHo Online Entertainment	March 9, 2011				
Rescue 24 Hours	GungHo Online Entertainment	March 9, 2011				
U.P.P.	Interlex	March 9, 2011				
Deserted Island	GungHo Online Entertainment	March 25, 2011				
Fūraiki	Full On Games	March 25, 2011				
Kōshien V	GungHo Online Entertainment	March 25, 2011				
Paca Paca Passion	Kemco	March 25, 2011				
SuperLite 3in1 Series Oekaki Puzzle Shū	Hamster	March 25, 2011				
Wakusei Kōkitai Little Cats	Family Soft	March 25, 2011				
Final Fantasy V	Square Enix	April 6, 2011				
Asuka 120% Special: Burning Fest. Final	Family Soft	April 13, 2011				
Bounty Sword First	Hamster	April 13, 2011				
Dino Crisis 2	Capcom	April 13, 2011				
Gōketuji Ichizoku 2: Chottodake Saikyō Densetsu	Atlus	April 13, 2011				
Max Surfing 2000	GungHo Online Entertainment	April 13, 2011				
Paca Paca Passion 2	Kemco	April 13, 2011				
Pocket Fighter	Capcom	April 13, 2011				
Vehicle Cavalier	GungHo Online Entertainment	April 13, 2011				
Final Fantasy VI	Square Enix	April 20, 2011				
Aero Dive	Bandai Namco Entertainment	July 6, 2011				
Bounty Sword: Double Edge	Hamster	July 6, 2011				
Breath of Fire IV	Capcom	July 6, 2011				
Chrono Cross	Square Enix	July 6, 2011				
Dai-4-Ji Super Robot Taisen S	Bandai Namco Entertainment	July 6, 2011				
Dioramos	Hamster	July 6, 2011				
Doki Oki	Bandai Namco Entertainment	July 6, 2011				
Goiken Muyō II	GungHo Online Entertainment	July 6, 2011				
Hyōryūki: The Reportage Beyond the Sea	GungHo Online Entertainment	July 6, 2011				
Kid Klown no Crazy Chase 2: Love Love Honey Sōdatsusen	Kemco	July 6, 2011				
Kaze no Klonoa	Bandai Namco Entertainment	July 6, 2011				
Marl Jong!!	Nippon Ichi Software	July 6, 2011				
Nyan to Wonderful	Bandai Namco Entertainment	July 6, 2011				
Ochanoma Battle	Hamster	July 6, 2011				
Paca Paca Passion Special	Kemco	July 6, 2011				
Panzer Bandit	Bandai Namco Entertainment	July 6, 2011				
Pocket Tuner	Althi	July 6, 2011				
R4: Ridge Racer Type 4	Bandai Namco Entertainment	July 6, 2011			March 21, 2023	March 21, 2023
Ryūki Denshō: Dragoon	GungHo Online Entertainment	July 6, 2011				
Sengoku Mugen	Bandai Namco Entertainment	July 6, 2011				
Shin Super Robot Taisen	Bandai Namco Entertainment	July 6, 2011				
Slap Happy Rhythm Busters	Polygon Magic	July 6, 2011				
Tekken	Bandai Namco Entertainment	July 6, 2011				
The Bombing Islands: Kid Klown no Krazy Puzzle	Kemco	July 6, 2011				
The Onitaiji!!: Mezase! Nidaime Momotarō	Nippon Ichi Software	July 6, 2011				
Ore! Tomba	GungHo Online Entertainment	July 6, 2011				
Twins Story: Kimi ni Tsutaetakute	Interlex	July 6, 2011				
Wai Wai 3-nin Uchi Mahjong	Hamster	July 6, 2011				
Wai Wai Trump Taisen	Hamster	July 6, 2011				
Zoku Gussun Oyoyo	Irem	July 6, 2011				
Jigsaw Island: Japan Graffiti	Nippon Ichi Software	July 13, 2011				
Toys Dream	GungHo Online Entertainment	July 13, 2011				
Waku Waku Derby	GungHo Online Entertainment	July 13, 2011				
Winning Lure	Hamster	July 13, 2011				
Dangan	GungHo Online Entertainment	July 27, 2011				
Marby Baby Story	Hamster	July 27, 2011				
Pro Wrestling Sengokuden 2	GungHo Online Entertainment	July 27, 2011				
Quiz Nanairo Dreams: Nijiiro Machi no Kiseki	Capcom	July 27, 2011				
Chiisa na Ōkoku Eltria	GungHo Online Entertainment	August 10, 2011				
Doki Doki Shutter Chance	Nippon Ichi Software	August 10, 2011				
Double Dragon	Arc System Works	August 10, 2011				
Rockman 5: Blues no Wana!?	Capcom	August 10, 2011				
Strikers 1945 II	GungHo Online Entertainment	August 10, 2011				
'99 Kōshien	GungHo Online Entertainment	August 24, 2011				
Dosukoi Densetsu	GungHo Online Entertainment	August 24, 2011				
Geom Cube	Arc System Works	August 24, 2011				
Sound Novel Evolution 2: Kamaitachi no Yoru: Tokubetsu-Hen	Spike Chunsoft	August 24, 2011				
Chōjin Gakuen Gowcaizer	Hamster	September 14, 2011				
Max Surfing 2nd	GungHo Online Entertainment	September 14, 2011				
Nightmare Creatures	Sony Interactive Entertainment	September 14, 2011				
Sound Novel Evolution 1: Otogirisō Sosei-Hen	Spike Chunsoft	September 14, 2011				
Buster Bros. Collection	Capcom	September 28, 2011				
Chrono Trigger	Square Enix	September 28, 2011				
Fire Panic	Sony Interactive Entertainment	September 28, 2011				
Tomba: The Wild Adventures	GungHo Online Entertainment	September 28, 2011				
Kuro no Ken: Blade of the Darkness	Interlex	October 12, 2011				
Rebus	Atlus	October 12, 2011				
Street Boarders 2	GungHo Online Entertainment	October 12, 2011				
Cool Boarders	Studio Zan	October 26, 2011				
Dungeon Shōtenkai: Densetsu no Ken Hajimemashita	GungHo Online Entertainment	October 26, 2011				
Tenchi o Kurau II: Sekiheki no Tatakai	Capcom	October 26, 2011				
Clock Tower ～The First Fear～	Sunsoft	November 9, 2011				
Super Robot Taisen F	Bandai Namco Entertainment	November 9, 2011				
Super Robot Taisen F Kanketsuhen	Bandai Namco Entertainment	November 9, 2011				
Blaster Master: Blasting Again	Sunsoft	November 23, 2011				
Cool Boarders 2: Killing Session	Studio Zan	November 23, 2011				
Final Round	Atlus	December 7, 2011				
The Shanghai	Sunsoft	December 7, 2011				
Rising Zan: The Samurai Gunman	Studio Zan	December 21, 2011				
Super Robot Taisen Alpha	Bandai Namco Entertainment	December 21, 2011				
Super Robot Taisen Alpha Gaiden	Bandai Namco Entertainment	December 21, 2011				
Dragonseeds: Shinka Keitai	City Connection	January 18, 2012				
Gaia Master	Capcom	January 18, 2012				
Slam Dragon	City Connection	January 18, 2012				
Kururin Pa!	Sky Think Systems	February 8, 2012				
Myst	Cyan Worlds	February 8, 2012				
Action Bass	GungHo Online Entertainment	February 22, 2012				
Clock Tower 2	Sunsoft	February 22, 2012				
Harmful Park	Sky Think Systems	February 22, 2012				
Shiritsu Justice Gakuen: Legion of Heroes	Capcom	February 22, 2012				
Kotobuki Grand Prix	GungHo Online Entertainment	March 14, 2012				
Shingata Kururin Pa!	Sky Think Systems	March 14, 2012				
Trump Shiyōyo! (Reprint)	GungHo Online Entertainment	March 14, 2012				
Boku wa Kōkū Kanseikan	GungHo Online Entertainment	March 28, 2012				
Pipe Dreams 3D	GungHo Online Entertainment	March 28, 2012				
T: Kara Hajimaru Monogatari	City Connection	March 28, 2012				
Tokyo Majin Gakuen Gehōchō	Asmik Ace Entertainment	March 28, 2012				
Tokyo Majin Gakuen: Kenpūchō	Asmik Ace Entertainment	March 28, 2012				
Tokyo Majin Gakuen Oboro-Kitan	Asmik Ace Entertainment	March 28, 2012				
Rayman	Ubisoft	April 11, 2012				
The Bistro	GungHo Online Entertainment	April 11, 2012				
Vigilante 8	Activision	April 11, 2012				
Sheep	GungHo Online Entertainment	April 25, 2012				
Speedball 2100	The Bitmap Brothers	April 25, 2012				
Clock Tower: Ghost Head	Sunsoft	May 9, 2012				
Motto Trump Shiyōyo! i-Mode de Grand Prix	GungHo Online Entertainment	May 9, 2012				
Tyco RC: Assault With a Battery	GungHo Online Entertainment	May 9, 2012				
Pachi-Slot Kanzen Kōryaku: Takasago Super Project	GungHo Online Entertainment	June 13, 2012				
Pachi-Slot Kanzen Kōryaku: Takasago Super Project 2	GungHo Online Entertainment	June 13, 2012				
Final Fantasy IV	Square Enix	June 27, 2012				
Summon Night	Bandai Namco Entertainment	July 20, 2012				
Pachi-Slot Kanzen Kōryaku: Universal Kōshiki Gaido Volume 4	GungHo Online Entertainment	August 29, 2012				
Pachi-Slot Kanzen Kōryaku 1: Universal Kōshiki Gaido Volume 1	GungHo Online Entertainment	August 29, 2012				
Pachi-Slot Kanzen Kōryaku 3: Universal Kōshiki Gaido Volume 3	GungHo Online Entertainment	August 29, 2012				
Summon Night 2	Bandai Namco Entertainment	August 29, 2012				
Big Bass World Championship	Starfish	September 26, 2012				
Umihara Kawase Shun: Second Edition	Studio Saizensen	September 26, 2012				
AirAssault	Sony Interactive Entertainment	November 28, 2012				
Rockman 6: Shijō Saidai no Tatakai!!	Capcom	February 27, 2013				
The Match Golf	Starfish	April 24, 2013				
Cyber Sled	Bandai Namco Entertainment	June 26, 2013				
Mr. Driller G	Bandai Namco Entertainment	June 26, 2013				
Pac-Man World	Bandai Namco Entertainment	June 26, 2013				
Smash Court	Bandai Namco Entertainment	June 26, 2013				
Xevious 3D/G+	Bandai Namco Entertainment	June 26, 2013				
Metal Gear Solid: Integral	Konami	July 11, 2013				
Zutto Issho: With Me Everytime...	Hamster	September 11, 2013				
EOS: Edge of Skyhigh	GungHo Online Entertainment	September 25, 2013				
Sosora no Tsubasa: Gotha World	GungHo Online Entertainment	September 25, 2013				
Dragon Beat: Legend of Pinball	GungHo Online Entertainment	November 13, 2013				
Neo Planet	GungHo Online Entertainment	November 13, 2013				
Abe '99	Oddworld Inhabitants	November 13, 2013			December 20, 2022	December 20, 2022
Abe a Go Go	Oddworld Inhabitants	November 13, 2013			June 2, 2022	June 2, 2022
Heroine Dream	GungHo Online Entertainment	November 27, 2013				
Tokyo 23ku Seifuku-Wars	GungHo Online Entertainment	November 27, 2013				
Doko Demo Issho / Doko Demo Issho Tsuika Disc: Koneko Mo Issyo	Sony Interactive Entertainment	December 3, 2013				
Namco Museum Volume 1	Bandai Namco Entertainment	December 11, 2013				
Namco Museum Volume 2	Bandai Namco Entertainment	December 11, 2013				
Namco Museum Volume 3	Bandai Namco Entertainment	December 11, 2013				
Namco Museum Volume 4	Bandai Namco Entertainment	December 11, 2013				
Heroine Dream 2	GungHo Online Entertainment	December 18, 2013				
Namco Anthology 1	Bandai Namco Entertainment	December 18, 2013				
Namco Anthology 2	Bandai Namco Entertainment	December 18, 2013				
Namco Museum Encore	Bandai Namco Entertainment	December 18, 2013				
Namco Museum Volume 5	Bandai Namco Entertainment	December 18, 2013				
Smash Court 2	Bandai Namco Entertainment	January 15, 2014				
Starblade Alpha	Bandai Namco Entertainment	January 22, 2014				
Akumajō Dracula	Konami	February 12, 2014				
Galaxian 3	Bandai Namco Entertainment	February 12, 2014				
Ms. Pac-Man Maze Madness	Bandai Namco Entertainment	February 26, 2014				
Puyo Puyo SUN Ketteiban	Sega	March 12, 2014				
Smash Court 3	Bandai Namco Entertainment	March 12, 2014				
Dragon Valor	Bandai Namco Entertainment	March 26, 2014				
Grand Theft Auto	Rockstar Games	April 23, 2014				
Tom Clancy's Rainbow Six	Ubisoft	April 23, 2014				
Expert	Hamster	May 28, 2014				
Susume! Kaizoku	Artdink	June 11, 2014				
Brightis	Sony Interactive Entertainment	June 25, 2014				
Pocket MūMū	Sony Interactive Entertainment	August 6, 2014				
Strider Hiryu 1&2	Capcom	August 27, 2014				
Vib-Ribbon	Sony Interactive Entertainment	October 8, 2014				
Roommate: Inōe Ryoko	GungHo Online Entertainment	October 22, 2014				
Pocke-Kano: Fumio Ueno	GungHo Online Entertainment	November 5, 2014				
Pocke-Kano: Shizuka Hōjōin	GungHo Online Entertainment	November 5, 2014				
Pocke-Kano: Yumi Aida	GungHo Online Entertainment	November 5, 2014				
Silhouette * Stories	GungHo Online Entertainment	November 5, 2014				
I'Max Shogi II	GungHo Online Entertainment	December 3, 2014				
Monster Farm 2	Koei Tecmo	December 3, 2014				
Pocket Jiman	Sony Interactive Entertainment	December 3, 2014				
Street Fighter Zero	Capcom	December 3, 2014				
Street Fighter Zero 2'	Capcom	December 3, 2014				
Street Fighter Zero 3	Capcom	December 3, 2014				
Taikai Nobunaga Ten: Ge-Ten II	GungHo Online Entertainment	December 3, 2014				
Rockman 8: Metal Heroes	Capcom	December 17, 2014				
Rockman Battle & Chase	Capcom	December 17, 2014				
Rockman X4	Capcom	December 17, 2014				
Rockman X5	Capcom	December 17, 2014				
Tron ni Kobun	Capcom	December 17, 2014				
Cooking Fighter	Nippon Ichi Software	April 30, 2015				
Rockman X6	Capcom	July 8, 2015				
Shiritsu Justice Gakuen: Nekketsu Seishun Nikki 2	Capcom	July 8, 2015				
Super Puzzle Fighter II Turbo	Capcom	July 22, 2015				
Kileak: The Blood	Genki	September 16, 2015				
Kileak: The Blood 2: Reason in Madness	Genki	September 16, 2015				
Lunar 2: Eternal Blue	Game Arts	September 16, 2015				
Kuon no Kizuna	Full On Games	October 21, 2015				
DamDam StompLand	Sony Interactive Entertainment	January 27, 2016				
Kahen Sōkō Gunbike: Speed Power Gunbike	Inti Creates	January 27, 2016				
Capcom Generation 5: Dai-go-shū Kakutōka-tachi	Capcom	February 3, 2016				
Gambler Jiko Chūshinha Gambler: Ippatsu Shōbu!	Game Arts	March 9, 2016				
Doki Doki Poyatachio!!	Studio Saizensen	April 20, 2016				
Battle Arena Toshinden	Takara Tomy	November 22, 2016				
Battle Arena Toshinden 2 Plus	Takara Tomy	November 22, 2016				
Battle Arena Toshinden 3	Takara Tomy	November 22, 2016				
Advanced V.G. 2	Entergram	May 2, 2017				
Exector	Arc System Works	May 2, 2017				
Nekketsu Oyako	Sega	September 27, 2017				
Puyo Puyo 2	Sega	September 27, 2017				
Puyo Puyo~n: Kaa-kun to Issho	Sega	October 25, 2017				
A-Ressha de Ikou Z: Mezase! Tairiku Oudan	Artdink	November 22, 2017				
Kaze no Notam	Artdink	November 22, 2017				
ToPoLo	Artdink	November 22, 2017				
GunBare! Game Tengoku	City Connection	November 22, 2017				
Idol Janshi Suchie-Pai Limited	City Connection	November 22, 2017				
Puyo Puyo BOX	Sega	November 22, 2017				
Meremanoid	Mebius	November 22, 2017				
The Blue Marlin	Starfish	November 22, 2017				
Asuncia: Matsue no Jubaku	Mebius	November 22, 2017				
Super Black Bass X2	Starfish	November 22, 2017				
The Mystic Dragoons	Mebius	November 22, 2017				
Silent Möbius - Case: Titanic	GungHo Online Entertainment	March 7, 2018				
Phix no Daiboken: Phix in the Magnetix World	GungHo Online Entertainment	May 23, 2018				
Zera-Chan Puzzle: Pitatto Pair	GungHo Online Entertainment	May 23, 2018				
Hikari no Shima: Seven Lithographs in Shining Island	GungHo Online Entertainment	May 23, 2018				
Yōchien Gaiden Kareinaru Casino Club: Double Draw	GungHo Online Entertainment	May 23, 2018				
World Neverland: Olerud Ōkoku Monogatari	Althi	October 24, 2018				
World Neverland 2: Pluto Kyōwakoku Monogatari	Althi	October 24, 2018				
Sentimental Graffiti Yakusoku	GungHo Online Entertainment	January 22, 2019				
Blaze & Blade: Eternal Quest	GungHo Online Entertainment	August 27, 2019				
Blaze & Blade: Busters	GungHo Online Entertainment	August 27, 2019				
Disney•Pixar Toy Story 2: Buzz Lightyear Sanjō!	Disney Interactive Studios				June 2, 2022	June 2, 2022
Minna no Golf	Sony Interactive Entertainment				June 2, 2022	June 2, 2022
Syphon Filter	Sony Interactive Entertainment				June 2, 2022	June 2, 2022
Worms Armageddon	Team17				June 2, 2022	June 2, 2022
Worms World Party	Team17				June 2, 2022	June 2, 2022
Star Wars: Demolition	Disney Interactive Studios				January 17, 2023	January 17, 2023
Twisted Metal	Sony Interactive Entertainment				July 18, 2023	July 18, 2023
Jet Moto '98	Sony Interactive Entertainment				February 20, 2024	February 20, 2024

== See also ==
- List of PS one Classics (North America)
- List of PS one Classics (PAL region)
- List of PlayStation Store TurboGrafx-16 games
- List of downloadable PlayStation 2 games
- High-definition remasters for PlayStation consoles
