= Takeo Miratsu =

Japanese music composer for video games (1960 - 2006)

Takeo Miratsu 見良津 健雄
- Born: February 15, 1960; Japan
- Died: September 5, 2006 (aged 46)
- Years active: 1990–2002

Takeo Miratsu (見良津 健雄, Miratsu Takeo; February 15, 1960 – September 5, 2006) was a Japanese music composer for video games and anime. He was a member of Twin Amadeus, who composed songs for the Beatmania IIDX series of music video games. He died in September 2006 due to liver cancer, at the age of forty-six years.

== Composition and arrangement ==
=== Games ===
- Jumping Flash! (1995)
- Jumping Flash! 2 (1996)
- Robbit Mon Dieu (1999)
- Pocket MuuMuu (1999)
- The Legend of Dragoon (1999)
- Chase the Express (2000)

=== Anime ===
- Violence Jack: Hell's Wind (1990)
- Abashiri Family (1991)
- Eiyuu Gaiden Mozaicka (1991)
- Idol Defense Force Hummingbird (1993)
- Battle Skipper (1995)
- Ninja Cadets (1996)
- Detatoko Princess (1997)
- Himitsu no Akko-chan (1998)
- Itsumo Kokoro ni Taiyō o! (1999)
- Saikano (2002)
