= Daisuke Tsuda (YouTuber) =

Japanese YouTuber

Daisuke Tsuda (津田 大介)
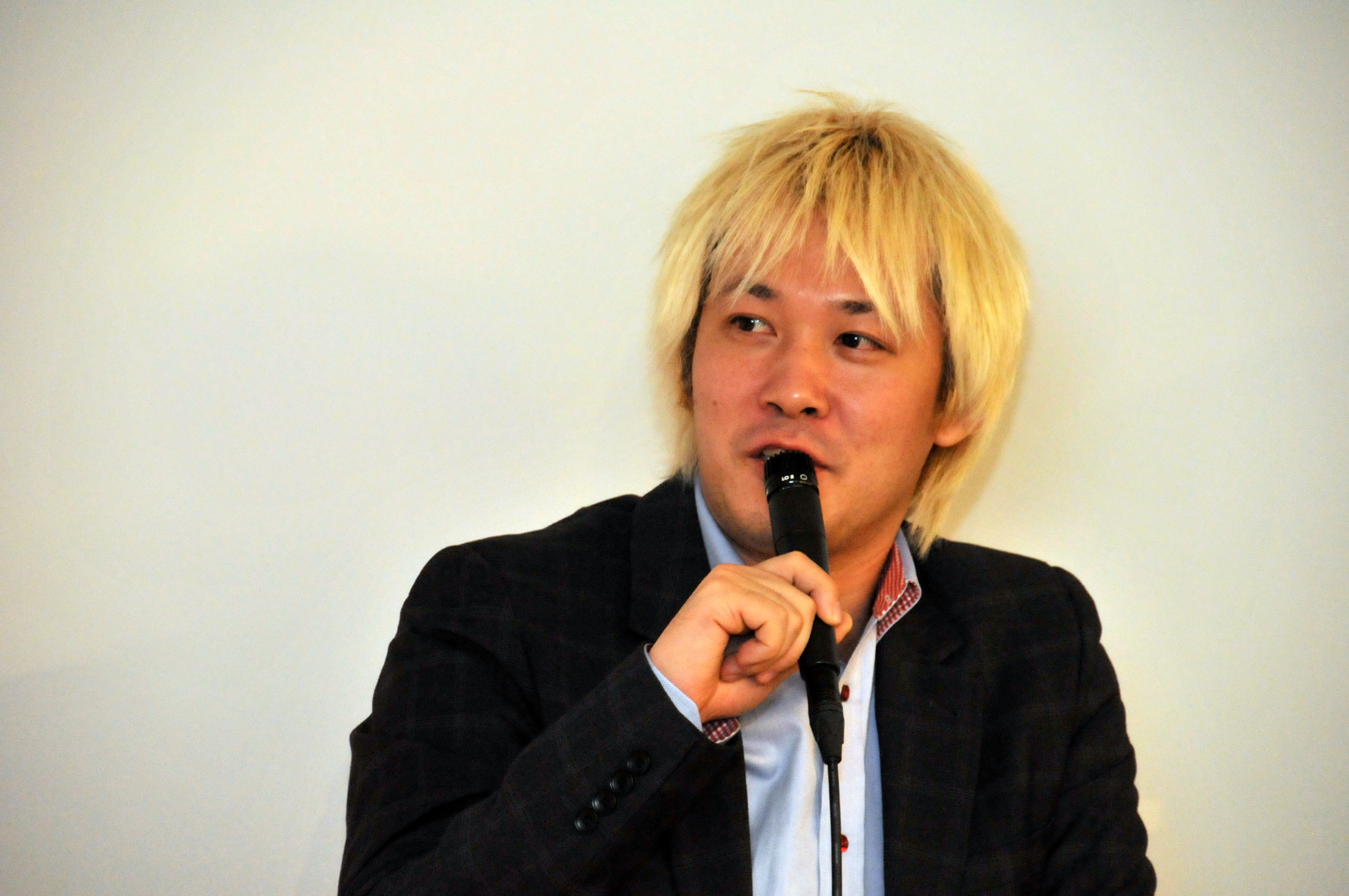
- Born: November 15, 1973 (age 52); Kita, Tokyo, Japan
- Education: Waseda University
- Occupations: YouTuber; Journalist

YouTube information
- Channel: POLITAS TV
- Years active: 2020–present
- Subscribers: 64.4 thousand
- Last updated: 9 October 2024

Daisuke Tsuda (津田 大介, Tsuda Daisuke; born November 15, 1973), is a Japanese YouTuber, political activist, social activist and writer originally from Kita, Tokyo. He graduated from the Social Sciences Department of Waseda University.

He launched the YouTube channel "POLITAS TV (ポリタスTV)" in 2020 and became a political opinion YouTuber.

== Writing ==
Year	Japanese Title	Rough English translation	Publisher
2003	だからWinMXはやめられない "Dakara WinMX wa yamerarenai"	"That's why we can't stop WinMX"	Impress Co.
2004	ググる——検索エンジンGoogleを使ってネット上の情報を検索すること "Guguru -- Kensaku enjin Google wo tsukatte nettojō no jōhō wo kensaku suru"	"Google -- Using the search engine Google to search for information on the Internet"	Mainichi Communications
2004	だれが「音楽」を殺すのか？ "Dare ga 'ongaku' wo korosu no ka?"	"Who is killing 'music'?"	Shoeisha
2006	仕事で差がつくすごいグーグル術 "Shigoto de sa ga tsuku sugoi gūguru"		Seishun Publishing Co. (青春出版社)
2007	CONTENT'S FUTURE ポストYouTube時代のクリエイティビティ "CONTENT'S FUTURE Posuto YouTube Jidai no Kurieitibiti"	"CONTENT'S FUTURE: Creativity in a Post-YouTube Era"	Shoeisha

== Sources ==
^ a b c "津田大介公式サイト | プロフィール". 2020年8月20日閲覧。

^ "津田大介さんらが"ヤング・グローバル・リーダー"に--世界経済フォーラム". マイナビニュース (2013年3月14日). 2023年3月21日閲覧。

^ Inc, Aetas. "津田大介の"本性"を見た！——ジャーナリスト津田大介氏がゲストの「ゲーマーはもっと経営者を目指すべき！」第13回". www.4gamer.net. 2019年8月1日閲覧。

^ 【津田大介】どんな仕事も初回は断らない。自分に課した辛いルールが広げた仕事の幅|VENTURE FOR JAPAN|note

^ "津田大介公式サイト | プロフィール". 2021年1月10日閲覧。

^ "世の中の大きな変わり目を経験した若者が、将来社会を変革していく". www.univcoop.or.jp. www.univcoop.or.jp (2021年7月19日). 2023年8月8日閲覧。

^ "津田大介「ウェブで政治を動かす！」書評 新しい民主主義を作るために". book.asahi.com. book.asahi.com (2012年12月2日). 2023年8月8日閲覧。

^ 津田大介ツイッター2011年5月3日2022年10月26日閲覧

^ a b "津田大介さん". すぎなみ学倶楽部 (2014年1月14日). 2021年6月18日閲覧。

^ 上田市の上田染谷丘高校を昭和38年に卒業した同級生が青木村で同級会！

^ 添田隆典 (2019年5月26日). "＜家族のこと話そう＞闘う両親に影響受け ジャーナリスト・津田大介さん". 東京新聞. オリジナルの2021年5月11日時点におけるアーカイブ。 2021年3月2日閲覧。

^ 朝日新聞2013年1月31日（木曜日）「おやじのせなか」理想追い思想押しつけず(津田大介さん)

^ "大手メディアでなく「赤旗」がスクープ連発はなぜ？/FMラジオ番組 小木曽編集局長語る". www.jcp.or.jp. 2022年5月30日閲覧。

^ a b Inc, Aetas. "津田大介の"本性"を見た！——ジャーナリスト津田大介氏がゲストの「ゲーマーはもっと経営者を目指すべき！」第13回". www.4gamer.net. 2019年8月1日閲覧。

^ 『現代用語の基礎知識 2010』 p. 1225

^ a b 藤崎麻里. "「tsudaる」が生まれた日 誰も報じない審議会...中継が始まった". withnews.jp. 2022年5月30日閲覧。

^ 津田大介『情報の呼吸法』「第1章 情報は行動を引き起こすためにある」p. 19

^ "津田大介さん、あいちトリエンナーレの芸術監督に就任へ". 朝日新聞. 2017年12月12日時点のオリジナルよりアーカイブ。2017年7月19日閲覧。

^ a b "『あいちトリエンナーレ』芸術監督に津田大介 「新しい芸術監督像を期待」". CINRA.NET. 2019年8月1日閲覧。

^ "日本社会の「タブー」東京で展示". ハンギョレ新聞 (2015年1月18日). 2020年8月17日閲覧。

^ "【主張】企画展再開 ヘイト批判に答えがない". 産経新聞. (2019年10月9日)

^ "愛知芸術祭アドバイザー東浩紀氏が辞意「善後策提案採用されず」". 産経新聞. (2019年8月14日). オリジナルの2021年4月20日時点におけるアーカイブ。 2022年5月30日閲覧。

^ 佐藤直子、稲垣太郎「こちら特捜部 『表現の不自由展』中止の衝撃（上） 脅迫に屈する『悪しき前例』 市長や政権 攻撃あおる 芸術監督・津田大介氏『文化に対する暴力テロ事件』」『東京新聞』2019年8月6日付朝刊、特報1面、22頁。

^ "「不自由展」監督 津田氏登壇シンポ中止へ 神戸市、抗議相次ぎ". 東京新聞. (2019年8月9日) 2021年6月18日閲覧。

^ 『中日新聞』2020年8月26日付朝刊、二社、28面、「大村知事リコール 署名集めスタート 高須氏代表の団体」。

^ "リコール署名妨害と高須院長 映画評論家らを告発". 共同通信. (2020年9月1日). オリジナルの2020年9月1日時点におけるアーカイブ。 2021年2月28日閲覧。

^ "高須氏らが愛知県を提訴 あいちトリエンナーレめぐり". 朝日新聞. (2020年12月22日) 2021年2月24日閲覧。

^ 『中日新聞』2020年11月8日付朝刊、二社、26面、「大村知事リコール 高須氏が活動終了 病状悪化で」。

^ "愛知知事リコール署名「83%に不正の疑い」 県選管が調査結果、刑事告発も検討". 毎日新聞. 2021年2月16日閲覧。

^ 津田大介 Twitter 2020年11月7日 午後9:41

^ "高須院長 津田氏に「謝罪遅れたら法廷」「癌で弱っていると思ってなめるな」". デイリースポーツ. (2020年11月8日) 2020年11月11日閲覧。

^ "愛知県知事解職請求に係る署名簿の調査の取りまとめ状況について" (PDF). 愛知県選挙管理委員会 (2021年2月1日). 2021年2月25日閲覧。

^ "知事リコール署名は83%無効 愛知県選管が不正疑い告発検討". 中日新聞. (2021年2月2日) 2021年2月25日閲覧。

^ "署名偽造容疑で田中孝博事務局長ら4人を逮捕、全容解明へ 愛知県知事リコール不正". (2021年5月19日) 2021年9月9日閲覧。

^ 「不自由展」をめぐるネット右派の論理と背理——アートとサブカルとの対立をめぐって/伊藤昌亮 - SYNODOS

^ "知事リコール署名めぐりジャーナリスト津田氏、香山氏ら4人書類送検 愛知県警：中京テレビNEWS". 中京テレビNEWS. 2021年9月9日時点のオリジナルよりアーカイブ。2021年9月9日閲覧。

^ "愛知リコール署名巡り津田大介氏ら書類送検 県警、起訴求めぬ意見か". 朝日新聞DIGITAL. 2022年6月26日閲覧。

^ "リコール署名偽造、捜査に一区切り 元市議ら7人不起訴". 朝日新聞. (2022年3月17日) 2024年3月5日閲覧。

^ "「ダウンロード違法化」で報告書まとまる iPod課金は「合意できず」". ITmedia NEWS (2008年12月16日). 2022年5月30日閲覧。

^ 新サイト「ポリタス」で政治を可視化する！編集長・津田大介氏に使い方と狙いを聞いた ダイヤモンド・オンライン 2013年7月18日

^ 「津田大介プロフィール」 津田大介公式サイト

^ 「津田大介」 幻冬舎

^ "津田大介さん、あいちトリエンナーレの芸術監督に就任へ". 朝日新聞. 2017年12月12日時点のオリジナルよりアーカイブ。2017年7月19日閲覧。

^ "津田大介とジョー横溝が仕掛ける前代未聞のトークフェス『RONDAN FES 2024 in IZU』の全貌". Rooftop (2024年8月1日). 2024年8月30日閲覧。

^ 週刊朝日 2019年3月1日号

^ プレス民主2014年3月22日 【提言】「ネットを活用し、新しい政治のうねりを」津田大介氏

^ Independent Web Journal2013年4月3日 【IWJブログ：反差別訴える市民、排外デモ隊を終始包囲】

^ ウートピ2014年6月27日 【都議会ヤジ事件】津田大介氏や蓮舫議員も参加 ネットで署名を行った市民100人が集まり今後の対策を議論

^ 弁護士ドットコム2014年6月26日 津田大介氏「セクハラヤジは日本の恥」「変わるきっかけに」イベントで意識変革訴える

^ 流行語大賞 鳥越俊太郎氏と津田大介氏、「保育園落ちた日本死ね」のトップテン入りに「賛成」産経新聞

^ "河野談話は俺じゃない！" 外務大臣に起用された河野太郎氏の人となりは 2017年08月04日 abema news

^ "https://twitter.com/tsuda/status/1456172429886181383". Twitter. 2021年11月6日閲覧。

^ "https://twitter.com/tsuda/status/1456172434273361927". Twitter. 2021年11月6日閲覧。

^ "津田大介、女性共演者の「トイレの音と匂いを想像」発言で大炎上！！（2017/08/17 徳間書店「アサジョ」）". アサジョ. 2021年11月18日閲覧。

^ "津田大介氏、不都合な真実". Togetter. 2021年10月8日閲覧。

^ "https://twitter.com/tsuda/status/1359076627460747267". Twitter. 2021年10月8日閲覧。

^ "報道ヨミトキMONDAY #14". ポリタスTV (2021年7月5日). 2021年7月6日閲覧。

^ 津田大介 - オリコンTV出演情報
