= Jumping Flash! 2 =

1996 video game

- North American box art featuring Robbit and Captain Kabuki in the background, to the left
- Developers: Exact; MuuMuu (Note: Sony Computer Entertainment Japan assisted on development.)
- Publisher: Sony Computer Entertainment
- Director: Koji Tada
- Producers: Tetsuji Yamamoto; Junichiro Ueno; Yukihito Morikawa
- Designers: Toshimitsu Odaira; Shuji Nomaguchi
- Programmer: Takashi Katano
- Artists: Kazuma Shirasaki; Yoshiaki Toratani
- Writers: Shuji Nomaguchi; Kazuya Sakamoto
- Composer: Takeo Miratsu
- Platform: PlayStation
- Release: JP: 26 April 1996; NA: 21 August 1996; UK: 1 November 1996
- Genre: Platform
- Mode: Single player

Jumping Flash! 2: Big Trouble in Little Muu, known in Japan as Jumping Flash! 2: The Tale of the Greatly Troubled Baron Aloha (Note: Japanese: ジャンピングフラッシュ! 2 アロハ男爵大弱りの巻, Hepburn: Janpingu Furasshu! Tsū: Aroha Danshaku Ō Yowari no Maki), is a 1996 platform video game developed by Exact and MuuMuu and published by Sony Computer Entertainment for the PlayStation. It is the direct sequel to Jumping Flash!, which was released the previous year. It was later re-released for the PlayStation 3 and PlayStation Portable via the PlayStation Network in 2009.

The game revolves around the robotic rabbit Robbit as he searches for lost MuuMuus, which are scattered throughout different levels in the game by Captain Kabuki. Robbit must explore each expansive new world to recapture all the lost MuuMuus. As with its predecessor, the game is presented in a first-person perspective. Much of the interface was transferred from the first Jumping Flash! to the second in order to save time during development. New features include a much longer draw distance, updated enemy AI and a meter displaying whether or not Robbit can triple-jump.

Similar to its predecessor, Jumping Flash! 2 was well received by critics, who praised the game for its updated interface, advanced graphics and gameplay. However, also like its predecessor, it was criticised for its short length, lack of challenging gameplay and close similarities to the first game. It was followed up by a sequel, Robbit Mon Dieu and a spin-off, Pocket MuuMuu.

== Plot ==
The game is set an undisclosed amount of time after the first installment in the series, Jumping Flash!. After Robbit thwarted Baron Aloha's plans to take over Crater Planet (events from the first game), Aloha flees for his life and returns to his home planet, Little Muu. While planning his revenge, however, Aloha's turn to face the fear of having his planet attacked comes. A hostile alien invader known as Captain Kabuki (voiced by Lorelei King) descends upon Little Muu and starts taking it apart, piece by piece, contrasting on what Aloha himself had once tried to do to Crater Planet in the first game. Aloha flees the onslaught in his space pod, and lands on an asteroid far away from Little Muu, where he calls for help from his sworn enemy, Universal City Hall. Once again, Robbit is dispatched to help, and manages to free the parts of Little Muu which Kabuki has taken, and ultimately faces Kabuki one-on-one in mortal combat. Robbit defeats Kabuki, resulting in the latter escaping.

Still carrying a grudge against Robbit, Aloha seeks Kabuki and convinces him to form an alliance so that they can destroy Robbit together. In exchange, Aloha will pay Kabuki a large amount of money, and Kabuki, also desiring revenge against Robbit, agrees. Aloha and Kabuki attack Little Muu together, prompting Robbit to take action again. Eventually, Robbit and Kabuki battle each other one last time, and Robbit manages to destroy Kabuki once and for all while Aloha flees for his life once again. At the end of the game, Aloha returns to Little Muu, but is disowned by all the MuuMuus, who now resent him for teaming with Kabuki, who had tried to destroy them all, and trying to destroy Robbit, who had saved their lives. They throw him out of the bar and tell him to never come back.

== Gameplay ==
A screenshot from the first level showing the updated interface

The gameplay of Jumping Flash! 2 is virtually identical to its predecessor; the game is presented in a first-person perspective, and the player can move freely in three-dimensional world and rotate the camera in any direction. The user interface resembles much of the characteristics of its predecessor; the top part of the screen shows the time remaining, the player's score, and one of four of Robbit's AI sidekicks who offers the player warnings, reminders and hints. The player retains the ability to shoot low-powered projectiles where a target reticle is centred in the middle of the screen.

Jumping Flash! 2 offers new changes and features. Instead of collecting four Jet Pods, the player-character must rescue four creatures known as MuuMuus in each level before exiting. Another new addition is the new interface, which displays one of Robbit's travelling AI companions, a health bar, a timer and a jump-meter that displays whether or not the player is eligible for a triple jump. Other new additions include the power orbs as an added power-up and the ability to obtain Performance Medals. A certain Performance Medal may be awarded depending on how the player completes a level. For example, playing through a single level without firing any weapons will reward the player with the Flower Child medal. There are a total of twelve medals to collect.

Identical to its predecessor, the core of the gameplay is centred on the player's ability to make Robbit jump and shoot projectiles at enemies. Robbit can jump up to three times (as indicated by the new interface), allowing him to reach extreme heights in the game. As with the first installment, Jumping Flash! 2 introduced new in-game power ups and weapons such as a powerful laser beam, missiles, and trip mines. In addition to the new weapons, the player can find and use the older weapons in form of fireworks to deal massive damage to enemies. Other weapons include cherry bombs, rockets and Roman candles.

== Development and release ==
As with the first installment, Jumping Flash! 2 was developed by Japanese developers Exact and MuuMuu, formerly known as Ultra, with Sony Computer Entertainment Japan assisting on development. The game engine and most of the interface were transferred from its predecessor to Jumping Flash! 2 in order to save time during the development. Improving on its predecessor, the developers decided to give Jumping Flash! 2 a much larger draw distance, higher quality textures, and updated enemy AI in order to give the game a more memorable first-person 3D perspective. Jumping Flash! 2 was not designed to be a technology demonstrator, unlike its predecessor. The game was released in Japan on 26 April 1996, in North America on 21 August, and in the United Kingdom on 1 November.

The music for both the first game and Jumping Flash! 2 was composed by Japanese video games and anime music composer Takeo Miratsu. Many of the tracks were included with tracks from the previous game (which Miratsu also composed the music for) on the Jumping Flash! 2 Original Soundtrack. The soundtrack was published by Antinos Records in Japan in 1996. Jumping Flash! 2 was re-released as a downloadable game for the PlayStation 3 and PlayStation Portable via the PlayStation Network in 2009, with the same controls and interface as the 1996 release.

== Reception ==
Reception

Aggregate score
| Aggregator | Score |
|---|---|
| GameRankings | 80% |

Review scores
| Publication | Score |
|---|---|
| AllGame | 3.5/5 |
| Computer and Video Games | 4/5 |
| Edge | 7/10 |
| Electronic Gaming Monthly | 7.5/10 |
| Famitsu | 8/10, 9/10, 8/10, 8/10 |
| GameRevolution | A− |
| IGN | 8/10 |
| Next Generation | 4/5 |
| Play | 86% |
| Dengeki PlayStation | 85/100, 90/100, 90/100, 100/100 |

Upon release, Jumping Flash! 2 received mostly positive reviews. A reviewer for Next Generation commented that "while it's nearly impossible for any sequel to have the same impact as an original, JF2 does an excellent job of recreating the magic of the first game, yet still adds creative details and fresh ideas throughout". He found that like the original, the game is far too easy, and in particular that the impressive visual presence of the bosses is lost when the player defeats them in a matter of seconds. In positive side, he noted that the levels are much larger than the original's and include hidden bonuses, giving it greater longevity. Dan Hsu and Sushi-X of Electronic Gaming Monthly criticized that the game is more of an expansion pack of the original Jumping Flash! than a new game, while Shawn Smith and Crispin Boyer applauded it for having much better graphics and larger levels than the original. GamePro's Major Mike found it made a satisfying sequel, noting additions such as underwater travel and the ability to ride objects. He also praised the lack of pixelization and the full motion video cutscenes, but agreed with Next Generation that the game is both too short and too easy. IGN staff were impressed by the game's newly expanded worlds and the inclusion of bonus worlds, and noted that despite not significantly differing from the first Jumping Flash!, the game "still delivers". Japanese gaming magazine Famitsu awarded the game as among the top 120 games reviewed by the publication in 2000.

In 1997 Electronic Gaming Monthly editors ranked Jumping Flash! 2 number 82 on their "100 Best Games of All Time", saying that while it is too short and too easy, it is an overall innovative and enjoyable game which is just slightly superior to the original.

In a retrospective review, Shawn Sackenheim of Allgame also found the main downfall of the game to be that it is too short and too easy. However, he found the new Time Attack mode and the expanded storyline to be interesting new features that extend playability. Sackenheim stated that despite the minor add-ons and overhauled textures, Jumping Flash! 2 was essentially a technical update of the 1995 original. Other criticisms include that the game is too short despite Game Revolution citing that the game offered a total of 32 levels if including the "repetitive" epilogue. Game Revolution also said that Jumping Flash! 2 was a "very worthy sequel with better graphics, higher jumps, and lots more levels", and that upon release the game "really [excelled] beyond the competition".
