= Geograph Seal =

1994 video game

- Developer: Exact
- Publisher: Exact
- Director: Hiroyuki Saegusa
- Programmers: Hiroshi Yamamoto; Kazuki Toyota
- Artists: Hiroyuki Saegusa; Toshimitsu Ōdaira
- Writer: Toshimitsu Ōdaira
- Composer: Hiroyuki Saegusa
- Platform: X68000
- Release: JP: 12 March 1994
- Genres: First-person shooter, mech simulator, platform
- Modes: Single-player, multiplayer

Geograph Seal (Note: Japanese: ジオグラフシール, Hepburn: Jiogurafu Shīru) is a first-person mecha platform-shooter video game developed and published by Exact exclusively for the X68000 in Japan on March 12, 1994. The fourth and last title to be created and released by Exact for the X68000 late into its commercial life span, after being discontinued in 1993 by Sharp Corporation with the last model launched, it is widely considered a spiritual predecessor to the Jumping Flash! franchise by Sony Computer Entertainment.

Taking place in a futuristic sci-fi setting on the fictional planet WS090, players assume the role of a pilot controlling a bi-pedal animal-like mech on an attempt to execute the titular project by fighting against the oppressive enemy robots from the surface of the planet and obliterating the planetary core in order to destroy the infested planet entirely.

Geograph Seal garnered mostly positive reception from critics who praised multiple aspects such as the presentation, graphics, sound design, controls and gameplay, becoming yet another popular title among the X68000 userbase from Exact and eventually being named "Game of the Year" by Japanese magazine Oh!X. Shortly after its late release on the computer, Exact would go on to develop a three-dimensional platform tech demo for the PlayStation that would later become into the first Jumping Flash! entry.

== Gameplay ==
Gameplay screenshot

Geograph Seal is a 3D first-person mecha platform-shooter game similar to Jumping Flash! and Quake, where the players assume the role of a pilot controlling a bi-pedal animal-like mecha in an effort to execute the titular project by fighting against oppressive enemy robots that have infested the planetary surface of WS090 and destroy the planetary core in order to obliterate the planet entirely as the main objective through six stages, with each one featuring a distinctive thematic and gameplay style.

The player's mech can jump up to three times in mid-air, which allows him to reach extreme heights and the camera tilts downwards when a double-jump or triple-jump is executed to allow the player to see their shadow and easily plan a landing spot on the ground or against enemies. The player can also shoot projectiles to dispatch enemies as well and collect multiple types of weapons such as heat-seeking rockets and laser. Across each stage, the player must complete a determined objective on the current area to face against a boss at the end to progress further through the game. If the shields of the mech reaches a critical level, it will be destroyed and the players have a limited number of continues to keep playing before the game is over, however items scattered on the area can be collected to regenerate the shields or increase the firepower of weapons. Although the mech cannot strafe on the ground, players can perform strafe-jumping left and right with their first jump. In addition to the regular single-player campaign, there is a LAN deathmatch mode, where two players battle against each other to emerge as victor of the match by connecting two X68000 computers with a serial cable.

== Development and release ==
Geograph Seal was both the fourth and last title to be developed and published by Exact for the X68000 in Japan on March 12, 1994, late into the commercial life span of the computer and a year after being discontinued in 1993 by Sharp Corporation with the last model launched, retailing for JP¥9,800. The game is compatible with multiple X68000 machines, including the X68030 and features support with multiple Roland MIDI sound modules such as the SC-55mkII and the CM-300.

== Reception ==
Reception

Review scores
Publication	Score
The Next Level	4.5/5
Oh!X	9/10; 8/10; 5/10

Award
Publication	Award
Oh!X (1994)	#1 1994年度Oh!X Game of the Year

Geograph Seal received mostly positive reception from critics since its release. Sudo Yoshima of Japanese magazine Oh!X praised the controls and music. Nishikawa Zenji, also from Oh!X magazine, praised the graphics, sound design, gameplay and technical performance. Yaegaki Nachi of Oh!X magazine as well praised the presentation, 3D visuals and sound design but he felt mixed in regards to the gameplay. Despite its late release on the platform, the game proved to be quite popular among the X68000 userbase in Japan, which would eventually led the title in garnering a "Game of the Year" award from Oh!X magazine.

Geograph Seal has been also received positively in retrospective reviews. Travis Fahs of gaming website The Next Level praised the game too for its polygon visuals, sound, and gameplay and for pushing the technical boundaries of the machine, but also stated that the game might not hold the attention from modern audiences due to its "crude graphics and early 90s flavor". Despite this assessment, he ultimately gave the title a nearly perfect score of 4 and a half stars out of 5. Stephen Moyles of Hardcore Gaming 101 commended the title for its cyberpunk aesthetic, soundtrack, gameplay and lack of language barrier, but criticized the dodgy hit detection and stated that the game's 3D engine "just isn't well-suited for a fast paced action game". Likewise, Medium's Kat Koller praised it for pushing the technical capabilities of the X68000 and similarities with its spiritual successor.

=== Legacy ===
Shortly after the release of Geograph Seal, Exact created a pre-rendered 3D platform tech demo titled Spring Man for the PlayStation that served to showcase how such a project could work on the system before eventually becoming Jumping Flash!, which was co-developed with Ultra and shares the same game engine as with the former title. It was released worldwide in 1995 to positive critical response from reviewers.
