= Ayakashi Ninden Kunoichiban =

1997 video game

あやかし忍伝くの一番 Ayakashi Ninden Kunoichiban
- Original Saturn cover art
- Developer: Zero System
- Publisher: Shōeisha
- Platforms: Windows, PlayStation, Sega Saturn
- Release: Windows: JP: March 14, 1997; Sega Saturn: JP: April 9, 1998; PlayStation: JP: September 25, 1998
- Genre: Dating sim
- Mode: Single player

Ayakashi Ninden Kunoichiban (あやかし忍伝くの一番) is a Japanese dating sim developed by Zero System and published by Shōeisha, released on March 14, 1997, for Windows 95 in Japan. A PlayStation, and Sega Saturn version were soon released as well. It is a female ninja dating sim, as well as a gal game. It is said that the lesbian elements appear to be stronger in the PlayStation version.

== Plot ==
There is a world where shinobi (ninja and kunoichi) are recognized. The story centers around Kaede, who enters Princess Yuri School (姫百合学園 Hime Yuri Gakuen) and offers assistance to three girls for one year, who happen to be guardians. The top graduate is given a special privilege to become a freelance Shinobi. After entering, Kaede strives to serve a favorite person for one year.

== Gameplay ==
There are eight different kinds of class subjects based on (忍術) Ninjutsu

- ①Language Studies (語学)
- ②Arithmetic (算術)
- ③Pharmacy (薬学)
- ④Medicine (医術)
- ⑤Jujutsu (体術)
- ⑥Manners (作法)
- ⑦Art of Concealment and Espionage studies (忍術学)
- ⑧Art of Concealment and Espionage practical skill (忍術実技)

There are 13 different endings in all. In the best ending, Kaede can marry Tsukiha.
