= Rudy Ruiz =

American writer, advocate and social entrepreneur

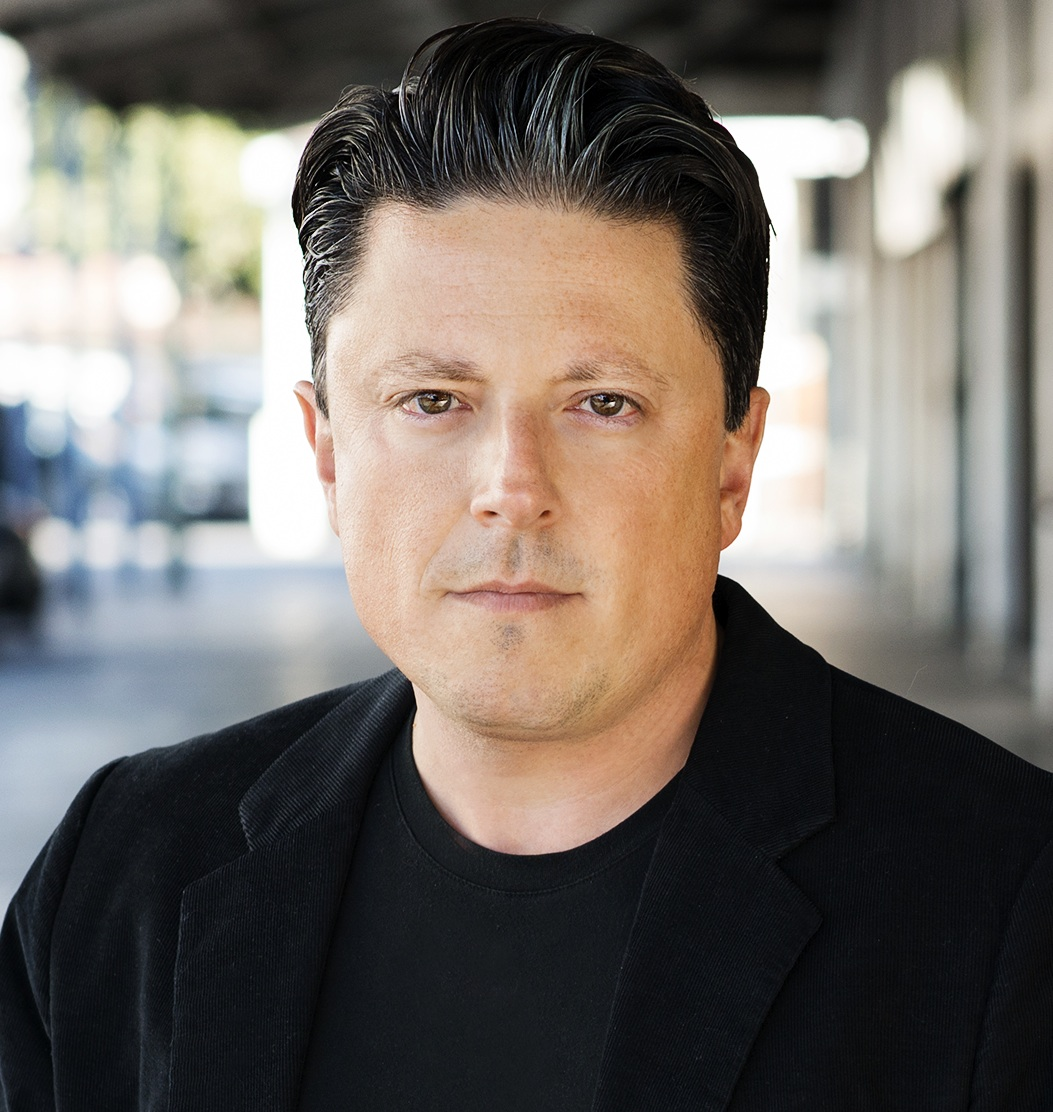
- Born: Rodolfo Ruiz; Brownsville, Texas
- Education: Harvard College (BA); Harvard Kennedy School (M.P.P.)
- Occupations: Author, entrepreneur
- Writing career
- Notable works: Adelante, Seven for the Revolution, The Resurrection of Fulgencio Ramirez, Valley of Shadows, The Border Between Us
- Notable awards: International Latino Book Award for Best Popular Fiction; International Latino Book Award for Best First Book (Fiction); Gulf Coast Prize in Fiction; Rudolfo Anaya Award for Best Latino Focused Fiction Book; International Latino Book Award for Best Audiobook; Texas Institute of Letters Jesse H. Jones Award for Best Book of Fiction; International Latino Book Award for Best Mystery; Member of the Texas Institute of Letters; Kempner Family Book Prize for Fiction
- Website: rudyruiz.com

Rudy Ruiz is an American writer, advocate, and social entrepreneur. Ruiz is known for writing The Resurrection of Fulgencio Ramirez and Valley of Shadows, magical realism novels which received critical acclaim and literary awards.

In 2014, Ruiz authored Seven for the Revolution, a book that explores the "hard lives of Latinos and the fraught relations between their native and adoptive countries." The book won Best Popular Fiction–English and Best First Book in Fiction at the 2014 International Latino Book Awards. Following the release of Ruiz's novel, The Border Between Us, he was longlisted for the 2025 Joyce Carol Oates Prize, awarded to an “author of national consequence.

Ruiz is also a regular special contributor to CNN and co-founder of Interlex, an advertising and marketing agency whose work is focused on "public sector, non-profit, and socially conscientious marketing for multicultural audiences."

== Early life ==
Rudy Ruiz was born in Brownsville, Texas, a bilingual and multicultural city along the border of Mexico. He is the son and grandson of Mexican immigrants. After graduating from St. Joseph Academy in 1986, Ruiz went on to Harvard University. He graduated from Harvard with a bachelor's degree in government and a master's degree in public policy from the John F. Kennedy School of Government. While at Harvard, Ruiz participated in Raza, Harvard's Chicano students organization. He was also part of Harvard's Undergraduate Council.

== Literary career ==
Ruiz's first works were published in literary publications while he attended Harvard. His first book, ¡Adelante!, was published in 2003 by Random House. Ruiz also wrote an essay covering stereotypes and eating disorders called "Ghost of Gordolfo Gelatino," which was published in the book Going Hungry.

In 2014, Ruiz authored Seven for the Revolution, a collection of short stories about the experiences of seven characters as they immigrate to the United States. The book was named as one of "The Top Ten Fiction Books by Latino Authors for 2014" and received four prizes at the 2014 International Latino Book Awards. The novel also earned three awards at the Latino Books into Movies Awards, including first place in the Action & Adventure category.

Ruiz's fiction writing has also appeared in literary journals, such as the Pushcart Prize-winning Ninth Letter. In 2017, Ruiz was awarded the Gulf Coast Prize for Fiction.

During the Fall of 2018, the Notre Dame Review published Ruiz's short story, "Vexing Gifts." Reviewed as "vivid" and "palpable," the magical realism satire was highly critical of President Trump's border and immigration policies.

In December 2018, it was announced that Blackstone Publishing signed a multi-book contract with Ruiz. His first novel, titled The Resurrection of Fulgencio Ramirez, explores "not just the physical border between two countries, but borders between life and death … and past and present."

In 2019, New Texas published two of Ruiz's short stories, "Ports of Entry" and "The Limes." The stories were both installments in a border bildungsroman Ruiz wrote.

In 2020, Ruiz's short story, "The Limes" was named a Finalist for the Texas Institute of Letters’ Kay Cattarulla Best Short Story Award. Also, his short story, "Oblivious," was selected – and published – as a Finalist for the Texas Observer Annual Short Story Award. In September 2020, his novel, The Resurrection of Fulgencio Ramirez, was released by Blackstone Publishing. The novel won two gold medals at the 2021 International Latino Book Awards.

In 2021, Ruiz's short story, “Allegiance,” received Honorable Mention for the Dillydoun Review's International Fiction Prize. It was subsequently published in the Dillydoun Review International Fiction Prize Anthology.

In 2022, Ruiz's novel, Valley of Shadows, was released by Blackstone Publishing. Valley of Shadows was selected as the winner of the 2023 Texas Institute of Letters' Jesse H. Jones Award for Best Book of Fiction. The novel went on to win Ruiz's seventh and eighth International Latino Book Awards.

Ruiz was elected as a member of the Texas Institute of Letters in 2024. Also in 2024, Ruiz's novel, The Border Between Us, was released by Blackstone Publishing. Following the novel's release, Ruiz was longlisted for the Joyce Carol Oates Prize, which is awarded to “an author of national consequence". The novel went on to win Ruiz's ninth and tenth International Latino Book Awards as well as the 2025 Fiction Kempner Family Book Prize presented by the Philosophical Society of Texas.

In 2026, Publishers Marketplace announced the upcoming 2027 release of Ruiz's next novel, Diablo Creek, by Blackstone Publishing.

== Advocacy ==
As an advocate, Ruiz has regularly contributed to CNN on issues such as comprehensive immigration reform, and tighter regulation and taxes on sugary drinks and unhealthy foods. His essays on the history of social injustice on the U.S.-Mexico border – “How Rudy Ruiz and His Neo-Western Aim to Change the Conversation About the U.S.-Mexico Border” and “Rudy Ruiz is Remembering the Past” - respectively appeared in LitHub’s CrimeReads and Publishers Weekly. In 2025, CommonDreams.org published Ruiz's essay on “How Immigrant Fiction Can Reshape American Realities” and Texas Highways magazine published “Ghost of the Border,” a personal essay on how the U.S.-Mexico border has changed over the past five decades.

He served on the board of directors of Center for Science in the Public Interest, a leading non-profit nutrition advocacy group based in Washington, D.C. He was also the founding editor of RedBrownandBlue.com, a multicultural political commentary website.

Ruiz created a college-level fund at Harvard supporting student growth through the Office of Culture & Community. He is an active member of PEN America, the International Society of Latino Authors, Writers' League of Texas, Harvardwood, and the Texas Institute of Letters.

=== Interlex ===
In 1995, Ruiz co-founded Interlex together with his wife Heather Ruiz in San Antonio, Texas. Ruiz is the president and CEO of the firm.

== Bibliography ==
- ¡ADELANTE!: una guía personal del éxito para usted y su familia (2003) – A guide for success for immigrants.
- Going Hungry: writers on desire, self-denial, and overcoming anorexia (2008) (Contributor) – A collection of essays about anorexia.
- Seven for the Revolution (2014) – A series of short stories that explore the lives of Latinos in America. Winner of Best Popular Fiction–English and Best First Book in Fiction at the 2014 International Latino Book Awards. Also won second place Most Inspirational Fiction Book and Honorable Mention Best Cover Design. According to Kirkus Reviews, the book contains "[w]ell-executed stories that offer fresh perspectives on long-standing societal problems."
- The Resurrection of Fulgencio Ramirez: A Novel (2020) – A novel, largely inspired by the stories of Ruiz's father, about a son of immigrants in a border town during the 1950s. ALA's Booklist named it one of the Ten Best Debut Novels of 2020. In February 2021, it was longlisted for the Reading the West Book Awards. It was also named a Finalist for the 2021 Spur Award for Best Contemporary Novel by the Western Writers of America. The novel won two gold medals at the 2021 International Latino Book Awards: the Rudolfo Anaya Best Latino Focused Fiction Book and Best Audiobook.
- Valley of Shadows (2022) – A magical realism novel set in West Texas in the 1880s. It was released in September 2022 by Blackstone Publishing. ALA's Booklist gave it a starred review, and LitHub’s CrimeReads named it one of the Best Horror Novels of 2022. The novel was awarded the 2023 Jesse H. Jones Award for Best Book of Fiction by the Texas Institute of Letters. It also received two International Latino Book Awards, for Best Mystery Novel and Best Audio Book. It was named a New York Times Book Review Paperback Row Selection and was included in the Los Angeles Times' Map of Great American Novels.
- The Border Between Us: (2024) - A Bildungsroman set along the U.S-Mexico border and in New York City, was released in August 2024 by Blackstone Publishing. ALA's Booklist gave it a starred review and Kirkus Reviews called it: “A moving story of one family’s toil amid a cultural struggle, told with precision and authenticity." Audible named the Spanish-language version one of the Ten Best Audiobooks of 2024. It also received two International Latino Book Awards, the gold medal for the Rudolfo Anaya Best Latino Focused Fiction Book and silver medal for Best Audiobook. The novel was also awarded the 2025 Fiction Kempner Family Book Prize presented by the Philosophical Society of Texas.
- Diablo Creek (2027) - A southern gothic horror novel in which a photographer from the Texas/Mexico border is recruited to investigate a series of child possessions that are seemingly tied to "Operation Wetback."
