= Epidemic (video game) =

1995 first-person shooter video game

- North American cover art
- Developer: Genki
- Publishers: JP: Sony Music Entertainment Japan; WW: Sony Computer Entertainment
- Director: Nakaji Kimura
- Designer: Tomoharu Kimura
- Programmer: Wataru Shuri
- Artists: Koh Yokoyama; Tadashi Shimada
- Writer: Manami Kuroda
- Composer: Kimitaka Matsumae
- Platform: PlayStation
- Release: JP: December 29, 1995; NA: June 14, 1996; PAL: June 14, 1996
- Genre: First-person shooter
- Mode: Single-player

Epidemic, known as Kileak: The Blood 2: Reason in Madness (Note: Japanese: キリーク・ザ・ブラッド 2, Hepburn: Kirīku za Buraddo 2) in Japan, is a 1995 first-person shooter video game developed by Genki and published by Sony Music Entertainment Japan for the PlayStation. It is a sequel to Kileak: The DNA Imperative.

== Gameplay ==
Epidemic is a first-person shooter. Like its predecessor, the gameplay in Epidemic focuses on traversing corridor-like environments, destroying enemy robots and finding key cards to reach inaccessible areas.

== Story ==
Taking place in 2065, Epidemic takes place in the underground metropolis of Neural City, where all remaining humans live after a devastating virus known as the Gigari virus has infected the surface of the planet, killing anyone who is infected with it 10 days after the symptoms are noticed. In Neural City, all activities are monitored by a super computer in the middle of the city known as Sirus, which is owned by the Byflos group, the ones behind creating the city. The game follows Masao Coda, son of Kileak: The DNA Imperative's Matt Coda, who is informed that his lover, Layla, has recently been infected with the Gigari virus and has only a week to live. In order to save Layla, her doctor tells Masao that the only way to cure her Gigari is through the Lafres Flower, only grown on the surface. Despite the doctor's warnings, Masao decides to call up his old friend Jim, who he had worked with during their days in Del-Sol, an anti-government resistance group who want to overthrow the Byflos Group, and despite Masao's refusal to join Del-Sol, Jim agrees to help Masao and gears him up in his old "Protect Armor" machine, and heads to the Information Tower to gather intel on Satavisa, the only place that can access the surface.

Upon getting the info he needed and heading to the Satavisa ruins, Masao comes across another of his allies from his days in Del Sol; Jeff Sanders. Sanders informs Masao that Carlos Potrero, leader of Del Sol and who helped Matt Coda during the events of the first Kileak, was taken by Byflos to its tower so they can know more about Del Sol. Sanders wishes for Masao's help, but he refuses, causing Sanders to walk away, ashamed that Masao wasn't who he used to be. After gathering the Lafres flower on the surface and curing Layla's condition, Masao tells Jim about his encounter with Sanders and plans to help him with the situation with Carlos. Returning to the basement of Satavisa, Masao helps Sanders from a robot and they return to Jim, where he fixes Jim's Protect Armor. Masao visits Layla in the hospital, who is revealed to be feeling better. He introduces Layla to Sanders, but Sanders becomes angry when he realizes that Layla is the daughter of Michael Byflos, the leader of Neural City. Masao denies it, but Layla panics and runs out, revealing the truth to Masao.

Later, Jim informs Masao and Sanders that the only way to reach the Byflos Tower is getting an SX-911, a new type of Power Armor from the Byflos Armory powerful enough to withstand the attacks from Byflos' defense. Upon reaching the Armory, Sanders goes on ahead, but dies after an attack from the main robot of the Armory. Despite reaching the new Power Armor, Masao informs Jim about Sanders' passing, and wants his revenge by going to the tower and saving Carlos. After saving Carlos, Masao panics when he can't find Layla, only to find a message from her telling Masao that she plans to head to the Byflos HQ to convince her father to stop his plans of using DNA as a way to achieve human perfection for the future. After following Layla to the headquarters, Masao falls victim to the Gigari virus due to his earlier exposure on the surface, and must find an antidote in the building. After finding the antidote, Masao finally reaches Layla and Byflos in the middle of their talk. Byflos tells Masao and Layla that upon discovering Kileak, the first lifeform whose DNA that Dr. Kim discovered during the first Kileak, he realizes that using Kileak's DNA could guarantee the human race's survival and that Sirus was built as a successor to Kileak and Dr. Kim's original research. Not wanting to be controlled by DNA and wanting to live by her own manner, Layla refuses his offer, but everyone is stopped by a robot that Masao had previous destroyed. Before it can attack Layla, Byflos sacrifices himself for his daughter, and Masao finishes it off. Byflos dies, Masao ponders the attack, and upon returning to Jim, he realizes that Sirus has turned against him and is now coded to believe that it must continue Kileak's ideology by 'protecting the human race' by protecting itself. Jim realizes that Sirus can only be destroyed for his influence to stop and tells Masao that he must return to the tower to stop Sirus.

Reentering the tower, Sirus taunts Masao throughout each floor, questioning why he plans to stop his plans and that freedom is only achieved by preserving DNA, not through individual happiness. Kileak is then revealed to be intruding all P.A systems throughout the city, and Masao finally reaches the top of the tower and confronts Sirus. Sirus questions why humans would prefer to live life as their own and not as nothing but DNA, but Masao chastises him and soon destroys Sirus, the Byflos Tower, and Kileak. Jim tells him that a cure for Gigari was found in Sirus' internal data and as Masao walks away, he questions Kileak's true motives, and realizes that as long as humans live, Kileak will never die. Despite this, in the epilogue, it is revealed that society was able to rebuild from the Gigari virus thanks to Masao and Del Sol, toppling Byflos and creating the cure for the virus and allowing humans to finally return to the surface for the first time in 27 years.

== Development and release ==
The game was developed by a Japanese video game company Genki and published by Sony Music Entertainment Japan for the PlayStation, as a sequel to Kileak: The DNA Imperative. The game's soundtrack was composed by Kimitaka Matsumae. A soundtrack album, Kileak: The Blood – Sound Tracks & Remix (Note: キリーク・ザ・ブラッド サウンドトラックス&リミックス, Kiriku za Buraddo Saundo Torakkusu ando Rimikkusu), was released by Sony Music on March 21, 1996. It includes remixes of the game's tracks, along with those from the first Kileak game which Matsumae also composed.

It was initially released on December 29, 1995, in Japan as Kileak: The Blood 2: Reason in Madness. This was followed by its North America release in October 1996 by Sony Computer Entertainment. Epidemic, alongside its predecessor, was released in Japan by Clarice Games on September 16, 2015, under the PlayStation Network's "Game Archives" category.

== Reception ==
Reception

Review scores
Publication	Score
Famitsu	8/10, 8/10, 8/10, 5/10
GameSpot	5.9/10
Next Generation	2/5
Dengeki PlayStation	60/100, 70/100, 80/100, 65/100

Next Generation reviewed the PlayStation version of the game and stated that "Even after all the improvements, however, Kileak 2 is still an average Doom-clone that offers nothing new to the genre."

== Follow-up ==
BRAHMA Force: The Assault on Beltlogger 9, though not bearing the Kileak name in any of the regions in which it was released, uses the same mecha-based first-person shooting format and was announced by Genki as an official follow-up to the Kileak series.
