= Jumping Flash! =

1995 video game

- Promotional artwork used in European and Asian territories.
- Developers: Exact; Ultra (Note: Sony Computer Entertainment Japan assisted on development.)
- Publisher: Sony Computer Entertainment
- Director: Koji Tada
- Producers: Tetsuji Yamamoto; Junichiro Ueno; Yukihito Morikawa
- Designers: Toshimitsu Odaira; Hiroyuki Saegusa; Shuji Nomaguchi
- Programmers: Hiroshi Yamamoto; Kazuki Toyota; Takashi Katano
- Artist: Kazuma Shirasaki
- Writers: Shuji Nomaguchi; Kazuya Sakamoto
- Composer: Takeo Miratsu
- Platform: PlayStation
- Release: JP: 28 April 1995
- Genre: Platform
- Mode: Single-player

Jumping Flash! (Note: Japanese: ジャンピングフラッシュ!, Hepburn: Janpingu Furasshu!) is a 1995 platform video game developed by Exact and Ultra and published by Sony Computer Entertainment for the PlayStation. It was originally released on 28 April 1995 in Japan, 29 September 1995 in Europe as well as 2 November 1995 in North America.

Played in a first-person perspective, the game follows Robbit, a robotic rabbit as he searches for missing jet pods scattered by the game's astrophysicist antagonist character Baron Aloha. Robbit must explore each section of Crater Planet to retrieve all of the jet pods, stop Aloha and save the world from being destroyed. The game was designed as a technology demonstration for the PlayStation console and was revealed in early 1994 under the provisional title of "Spring Man". Jumping Flash! utilises much of the game engine used in Geograph Seal, an earlier game by Exact for the X68000 home computer.

Jumping Flash! has been described as an ancestor of, as well as an early showcase for, 3D graphics in console gaming. It was generally well received by critics, who praised its graphics and unique 3D platforming gameplay, but it was eventually overshadowed by later 3D platformers of the fifth console generation. Jumping Flash! spawned two sequels: Jumping Flash! 2 and Robbit Mon Dieu. It received positive reviews at the time of release, and made an appearance in Next Generation's "Top 100 Games of All Time" just one year after. The game was described as the third-most underrated video game of all time by Matt Casamassina of IGN in 2007. It holds the Guinness World Record as the "first platform video game in true 3D".

== Gameplay ==
A still image from the first level. The interface displays the radar, time remaining, health and inventory.

Jumping Flash! is presented in a first-person perspective. The player assumes the role of Robbit, a robotic rabbit, and can freely move Robbit in three-dimensional space and can rotate the camera in any direction. The top part of the screen shows the remaining time, the player's score, and a character named Kumagoro—Robbit's sidekick artificial intelligence who offers the player warnings and hints. The top left corner of the screen shows the collected power-ups; the top right corner contains the radar showing the locations of objects including enemies, power-ups, jet pods and enemy projectiles. The bottom shows a health meter on the sides and the number of remaining lives in the centre. The player starts the game with three lives; a new life is granted once one million points are earned.

The core of the gameplay is focused on the player's ability to make Robbit jump. Robbit can jump up to three times in mid-air, which allows him to reach extreme heights. Unlike other platform games that continue to face horizontally when the player jumps, in Jumping Flash! the camera tilts downwards when a double-jump or triple-jump is performed to allow the player to see Robbit's shadow and easily plan a landing spot. The player has the ability to shoot a low-powered laser beam at a target indicator in the middle of the screen. The player can find and use fireworks for Robbit to damage enemies. These include cherry bombs, rockets, Roman candles and spinners.

Each level has a time limit of ten minutes, which ends the game if it is exceeded. Losing all lives is presented with a choice to continue or return to the title screen. Power-ups scattered across each world, presented as picture frames, include carrots that extend Robbit's health, extra lives, time-outs that stop the clock and freeze the level's dynamics for a few seconds, hourglasses that extend the player's time, and power pills that make Robbit invincible for a short period of time. Enemies in the game vary from anthropomorphic versions of creatures to robots and plants.

The game is composed of six worlds with three levels each, totalling to 18 main levels. The objective of the main levels in each world is to collect four jet pods. Each final level of a world consists of a boss fight. The level designs vary from snow-capped mountains to carnivals. While most of the levels are large, outdoor excursions, two are enclosed within a narrow interior. The game features hidden bonus levels, which are triggered when secret entrances are found. Bonus levels consist of blocks with balloons in them; popping the balloons yields either coins or power-ups. A time attack mode is available for any level the player has completed.

== Plot ==
The game begins on Crater Planet and revolves around the story of an insane astrophysicist, Baron Aloha. Planning to make a large profit from his evil ingenuity, Aloha removes giant pieces of land from the planet using machines to turn them into private resorts. Aloha removes and hides the twelve jet pods that propel each world. Witnessing the destruction, the residents of Crater Planet call for help, and in response the Universal City Hall dispatches one of their agents, a mechanical rabbit named Robbit. Robbit is ordered to explore each world to retrieve the jet pods, stop Aloha, and save Crater Planet from destruction. At the end of the game, Aloha flees to his home, Little Muu, and vows revenge on Robbit.

Throughout the game, Aloha surrounds himself with creatures called MuuMuus that appear as small, white, five-limbed creatures with miniature palm trees on their heads. Many of the game's full motion videos feature the MuuMuus in an izakaya tavern, recounting their defeat at the hands of Robbit.

== Development and release ==
Jumping Flash! was developed by Japanese developers Exact and Ultra. Exact, short for Excellent Application Create Team, was previously known for developing games for the X68000; their previous game, Geograph Seal, serves as a spiritual predecessor to Jumping Flash!, utilising the same engine and some gameplay designs. After seeing Geograph Seal and realising the potential in their game design, Sony's director of entertainment in Japan, Koji Tada, paired Exact with Ultra to develop a new game for the upcoming PlayStation console. Tada replaced Hiroyuki Saegusa as director of the game, although he had kept all key Exact staff to work on the project. Sony Computer Entertainment hoped Jumping Flash! would be remembered as the first appearance of a new "platform star" with the same longevity as Sonic the Hedgehog or Mario. The game was first revealed in early 1994 under the provisional title "Spring Man" as a technology demonstration for the upcoming PlayStation console.

The initial development was split into two phases. Exact developed the game engine and its gameplay; Ultra designed the story and 3D cutscenes, and created characters including the protagonist, a mechanical rabbit named Robbit. Ultra felt they needed to depart from the "stereotypical science fiction vibe" that included the usual "space ranger" or double agent protagonists. To create a sense of individuality among platform games, the developers implemented a dynamic camera that would automatically pan down towards the shadow of Robbit on the ground during large jumps, allowing players to carefully line up their landings. Jumping Flash! was considered the first game of the platform genre to be developed with full 3D computer graphics. The music for Jumping Flash! was composed by Japanese video games and anime music composer Takeo Miratsu. Many of the tracks, along with tracks from Jumping Flash! 2, were included on the Jumping Flash! 2 Original Soundtrack album, which Miratsu also composed.

== Reception ==
Reception

Aggregate score
Aggregator	Score
GameRankings	84%

Review scores
Publication	Score
AllGame	4/5
Edge	7/10
Electronic Gaming Monthly	9/10, 8/10, 8.5/10, 9/10
Famitsu	8/10, 9/10, 8/10, 9/10
GameFan	95/100, 96/100, 98/100
GameRevolution	A−
IGN	7.5/10
Next Generation	5/5
PlayStation Official Magazine – UK	8/10
Dengeki PlayStation	85/100, 80/100, 75/100, 90/100
Games World	83/100
Maximum	3/5

Awards
Publication	Award
GameFan Megawards	32-Bit Game of the Year, PlayStation Game of the Year, Best New Character (PlayStation)
Electronic Gaming Monthly	Game of the Month
Guinness World Records	First platform video game in true 3D

The game received generally positive reviews upon release. Critics mainly praised its unique innovation, advanced graphics, gameplay and clean textures. The four reviewers of Electronic Gaming Monthly gave it their "Game of the Month" award, citing the outstanding graphics and particularly the innovative 3D gameplay. They described the style as "cutesy" but not off-putting. "Major Mike" of GamePro said that despite the game appearing "strange", it had action, strategy, and some humour. Next Generation said that "[many] of the boundaries have been redefined in a big way", contrasting it with side-scrolling platformers with a first-person perspective and explorable 3D environments. They called it "simply superb" and gave it a "Revolutionary" five-star rating. Computer and Video Games magazine called it "one of the most innovative and entertaining games seen" and "the first true 3D platformer." Official UK PlayStation Magazine wrote that "To suggest that Jumping Flash is innovative is a criminal understatement: there's never been anything like this game in terms of sheer brain-popping wow factor."

Maximum stated that Jumping Flash! was one of the most "imaginative, playable, enjoyable" and original titles seen on the fifth generation of video game consoles. They criticised its length and lack of difficulty, expressing that it could have been one of the "greatest games ever" if it was longer and more difficult, and questioned whether it was "a really worthwhile" purchase. Game Revolution called the graphics "mind blowing" and the game itself "totally unique", but criticised the overall length and ease of play. IGN's 1996 review similarly disapproved the difficulty, stating that despite the small worlds and easy difficulty, it is "a great, genre-pushing game", also saying it is an essential for all PlayStation owners.

=== Retrospective ===
In 1996, Next Generation listed it as number 86 on their "Top 100 Games of All Time", saying it had created the genre of 3D platforming. They particularly praised "the vertigo inducing sense of height as Robbit leaps from platform to platform". In a 2007 review, Greg Miller of IGN condemned the graphics as "dated", having "jagged edges" and "muddled" colours, and said every aspect of the game is "weak" and that it had not stood "the test of time". In a retrospective review, Andrew Yoon of Engadget praised the gameplay and innovation, saying the "grainy" and "antiquated" graphics did no harm to the vibrant atmosphere of the game.

Speaking in 2007, Rob Fahey of Eurogamer stated that Jumping Flash! was arguably one of the most important ancestors of any 3D platform game, as well as asserting that the game would always have a part in videogaming history. Albert Kim of Entertainment Weekly stated that the game provided perhaps the most euphoric sensation of video gaming at the time and described the first-person perspective as "hypnotic". Maddy Thorson, the creator of the indie video game TowerFall, praised the game, saying "something about the sensation of leaping through 3D space captured my childhood imagination".

1UP.com cited its first-person platforming as a precursor to Mirror's Edge, despite suggesting that the jumping remained "woefully out of place" in the platform genre. In 2007, Matt Casamassina of IGN ranked Jumping Flash! as the third-most underrated video game of all time. After release, co-developer Ultra renamed themselves "Muu Muu", after the creatures featured in the game.

== Legacy ==
Due to its popularity, Sony produced two sequels to Jumping Flash!, including one spin-off. A direct sequel, Jumping Flash! 2—also developed by Exact—was released worldwide for the PlayStation the following year; it continued the story of Robbit and the subsequent rise and fall of Baron Aloha. The game received positive reviews upon release, with critics particularly praising its updated features. Robbit Mon Dieu was released in Japan for the PlayStation in 1999. It was met with mixed reviews. Exact merged into Sony Computer Entertainment in 2000. A loose spin-off utilising the PocketStation titled Pocket MuuMuu was released in 1999, making it the most recent game in the series to be released. In 2025, former SIE Worldwide Studios head Shuhei Yoshida revealed that a new game in the franchise was in development for PlayStation VR, but was cancelled during its early stages.

The original Jumping Flash! was re-released through the PlayStation Store in 2007 for PlayStation 3 and PlayStation Portable, in 2012 for PlayStation Vita, and in 2022 for PlayStation 4 and PlayStation 5. In recent years, Sony has referenced the series with Robbit appearing as a collectible in PlayStation Stars—a loyalty program on PlayStation Network—and as a cameo in Astro Bot.
