= Rosco McQueen Firefighter Extreme =

1997 video game

- North American cover art
- Developer: Slippery Snake Studios
- Publishers: EU: Sony Computer Entertainment Europe; NA: Psygnosis
- Platform: PlayStation
- Release: EU: September 1997; UK: November 1997; NA: 28 October 1998
- Genre: Action
- Mode: Single-player

Rosco McQueen: Firefighter Extreme (simply titled Rosco McQueen in Europe) is an action-adventure video game developed by British company Slippery Snake Studios and published by Sony Computer Entertainment for the PlayStation.

Rosco McQueen, a firefighter, is the protagonist of the game and he is visible from a 3rd-person perspective. McQueen must stop the game's villain Sylvester T. Square and his robotic minions. The overall objective of the game is to put out all fires before the building burns down.

In the game, Rosco McQueen goes through 15 towering infernos, fighting fires along the way. During normal gameplay, McQueen puts out the fires with a hose attached to a carry-on waterpack and refills are gained by collecting water bottles. An axe is used to destroy robots, Deactivate Power Boxes, Activate switches and break down doors which hinder the path to the goal. The player must also watch out for the temperature: if it gets too hot, then the game ends.

Stephen McFarlane was the lead games designer for the project and also contributing to Banjo-Kazooie: Nuts & Bolts later in his career.

== Release ==
Rosco McQueen was released by Sony Computer Entertainment Europe in Europe during the Autumn of 1997. This release also included voice acting dubbed in German, French, Italian and Spanish, in addition to the original English dub.

The game was ported and published in Japan by SCEI under the name Fire Panic: Mac no Rescue Daisakusen (ファイヤーパニック 〜マックのレスキュー大作戦〜, Faiyā Panikku 〜Makku no Resukyū Daisakusen〜; lit. "Fire Panic: Mac's Epic Rescue Battle") on 30 July 1998 with its own Japanese dub, and Sony's subsidiary Psygnosis later released the game in North America on October 1998.

The Japanese version saw a digital re-release on the PlayStation Network on September 28, 2011, for the PlayStation 3, PlayStation Vita, and PlayStation Portable.

== Reception ==
Reception

Aggregate score
Aggregator	Score
GameRankings	57%

Review scores
Publication	Score
CNET Gamecenter	2/10
Consoles +	88%
Electronic Gaming Monthly	3.875/10 (Note: Four critics of Electronic Gaming Monthly gave the game each a score of 2/10, 4/10, 4.5/10, and 5/10.)
EP Daily	7/10
Famitsu	27/40
Game Informer	3/10
GameRevolution	D−
GameSpot	5/10
Hyper	78%
IGN	4.5/10
PlayStation Official Magazine – UK	7/10

The game received mixed reviews according to the review aggregation website GameRankings. Josh Smith of GameSpot wrote in an early review that it "warrants a rental at best." GamePro said of the game: "Conceptually cool, Rosco McQueen ultimately goes up in smoke." (Note: GamePro gave the game 3/5 for graphics, 3.5/5 for sound, and two 1.5/5 scores for control and fun factor in an early review.) Game Informer gave it a negative review nearly two months before the game was released Stateside. In Japan, Famitsu gave it a score of 27 out of 40.

GameRevolution listed Roscoe McQueen as 16th on their list of the 50 Worst Game Names Ever.
