= Kileak: The DNA Imperative =

1995 video game

- North American box art
- Developer: Genki
- Publishers: JP: Sony Music Entertainment Japan; NA/EU: Sony Computer Entertainment
- Director: Nakaji Kimura
- Designer: Tomoharu Kimura
- Programmer: Kenji Shimizu
- Artists: Koh Yokoyama; Tadashi Shimada
- Writer: Manami Kuroda
- Composer: Kimitaka Matsumae
- Platform: PlayStation
- Release: JP: January 27, 1995; NA: September 9, 1995; EU: September 29, 1995
- Genre: First-person shooter
- Mode: Single-player

Kileak: The DNA Imperative, known as Kileak: The Blood (Note: Japanese: キリーク・ザ・ブラッド, Hepburn: Kirīku za Buraddo) in Japan and Europe, is a 1995 first-person shooter video game developed by Genki and published by Sony Music Entertainment Japan for the PlayStation. Sony Computer Entertainment, SMEJ's sister company, released as a launch game for the console outside Japan. Kimitaka Matsumae, former member of the S.S.T. Band, wrote the game's soundtrack.

The story follows an International Peacekeeping Force's White Lightning team leader Matt Coda, as he attempts to stop a scientist Dr. Kim from conducting unethical genetic engineering research. As the game progresses, the eponymous Kileak is revealed to be an ancient extraterrestrial creature that is the common ancestor of all life on Earth. The player controls an armored SJ 107 assault suit through the series of floor levels within a South Pole observation base. Each floor is connected by an elevator, which the player must find in order to proceed to the level below. The suit is equipped with various weapons, some of which require the suits battery power to operate.

The game received mixed reviews, with criticism targeted towards its monotonous level design and limited control scheme, while praise was given to its 3D graphics and pre-rendered cutscenes. A sequel, Epidemic, was released in Japan in December 1995 and in North America the following year. Both Kileak and Epidemic became available on the Japanese PlayStation Network in September 2015.

== Gameplay ==
From top to right clockwise, the interface displays the lock-on range bar, an automap, the current weapon, and the status of the SJ 107 suit.

Kileak: The DNA Imperative is a first-person shooter, in which the player controls an International Peacekeeping Force (IPKF) polar operative Matt Coda in an armored SJ 107 assault suit. The player can advance and retreat, move from side to side and rotate the camera in any direction. The game is set in a South Pole observation base, which is composed of floors connected by elevators. On each floor, the player must find an elevator in order to proceed to the level below. The requirements are varied between floors, with many levels requiring the use of key cards to open locked doors, while some doors are opened by puzzle solving. On reaching the elevator to the next floor, the player can save their progress to a memory card that fits into the accompanying PlayStation.

The heads-up display shows the amount of ammunition for the currently selected weapon, along with the suit's shield status and its energy. The game also features an automap to help players navigate the different areas of the game. On every floor, the player can access to the computer terminal with an ID Card and a Record Card in their possession. ID cards are used to reveal unexplored parts of the floor, while Record Cards hold pre-recorded messages that can be read with the terminal. At certain points in the game, the player can also acquire Armor ROMs to enhance the suit's defense system, which reduces damage from enemy attacks.

The SJ 107 can equip a variety of weapons, ranging from conventional armaments such as a machine gun and a rocket launcher to more exotic weaponry such as a laser gun and "erosion gun". While most weapons use ammunition, some run off of the suit's power supply. The energy decreases over time, and can be charged by picking up batteries or using an energy unit. When the energy is critically low, the suit's driving power, radar and energy-based weapons become impaired. The game ends if the SJ 107 suit either takes too much damage or runs out of power.

== Plot ==
On August 16, 2038, the International Peacekeeping Force (IPKF) headquarters receives a distress signal from undercover agent Franco Fukazawa in the Byflos Group's South Pole observation base, where it is under control by a scientist known as Dr. Kim. (Note: In the game's sequel Epidemic, the full names for Dr. Kim and Byflos are Dr. Thomas Kim and Karl Byflos, respectively; the latter is not named in Kileak.) The IPKF's White Lightning team, led by captain Matt Coda, (Note: In the Japanese version, the protagonist is named as Takashi Koda (香田 孝志).) is sent to investigate. Minutes before arrival, the White Lightning's Lyger assault helicopter is shot down by surface-to-air missiles, separating Coda and lieutenant Carlos Potrero (Note: Carlos's full name is Carlos Potrero. Throughout the game, he is simply referred to as "Carlos".) in the process. Coda emerges from the crash, and penetrates the South Base. Carlos also survives the attack, and makes radio contact with Coda throughout the game.

Over the course of the game, Coda and Carlos learns from Dr. Kim's sound recordings found in the South Base that a creature named "Kileak" is the first lifeform to have appeared on Earth, and the progenitor of all life on the planet. Kim found Kileak's DNA from an unknown pyramidal structure in the excavation pit, and used it to genetically engineer a race of mutant creatures. In other recordings, Byflos confronted Dr. Kim over his use of Kileak's DNA, and hid an "erosion gun" in his office for anyone who can stop Kim.

As Dr. Kim plans to use an intercontinental ballistic missile (ICBM) to spread the mutant DNA all over the planet, Coda descends to one of the base's lower levels and stops an ICBM from launching. Advancing deeper into the South Base's excavation pit, Coda faces Kim, who turns himself into an alien-like monster. Coda manages to kill the creature, and escapes from the South Base. The voice of Kileak reveals to Coda that the human race began long after the creature's civilization was destroyed by a comet. The South Base collapses, and a space station containing Kileak ascends into space.

== Development and release ==
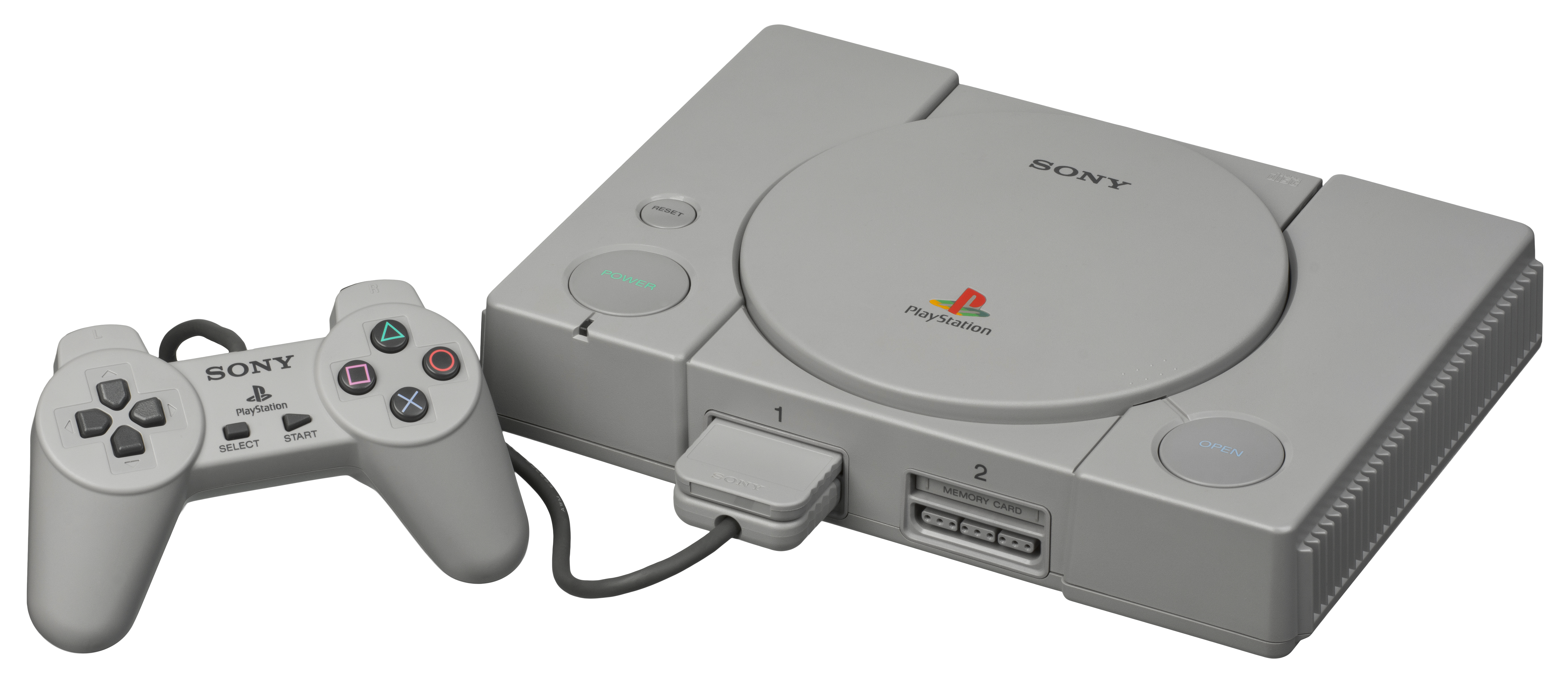
Kileak was a launch game for the PlayStation in both North American and European regions

The game was developed by a Japanese video game company Genki and published by Sony Music Entertainment Japan for the PlayStation. It was initially released in Japan on January 27, 1995. The game would later be released in North America on September 9, 1995, by Sony Computer Entertainment. Its European release was followed on September 29, 1995. Kileak: The DNA Imperative was a North American and European launch game for the PlayStation, alongside other games such as Ridge Racer, Battle Arena Toshinden and Street Fighter: The Movie.

The music for Kileak: The DNA Imperative was composed by Kimitaka Matsumae, former member of Sega's in-house band, the S.S.T. Band. Matsumae was hired by the producer, who thought that Matsumae's ambient works were dark. He felt his benefit of creating "extreme" themes would be crucial for producing the game's music, and stated that the development team gave him a lot of freedom. The music was influenced from the game's sound effects, which Matsumae created with a synthesizer and an effector while not composing at all. Kileak uses the PlayStation's sound processing unit for the in-game music with 100-kilobyte samples and MIDI data. Matsumae composed the music with Sony's software development kit, in which he found it difficult to use, but there was no decline in sound quality. The music for the game's cutscenes were CD-ROM XA or CD-DA sounds.

A soundtrack album, Kileak: The Blood – Sound Tracks & Remix (Note: キリーク・ザ・ブラッド サウンドトラックス&リミックス, Kiriku za Buraddo Saundo Torakkusu ando Rimikkusu), was released by Sony Music Entertainment Japan on March 21, 1996. It includes remixes of the game's tracks, along with those from its sequel Epidemic which Matsumae also composed.

== Reception ==
Reception

Review scores
Publication	Score
AllGame	3/5
Electronic Gaming Monthly	6.875/10
Famitsu	31/40
IGN	3.0/10
Next Generation	3/5
PlayStation Official Magazine – UK	4/10
Dengeki PlayStation	75/100, 60/100, 60/100, 75/100
Maximum	3/5

The reviews towards Kileak: The DNA Imperative was mixed. The Official UK PlayStation Magazine (OPM UK) criticized its gameplay as "uninspired" and "shallow", and complained that two consecutive levels were identical apart from differences in their "wallpaper, mood lighting, and layout". IGN similarly felt that the levels are "all very homogeneous" as they shared similar enemies and graphical detail. Tommy Glide of GamePro said the game controls well but relies on dull enemies who use cheap attacks. OPM UK also noted that the enemies are "suitably menacing".

The game also earned praise for its 3D graphics. Maximum's review stated that "the graphics looked incredible", while Next Generation opined that it helped to strengthen the environment's realism. IGN remarked that the graphics are detailed, and the enemies are "realized in 3-D for that scary, in-your-face feel." GamePro praised the detailed environments, smooth scrolling, and full-motion video cutscenes. OPM UK also praised the game's cutscenes, especially its "awesome" introduction and ending. Conversely, GamePro criticized the game's ambient audio, calling it a "wimpy techno", while OPM UK derided it as "Brian Eno on valium".

The four reviewers of Electronic Gaming Monthly repeatedly compared Kileak to Robotica, a very similar Sega Saturn game released at almost the same time as Kileak, with varying opinions: Danyon Carpenter said that Kileak, though "a little boring", was "definitely the best one", while Al Manuel held Robotica to be clearly superior in strategic design, overall fun, and most especially control. Maximum also commented on the striking similarity between the two games, and judged Kileak to be "far superior to the Saturn title" but mediocre in absolute terms due to its dull and repetitive gameplay. GamePro added to the comparison Iron Angel of the Apocalypse: The Return, a 3DO game released a few months before, and said all three games are "too polite" due to their robot enemies which do not look remotely threatening.

In a retrospective review for AllGame, Shawn Sackenheim found the collection of enemies unoriginal. However, he applauded the cutscenes, writing that they tend to "jump in at major plot points and during transitional periods where the game needs to be loaded". Sackenheim was also impressed by game's ambient audio.

== Legacy ==
A sequel to Kileak: The DNA Imperative, titled Epidemic, was released in Japan on December 29, 1995, as Kileak: The Blood 2: Reason in Madness, and in North America in October 1996. Like its predecessor, the gameplay in Epidemic focuses on traversing corridor-like environments, destroying enemy robots and finding key cards to reach inaccessible areas. BRAHMA Force: The Assault on Beltlogger 9, though not bearing the Kileak name in any of the regions in which it was released, uses the same mecha-based first person shooting format and was announced by Genki as an official follow-up to the Kileak series. Kileak, along with Epidemic, was released in Japan by Clarice Games on September 16, 2015, under the PlayStation Network's "Game Archives" category.

Kileak: The DNA Imperative was considered one of very few efforts to top Id Software's hit Doom during the time when the game was released. Bob Mackey of USgamer listed Kileak as one of the worst launch games for the PlayStation, alongside Street Fighter: The Movie and Total Eclipse Turbo.
