= Interlex =

American marketing and advertising company

- Industry: Social marketing, Cause marketing
- Founded: 1995; 30 years ago
- Founders: Heather Ruiz; Rudy Ruiz
- Headquarters: San Antonio, Texas, United States
- Number of employees: 50
- Website: interlexusa.com

Interlex Communications, known as simply Interlex, is an American social marketing and advertising company. The company has offices in Texas, New York, and California.

Founded in 1995 by Heather Ruiz and Rudy Ruiz, Interlex initially focused on developing communications strategies related to public policy. In 2012, Interlex acquired advertising agency SenaReider based in Monterey, California.

Interlex has worked on social awareness campaigns for TracFone Wireless, AARP, American Express, Del Monte, and public health campaigns for government entities, the American Heart Association, American Cancer Society, and United Healthcare. Internationally, Interlex has worked on human rights and disaster relief campaigns for the Organization of American States and Pan American Development Foundation.
