= Gussun Oyoyo =

- Genre: Puzzle-platformer
- Developer: Irem
- Publishers: Xing, Banpresto, JVC Digital
- Platforms: Arcade, Super Nintendo Entertainment System, PlayStation, Sega Saturn

Gussun Oyoyo (Note: Japanese: ぐっすんおよよ) is a series of puzzle-platformer video games developed by Irem. The first entry was released for arcade in 1993. Internationally, it received the name Risky Challenge. It was ported by Xing to PlayStation in 1995, then for the Sega Saturn the next year under the title Gussun Oyoyo S. Gussun Oyoyo S was later rereleased for the PlayStation in 2000. A Super Nintendo port by Banpresto was released in 1995, under the title Super Gussun Oyoyo, with Super Gussun Oyoyo 2 following the next year. Banpresto released Zoku Gussun Oyoyo for the PlayStation still in 1996, with a Sega Saturn version the next year. Irem released a final title, Gussun Paradise, in 1996, for the PlayStation. It was released in Europe in 1999 by JVC Digital, under the title YoYo's Puzzle Park.
