= Robbit Mon Dieu =

1999 video game

- Developer: Sugar & Rockets (Note: Additional work by Sony Computer Entertainment Japan.)
- Publisher: Sony Computer Entertainment
- Directors: Toshimitsu Odaira; Koji Tada
- Producer: Tetsuji Yamamoto
- Designer: Toshimitsu Odaira
- Programmer: Kazuki Toyota
- Artist: Kazuma Shirasaki
- Writer: Shuji Nomaguchi
- Composers: Tetsuo Ishikawa; Yoshifumi Iio; Daisuke Kikuchi
- Series: Jumping Flash!
- Platform: PlayStation
- Release: JP: October 14, 1999
- Genre: Platform
- Mode: Single-player

Robbit Mon Dieu (ロビット・モン・ジャ), sometimes referred to as Jumping Flash! 3, is a 1999 platform game developed by Sugar & Rockets and published by Sony Computer Entertainment for the PlayStation. It was released only in Japan on October 14, 1999. It is the third and final game in the Jumping Flash! series. The game was later released on the Japanese PlayStation Network on July 26, 2007.

== Story ==
The inhabitants of planet Hananuma find themselves encountering numerous problems that they are unable to solve alone, and their call for help is answered by the Universal City Service, who send Robbit to Hananuma to rectify things and put the inhabitants at peace once again.

== Gameplay ==
The gameplay controls are virtually identical to the two previous games, with the reduction of special weapons slots from three to one, and the addition of a slamming move after pressing the triangle button while in the air. Instead of roaming around worlds collecting Jet Pods or MuuMuus, the objective of each level varies from having to turn on four water wells to destroy thirteen ghosts in a graveyard to transporting somebody home.

== Reception ==
Robbit Mon Dieu was given a 31 out of 40 by gaming publication Famitsu. The game was given a 5.4 out of 10 by the website GameSpot, citing it as a disappointing sequel to the series.
