= Shōeisha =

Japanese books and media publisher

Shōeisha Co., Ltd.
- Industry: Video games, publishing
- Founded: 1986
- Headquarters: Tokyo, Japan
- Key people: Mikio Sasaki (President and CEO)
- Revenue: 50 million yen
- Number of employees: 130 (April 1, 2020)
- Website: Shoeisha Co., Ltd.Homepage

Shōeisha Co., Ltd., sometimes abbreviated SE, is a publisher specializing in computer and software books. They have more than 1,000 publications, including programming books and application tutorials.

Formerly, Shōeisha produced video games for various consoles, including the PlayStation, Dreamcast, and Sega Saturn. Twenty-three such titles were released 1995 through 2001.

== Video game releases ==
Title	Year	System
BreakThru!	1995	PlayStation, Sega Saturn
That's Pon!	1995	PlayStation
Building Crush!	1996	PlayStation
Grille Logic	1996	PlayStation
Tsuukai!! Slot Shooting	1996	PlayStation, Sega Saturn
Zork I: The Great Underground Empire	1996	PlayStation, Sega Saturn
Bishoujo Variety Game: Rapyulus Panic	1996	Sega Saturn
Tsuukai!! Slot Shooting	1996	Sega Saturn
Ayakashi Ninden Kunoichiban	1997	PlayStation
Project GaiaRay	1997	PlayStation
Panerutia Story: Karen no Daibouken	1997	Sega Saturn
Wara² Wars (ワラワラウォーズ 激闘！大軍団バトル)	1997	Sega Saturn
Bouken Katsugeki Monomono	1997	Sega Saturn
Misaki-Aggressive!	1998	PlayStation
Seirishouken: Princess of Darkness	1998	PlayStation
Ayakashi Ninden Kunoichiban	1998	Sega Saturn
Alef's BladeMaker	1999	PlayStation
Dekiru! Game Center	1999	PlayStation
Koyasai: A Sherd of Youthful Memories	1999	PlayStation
Gensou no Artemis: Actress School Mystery Adventure	2000	PlayStation
Macross M3	2001	Dreamcast
