= BRAHMA Force: The Assault on Beltlogger 9 =

1996 video game

- Developer: Genki
- Publishers: JP: Genki; NA: Jaleco; EU: JVC Music Europe
- Platforms: PlayStation, PlayStation 3, PlayStation Portable
- Release: JP: November 15, 1996; NA: April 9, 1997; EU: March 1998
- Genres: Action, shooter
- Mode: Single-player

BRAHMA Force: The Assault on Beltlogger 9, known in Japan as Beltlogger 9 (ベルトロガー9, Berutorogā 9), and in Europe as BRAHMA Force, is a 1996 video game developed by Genki for the PlayStation. It was announced by Genki as the official successor to their Kileak series.

== Release and reception ==
Reception

Aggregate score
Aggregator	Score
GameRankings	79%

Review scores
Publication	Score
AllGame	3.5/5
Electronic Gaming Monthly	7.75/10
Famitsu	8/10, 9/10, 7/10, 6/10
Game Informer	7.5/10
GameFan	77/100, 83/100, 81/100
GameSpot	7.7/10
IGN	7/10
Next Generation	3/5
PlayStation Official Magazine – UK	7/10

BRAHMA Force: The Assault on Beltlogger 9 was released for the PlayStation on November 15, 1996 in Japan.

The game received favorable reviews according to the review aggregation website GameRankings. Next Generation said, "The variety of weapons, the intelligence of level design, and the perfect degree of difficulty all combine to make BRAHMA Force a surprisingly good game."

A reviewer in GamePro gave it high ratings for its graphics, sound play control and overall fun factor.
