= Pocket MuuMuu =

1999 action video game

- Developers: Sugar & Rockets (Note: Additional work by Japan Studio)
- Publisher: Sony Computer Entertainment
- Platform: PlayStation
- Release: JP: February 4, 1999
- Genre: Action
- Mode: Single-player

Pocket MuuMuu (Note: Japanese: ポケットムームー, Hepburn: Poketto mūmū) is an action game developed by Sugar & Rockets and published by Sony Computer Entertainment for the PlayStation. It was released exclusively in Japan in 1999. It is a spin-off game in the Jumping Flash! series. The game makes use of the Sony PocketStation peripheral. PocketStation is not required to play. It was released exclusively in Japan on February 4, 1999, and received mixed reviews from critics.

== Release ==
Pocket MuuMuu is a spin-off game in the Jumping Flash! series. It was released in Japan on February 4, 1999. Sony was not interested in releasing it overseas.

== Reception ==
Reception

Review scores
Publication	Score
Famitsu	28/40
Dengeki PlayStation	75/100, 70/100, 80/100, 70/100

Pocket MuuMuu received mixed reviews from critics. In a preview, the IGN staff found the game's premise to sound strange and "even stranger in execution". However, they noticed its entertainment value, "if the past [Jumping Flash!] games are any indication". Following its release, the four reviewers at Famitsu praised its gameplay, particularly the shopping and collecting minigame aspects; they described it as "surprisingly addictive".
