= Tomomichi Nishimura =

Japanese actor, voice actor and narrator (1946–2025)

- 西村 知道
- Born: June 2, 1946; Chiba Prefecture, Japan
- Died: November 29, 2025 (aged 79)
- Occupations: Actor; voice actor; narrator
- Years active: 1975–2025
- Agent: Arts Vision

Tomomichi Nishimura (Japanese: 西村 知道, Hepburn: Nishimura Tomomichi; June 2, 1946 – November 29, 2025) was a Japanese actor, voice actor and narrator who worked for Arts Vision. He was most known for the roles of the Narrator of YuYu Hakusho, Tsuchikage Ohnoki (Naruto Shippuden), Mitsuyoshi Anzai (Slam Dunk), Shibaraku Tsurugibe (Mashin Hero Wataru), and Jamitov Hymem (Mobile Suit Zeta Gundam). In video games, he was best known as the voice of Akuma/Gouki and M. Bison/Vega (Street Fighter). He died on November 29, 2025, at the age of 79.

== Filmography ==
=== Television animation ===
1970s

- Lupin the Third Part II (1978) (Onabess' Aide) (ep. 42)

1980s

- Urusei Yatsura (1981–1986) (Principal)
- Heavy Metal L-Gaim (1984-1985) (Giwaza Lowau)
- Uchuusen Sagittarius (1986) (Gorian)
- Transformers: Headmasters (1987–1988) (Cyclonus)
- Transformers: Victory (1989) (Deathcobra) (ep. 19)

1990s

- Future GPX Cyber Formula (1991) (Pitalia Lope)
- Sailor Moon (1992–1995) (Rei's Grandfather)
- YuYu Hakusho (1992–1994) (Jorge Saotome/Blue Ogre, Narrator)
- Slam Dunk (1994–1996) (Mitsuyoshi Anzai)
- Neon Genesis Evangelion (1995) (Captain of Over the Rainbow)
- Street Fighter II V (1995) (Balrog/Mike Bison)
- Slayers (1995) (Mr. Rossburg)
- Initial D (1998) (Yuuichi Tachibana)
- The Big O (1999–2000) (Morgan Schuyler) (eps. 10–11)

2000s

- Gear Fighter Dendoh (2000) (Chief Shibuya)
- One Piece (2001) (Kamonegi)
- Rave Master (2001) (Shiba Roses)
- The Twelve Kingdoms (2002-2003) (Enho, Old minister (ep. 10))
- The Big O (2003) (Senior Officer) (eps. 23, 26)
- Rockman.EXE Axess (2004) (Videoman.EXE)
- Rockman.EXE Stream (2004) (Videoman.EXE)
- Paranoia Agent (2004) (Yoshio Hiranuma) (ep. 10)
- Samurai Champloo (2004) (Kikuzō) (ep. 1)
- Futari wa Pretty Cure (2004) (Belzei Gertrude)
- Bleach (2005) (Chief of Rukongai) (ep. 22)
- Naruto (2005) (Hachidai)
- Rockman.EXE Beast (2006) (Videoman)
- One Piece (2006–2007) (Captain T-Bone, Don Accino (eps. 326–335))
- Black Lagoon (2006) (Tsugio Bando)
- Hataraki Man (2006) (Tatsuhiko Umemiya)
- Ghost Hunt (2007) Reimei Minami (eps. 18–20)
- Hayate no Gotoku (2007) (Mikado Sanzenin)
- Golgo 13 (2008) (Wilson) (ep. 29)
- Fresh Pretty Cure! (2009) (Moebius)

2010s

- Digimon Fusion (2010) (Archelomon) (eps. 5–6)
- Panty & Stocking with Garterbelt (2010) (Judge) (ep. 8)
- Squid Girl (2010) (Principal) (ep. 5)
- Supernatural: The Anime Series (2011) (Gail) (eps. 5, 14)
- Naruto Shippuuden (2011) (Ōnoki)
- Beelzebub (2012) (Behemoth)
- Moyashimon Returns (2012) (Keizō Itsuki)
- One Piece (2012) (Panz Fry) (eps. 576–578)
- Black Bullet (2014) (Matsuzaki)
- Classroom Crisis (2015) (Seigo Sasayama)
- Ghost in the Shell: Arise (2015) (Deputy Vice-Minister Amagata) (ep. 4)
- Blood Blockade Battlefront (2015) (Guevara) (ep. 1)
- Seiyu's Life! (2015) (Sekigami)
- The Rolling Girls (2015) (Fubito Kuramochi)
- Absolute Duo (2015) (Equipment Smith (a.k.a. Edward Walker))
- One Piece (2016) (Miyagi)
- Dragon Ball Super (2017) (Kuru)
- Boruto: Naruto Next Generations (2017) (Ōnoki)

2020s

- One Piece (2020) (Hyogoro)
- The Aristocrat's Otherworldly Adventure: Serving Gods Who Go Too Far (2023) (Zenom)
- Delusional Monthly Magazine (2024) (Rock)
- Binan Kōkō Chikyū Bōei-bu Haikara! (2025) (Nuru)
- Apocalypse Bringer Mynoghra (2025) (Moltar)
- Orb: On the Movements of the Earth (2025) (Dhruv)
- Jujutsu Kaisen (2026) (Furudate)
- Rooster Fighter (2026) (Old Man) (ep. 1) (Final role)

Unknown date

- .hack//Sign (Lios, Tartarga)
- Chrono Crusade (Edward "Elder" Hamilton)
- Domain of Murder (Inspector Yamagishi)
- Full Metal Panic! series (Mardukas)
- Genesis Climber Mospeada (Jim Warston)
- GeGeGe no Kitarō 6th series (Demon Belial) (ep. 33)
- Idol Angel Yokoso Yoko (Chogoro Shibuya)
- Mashin Eiyuuden Wataru series (Shibaraku Tsurugibe)
- Mobile Suit Zeta Gundam (Jamitov Hymem)
- Moomins (The Hobgoblin)
- Ojarumaru (Mike)
- Oniisama e... (Mariko's Father)
- Rin-ne (Kuroboshi)
- Sol Bianca (Lind)
- The World of Narue (Tail Messa)
- Valkyrie Profile 2: Silmeria (Walther)

=== Original video animation ===
- Transformers: Scramble City (1986) (Silverbolt, Superion)
- Starship Troopers (1988) (Captain Ian Frankel)
- Mobile Suit Gundam 0083: Stardust Memory (1991) (Jamitov Hymem)
- Genocyber (1994) (Sgt. Jim Kelly)
- Street Fighter Alpha: The Animation (2000) (Akuma/Gouki)
- Project A-ko 2: Plot of the Daitokuji Financial Group (Kaihatsu Bucho)
- ACCA: 13-Territory Inspection Dept. - Regards (2020) (Vint)

=== Theatrical animation ===
- Castle in the Sky (1986) (Train Operator)
- Kiki's Delivery Service (1989) (Clock Tower Guard)
- Patlabor: The Movie (1989) (Matsui)
- Patlabor 2: The Movie (1993) (Matsui)
- Slam Dunk (1994) (Mitsuyoshi Anzai)
- Slam Dunk: Conquer the Nation, Hanamichi Sakuragi! (1994) (Mitsuyoshi Anzai)
- Slam Dunk: Shohoku's Greatest Challenge! (1995) (Mitsuyoshi Anzai)
- Slam Dunk: Howling Basketman Spirit!! (1995) (Mitsuyoshi Anzai)
- Pokémon Ranger and the Temple of the Sea (2006) (Ship)
- Ghost in the Shell: The New Movie (2015) (Amagata)
- Pokémon the Movie: Volcanion and the Mechanical Marvel (2016) (Eliphas)
- The Deer King (2021)
- To Every You I've Loved Before (2022)
- To Me, the One Who Loved You (2022)

=== Video games ===
Year	Title	Role	Console	Source
1994	Captain Tsubasa	Charlie Takahashi	Sega CD	
1995	Street Fighter Alpha	Akuma, M. Bison	Arcade, PlayStation, Sega Saturn, Windows, CPS Changer, Java ME	
1996	Street Fighter Alpha 2	Akuma, M. Bison	Arcade, PlayStation, PlayStation 2, Sega Saturn, SNES, Windows	
1996	Super Puzzle Fighter II Turbo	Akuma	Arcade, PlayStation, Sega Saturn, Windows, Dreamcast, Game Boy Advance, PlayStation 3, Xbox 360, Xbox One, Mobile phones	
1996	Street Fighter EX	Akuma, M. Bison	Arcade, PlayStation	
1998	Dragon Force II	Gung Ho		
1998	Street Fighter Alpha 3	Akuma, M. Bison	Arcade, Dreamcast, Game Boy Advance, PlayStation, PlayStation Portable, Sega Saturn (Japan only)	
1998	Rival Schools: United by Fate	Raizō Imawano	Arcade, PlayStation	
1999	Street Fighter III: 3rd Strike	Akuma	Arcade, Dreamcast, PlayStation 2, Xbox, PlayStation 3, Xbox 360, PlayStation 4, Xbox One, Nintendo Switch, Steam	
1999	Street Fighter EX2	M. Bison	Arcade, PlayStation (EX2 Plus only)	
2001	Capcom vs. SNK 2	Akuma, Shin Akuma	Arcade, Dreamcast, PlayStation 2, Xbox, GameCube, PlayStation Network	
2002	Shinobi	Kobushi	PlayStation 2, PlayStation Network	
2003	SNK vs. Capcom: SVC Chaos	Akuma, Shin Akuma	Arcade, Neo Geo AES, PlayStation 2, Xbox	
2003	Everybody's Golf 4	Suzuki, Shawn	PlayStation 2	
2005	Namco × Capcom	Akuma, M. Bison	PlayStation 2	
2006	Enchanted Arms	Josei	Xbox 360, PlayStation 3	
2011	Final Fantasy XIII-2	Arbiter of Time	PlayStation 3, Xbox 360, Microsoft Windows, iOS, Android	
2015	Tales of Zestiria	Mayvin	PlayStation 3, PlayStation 4, Microsoft Windows	
2015	Return to PopoloCrois	King	Nintendo 3DS	
2018	Judge Eyes	Mitsugu Matsugane	PlayStation 4	
2020	Final Fantasy Crystal Chronicles: Remastered Edition	Meh Gaj	Android, iOS, Nintendo Switch, PlayStation 4	

- Super Puzzle Fighter II Turbo (1996) (Akuma)
- X-Men vs. Street Fighter (1996) (Akuma, M. Bison)
- Marvel Super Heroes vs. Street Fighter (1997) (Akuma, M. Bison)
- Super Gem Fighter Mini Mix (1997) (Akuma)
- Street Fighter III: 2nd Impact (1997) (Akuma)
- Marvel vs. Capcom 2: New Age of Heroes (2000) (Akuma, M. Bison)
- Street Fighter EX3 (2000) (M. Bison)
- Capcom vs. SNK: Millennium Fight 2000 (2000) (Akuma)
- Everybody's Golf 3 (2001) (Suzuki)
- Fullmetal Alchemist and the Broken Angel (2003) (Mudi Nemda)
- Capcom Fighting Jam (2004) (Shin Akuma)
- Everybody's Tennis (2006) (Suzuki)
- Everybody's Golf 5 (2007) (Suzuki)
- White Knight Chronicles (2008) (Rapacci)
- Muramasa: The Demon Blade (2009) (Mumyoudoujin)
- Everybody's Tennis Portable (2010) (Suzuki)
- Summon Night 5 (2013) (Meadow)

unknown date

- .hack series (Lios)
- Ace Combat: Assault Horizon (Pierre La Pointe)
- AeroWings series (Commanding Officer)
- Galerians (Clinic Chief Lem)
- Gihren no Yabou series (Jamitov Hymem)
- Halo 2 (High Prophet of Truth, Gravemind) (Japanese Dub)
- Halo 3 (High Prophet of Truth, Gravemind) (Japanese Dub)
- Infamous 2 (Joseph Bertrand III) (Japanese Dub)
- Naruto games (Ōnoki)
- Perfect Dark Zero (Dr. Caroll) (Japanese Dub)
- SD Gundam G Generation Spirits (Jamitov Hymem)
- Super Robot Wars (Maier V. Branstein)
- Valkyrie Profile 2: Silmeria (Walther)
- Ghost of Tsushima (Gyozen/ Legends Storyteller)

=== Tokusatsu ===
- Engine Sentai Go-Onger (Engine Jum-bowhale)
- Engine Sentai Go-onger: Boom Boom! Bang Bang! GekijōBang!! (Engine Jum-bowhale)
- Engine Sentai Go-onger vs. Gekiranger (Engine Jum-bowhale)
- Kamen Rider × Kamen Rider Gaim & Wizard: The Fateful Sengoku Movie Battle (Beast Chimaera)
- Kamen Rider Wizard (Beast Chimaera (ep. 18, 29, 49))
- Samurai Sentai Shinkenger vs. Go-onger: GinmakuBang!! (Engine Jum-bowhale)
- Ultraman 80 (Space Ninja Alien Baltan VI)

=== Drama CDs ===
- Border Line Series (Yoshiyuki Murou)
- Mirage of Blaze series 1: Mahoroba no Ryuujin (Narrator)

=== Dubbing roles ===
==== Live-action ====
- Anchorman: The Legend of Ron Burgundy (Edward Harken (Fred Willard))
- Before and After (Panos Demeris (Alfred Molina))
- Captain Corelli's Mandolin (Colonel Johannes Barge (Patrick Malahide))
- Collide (Geran (Ben Kingsley))
- Commando (Diaz (Carlos Cervantes), Darryl (Peter DuPont))
- Coneheads (Ronnie Bradford (Chris Farley))
- Eat Pray Love (Richard (Richard Jenkins))
- Evil Dead II (1991 TV Tokyo edition) (Jake (Dan Hicks))
- Existenz (Kiri Vinokur (Ian Holm))
- The Glenn Miller Story (2000 TV Tokyo edition) (Don Haynes (Charles Drake))
- Goldfinger (2006 DVD edition) (Felix Leiter (Cec Linder))
- Good Omens (Witchfinder Sergeant Shadwell (Michael McKean))
- Here Comes the Boom (Marty Streb (Henry Winkler))
- Hot Fuzz (Insp. Frank Butterman (Jim Broadbent))
- The Hunt for Red October (Captain 2nd Rank Vasily Borodin (Sam Neill))
- Jarhead (Lt. Col. Kazinski (Chris Cooper))
- John Carter (Dalton (Nicholas Woodeson))
- Joshua (Chester Jenkins (Michael McKean))
- Nineteen Eighty-Four (Tillotson (Andrew Wilde))
- Nixon (E. Howard Hunt (Ed Harris))
- Noel (Artie Venizelos (Alan Arkin))
- Police Story (John Ko (Charlie Cho))
- Pulp Fiction (Winston Wolfe (Harvey Keitel))
- Risen (Pontius Pilate (Peter Firth))
- The River Wild (Terry (John C. Reilly))
- Shout at the Devil (1985 TBS edition) (Kapitänleutnant Ernst Kyller (Horst Janson))
- Sniper 2 (James Eckles (Dan Butler))
- Superhero Movie (Uncle Albert (Leslie Nielsen))
- Tootsie (Leslie "Les" Nichols (Charles Durning))
- West Side Story (1979 TBS edition) (Tiger (David Bean))

==== Animation ====
- Cars 2 (Toppolino Uncle)
- Pocahontas (1995) (Lon)
