= Easy Come Easy Golf =

2021 video game

- The Nintendo eShop cover art
- Developer: Clap Hanz
- Publisher: Clap Hanz
- Platforms: Nintendo Switch, iOS
- Release: JP: 2021; NA: 2021
- Genre: Sports
- Modes: Single-player, multiplayer

Easy Come Easy Golf is a golf video game by Japanese game developer Clap Hanz. After developing a number of iterations of the Everybody's Golf and Hot Shots Golf entries for Sony, the game was their first attempt to self-publish a golf game on their own. Originally released as Clap Hanz Golf for Apple Arcade in 2021, the game was rebranded as Easy Come Easy Golf as it received its release on the Nintendo Switch in 2022. The game was generally well-received, with critics noting that it built on the gameplay established Everybody's Golf franchise and made it their own with new aspects.

== Gameplay ==
The game largely plays the same as the sport of golf. The player must use a golf club to hit a golf ball into a hole in the lowest amount of attempts. Each time hits the ball, the player aim to measure out the best trajectory for the ball to avoid obstacles and get closer to, or in, the hole. This is generally done over a series 9 or 18 holes in a golf course. Typically, the sport is played solo or with individuals participating, though many of the game's game modes focus on a team-based set up, where the player plays as different player characters with different attributes on each hole.

== Development ==
In the 1990s, Sony, after creating their first video game console, the original PlayStation, created their own golf video game franchise, Everybody's Golf (Hot Shots Golf in North America). The first entry, Everybody's Golf (1997) was developed by Camelot Software Planning, but after they moved on to developing the Mario Golf (1999) and subsequent entries in the franchise for Nintendo, Sony needed to look for a new developer. Japanese development studio Clap Hanz was selected, and developed every entry in the series between Everybody's Golf 2 (1999) and the rebooted Everybody's Golf VR (2019), exclusively on PlayStation platforms. However, by the 2010s, releases in the Everybody's Golf had slowed down, and Clap Hanz wished to start releasing games outside of the franchise.

The team, largely working under Sony's names and control previously, chose to move in a direction that afforded them more creative freedom and identity. They chose to stick with their specialty area - golf - but moved into self-publishing. The team chose the name Clap Hanz Golf to create more recognizability for their company. They desired to create a game for mobile devices in hopes of reaching a larger number of potential players, eventually choosing to work with Apple on iOS devices on the Apple Arcade subscription service so the team could release a console-like experience without having to rely on mobile video game monetization techniques like in-app purchases or loot boxes.

The team aimed to create a control system that was different from the standard "three button press" system for gauging golf swings in golf video games. The team was influenced by PGA Tour 2K21, which featured a control system less dependent on the timing of button-pressing. While the control scheme focused on the use of device's touch screen, it also supported the use of a joystick as well. A three-button press system was eventually added to the game as well.

The game originally released exclusively for Apple Arcade in 2021. The game received a series of content updates in the year following its release. In 2022, the game was released under a new name, Easy Come Easy Golf, on the Nintendo Switch. The change in name was due to the change in focus in the second release; while its initial release on Apple Arcade was an attempt to get more awareness of the developer's name, the new name was more about trying to promote the concept of the game. Despite the name change, it was largely the same game; bundling all of the content updates from the subscription service and releasing it together for $20 USD on the eShop. Both versions continued to received content updates, the team was able to management concurrent development on both due to being developed in Unity. Both versions of the game generally originally ran at 30 frames per second until September 2025, when it received an update that upgraded performance to 60 frames per second. Publications noted that the upgrade was released just prior to the release of Everybody's Golf Hot Shots (2025), the first entry of the franchise since the departure of Clap Hanz.

== Reception ==
The game was generally well-received by TouchArcade, Nintendo Life, IGN, and Digitally Downloaded. Reviewers generally approved of Clap Hanz new approach to controlling golf swings, and the multiple control options available to the player. The wealth of playable content and unlockable characters and costumes were praised, particularly what had accumulated after years of updates. Multiple reviewers enjoyed the nostalgia of recreating the aesthetic of golf video game's from the 1990s with modern flourishes as well. The game's performance was mixed; some reviewers thought it solid, while others complained about occasional slowdown or crashes across various devices. Reviewers were generally less positive about the sound; some found the music decent and fitting for a golf game, while others found it dull. The voiceacting was found to be repetitive and irritating by some.

Some reviewers noted a preference towards the game over Everybody's Golf (2017) and Mario Golf: Super Rush (2021).
