= List of best-selling PlayStation 2 video games =

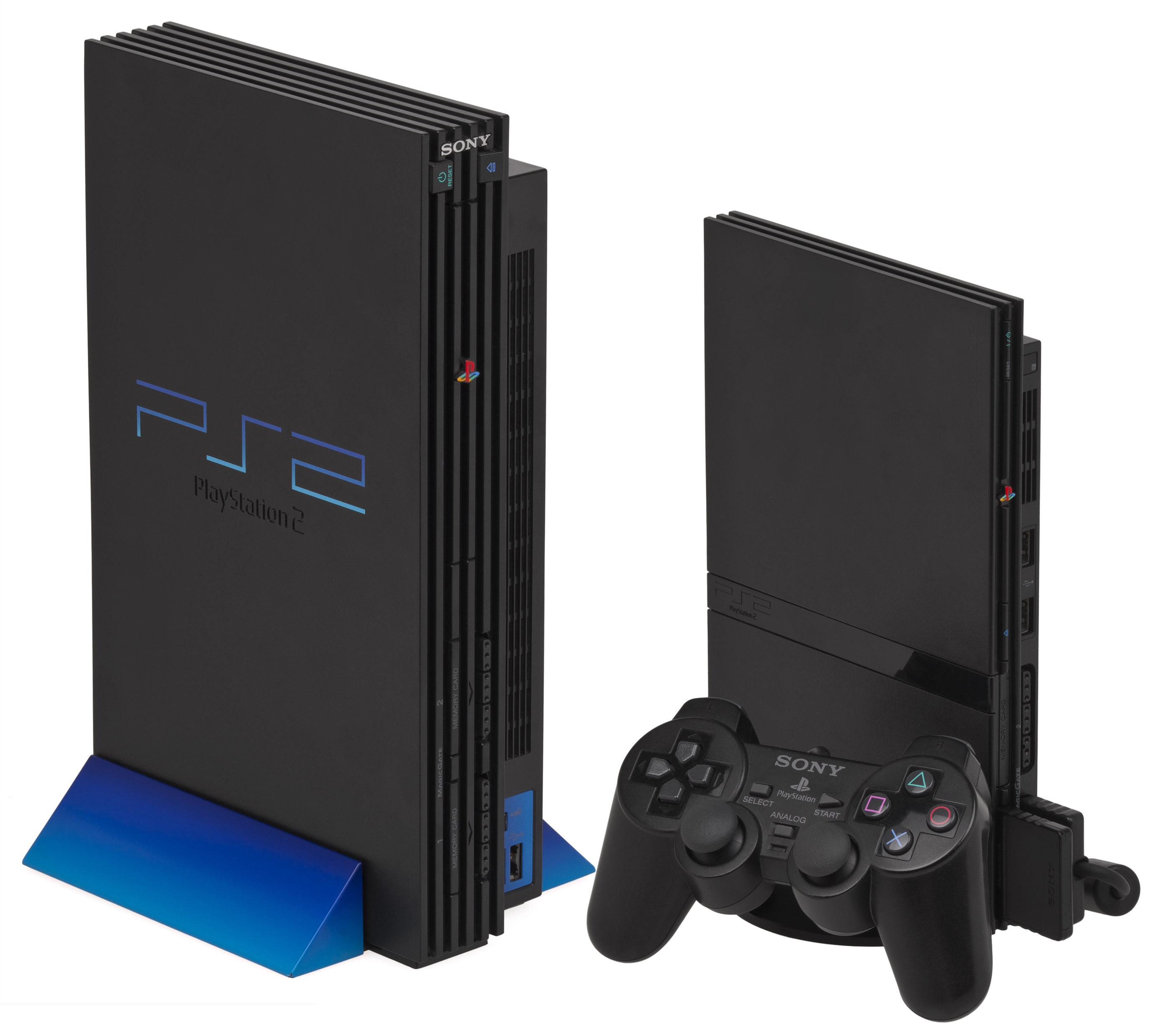
Original PlayStation 2 and Slimline PlayStation 2 with DualShock 2 controller

This is a list of video games for the PlayStation 2 video game console that have sold or shipped at least one million copies. The best-selling game on the PlayStation 2 is Grand Theft Auto: San Andreas. An action-adventure game developed by Rockstar North, San Andreas was originally released in North America on October 26, 2004, and went on to sell 17.33 million units worldwide. The second-best-selling game on the console is Gran Turismo 3: A-Spec (2001), which sold 14.89 million units. The top five is rounded out by Grand Theft Auto: Vice City (2002) with 14.2 million units, Gran Turismo 4 (2004) with 11.75 million units sold, and Grand Theft Auto III (2001) with 11.6 million units sold.

There are a total of 167 PlayStation 2 games on this list which are confirmed to have sold or shipped at least one million units. Of these, 30 were published in one or more regions by Sony Computer Entertainment. Other publishers with multiple million-selling games include EA Sports with twenty games, Electronic Arts with eighteen games, Capcom with fourteen games, Activision and THQ with twelve games each, and Konami with ten games. The developers with the most million-selling games include EA Tiburon with twelve games and Capcom and EA Canada, with nine games each in the list of 113. The most popular franchises on PlayStation 2 include Grand Theft Auto (44.83 million combined units), Gran Turismo (29.61 million combined units), Madden NFL (23.48 million combined units), Final Fantasy (21.15 million combined units), Metal Gear (15.47 million combined units), and Pro Evolution Soccer (13.16 million combined units). The oldest game on this list is Tekken Tag Tournament, first released on the platform on March 30, 2000.

As of March 31, 2012, a total of 1.537 billion copies of PlayStation 2 software had been shipped worldwide.

== List ==
Game	Copies sold	Release date (Note: Only the initial release date on this platform is listed.)	Genre(s)	Developer(s)	Publisher(s)
Grand Theft Auto: San Andreas	17.33 million (Note: Grand Theft Auto: San Andreas sales breakdown: Japan – 557,132; United Kingdom – 1.75 million; United States – 7.89 million)	October 26, 2004	Action-adventure	Rockstar North	WW: Rockstar Games; JP: Capcom
Gran Turismo 3: A-Spec	14.89 million (Note: Gran Turismo 3: A-Spec sales breakdown: Asia – 1.9 million; Europe – 5.85 million; North America – 7.14 million)	April 28, 2001	Sim racing	Polyphony Digital	Sony Computer Entertainment
Grand Theft Auto: Vice City	14.2 million (Note: Grand Theft Auto: Vice City sales breakdown: Japan – 601,445; Germany – 200,000+; United Kingdom – 1.25 million; United States – 8.2 million)	October 27, 2002	Action-adventure	Rockstar North	WW: Rockstar Games; JP: Capcom
Gran Turismo 4	11.76 million (Note: Gran Turismo 4 sales breakdown: Asia – 1.45 million; Europe – 6.83 million; North America – 3.47 million)	December 28, 2004	Racing	Polyphony Digital	Sony Computer Entertainment
Grand Theft Auto III	11.6 million (Note: Grand Theft Auto III sales breakdown: Japan – 455,455; Germany – 200,000+; United Kingdom – 1 million+; United States – 6.65 million)	October 22, 2001	Action-adventure	DMA Design	WW: Rockstar Games; JP: Capcom
Tekken 5	9.43 million (Note: Tekken 5 sales breakdown: Europe – 4 million; Japan – 357,064)	March 31, 2005	Fighting	Namco	WW: Namco; EU: Sony Computer Entertainment
Final Fantasy X	8.60 million (Note: Final Fantasy X sales breakdown: Japan – 3,307,619; Germany – 100,000+; United Kingdom – 200,000+; United States – 2.77 million)	July 19, 2001	Role-playing	Square Product Development Division 1	JP: Square; NA: Square Electronic Arts; PAL: Sony Computer Entertainment
Metal Gear Solid 2: Sons of Liberty	7.03 million (Note: Metal Gear Solid 2 sales breakdown: Sons of Liberty – 5.64 million; Japan – 1,336,843; Europe – 1.57 million; United States – 2.31 million; Substance – 1.39 million)	November 12, 2001	Action-adventure; stealth	Konami Computer Entertainment Japan	Konami
Final Fantasy XII	6.40 million (Note: Final Fantasy XII sales breakdown: Europe – 1.1 million; Japan – 2,605,717; United States – 1.7 million)	March 16, 2006	Role-playing	Square Enix	Square Enix
Kingdom Hearts	6.30 million (Note: Including Final Mix and Ultimate Hits.) (Note: Kingdom Hearts sales breakdown: Japan – 2,006,601; United Kingdom – 100,000; United States – 3.45 million)	March 28, 2002	Action role-playing	Square	JP: Square; NA: Square Electronic Arts; EU: Sony Computer Entertainment
Final Fantasy X-2	5.50 million (Note: Final Fantasy X-2 sales breakdown: Japan – 2,608,756; North America – 1.85 million; United Kingdom – 100,000)	March 13, 2003	Role-playing	Square Product Development Division 1	JP: Square; NA/PAL: Square Enix
Kingdom Hearts II	5.20 million (Note: Including Final Mix+ and Ultimate Hits.) (Note: Kingdom Hearts II sales breakdown: Europe – 700,000; Japan – 2,027,262; United States – 2.03 million)	December 22, 2005	Action role-playing	Square Enix Product Development Division 1	Square Enix
Dragon Quest VIII: Journey of the Cursed King	4.84 million (Note: Dragon Quest VIII: Journey of the Cursed King sales breakdown: Europe – 410,000; Japan – 3,705,170; North America – 430,000)	November 27, 2004	Role-playing	Level-5	Square Enix
God of War	4.62 million (Note: God of War sales breakdown: Asia – 142,990; Japan – 59,814; Latin and North America – 2,881,524; United States – 2.33 million; PAL regions – 1,592,833; United Kingdom – 100,000)	March 22, 2005	Action-adventure; hack and slash	Santa Monica Studio	WW: Sony Computer Entertainment; JP: Capcom
Madden NFL 2005	4.35 million (Note: Sales data only reported for the United States.)	August 9, 2004	Sports	EA Tiburon	EA Sports
Tekken 4	4.35 million	March 28, 2002	Fighting	Namco	JP/NA: Namco; EU: Sony Computer Entertainment
Tekken Tag Tournament	4.35 million (Note: Tekken Tag Tournament sales breakdown: Japan – 457,340; Germany – 100,000+; United Kingdom – 300,000+; United States – 1.61 million)	March 30, 2000	Fighting	Namco	WW: Namco; EU: Sony Computer Entertainment
God of War II	4.24 million (Note: God of War II sales breakdown: Asia – 113,280; Latin and North America – 2,527,522; PAL regions – 1,603,727)	March 13, 2007	Action-adventure; hack and slash	Santa Monica Studio	WW: Sony Computer Entertainment; JP: Capcom
Metal Gear Solid 3: Snake Eater	4.23 million (Note: Metal Gear Solid 3: Snake Eater sales breakdown: Japan – 1,129,926; United Kingdom – 200,000+; United States – 1.42 million)	November 17, 2004	Action-adventure; stealth	Konami Computer Entertainment Japan	Konami
Jak and Daxter: The Precursor Legacy	4.2 million	December 3, 2001	Platform	Naughty Dog	Sony Computer Entertainment
EyeToy: Play	4 million	July 4, 2003	Party	London Studio	Sony Computer Entertainment
Madden NFL 2004	3.95 million	August 12, 2003	Sports	EA Tiburon	EA Sports
Madden NFL 06	3.77 million	August 8, 2005	Sports	EA Tiburon	EA Sports
Ratchet & Clank	3.71 million	November 4, 2002	Platform	Insomniac Games	Sony Computer Entertainment
Need for Speed: Underground	3.69 million (Note: Need for Speed: Underground sales breakdown: Japan – 94,108; United Kingdom – 600,000; United States – 3 million)	November 17, 2003	Racing	EA Black Box	EA Games
Star Wars: Battlefront	3.61 million (Note: Star Wars: Battlefront sales breakdown: Japan – 16,739; United Kingdom – 200,000; United States – 1.77 million)	September 20, 2004	First-person shooter; third-person shooter	Pandemic Studios	LucasArts
Star Wars: Battlefront II	3.59 million (Note: Star Wars: Battlefront II sales breakdown: Japan – 27,419; United Kingdom – 300,000; United States – 2.01 million)	October 31, 2005	Action; third-person shooter; first-person shooter	Pandemic Studios	LucasArts
Medal of Honor: Frontline	3.55 million (Note: Medal of Honor: Frontline sales breakdown: Japan – 152,966; United Kingdom – 600,000; United States – 2.8 million)	May 28, 2002	First-person shooter	EA Los Angeles	EA Games
Lego Star Wars: The Video Game	3.53 million (Note: Lego Star Wars: The Video Game sales breakdown: Japan – 20,068; United Kingdom – 600,000; United States – 1.88 million)	April 2, 2005	Action-adventure	Traveller's Tales	Eidos Interactive; Giant Interactive Entertainment
Guitar Hero II	3.41 million (Note: Guitar Hero II sales breakdown: United Kingdom – 100,000; United States – 3.31 million)	November 7, 2006	Music; rhythm	Harmonix	RedOctane
Pro Evolution Soccer 3 (Note: Known as World Soccer: Winning Eleven 7 in Japan and World Soccer: Winning Eleven 7 International in North America.)	3.36 million (Note: Pro Evolution Soccer 3 sales breakdown: Japan – 1,687,375; Europe – 1.55 million; United States – 33,403)	August 7, 2003	Sports	Konami Computer Entertainment Tokyo	Konami
Star Wars: Episode III – Revenge of the Sith	3.32 million (Note: Star Wars: Episode III – Revenge of the Sith sales breakdown: Japan – 61,221; United Kingdom – 300,000; United States – 1.41 million)	May 4, 2005	Action	The Collective	LucasArts
Guitar Hero III: Legends of Rock	3.23 million (Note: Guitar Hero III: Legends of Rock sales breakdown: Canada – 82,000; United Kingdom – 200,000; United States – 2,951,700; With guitar – 2.72 million; Without guitar – 231,700)	October 28, 2007	Music; rhythm	Neversoft	Activision
Ratchet & Clank: Up Your Arsenal	3.22 million	November 3, 2004	Platform	Insomniac Games	Sony Computer Entertainment
Madden NFL 2003	3.18 million	August 12, 2002	Sports	EA Tiburon; Budcat Creations	EA Sports
Pro Evolution Soccer 4 (Note: Known as World Soccer: Winning Eleven 8 in Japan and World Soccer: Winning Eleven 8 International in North America.)	3.13 million (Note: Pro Evolution Soccer 4 sales breakdown: Japan – 1,632,918; Europe – 1.5 million)	August 5, 2004	Sports	Konami Computer Entertainment Tokyo	Konami
The Getaway	3 million	December 11, 2002	Action-adventure	Team Soho	Sony Computer Entertainment
Ratchet & Clank: Going Commando	2.966 million	November 11, 2003	Platform	Insomniac Games	Sony Computer Entertainment
Sonic Heroes	2.9 million	December 30, 2003	Platform	Sonic Team	Sega
WWE SmackDown! vs. Raw 2006	2.9 million	November 11, 2005	Sports	Yuke's	WW: THQ; JP: Yuke's
Pro Evolution Soccer 2008	2.86 million	October 26, 2007	Sports	Konami	Konami
Pro Evolution Soccer 2 (Note: Known as World Soccer: Winning Eleven 6 and World Soccer: Winning Eleven 2002 in Japan and World Soccer: Winning Eleven 6 International in North America.)	2.84 million (Note: Pro Evolution Soccer 2 sales breakdown: Japan – 1,799,075; Europe – 1 million; United States – 59,567)	April 25, 2002	Sports	Konami Computer Entertainment Tokyo	Konami
Spider-Man	2.81 million (Note: Spider-Man sales breakdown: United Kingdom – 300,000; United States – 2.51 million)	April 15, 2002	Action-adventure	Treyarch	Activision
Madden NFL 07	2.8 million	August 22, 2006	Sports	EA Tiburon	EA Sports
SOCOM U.S. Navy SEALs	2.78 million (Note: SOCOM U.S. Navy SEALs sales breakdown: Japan – 39,973; United Kingdom – 100,000; United States – 2.65 million)	August 27, 2002	Tactical shooter	Zipper Interactive	Sony Computer Entertainment
Crash Bandicoot: The Wrath of Cortex	2.76 million (Note: Crash Bandicoot: The Wrath of Cortex sales breakdown: Japan – 212,541; United Kingdom – 600,000; United States – 1.95 million)	October 29, 2001	Platform	Traveller's Tales	Universal Interactive Studios
Ace Combat 04: Shattered Skies	2.64 million	September 13, 2001	Combat flight simulator	Namco	Namco
Dragon Ball Z: Budokai	2.61 million (Note: Dragon Ball Z: Budokai sales breakdown: Japan – 570,000; United States – 2.04 million)	November 29, 2002	Fighting	Dimps	JP/EU: Bandai Games; NA/AU: Infogrames
The Simpsons: Hit & Run	2.57 million (Note: The Simpsons: Hit & Run sales breakdown: United Kingdom – 1 million; United States – 1.57 million)	September 16, 2003	Action-adventure; racing	Radical Entertainment	WW: Vivendi Universal Games; PAL: Sierra Entertainment
Need for Speed: Most Wanted	2.53 million (Note: Need for Speed: Most Wanted sales breakdown: Japan – 114,611; United Kingdom – 600,000; United States – 1.82 million)	November 15, 2005	Racing	EA Canada; EA Black Box	Electronic Arts
Medal of Honor: Rising Sun	2.52 million (Note: Medal of Honor: Rising Sun sales breakdown: Japan – 118,054; United Kingdom – 600,000; United States – 1.81 million)	November 11, 2003	First-person shooter	EA Los Angeles	EA Games
The Lord of the Rings: The Two Towers	2.51 million (Note: The Lord of the Rings: The Two Towers sales breakdown: Japan – 73,997; United Kingdom – 600,000; United States – 1.84 million)	October 21, 2002	Action; hack and slash	Stormfront Studios	EA Games
Driver 3	2.5 million (Note: Worldwide non-final sales figure.)	June 21, 2004	Action-adventure	Reflections Interactive	Atari
Dynasty Warriors 4	2.5 million (Note: Dynasty Warriors 4 sales breakdown: Japan – 2,065,943; United States – 448,587)	February 27, 2003	Hack and slash	Omega Force	Koei
Tony Hawk's Underground	2.42 million (Note: Tony Hawk's Underground sales breakdown: Japan – 16,620; United Kingdom – 300,000; United States – 2.11 million)	October 27, 2003	Sports	Neversoft	Activision
Tony Hawk's Pro Skater 3	2.4 million (Note: Tony Hawk's Pro Skater 3 sales breakdown: United Kingdom – 300,000; United States – 2.1 million)	October 28, 2001	Sports	Neversoft	Activision O2
Devil May Cry 3: Dante's Awakening	2.3 million (Note: Devil May Cry 3: Dante's Awakening sales breakdown: Japan – 798,601)	February 17, 2005	Action-adventure; hack and slash	Capcom	Capcom
Madden NFL 2002	2.3 million	August 19, 2001	Sports	EA Tiburon; Budcat Creations	NA/EU: EA Sports; JP: Electronic Arts Square
Resident Evil 4	2.30 million	October 25, 2005	Survival horror; third-person shooter	Capcom Production Studio 4	Capcom
Dynasty Warriors 3	2.29 million (Note: Dynasty Warriors 3 sales breakdown: Japan – 1,873,137; United States – 422,175)	September 20, 2001	Hack and slash	Omega Force	JP/NA: Koei; PAL: THQ
The Simpsons: Road Rage	2.24 million (Note: The Simpsons: Road Rage sales breakdown: United Kingdom – 300,000; United States – 1.94 million)	November 24, 2001	Vehicular combat	Radical Entertainment	Electronic Arts
Ratchet: Deadlocked	2.17 million	October 25, 2005	Platform	Insomniac Games	Sony Computer Entertainment
SOCOM II U.S. Navy SEALs	2.17 million (Note: SOCOM II U.S. Navy SEALs sales breakdown: Japan – 31,664; United States – 2.14 million)	November 4, 2003	Tactical shooter	Zipper Interactive	Sony Computer Entertainment
Devil May Cry	2.16 million (Note: Devil May Cry sales breakdown: Japan – 646,865; United Kingdom – 200,000; United States – 1.29 million)	August 23, 2001	Action-adventure; hack and slash	Capcom Production Studio 4	Capcom
Hot Shot Golf 3 (Note: Known as Hot Shots Golf 3 in North America.)	2.16 million (Note: Everybody's Golf 3 sales breakdown: Japan – 1,226,480; United States – 940,000)	July 26, 2001	Sports	Clap Hanz	Sony Computer Entertainment
Max Payne	2.12 million (Note: Max Payne sales breakdown: Japan – 28,827; United Kingdom – 200,000; United States – 1.9 million)	December 6, 2001	Third-person shooter	Remedy Entertainment	Rockstar Games
Need for Speed: Underground 2	2.1 million (Note: Need for Speed: Underground 2 sales breakdown: Japan – 106,122; United Kingdom – 600,000; United States – 1.4 million)	November 15, 2004	Racing	EA Black Box	EA Games
Onimusha 2: Samurai's Destiny	2.1 million	March 7, 2002	Action-adventure; hack and slash	Capcom	Capcom
Dragon Ball Z: Budokai 2	2.08 million (Note: Dragon Ball Z: Budokai 2 sales breakdown: Japan – 584,183; United States – 1.5 million)	November 14, 2003	Fighting	Dimps	JP/EU: Bandai Games; NA/AU: Atari
True Crime: Streets of LA	2.08 million (Note: True Crime: Streets of LA sales breakdown: Japan – 25,695; United Kingdom – 300,000; United States – 1.76 million)	November 4, 2003	Action-adventure	Luxoflux	Activision
007: Agent Under Fire	2.07 million (Note: 007: Agent Under Fire sales breakdown: United Kingdom – 300,000; United States – 1.77 million)	November 13, 2001	First-person shooter	EA Redwood Shores	EA Games
Onimusha: Warlords	2.02 million	January 25, 2001	Action-adventure; hack and slash	Capcom	Capcom
Dragon Ball Z: Budokai Tenkaichi	2 million	October 6, 2005	Fighting	Funimation Entertainment	JP/EU: Bandai Games; NA/AU: Atari
ESPN NFL 2K5	2 million	July 20, 2004	Sports	Visual Concepts	Sega
Killzone	2 million	November 2, 2004	First-person shooter	Guerrilla Games	Sony Computer Entertainment
Pro Evolution Soccer 5 (Note: Known as World Soccer: Winning Eleven 9 in North America and Japan.)	2 million (Note: Pro Evolution Soccer 5 sales breakdown: Japan – 1,206,483; United Kingdom – 800,000+)	August 4, 2005	Sports	Konami	Konami
WWE SmackDown! vs. Raw	2 million	November 2, 2004	Sports	Yuke's	WW: THQ; JP: Yuke's
ATV Offroad Fury	1.99 million	February 5, 2001	Racing	Rainbow Studios	Sony Computer Entertainment
NBA Live 2005	1.98 million (Note: NBA Live 2005 sales breakdown: Japan – 30,013; United States – 1.95 million)	September 28, 2004	Sports	EA Canada	EA Sports
Midnight Club: Street Racing	1.97 million (Note: Midnight Club: Street Racing sales breakdown: Japan – 6,027; United Kingdom – 100,000; United States – 1.87 million)	October 26, 2000	Racing	Angel Studios	Rockstar Games
Spider-Man 2	1.93 million (Note: Spider-Man 2 sales breakdown: United Kingdom – 300,000; United States – 1.63 million)	June 28, 2004	Action-adventure	Treyarch	Activision
Madden NFL 08	1.9 million	August 14, 2007	Sports	EA Tiburon	EA Sports
Pro Evolution Soccer 6 (Note: Known as World Soccer: Winning Eleven 10 in Japan and Winning Eleven: Pro Evolution Soccer 2007 in North America.)	1.88 million (Note: Pro Evolution Soccer 6 sales breakdown: Japan – 1,289,073; United Kingdom – 600,000)	April 27, 2006	Sports	Konami	Konami
Hot Shots Golf Fore! (Note: Known in the PAL region as Everybody's Golf and in North America as Hot Shots Golf Fore!)	1.86 million (Note: Everybody's Golf 4 sales breakdown: Japan – 1,716,600; United States – 157,242)	November 27, 2003	Sports	Clap Hanz	Sony Computer Entertainment
Dragon Ball Z: Budokai 3	1.83 million (Note: Dragon Ball Z: Budokai 3 sales breakdown: Japan – 696,230; United States – 1.14 million)	November 16, 2004	Fighting	Dimps	JP/EU: Bandai Games; NA/AU: Atari
Dragon Quest V: Hand of the Heavenly Bride	1.811 million	March 25, 2004	Role-playing	ArtePiazza; Matrix Software	Square Enix
007: Nightfire	1.8 million (Note: James Bond 007: Nightfire sales breakdown: Japan – 108,795; United Kingdom – 300,000; United States – 1.4 million)	November 18, 2002	First-person shooter	Eurocom	EA Games
Ace Combat 5: The Unsung War	1.8 million	October 21, 2004	Combat flight simulator	Project Aces	Namco
Namco Museum	1.8 million	December 4, 2001	Compilation	Namco	Namco
ATV Offroad Fury 2	1.77 million	November 9, 2002	Racing	Rainbow Studios	NA: Sony Computer Entertainment; EU: THQ
Sonic Mega Collection Plus	1.74 million (Note: Sonic Mega Collection Plus sales breakdown: United Kingdom – 300,000; United States – 1.44 million)	November 2, 2004	Compilation	Sonic Team	Sega
WWE SmackDown! Shut Your Mouth	1.74 million (Note: WWE SmackDown! Shut Your Mouth sales breakdown: Japan – 63,027; United Kingdom – 300,000; United States – 1.38 million)	October 31, 2002	Sports	Yuke's	WW: THQ; JP: Yuke's
Call of Duty: Finest Hour	1.71 million (Note: Call of Duty: Finest Hour sales breakdown: Japan – 4,648; United Kingdom – 300,000; United States – 1.41 million)	November 16, 2004	First-person shooter	Spark Unlimited	Activision
NBA Street	1.71 million (Note: NBA Street sales breakdown: Japan – 13,416; United States – 1.7 million)	June 18, 2001	Sports	NuFX; EA Canada	EA Sports BIG
Devil May Cry 2	1.7 million (Note: Devil May Cry 2 sales breakdown: Japan – 456,824; United Kingdom – 100,000)	January 25, 2003	Action-adventure; hack and slash	Capcom	Capcom
Grand Theft Auto: Liberty City Stories	1.7 million (Note: Grand Theft Auto: Liberty City Stories sales breakdown: Japan – 82,248; United Kingdom – 300,000; United States – 1.32 million)	June 6, 2006	Action-adventure	Rockstar Leeds; Rockstar North	Rockstar Games
Mortal Kombat: Deadly Alliance	1.7 million	November 16, 2002	Fighting	Midway Games	Midway Games
Yakuza	1.7 million (Note: Yakuza sales breakdown: Japan – 883,179)	December 8, 2005	Action-adventure	Sega NE R&D	Sega
Virtua Fighter 4	1.68 million	January 31, 2002	Fighting	SEGA AM2	Sega
Enter the Matrix	1.61 million (Note: Enter the Matrix sales breakdown: Japan – 76,142; United Kingdom – 200,000; United States – 1.34 million)	May 14, 2003	Action-adventure; fighting	Shiny Entertainment	Infogrames
Need for Speed: Hot Pursuit 2	1.61 million	October 1, 2002	Racing	EA Black Box	EA Games
Jak II	1.6 million	October 14, 2003	Platform; third-person shooter; action-adventure	Naughty Dog	Sony Computer Entertainment
NBA Street Vol. 2	1.6 million	April 28, 2003	Sports	EA Canada	EA Sports BIG
WWE SmackDown! Here Comes the Pain	1.58 million (Note: WWE SmackDown! Here Comes the Pain sales breakdown: Japan – 45,547; United Kingdom – 300,000; United States – 1.24 million)	October 27, 2003	Sports	Yuke's	WW: THQ; JP: Yuke's
Gran Turismo Concept	1.56 million shipped (Note: Gran Turismo Concept sales breakdown: Asia – 560,000; Europe – 1 million)	January 1, 2002	Sim racing	Polyphony Digital	Sony Computer Entertainment
Dynasty Warriors 5	1.55 million	February 24, 2005	hack and slash	Omega Force	Koei
Guitar Hero	1.53 million	November 7, 2005	Music; rhythm	Harmonix	RedOctane
WWE SmackDown vs. Raw 2007	1.53 million (Note: WWE SmackDown vs. Raw 2007 sales breakdown: United Kingdom – 300,000; United States – 1.23 million)	November 10, 2006	Sports	Yuke's	THQ
Onimusha 3: Demon Siege	1.52 million	February 26, 2004	Action-adventure; hack and slash	Capcom	Capcom
Bratz: Rock Angelz	1.5 million	October 4, 2005	Adventure	Blitz Games	THQ
Bully	1.5 million	October 17, 2006	Action-adventure	Rockstar Vancouver	Rockstar Games
Samurai Warriors	1.5 million (Note: Samurai Warriors sales breakdown: Japan – 1.06 million; United States – 449,759)	February 11, 2004	Hack and slash	Omega Force	WW: Koei; EU: Electronic Arts
Tony Hawk's Underground 2	1.5 million (Note: Tony Hawk's Underground 2 sales breakdown: United Kingdom – 200,000; United States – 1.3 million)	October 4, 2004	Sports	Neversoft	Activision
NBA Live 2004	1.48 million (Note: NBA Live 2004 sales breakdown: Japan – 28,487; United States – 1.46 million)	October 14, 2003	Sports	EA Canada	EA Sports
WWF SmackDown! Just Bring It	1.48 million (Note: WWF SmackDown! Just Bring It sales breakdown: Japan – 76,393; United Kingdom – 300,000; United States – 1.11 million)	November 16, 2001	Sports	Yuke's	WW: THQ; JP: Yuke's
Disney•Pixar Finding Nemo	1.46 million (Note: Finding Nemo sales breakdown: Japan – 48,263; United Kingdom – 300,000; United States – 1.12 million)	May 9, 2003	Action-adventure	Traveller's Tales	THQ
Resident Evil Outbreak	1.45 million	December 11, 2003	Survival horror	Capcom Production Studio 1	Capcom
Yu-Gi-Oh! The Duelists of the Roses	1.44 million (Note: Yu-Gi-Oh! The Duelists of the Roses sales breakdown: Japan – 76,248; United States and Europe – 1.37 million)	September 6, 2001	Card battle	Konami	Konami
Tiger Woods PGA Tour 2004	1.43 million (Note: Tiger Woods PGA Tour 2004 sales breakdown: United Kingdom – 300,000; United States – 1.13 million)	September 22, 2003	Sports	EA Redwood Studios	EA Sports
Tony Hawk's Pro Skater 4	1.42 million (Note: Tony Hawk's Pro Skater 4 sales breakdown: United Kingdom – 200,000; United States – 1.22 million)	October 23, 2002	Sports	Neversoft	Activision O2
Hitman 2: Silent Assassin	1.41 million (Note: Hitman 2: Silent Assassin sales breakdown: Japan – 12,175; United Kingdom – 300,000; United States – 1.1 million)	October 1, 2002	Stealth	IO Interactive	Eidos Interactive
The Sims	1.41 million (Note: The Sims sales breakdown: Japan – 16,658; United Kingdom – 300,000; United States – 1.1 million)	January 14, 2003	Life simulation	Edge of Reality	EA Games
Gran Turismo 4 Prologue	1.4 million (Note: Gran Turismo 4 Prologue sales breakdown: Asia – 950,000; Europe – 450,000)	December 4, 2003	Sim racing	Polyphony Digital	Sony Computer Entertainment
Resident Evil – Code: Veronica X	1.4 million	March 22, 2001	Survival horror	Capcom Production Studio 4	Capcom
NCAA Football 06	1.39 million	July 11, 2005	Sports	EA Tiburon	EA Sports
Crazy Taxi	1.38 million (Note: Crazy Taxi sales breakdown: Japan – 13,075; United Kingdom – 300,000; United States – 1.07 million)	May 14, 2001	Racing; action	Hitmaker	Sega
LEGO Star Wars II: The Original Trilogy	1.38 million (Note: Lego Star Wars II: The Original Trilogy sales breakdown: United Kingdom – 300,000; United States – 1.08 million)	September 12, 2006	Action-adventure	Traveller's Tales	LucasArts
The Lord of the Rings: The Return of the King	1.37 million (Note: The Lord of the Rings: The Return of the King sales breakdown: Japan – 34,979; United Kingdom – 300,000; United States – 1.04 million)	November 5, 2003	Hack and slash; action role-playing	EA Redwood Shores	EA Games
Star Ocean: Till the End of Time	1.36 million (Note: Star Ocean: Till the End of Time sales breakdown: Europe – 90,000; Japan – 533,373; United States – 740,000)	August 31, 2004	Action role-playing	tri-Ace	Enix; Square Enix (Note: Square Enix published the Director's Cut version of Star Ocean: Till the End of Time.)
Burnout 3: Takedown	1.33 million (Note: Burnout 3: Takedown sales breakdown: Japan – 78,986; United Kingdom – 300,000; United States – 960,000)	September 7, 2004	Racing	Criterion Games	EA Games
Jak 3	1.33 million (Note: Jak 3 sales breakdown: United Kingdom – 100,000; United States – 1.23 million)	November 9, 2004	Platform; third-person shooter; action-adventure	Naughty Dog	Sony Computer Entertainment
NCAA Football 07	1.32 million	July 18, 2006	Sports	EA Tiburon	EA Sports
Tom Clancy's Ghost Recon	1.32 million (Note: Tom Clancy's Ghost Recon sales breakdown: Japan – 9,970; United States – 1.32 million)	December 1, 2002	Tactical shooter	Red Storm Entertainment	Ubi Soft
Soulcalibur II	1.31 million (Note: Soulcalibur II sales breakdown: Japan – 144,948; United Kingdom – 200,000; United States – 970,000)	March 27, 2003	Fighting	Project Soul	Namco
Shrek 2	1.3 million (Note: Shrek 2 sales breakdown: United Kingdom – 300,000; United States – 1 million)	April 28, 2004	Action-adventure	Luxoflux	Activision
Midnight Club II	1.28 million (Note: Midnight Club II sales breakdown: United Kingdom – 100,000; United States – 1.18 million)	April 9, 2003	Racing	Rockstar San Diego	Rockstar Games
NCAA Football 2004	1.28 million	July 16, 2003	Sports	EA Tiburon	EA Sports
NBA Live 06	1.27 million (Note: NBA Live 06 sales breakdown: Japan – 48,907; United States – 1.23 million)	September 26, 2005	Sports	EA Canada	EA Sports
NFL Blitz Pro	1.27 million	October 28, 2003	Sports	Midway Games	Midway Games
Shadow the Hedgehog	1.26 million	November 15, 2005	Platform	Sonic Team	Sega
Dirge of Cerberus: Final Fantasy VII	1.24 million (Note: Dirge of Cerberus: Final Fantasy VII sales breakdown: Europe – 270,000; Japan – 514,857; North America – 460,000)	January 26, 2006	Action role-playing; third-person shooter	Square Enix; Monolith Soft	Square Enix
Madden NFL 2001	1.23 million (Note: Madden NFL 2001 sales breakdown: Japan – 26,711; United States – 1.21 million)	October 26, 2000	Sports	EA Tiburon	NA/EU: EA Sports; JP: Electronic Arts Square
Scarface: The World Is Yours	1.22 million (Note: Scarface: The World Is Yours sales breakdown: United Kingdom – 200,000; United States – 1.02 million)	October 8, 2006	Action-adventure	Radical Entertainment	Vivendi Games
Pac-Man World 2	1.21 million	February 24, 2002	Platform	Namco Hometek	WW: Namco; EU: Sony Computer Entertainment
Dark Cloud	1.2 million shipped	December 14, 2000	Action role-playing	Level-5	Sony Computer Entertainment
NBA Live 2003	1.19 million (Note: NBA Live 2003 sales breakdown: Japan – 11,909; United States – 1.18 million)	October 8, 2002	Sports	EA Canada	EA Sports
ESPN NBA 2K5	1.19 million	September 30, 2004	Sports	Visual Concepts	Sega
Scooby-Doo! Night of 100 Frights	1.17 million (Note: Scooby-Doo! Night of 100 Frights sales breakdown: United Kingdom – 100,000; United States – 1.07 million)	May 20, 2002	Platform	Heavy Iron Studios	THQ
Tom Clancy's Splinter Cell	1.17 million (Note: Tom Clancy's Splinter Cell sales breakdown: Japan – 10,784; United Kingdom – 300,000; United States – 867,914)	March 28, 2003	Stealth	Ubi Soft Shanghai	Ubi Soft
Jissen Pachi-Slot Hisshoho! Hokuto no Ken	1.15 million (Note: Includes Jissen Pachi-Slot Hisshoho! Hokuto no Ken Plus.)	May 27, 2004	Pachinko	Sammy Corporation	Sammy Corporation
MVP Baseball 2005	1.14 million	February 22, 2005	Sports	EA Canada	EA Sports
Twisted Metal: Black	1.12 million	June 18, 2001	Vehicular combat	Incognito Entertainment	Sony Computer Entertainment
Fight Night 2004	1.1 million (Note: Fight Night 2004 sales breakdown: United Kingdom – 100,000; United States – 1 million)	April 5, 2004	Sports	EA Canada; NuFX	EA Sports
Midnight Club 3: DUB Edition	1.1 million (Note: Midnight Club 3: Dub Edition sales breakdown: United Kingdom – 100,000; United States – 1 million)	April 11, 2005	Racing	Rockstar San Diego	Rockstar Games
DDRMAX2 Dance Dance Revolution 7thMix	1.09 million	September 23, 2003	Music; exergaming	Konami	Konami
SpyHunter	1.07 million	September 24, 2001	Vehicular combat	Paradigm Entertainment	Midway Games
Naruto: Ultimate Ninja 2	1.06 million (Note: Naruto: Ultimate Ninja 2 sales breakdown: Japan – 403,000; North America and Western Europe – 660,000)	September 30, 2004	Fighting	CyberConnect2	JP: Bandai; NA/EU/AU: Namco Bandai Games
Harry Potter and the Chamber of Secrets	1.04 million (Note: Harry Potter and the Chamber of Secrets sales breakdown: Japan – 46,855; United Kingdom – 300,000; United States – 700,000)	November 14, 2002	Action-adventure	EA UK	EA Games
The Incredibles	1.04 million (Note: The Incredibles sales breakdown: United Kingdom – 300,000; United States – 740,000)	October 31, 2004	Action-adventure	Heavy Iron Studios	THQ
MVP Baseball 2004	1.02 million	March 9, 2004	Sports	EA Canada	EA Sports
Disney•Pixar Cars	1.01 million (Note: Cars (video game) sales breakdown: * United States – 1.01 million)	June 6, 2006	Action-adventure; Racing	Rainbow Studios	THQ
Dead or Alive 2	1 million	March 30, 2000	Fighting	Team Ninja	Tecmo
Guitar Hero Encore: Rocks the 80s	1 million (Note: Sales data only reported for North America and Western Europe.)	July 24, 2007	Music; rhythm	Harmonix	Activision
NCAA Football 2003	1 million	July 20, 2002	Sports	EA Tiburon	EA Sports
Silent Hill 2	1 million	September 24, 2001	Survival horror	Konami Computer Entertainment Tokyo (Team Silent)	Konami
Sly Cooper and the Thievius Raccoonus	1 million	September 23, 2002	Platform; stealth	Sucker Punch Productions	Sony Computer Entertainment
Xenosaga Episode I: Der Wille zur Macht	1 million	February 28, 2002	Role-playing	Monolith Soft	Namco

== See also ==
- List of PlayStation 2 games (A–K)
- List of PlayStation 2 games (L–Z)
