= Golf 2 =

Golf 2 or Golf II may refer to:

== Vehicles ==
- Volkswagen Golf Mk2, a car
- Golf II, a type of Golf-class submarine

== Video games ==
- Actua Golf 2
- Everybody's Golf 2
- Everybody's Golf Portable 2
- The second version of Outlaw Golf
- Super Swing Golf: Season 2
