= Everybody's Golf Hot Shots =

- Developer: Hyde
- Publisher: Bandai Namco Entertainment
- Platforms: Nintendo Switch; PlayStation 5; Windows
- Release: JP: September 4, 2025; WW: September 5, 2025
- Genre: Sports
- Modes: Single-player, multiplayer

Everybody's Golf Hot Shots is a golf video game developed by Hyde and published by Bandai Namco Entertainment. The game was released for the Nintendo Switch, PlayStation 5, and Windows. It is the first entry in the long-running Everybody's Golf series in eight years, following Everybody's Golf (2017), and the first to be developed by Hyde instead of long-time developer Clap Hanz.

== Gameplay ==
Everybody's Golf Hot Shots is a video game simulation of the sport of golf. The game feature's the series' usual "three button press" setup for controlling golf swings to help determine distance and trajectory of the ball. In addition to being able to play a standard game of golf, the game also features a "Wacky Golf" mode that features unconventional alternate elements as well, such as extra obstacles to aim for, or try to avoid, such as tornados or monoliths. Dynamic weather and day-to-night systems also affect gameplay. Over 10 golf courses and 25 golfers can be unlocked as playable characters, with new features unlocking as characters are repeatedly used. Local multiplayer with up to 4 players is possible on one system, and online multiplayer is also available.

== Development ==
The game was first announced in March 2025 in a Nintendo Direct presentation. Its name - Everybody's Golf Hot Shots - alludes to the franchise's multiple names in the past; while the games were generally titled Everybody's Golf in most regions, most previous entries were rebranded Hot Shots Golf in North America. The game was announced for the Nintendo Switch, PlayStation 5, and a PC release via Windows. The Switch release surprised some publications, as all previous entries had released exclusively on Sony's brand of PlayStation consoles. However, prior entries had generally been published by Sony Interactive Entertainment, whereas Everybody's Golf Hot Shots, through a licensing agreement with Sony, would be published by Bandai Namco. The change in publisher also led to a change in the development team, with the game being developed by Bandai Namco's Hyde, as previous developer Clap Hanz had moved on to develop and release their own self-published golf game Easy Come Easy Golf. The game is the fourth previously Sony-published game coming to competitor Nintendo's platform, following Freedom Wars Remastered, Patapon 1+2 Replay, and Lego Horizon Adventures. It was released on September 4, 2025, in Japan and the following day worldwide. Customers who pre-ordered the game received Bandai Namco's Pac-Man as an automatically unlocked playable character.

== Reception ==
=== Pre-release ===
Some publications noted concern and disappointment regarding the disclosure that the game utilized AI-generated images, though its use is limited to "leaf and tree textures" on the golf courses. Kotaku conceded that, in watching its pre-release game trailer, that the trees and leaves didn't look AI generated, though they did look "ambiently junky". A lack of a Nintendo Switch 2 version of the game was also lamented.

=== Post-release ===
Reception

Aggregate scores
Aggregator	Score
Metacritic	(NS) 66/100 (PS5) 72/100 (PC) 66/100
OpenCritic	52% recommend

The Nintendo Switch, PlayStation 5, and PC versions of Everybody's Golf Hot Shots all received "mixed or average" reviews from critics, according to the review aggregation website Metacritic. Fellow review aggregator OpenCritic assessed that the game received fair approval, being recommended by 52% of critics.

== See also ==
- Clap Hanz Golf
