= Doko Demo Issyo =

Video game series

- Genre: Virtual pet
- Developers: BeXide Inc. Japan Studio; Jungle; Gemdrops
- Publishers: Sony Interactive Entertainment; ForwardWorks
- Platforms: PlayStation, PlayStation 2, PlayStation Portable, PlayStation 3, PlayStation Vita, PlayStation 4, Android, iOS,
- First release: Doko Demo Issyo; July 22, 1999
- Latest release: Toro and Friends: Onsen Town; October 1, 2019

Doko Demo Issyo (どこでもいっしょ; lit. "Together Everywhere") (Note: The series is sometimes abbreviated as どこいつ (Doko Itsu).) is a Japanese video game series primarily developed by BeXide Inc. (formerly Bomber eXpress) and published by Sony Interactive Entertainment. The first game was released for the PlayStation in 1999. In the games, players talk to, feed, photograph, and play minigames with characters.

Following the first game's commercial success, series character Toro Inoue became the principal identifying character of the wider series, though most of its games have only seen release in Japan. Sony would use Toro as a mascot for the PlayStation brand in Japan. He has appeared in later games, interactive news services, PlayStation advertising, public events and crossovers with other game franchises.

== History ==
Doko Demo Issyo is a long-running series in Japan, where it has seen commercial success. The games feature "pokepi" (short for "pocket people"), characters which the player interacts with through a variety of virtual pet mechanics and minigames (e.g. talking, feeding, sleeping, photography). A major reocurring feature is to teach the pokepi words to memorize. Most games feature some type of networking features to communicate with other players by sharing "business cards" or other data.

The first game in the series, Doko Demo Issyo, was released on 22 July 1999 for the PlayStation. It was possible to put transfer pokepi onto the PocketStation and interact with them on the device. The game sold over 1.1 million copies. Sony released two bonus discs that added more gameplay: Koneko mo Issyo featured younger versions of the pokepi, and Modo mo Issyo had cell phone connectivity features.

The series has touched on a variety of genres. On PlayStation 2, Watashina Ehon allows the player to make picture books, and Toro to Nagareboshi is more akin to an adventure game. On PlayStation Portable, Rettsu Gakkou! has the player learning trivia and playing minigames. By using the PSP's network functions, the player could download new lessons distributed every two weeks.

On PlayStation Vita, Toro's Friend Network creates avatars and a visualization of the player's PlayStation Network friends, allowing them to interact with the avatars in different 3D environments.

== Toro Inoue ==
The player interacts with Toro in Doko Demo Issyo (1999, PlayStation).

One of the characters introduced in the first game, Toro Inoue, became increasingly central to the series after the original release. Toro is depicted as a small, highly stylised white cat with an upright posture and an expressive face. In the original Doko Demo Issyo, he is one of five Pokepi—an abbreviation of "pocket people"—whom the player can select as a virtual companion. The player teaches the chosen Pokepi words, plays minigames with them and can transfer them to a PocketStation for interactions away from the console.

Koneko Mo Issyo depicted younger versions of the Pokepi, while later PlayStation 2 titles placed Toro in more conventional leading roles. In Toro to Kyuujitsu, he accompanies the player on a holiday through locations filmed in live action; Toro to Nagareboshi presents him as the player's companion in an adventure narrative; and Toro to Ippai introduces numerous black cats, including Kuro. Later entries frequently pair Toro with Kuro, who acts as Toro's companion and comic foil. The two became recurring co-hosts of the series' news and entertainment software. Toro's official birthday is May 6, which Sony and series developer BeXide have marked through public celebrations in Japan.

Toro's popularity would lead to the character being used prominently in Japanese PlayStation advertising. Official U.S. PlayStation Magazine contrasted this strategy with Sony Computer Entertainment America's reluctance to select a single permanent mascot for the North American market. On several occasions, Sony Interactive Entertainment Inc. (Japan) and series developer BeXide have held public "birthday parties" for Toro featuring food, charities, and raffles. In 2023, Famitsu covered the return of Toro's public birthday celebration after a four-year absence. Its report described an audience comprising long-time adult fans and families with children, with Toro and Kuro appearing together throughout the event.

The character has also been used as a costume or visual reference in other games. A Toro costume for Sackboy was released as downloadable content for LittleBigPlanet, with Wired describing Toro as the mascot of the Mainichi Issho series. A costume based on Toro was also produced for Pascal in the Japanese version of Tales of Graces f. Toro also appears as a DLC character in Everybody's Golf 5 and Everybody's Golf 6.

== Games ==
Year	Title	Original platform	Notes
1999	どこでもいっしょ: Doko Demo Issyo	PlayStation	Original game released for the PlayStation. A remake was released for the PlayStation Portable in 2004. Two bonus discs, requiring the original game to play, were released in the following years with additional content: Koneko Mo Issyo ～Doko Demo Issyo Tsuika Disc～ (こねこもいっしょ～どこでもいっしょ追加ディスク～) (2000); i-Modo Mo Issyo ～Doko Demo Issyo Tsuika Disc～ (ｉモードもいっしょ ～どこでもいっしょ追加ディスク～) (2001)
2001	トロと休日: Toro to Kyuujitsu	PlayStation 2	
2002	トロとタイピング: Toro to Typing	Windows	A licensed PC-based typing game where the user inputs Japanese characters with a keyboard to have varying conversations with Pokepi.
2003	-どこでもいっしょ- 私なえほん: -Doko Demo Issyo- Watashina Ehon	PlayStation 2	
2003	-温泉もいっしょ: Onsen mo Issho	Windows	Another PC-based typing game, sequel to Toro to Typing.
2004	-どこでもいっしょ- トロと流れ星: -Doko Demo Issyo- Toro to Nagareboshi	PlayStation 2	
2004	-どこでもいっしょ- トロといっぱい: -Doko Demo Issyo- Toro to Ippai	PlayStation 2	
2004	-どこでもいっしょ: -Doko Demo Issyo Portable	PlayStation Portable	Remake of the original PlayStation Doko Demo Issyo game.
2006	-どこでもいっしょ- レッツ学校!: -Doko Demo Issyo- Rettsu Gakkou!	PlayStation Portable	An abbreviated version was released in 2007 subtitled "Training edition".
2006	まいにちいっしょ: Mainichi Issyo	PlayStation 3, PlayStation Portable	PSP version titled "Mainichi Issyo Portable". Service ended in 2009.
2008	みんニャのパターGOLF: Minnya no Patā GOLF	PlayStation 3	Crossover with Everybody's Golf series.
2009	週刊トロ・ステーション: Weekly Toro Station	PlayStation 3, PlayStation Portable	Service ended in 2013.
2009	トロともりもり: Toro! Let's Party!	PlayStation 3	
2011	みんなといっしょ: Toro's Friend Network	PlayStation Vita	Could play Shuukan Toro Station inside Toro's Friend Network in Japan. Service ended in 2015.
2017	Japan Studio VR Music Festival	PlayStation 4	PlayStation VR game. It features Toro and Kuro. Only available for a limited time.
2019	トロとパズル: Toro and Friends: Onsen Town	Android, iOS	Match-three puzzle game. Service ended in 2021.

== Cultural impact and legacy ==
Famitsu stated that Toro rapidly became famous after the original Doko Demo Issyo, whose combination of conversation mechanics and PocketStation support distinguished it from other virtual-pet games of the period. Official U.S. PlayStation Magazine identified Toro as a heavily used Japanese mascot whose image appeared across a variety of promotional campaigns and marketing materials like billboards and television commercials.

By 2004, Rob Fahey of Gamesindustry.biz wrote that Toro was "firmly established as a cultural icon in the Far East" as PlayStation's mascot. Japanese retrospective coverage has continued to treat Toro as the principal figure associated with Doko Demo Issyo, including coverage surrounding the series' twenty-first anniversary and the later mobile revival.

The continuation of public birthday events for Toro, more than two decades after his debut, has also been cited as evidence of the character's longevity. Famitsu emphasized the broad age range attending the 2023 event and presented Toro as a character capable of appealing both to people who had followed the series since the original PlayStation and to younger families.
