= Everybody's Golf (1997 video game) =

1997 golf video game

- European cover art
- Developer: Camelot Software Planning (Note: Additional work by Sony Computer Entertainment Japan.)
- Publisher: Sony Computer Entertainment
- Director: Masashi Muramori
- Producers: Shugo Takahashi; Yasuhide Kobayashi
- Composer: Motoi Sakuraba
- Series: Everybody's Golf
- Platform: PlayStation
- Release: JP: 17 July 1997; NA: 5 May 1998; EU: 12 June 1998
- Genre: Sports
- Modes: Single-player, multiplayer

Everybody's Golf, released in North America as Hot Shots Golf and in Japan as Minna no Golf, (Note: Japanese: みんなのGOLF(ゴルフ), Hepburn: Minna no Gorufu; lit. "Everybody's Golf") is a 1997 golf video game developed by Camelot Software Planning and published by Sony Computer Entertainment for the PlayStation. It is the first game in the Everybody's Golf series and the only one to be developed by Camelot, who would later develop the Mario Golf series for Nintendo; Clap Hanz would develop later installments starting with Everybody's Golf 2.

== Gameplay ==
Players can acquire additional golfers for use by defeating them in VS mode, with a total of ten golfers available.

== Reception ==
Reception

Aggregate score
Aggregator	Score
GameRankings	82%

Review scores
Publication	Score
AllGame	4.5/5
CNET Gamecenter	8/10
Edge	7/10
Electronic Gaming Monthly	8.25/10
Famitsu	30/40
Game Informer	9/10
GameFan	93% (Note: In GameFan's viewpoint of the game, one critic gave it a score of 93, and the other 92.)
GameRevolution	B+
GameSpot	8.3/10
IGN	8/10
Next Generation	4/5
PlayStation Official Magazine – UK	9/10
Official U.S. PlayStation Magazine	4/5
PlayStation: The Official Magazine	4/5
Dengeki PlayStation	75/100, 95/100, 85/100, 85/100

The game received mostly favorable reviews, and held an 82% on the review aggregation website GameRankings. Critics overwhelmingly remarked that the game is extremely accessible, even to newcomers to golf, while holding enough depth and realism to keep experienced players engaged. Critics also often praised the cartoony graphics, the way the camera tracks the ball's flight, the numerous secrets, and the 18-hole mini golf game.

Kraig Kujawa of Electronic Gaming Monthly remarked, "The controls are very intuitive while offering the extra nuances that advanced players seek in golf games." Next Generation called Everybody's Golf "the type of golf game that's sure to liven up any PlayStation party and be enjoyed by gamers and golf fans alike." IGN opined that the system of using points to unlock characters and courses gives the game challenge and depth, since it forces players to master courses before moving on. GamePro criticized the short length and lack of licensing, and concluded that experienced players would find Everybody's Golf falls short of PGA Tour 98, but said, "Lacking name recognition or even normal-sized players, Hot Shots Golf may at first seem destined for the bin marked 'mediocre.' But this fun, challenging golf game has an engine that the pros would be proud of and all the makings of a legendary link-splitter." (Note: GamePro gave the game three 4.5/5 scores for graphics, control, and fun factor, and 4.0/5 for sound.) GameSpot called it "a game that looks good, is easy to play, and is difficult to master."

Game Informer ranked it as the 87th best game made for their 100th issue in August 2001 despite past criticisms that it was not a golf simulator. They praised it for its balance between simplicity and complexity.

According to Famitsu, the game was Japan's sixth-best-selling game of 1997, with sales of 1.02 million units.

The game was a finalist by the Academy of Interactive Arts & Sciences for "Console Sports Game of the Year" during the 2nd Annual Interactive Achievement Awards, which was ultimately given to 1080° Snowboarding. The game won the award for "Best Sports Game" at the 1998 OPM Editors' Awards, and was nominated for the "Best Multiplayer Game" award, which went to Devil Dice.
