= PocketStation =

PlayStation Memory Card and PDA by Sony

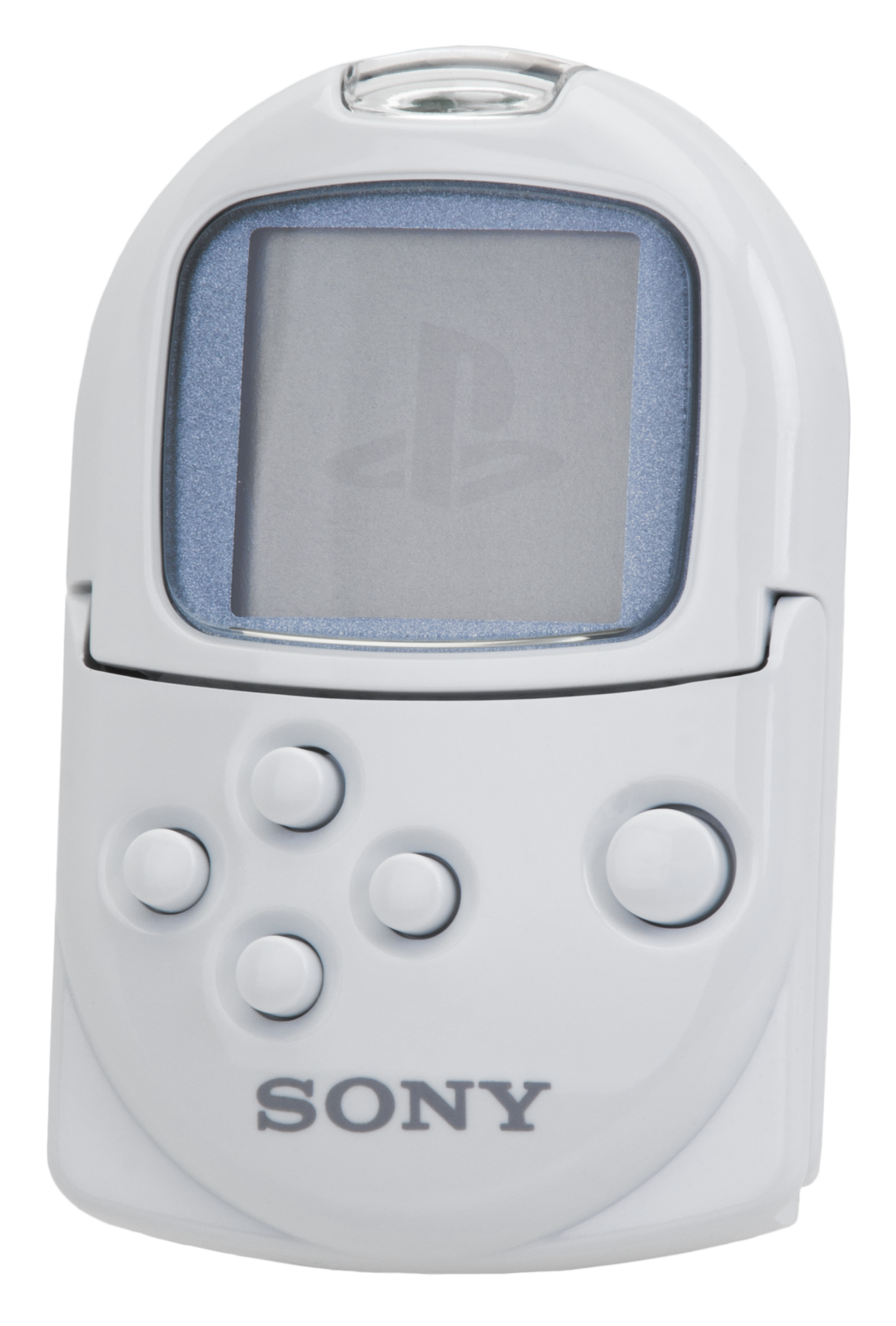
- Developer: Sony Computer Entertainment
- Manufacturer: Sony Corporation
- Product family: PlayStation
- Type: Peripheral, handheld game console
- Generation: Fifth
- Released: JP: January 23, 1999
- Lifespan: 1999–2002
- Discontinued: JP: July 2002
- Media: PlayStation 1; PlayStation 2; CD-ROM (used for content transfer); PlayStation 3
- CPU: ARM7T (32 bit RISC processor)
- Memory: 2 KB
- Input: 5× Digital buttons
- Connectivity: IrDA
- Power: 1 CR-2032 lithium battery
- Dimensions: 64 mm × 42 mm × 13.5 mm (2.52 in × 1.65 in × 0.53 in)
- Weight: 30 grams (1.06 oz)
- Successor: PlayStation Portable

The PocketStation is a memory card peripheral by Sony Computer Entertainment for the PlayStation home video game console. It was released as a Japan-only console in 1999, though there were plans to produce it abroad. The device acted not only as a memory card but was interactive itself via a small monochrome LCD and buttons on its case. Many PlayStation games included software that could be downloaded and played on the PocketStation. A release in Europe and North America was planned but was ultimately canceled. The PocketStation shares similarities with Sega's VMU for the Dreamcast.

== History ==
The PocketStation was revealed at E3 1998 under the codename PDA (Personal Digital Assistant). It was released exclusively in Japan on January 23, 1999. The original Japanese ship date for the PocketStation was set for December 23, 1998, but it was delayed a full month to January 23 due to production issues coming from the massive demand of the console. Sony had fell short of its target of 1 million units per month, and only shipped an initial 60,000 units of the peripheral when it was released. It was initially available in two case colors: white and clear.

It proved extremely popular, selling out all over the region. Sony planned to release the PocketStation outside Japan, engaging in promotional activity in Europe and North America, but the release did not occur. SCEA cited an inability to meet Japanese demand as the reason for the PocketStation's absence. Despite this, a few games, such as Final Fantasy VIII and SaGa Frontier 2, retained PocketStation functionality in their localized versions.

On November 5, 2013, it was announced that the PocketStation would be revived as an application for the PlayStation Vita, allowing users to play PocketStation format minigames for any classic PlayStation games that they own. Originally only available to PlayStation Plus members, it was later released to the general public. It remains an exclusive to the Japanese PlayStation Vita.

== Hardware ==
Categorized by Sony as a combination of a Memory Card and a miniature personal digital assistant, the device features a monochrome liquid crystal display (LCD), infrared communication capability, a real-time clock, built-in flash memory, and sound capability. To use the device's memory card functionality, it must be connected to a PlayStation through a memory card slot.

=== Technical specifications ===
- CPU: ARM7T (32-bit RISC chip variable clock, max 7.995 MHz)
- Memory: 2 KB SRAM, 128 KB Flash RAM (via the PlayStation memory card)
- Screen: 32×32 dot monochrome LCD
- Sound: 1 miniature speaker (10-bit PCM)
- Switches: 5 input buttons, 1 reset button
- Infrared communication: bi-directional (supports IrDA based and conventional remote control systems)
- LED indicator: 1 (red)
- Battery: 1 CR-2032 lithium battery
- Other functions: calendar function, memory card and identification number.
- Dimensions: 64 × 42 × 13.5 mm (height × width × depth)
- Weight: approximately 30 g (including battery)
- Available colors: White, Crystal/Clear, Black (Japanese Yu-Gi-Oh! Forbidden Memories Limited Edition), Crystal/Clear Yellow, Crystal/Clear Violet, Crystal/Clear Pink (Tokimeki Memorial 2 Limited Edition), Crystal/Clear Black, Crystal/Clear Blue, Light Blue

== Software ==
Software for the PocketStation was typically distributed as extras for PlayStation games, included in the CD-ROM, enhancing the games with added features. Standalone software could also be downloaded through the PlayStation console onto a memory card, then transferred to the PocketStation for use. A built-in infrared data interface allows direct transfer of data such as game saves between PocketStation units, as well as multiplayer gaming. The PocketStation's most popular game was Doko Demo Issyo, which sold over 1.5 million copies in Japan and is the first game to star Sony's mascot Toro. The PocketStation was discontinued in July 2002 after having shipped nearly five million units.

=== Compatible PlayStation games ===
- All Japan Pro Wrestling
- Ape Escape
- Arc the Lad III
- Armored Core: Master of Arena
- Battle Bug Story
- Be Pirates!
- Boku wa Koukuu Kanseikan
- Brightis
- Burger Burger 2
- Chaos Break
- Chocobo Stallion
- Crash Bandicoot 3: Warped
- Dance Dance Revolution 3rdMix
- Dance Dance Revolution 4thMix
- Dance Dance Revolution 5thMix
- Devil Summoner: Soul Hackers
- Digimon Tamers: Pocket Culumon
- Dokodemo Hamster 2
- Doko Demo Issyo
- Final Fantasy VIII
- Fire Pro G
- Fish Hunter
- Fun! Fun! Pingu
- Gallop Racer 3
- Grandia
- Harvest Moon: Back to Nature
- Hello Kitty: White Present
- Hot Shots Golf 2
- I.Q. Final
- Jade Cocoon: Story of the Tamamayu
- JoJo's Bizarre Adventure
- Kero Kero King
- Koneko mo Issho
- Kyro-chan's Print Club
- The Legend of Dragoon
- Legend of Mana
- LMA Manager
- Love Hina 2
- Lunatic Dawn 3
- Medarot R Parts Collection
- Metal Gear Solid: Integral
- Mister Prospector
- The Misadventures of Tron Bonne
- Monster Complete World
- Monster Race
- Monster Farm 2
- Paqa
- Pi to Mail
- Pocket Digimon World
  - Pocket Digimon World: Cool & Nature Battle Disc
  - Pocket Digimon World: Wind Battle Disc
- Pocket Dungeon
- Pocke-Kano Yumi
- Pocket Family: Happy Family Plan
- Pocket MuuMuu
- Pocket Tuner
- Pocketan
- Pokeler
- Pokeler DX Black
- Pokeler DX Pink
- Pop'n Music 2
- Pop'n Music 3 Append Disc
- Pop'n Music 4 Append Disc
- PoPoRogue
- Prologue
- Purumui Purumui
- Racing Lagoon
- RayCrisis (Japanese version)
- Remote Control Dandy
- R4: Ridge Racer Type 4
- Rival Schools 2 (Shiritsu Justice Gakuen Nekketsu Seisyun Nikki 2)
- Rockman Complete Works
- SaGa Frontier 2
- Samurai Shodown : Warriors Rage 2
- Shop Keeper
- Sno Pokeler
- Spyro the Dragon
- Spyro 2: Ripto's Rage!
- Street Fighter Alpha 3
- Super Robot Wars Alpha
- Tales of Eternia
- Taregoro: Tarepanda no Iru Nichijō
- Theme Aquarium
- Tokimeki Memorial 2
- World Neverland 2
- World Stadium 3
- Yu-Gi-Oh! Forbidden Memories

== See also ==
- VMU, a similar accessory for the Sega Dreamcast console (which was released 6 months earlier, on July 30, 1998, in Japan)
