= Golf 3 =

Golf 3 could refer to:

- Volkswagen Golf Mk3, a car
- Actua Golf 3, a video game
- Everybody's Golf 3, a video game
- Golf III, a type of Golf-class submarine
