= Everybody's Golf Portable =

2004 video game

- Japanese cover art
- Developer: Clap Hanz (Note: Additional work by Sony Computer Entertainment Japan)
- Publisher: Sony Computer Entertainment
- Series: Everybody's Golf
- Platform: PlayStation Portable
- Release: JP: 12 December 2004; NA: 3 May 2005; PAL: 1 September 2005
- Genre: Sports
- Modes: Single-player, multiplayer

Everybody's Golf Portable, (Note: Japanese: みんなのGOLF(ゴルフ)ポータブル, Hepburn: Minna no Gorufu Pōtaburu) released in PAL regions as Everybody's Golf and North America as Hot Shots Golf: Open Tee, is a golf video game developed by Clap Hanz and published by Sony Computer Entertainment for the PlayStation Portable. It is the fifth game in the Everybody's Golf series. The game was a launch title for the PlayStation Portable both in Japan and PAL regions. It was followed up by Everybody's Golf Portable 2.

== Gameplay ==
Everybody's Golf Portable is a golf game that emphasizes arcade-like gameplay over real life accuracy or locations. The game features all fictional characters and courses. It features several different modes, including a training mode to learn the game, simple match play, and a challenge mode feature many golf tournaments and unlockable items used to customizes the player's golfer.

== Reception ==
Reception

Aggregate score
Aggregator	Score
Metacritic	81/100

Review scores
Publication	Score
Computer Games Magazine	4.5/5
Electronic Gaming Monthly	7/10
Eurogamer	8/10
Famitsu	33/40
Game Informer	9/10
GameRevolution	B−
GameSpot	7.8/10
GameSpy	5/5
GameZone	8.8/10
IGN	8.8/10
Official U.S. PlayStation Magazine	4/5
Pocket Gamer	4/5
Detroit Free Press	2/4
The Sydney Morning Herald	4/5

The game received "favourable" reviews according to the review aggregation website Metacritic. Praise was given to its art style and simple but effective game mechanics. IGN said: "Open Tee is easy to fall in love with. Sometimes you'll shout for joy, other times you'll curse in frustration. But it's all Hot Shots golfing, and this is one of the most spectacular golfing games out there". In Japan, Famitsu gave it a score of one eight, one nine, and two eights for a total of 33 out of 40.
