= Everybody's Golf 5 =

2007 video game

- Japanese cover art
- Developer: Clap Hanz (Note: Additional work by Japan Studio)
- Publisher: Sony Computer Entertainment
- Director: Hiroyuki Yagi
- Producer: Masashi Muramori
- Designer: Masashi Muramori
- Composer: Gon Ohtsuji
- Series: Everybody's Golf
- Platform: PlayStation 3
- Release: JP: 26 July 2007; NA: 18 March 2008; AU: 27 March 2008; EU: 28 March 2008
- Genre: Sports
- Modes: Single-player, multiplayer

Everybody's Golf 5, (Note: Japanese: みんなのGOLF(ゴルフ) 5, Hepburn: Minna no Gorufu 5) known in the PAL region as Everybody's Golf: World Tour, and in North America as Hot Shots Golf: Out of Bounds, is a sports video game developed by Clap Hanz and published by Sony Computer Entertainment for the PlayStation 3. It is the seventh game in the Everybody's Golf series, serving as the sequel to Everybody's Golf 4, and the first to be released for the PlayStation 3. Developed by Clap Hanz, it was released in Japan on 26 July 2007 to commemorate the 10th anniversary of the series' debut. Additionally, the game was sold in bundle deals with the PlayStation 3 in Japan. It was released overseas in March 2008; the North American release has mild censorship, replacing the panties of the female players with biking shorts. It was followed by Everybody's Golf 6 / Hot Shots Golf: World Invitational (2011).

== Gameplay ==
Showing off the new shot system.

Everybody's Golf 5 introduces a modified version of the "3 click" shot system. Instead of relying completely on the gauge at the bottom to estimate the strength and slice of the shot, the new system encourages you to use the actual character's golf swing to select the power. Once the strength of the shot is determined, the gauge disappears, and the accuracy of the shot relies on the player's timing when the club hits the ball.

Initially, there are six courses in the game, five beginner characters, five intermediate characters, five advanced players, and seven caddies. Shigeki Maruyama became the second real-life golfer to become a playable character and caddy.

There is a challenge mode where you compete in various tournaments and against other computer controlled players to increase your ranking and unlock various items.

The game has had a large graphical overhaul, with nearly every visual aspect becoming more detailed and realistic.

PlayStation Move support was added to the Japanese version of the game in September 2011, and support for English language versions was added on 23 February 2012.

=== Downloadable content ===
In May 2008, two additional characters, Alex and Gloria, were made available for purchase from the PlayStation Store in Europe and North America. On 19 June, an additional course, Oceania Resort Course, was made available for purchase from the PlayStation Store in Europe and North America. In 21 August, the character Kratos from the God of War series was made available as a playable character. In March 2009, Sackboy from the LittleBigPlanet series was made available as a playable character. Other DLC for the game included Toro Inoue as a playable character and the Golfasaurus-Rex course as well.

== PlayStation Home ==
Everybody's Golf 5 is one of the few games that fully supported game launching in PlayStation Home, the PlayStation 3's online community-based service. With full support game launching, users were able to set up a multiplayer match in Home with advanced options. After they have set up their match, other users could join them or vice versa and then launch into the game directly from Home. The game launching feature had access in the dedicated game space for the Everybody's Golf series in Home.

== Reception ==
Reception

Aggregate score
Aggregator	Score
Metacritic	81/100

Review scores
Publication	Score
Destructoid	9/10
Eurogamer	8/10
Famitsu	36/40
Game Informer	8/10
GamePro	4.5/5
GameRevolution	B
GameSpot	7.5/10
GameSpy	4/5
GameTrailers	7.6/10
GameZone	8.8/10
Giant Bomb	3/5
IGN	8.9/10
PlayStation: The Official Magazine	4/5
The Sydney Morning Herald	4/5
Wired	7/10

The game received "favourable" reviews according to the review aggregation website Metacritic.

Chris Roper of IGN wrote: "Hot Shots Golf: Out of Bounds is a tremendously fun golf game, one that should appease either casual or hardcore golf fans. It's an arcadey approach to the sport, for sure, but there's still a good deal of depth in the game that'll give veteran players plenty to work with. There could have been more courses, and the lack of voice support online is somewhat disappointing, but the overall package is a ton of fun and definitely worth picking up." Aaron Thomas of GameSpot wrote: "The Hot Shots Golf series has changed very little during the past 10 years, but there's no question that while still good, this is a franchise in need of a shot in the arm -- or at the very least, more courses. But that said, the new swing and robust online play freshen things up just enough to make it worth getting a tee time with Hot Shots Golf: Out of Bounds." Reviewing the Japanese version, Dave McCarthy of Eurogamer wrote: "In spite of the fact that all you're doing is pressing a button three times, over and over again, it never gets boring. It would probably be too controversial to call it the best golf game, or the best PS3 game. But on both counts it's a remarkably close call." In Japan, Famitsu gave it a score of all four nines for a total of 36 out of 40.

Mark Salmela of 411Mania gave it a score of 8.8 out of 10, calling it "a great addition to the franchise" and "a solid addition to the PS3 library." Gus Mastrapa of The A.V. Club gave it a B+, saying that the game "appeals to the stat nerd without sucking every last bit of joy out of the affair." Maxim gave it a score of four stars out of five, saying, "If you own a PS3 and haven't played a Hot Shots Golf game prior to this—it's the fifth game in the series—well, today's your lucky day, asshole. The notoriously lo-fi series gets a Blu-ray makeover, but still winds up somehow looking very much like its last-gen counterparts." Jason Hill of The Sydney Morning Herald gave it four out of five, saying, "The wonderfully accessible swing system, the delightful Japanese golfers, the ever-cheerful and encouraging caddies, the gorgeous courses and the chance to play at your own pace combine to ensure this is indeed a game everybody can enjoy."

Stuart Andrews of The Times gave it a favourable review, saying, "The odd style of Everybody's Golf has been known to put off serious golfers, but beneath the cute-looking surface, this series has always played an excellent game." However, Earnest Cavalli of Wired gave it seven stars out of ten, saying that the game "retains what fans love about the series and refuses to make any drastic changes. Long time fans will be absolutely ecstatic at this news, but for those of you who never got the appeal of Hot Shots in the first place, you certainly won't find it here."
