= Everybody's Golf 4 =

2003 video game

- Japanese cover art
- Developer: Clap Hanz (Note: Additional work by Sony Computer Entertainment Japan)
- Publisher: Sony Computer Entertainment
- Series: Everybody's Golf
- Platform: PlayStation 2
- Release: JP: 27 November 2003; NA: 17 August 2004; EU: 23 September 2005; AU: 29 September 2005
- Genre: Sports
- Modes: Single-player, multiplayer

Everybody's Golf 4, (Note: Japanese: みんなのGOLF(ゴルフ) 4, Hepburn: Minna no Gorufu 4) released as Hot Shots Golf Fore! in North America, Everybody's Golf in Europe and Everybody's Golf 2004 in Australia, is a golf video game developed by Clap Hanz and published by Sony Computer Entertainment for the PlayStation 2. It is the successor to Everybody's Golf 3 / Hot Shots Golf 3 (2001) and was succeeded by Everybody's Golf 5 / Hot Shots Golf: Out of Bounds (2007).

== Gameplay ==
This game delivers more realistic physics, sharper graphics, more golfers, caddies and courses than before. Miniature golf games and online play for players with the Network Adaptor are also driving features. The developers increased the overall number of characters from 15 to 24, added more caddies (10 in all) and boosted the number of courses from six to 15. Of these 15 courses, 10 are new, while five are returning favorites from the previous game. The game also features a Tournament mode where up to 32 players can compete against each other. Cameo roles as playable characters in the North American and PAL versions are unlockable characters Ratchet (from the Ratchet & Clank series) and Jak (from the Jak and Daxter series, as he would later appear in Jak 3). Ratchet and Jak's caddies are Clank and Daxter, respectively. A Pipo Monkey (from the Ape Escape series) is an unlockable caddie in the Japanese and PAL versions, giving the PAL version the largest character roster overall.

Everybody's Golf 4 implements the "Everybody's Points" system where players earn and spend points to unlock new gear and extras. Several different modes of play are available and include Tour (full season of tournaments), Tournament (instant action mode), VS Mode (challenge golfers to unlock new characters/costumes) and Training (in game tutorial mode). In addition, there are two online play modes: Head to Head (one on one play with another player) and Real Time Tournament (real time online golf tourneys). The North American and PAL versions included online play while Japanese did not. The North American online play servers were shut down as of 30 June 2008.

One unique feature is an unlockable "Advanced Mode" that allows players to golf without the grid showing where the ball is expected to land when taking a shot or putting. This grid is typically used in golfing video games.

== Reception ==
Reception

Aggregate score
Aggregator	Score
Metacritic	80/100

Review scores
Publication	Score
Electronic Gaming Monthly	7.33/10
Eurogamer	8/10
Famitsu	36/40
Game Informer	9/10
GamePro	4/5
GameRevolution	B
GameSpot	7.3/10
GameSpy	3.5/5
GameZone	9/10
IGN	8.8/10
Official U.S. PlayStation Magazine	3.5/5
CiN Weekly	(favourable)
Playboy	89%

The game received "favourable" reviews according to the review aggregation website Metacritic. In Japan, Famitsu gave it a score of all four nines for a total of 36 out of 40.

CiN Weekly gave it a favourable review and said: "Though hard-core golfers might not appreciate exaggerated plaid pants on cartoon characters and sarcastic golfers, pretty much everyone else will get into the game's taunting, tricks and big hit effects and exaggerated character personalities". Playboy gave it 89% and said that the game "successfully balances accessibility and depth, and manages to add a host of new features while staying true to what's made this franchise so popular. It's a highly recommended pick for PS2 owners looking for a little more fun on the fairway". However, Maxim gave it three-and-a-half stars out of five and said that "even if you lack broadband, the bizarre characters and 13 arcade-style courses to choose from will keep you giddier than Carl Spackler on a gofer [sic] hunt".
