= Everybody's Tennis =

2006 video game

- European cover art
- Developer: Clap Hanz (Note: Additional work by Sony Computer Entertainment Japan)
- Publisher: Sony Computer Entertainment
- Series: Everybody's Golf
- Platform: PlayStation 2
- Release: JP: 14 September 2006; EU: 13 April 2007; AU: 3 May 2007; NA: 17 July 2007
- Genre: Sports
- Modes: Single-player, multiplayer

Everybody's Tennis, (Note: Japanese: みんなのテニス, Hepburn: Minna no Tenisu) known as Hot Shots Tennis in North America, is a 2006 tennis video game developed by Clap Hanz and published by Sony Computer Entertainment for the PlayStation 2. It is a spin-off of the Everybody's Golf series.

In September 2016, the game was ported to PlayStation 4 via the PS2 Classics service.

== Gameplay ==
The game has 14 characters, 5 umpires, and 11 tennis courts. There are three different modes to choose from: Challenge Mode, Tennis with Everybody, and Training Mode. In Challenge, you play against computer-controlled opponents in order to unlock things like alternate costumes for characters and more courts to play on. In Tennis with Everybody, matches may be played with 1 to 4 players. The training mode lets players practice positioning and timing shots. Players may choose from service, volley, smash and general practices in this mode.

Few of the characters from the previous games of the series (both American and Japanese) make cameo appearances on the courts (usually only in Singles matches). Suzuki and Gloria return as being playable characters.

== Reception ==
Reception

Aggregate score
Aggregator	Score
Metacritic	70/100

Review scores
Publication	Score
Electronic Gaming Monthly	5.17/10
Eurogamer	6/10
Famitsu	32/40
Game Informer	8.25/10
GamePro	3.5/5
GameRevolution	B
GameSpot	5/10
GameSpy	3.5/5
GameTrailers	7.5/10
GameZone	8/10
IGN	7.6/10
PlayStation: The Official Magazine	8/10
The New York Times	(average)
The Sydney Morning Herald	2.5/5

The game received "average" reviews according to the review aggregation website Metacritic. In Japan, Famitsu gave it a score of 32 out of 40.
