= Everybody's Tennis Portable =

2010 video game

- European cover art
- Developer: Clap Hanz
- Publisher: Sony Computer Entertainment
- Series: Everybody's Golf
- Platform: PlayStation Portable
- Release: JP: 25 February 2010; EU: 18 June 2010; NA: 29 June 2010; AU: 30 June 2010
- Genre: Sports
- Modes: Single-player, multiplayer

Everybody's Tennis Portable, also known as Everybody's Tennis in the PAL region, Hot Shots Tennis: Get a Grip in North America, and Minna no Tennis Portable (みんなのテニスポータブル, Minna no Tenisu Pōtaburu) in Japan, is the tenth game in the Everybody's Golf series and the third released for PlayStation Portable.

== Reception ==
Reception

Aggregate score
Aggregator	Score
Metacritic	80/100

Review scores
Publication	Score
1Up.com	B
Eurogamer	8/10
Famitsu	34/40
GameSpot	7.5/10
GameZone	8/10
IGN	8/10
Jeuxvideo.com	15/20
PlayStation Official Magazine – UK	8/10
PlayStation: The Official Magazine	4/5
PSM3	82%
Metro	7/10

The game received "favourable" reviews according to the review aggregation website Metacritic. Eurogamer said: "Everybody's Tennis is the ideal handheld approach to the sport, exchanging realism for lightheartedness without compromising the quality of the tennis". In Japan, Famitsu gave it a score of two nines and two eights for a total of 34 out of 40.
