= Everybody's Golf =

Video game series

- Logo since 2017
- Genre: Sports
- Developers: Camelot Software Planning (1997); Japan Studio (1997-2019); Clap Hanz (1999-2019); Drecom (2017); HYDE (2025)
- Publishers: Sony Interactive Entertainment (1997-2019); Bandai Namco Entertainment (2025)
- Platforms: PlayStation; PlayStation 2; PlayStation Portable; PlayStation 3; PlayStation Vita; PlayStation 4; PlayStation 5; Nintendo Switch; Microsoft Windows; Android; iOS
- First release: Everybody's Golf (1997); 17 July 1997
- Latest release: Everybody's Golf Hot Shots; 5 September 2025

Everybody's Golf, (Note: Japanese: みんなのGOLF(ゴルフ), Hepburn: Minna no Gorufu) formerly known as Hot Shots Golf in North America, is a series of sports video games published by Sony Interactive Entertainment. The series is known for its humorous take on the game of golf, featuring cartoon-like and anime-like characters, and a realistic engine with precise ball physics.

The first game in the series was released in 1997, and was developed by Camelot Software Planning. Subsequent titles were developed by Clap Hanz, until Everybody's Golf VR in 2019. Two tennis-focused spin-offs, Everybody's Tennis and Everybody's Tennis Portable, were also released. The latest title, Everybody's Golf Hot Shots, was released on 5 September 2025, and it was developed by Hyde.

As of March 2017, the series had sold more than 14 million copies worldwide.

== Games ==
Release timeline
1997	Everybody's Golf
1998
1999	Everybody's Golf 2
2000
2001	Everybody's Golf 3
2002
2003	Everybody's Golf Online
2003	Everybody's Golf 4
2004	Everybody's Golf Portable
2005–2006
2007	Everybody's Golf Field
2007	Everybody's Golf 5
2007	Everybody's Golf Portable 2
2008
2009	Everybody's Stress Buster
2010
2011	Everybody's Golf 6
2012–2016
2017	Everybody's Golf
2017	MinGol
2018
2019	Everybody's Golf VR
2020–2024
2025	Everybody's Golf: Hot Shots

=== Main series ===
==== Everybody's Golf (1997) ====
Everybody's Golf (Hot Shots Golf in North America) has several modes—including Tournament, Training, Stroke Play, and Match Play—as well as a Miniature Golf course. The game features several unlockable characters that can be earned by defeating them. The player gains experience points for their character by winning tournaments and hitting a variety of shots. These points are used to open new courses. Everybody's Golf features six different courses and a free-moving game camera.

==== Everybody's Golf 2 ====
Everybody's Golf 2 (Hot Shots Golf 2 in North America) brings some improvements over the original, such as more realistic character models, which differed from the anime-style characters seen in the original game.

The game also features several game modes, including Stroke, Match, and Tournament play, as well as Versus, which allows players to unlock new characters. Gameplay itself is a version of the standard '3 click' variety used by the majority of golf games.

This is the first game in the series to include crossover characters: Sweet Tooth from Twisted Metal, Sir Daniel Fortesque from MediEvil, and Gex from the Gex video game series. This set of characters exclusively appeared in the American and European versions.

==== Everybody's Golf 3 ====
Everybody's Golf 3 (Hot Shots Golf 3 in North America) is the third installment of the series, which has similar but refined visuals. The game features the same '3 click' system for hitting the ball as its predecessor. The game sold over one million copies worldwide.

John Daly is an unlockable golfer in this game, which makes him the first real-life golfer to appear in the series. He appears only in the American release.

==== Everybody's Golf 4 ====
Everybody's Golf 4 (Hot Shots Golf Fore! in North America) contains more realistic physics and better graphics. In addition, the game introduced online play with the Network Adaptor. The developers increased the number of characters from 15 to 24, added more caddies (10 in all) and boosted the number of courses from 6 to 15. Of these, 10 are new, while five are returning favorites from the previous game. The game also features an online Tournament mode where up to 32 players can compete against each other. The North American and European versions included online play, while Japanese did not. This game has a few guest characters from other games, including Jak (as a playable character) and Daxter (as a caddie) from the Jak and Daxter series, and Ratchet (as a playable character) and Clank (as a caddie) from the Rachet & Clank series. The game was titled Hot Shots Golf Fore! in North America.

==== Everybody's Golf 5 ====
This version sold over 150,000 copies during its first week on sale. The game was renamed Hot Shots Golf: Out of Bounds in North America, and Everybody's Golf: World Tour in Europe.

==== Everybody's Golf 6 ====
Everybody's Golf 6 borrows courses from Everybody's Golf 4 and downloadable content was available through the PlayStation Store. Players are able to leave each other comments through the "LiveArea" system. Players are able to view the golf course using PlayStation Vita's augmented reality feature. The game was renamed in North America as Hot Shots Golf: World Invitational.

==== Everybody’s Golf (2017) ====
Everybody's Golf was released worldwide in August 2017 for PlayStation 4. The game marks the end of the alternate Hot Shots branding for the North American market, with the title Everybody's Golf being used worldwide.

==== Everybody's Golf Hot Shots ====
Everybody's Golf Hot Shots was released for PlayStation 5, Nintendo Switch and Microsoft Windows in 2025. Through a licensing agreement with Sony Interactive Entertainment, it is the first in the series to be published for non-PlayStation systems. It is also the first console installment to not be published by Sony, with Bandai Namco Entertainment performing publishing duties, and it is not developed by series developer Clap Hanz, with Japanese studio Hyde developing the game.

=== Spin-offs ===
==== Everybody's Golf Online ====
Everybody's Golf Online was released in June 2003 for PlayStation 2, only in Japan. Its servers were shut down in 2005.

==== Everybody's Golf Portable ====
This game features three modes. The single-player game offers players the chance to unlock characters and items by competing in tournaments or by stroke play. Training mode lets golfers practice their skills on various courses with no pressure. The wireless multiplayer mode allows up to eight players to play a course together in various head-to-head matches, real-time tournaments, or the new putting challenge.

The 10 new characters can be customized with more than 250 items of clothing, accessories, clubs, and balls for a unique style. Once players gain enough to go even further under par. The game was renamed Hot Shots Golf: Open Tee in North America.

==== Everybody's Tennis ====
This game has 14 characters, 5 umpires, and 11 tennis courts. There are 3 different modes to choose from, which are Challenge Mode, Tennis with Everybody, and Training Mode. In Challenge Mode, the players play against computer-controlled opponents in order to unlock features like alternate costumes for characters and more courts to play on. In Tennis with Everybody, there are play matches with 1 to 4 players. The training mode allows practice positioning and timing shots, and choosing from service, volley, smash and general practice.

A small number of the characters from the previous games of the series (both American and Japanese) make cameo appearances on the courts (usually only in Singles matches). Suzuki and Gloria return as being playable characters.

==== Everybody's Golf Field ====
Everybody's Golf Field (Note: みんなのGOLF(ゴルフ)場) was released in 2007 for PlayStation Portable, only in Japan. Released in four volumes, each volume focuses on real-life golf courses from different regions in Japan. The game is compatible with the GPS accessory and acts as a digital caddie.

==== Everybody's Golf Portable 2 ====
Notably, this title came with PSP System Software version 3.96, and is the only place where this firmware version can be found as it was never released online. The game was renamed Hot Shots Golf: Open Tee 2 in North America.

==== Everybody's Stress Buster ====
Everybody's Stress Buster, released in Japan as Everybody's Sukkiri, and in North America as Hot Shots Shorties, is a minigame compilation first released in 2009 for PlayStation Portable. While the game was released physically in Japan and Southeast Asia, it was a PlayStation Network exclusive in the rest of the world. It was split into four download packs—Red, Green, Yellow, and Blue—with three minigames included in each.

Minigames include book sorting, baseball, boxing, and vegetable fighting. Certain games can be played with characters from the Everybody's Golf and Everybody's Tennis games.

==== Everybody's Tennis Portable ====
Another tennis game for the PlayStation Portable. Renamed in North America as Hot Shots Tennis: Get a Grip.

==== MinGol ====
MinGol is the first game in the series released for Android and iOS. It is developed by Drecom and published by ForwardWorks (now under Sony Music Entertainment Japan). It was released only in Japan in 2017, and has not received an international release, despite the game still receiving regular content updates.

==== Everybody’s Golf VR ====
Everybody's Golf VR is a PlayStation VR title and the first virtual reality game of the series. It was released worldwide in May 2019.

== PlayStation Home ==
The Everybody's Golf space

Clap Hanz released a space for the Everybody's Golf series in the Asian, European, and Japanese versions of the PlayStation 3's online community-based service, PlayStation Home. The space was called the "Everybody's Golf Space" in Europe, the "Minna no Golf Lounge" in Japan, and the "Hot Shots Golf Lounge" in North America (using the Asian version of the game's name). The space featured a Questionnaire (in Europe called "A gift from Suzuki"), which is a survey that rewards an EG Lawn Sofa, a video screen, a poster, seats for the avatars, and a Full Game Launching Support feature for Everybody's Golf 5. Game Launching is a feature that lets users set up a game in PlayStation Home and launch directly into the game from Home. The space was released on 11 December 2008 for the Japanese version, 18 June 2009 for the European version, and 1 October 2009 for the North American version. It was shut down alongside PlayStation Home on 31 March 2015 worldwide.

== Reception ==
Aggregate review scores As of November 25, 2025.
Game	GameRankings	Metacritic	OpenCritic
Everybody's Golf	(PS) 81%	—	—
Everybody's Golf 2	(PS) 83%	—	—
Everybody's Golf 3	(PS2) 86%	(PS2) 85	—
Everybody's Golf 4	(PS2) 80%	(PS2) 80	—
Everybody's Golf Portable	(PSP) 82%	(PSP) 81	—
Everybody's Tennis	(PS2) 70%	(PS2) 70	—
Everybody's Golf 5	(PS3) 82%	(PS3) 81	—
Everybody's Golf Portable 2	(PSP) 83%	(PSP) 82	—
Everybody's Stress Buster	(PSP) 55%	—	—
Everybody's Tennis Portable	(PSP) 81%	(PSP) 80	—
Everybody's Golf 6	(PS3) 80% (Vita) 78%	(Vita) 76	—
Everybody's Golf	(PS4) 78%	(PS4) 78	72% recommend
Everybody's Golf Hot Shots	—	(NS) 66/100 (PS5) 72/100 (PC) 68/100	53% recommend

== See also ==
- Mario Golf
