= Everybody's Golf (2017 video game) =

2017 sports video game

- Developers: Clap Hanz; Japan Studio
- Publisher: Sony Interactive Entertainment
- Directors: Toshiyuki Kuwabara; Keisuke Futami; Junichi Fuyuki
- Producer: Masashi Muramori
- Designer: Masashi Muramori
- Series: Everybody's Golf
- Platform: PlayStation 4
- Release: NA: 29 August 2017; PAL: 30 August 2017; JP: 31 August 2017
- Genre: Sports
- Modes: Single-player, multiplayer

Everybody's Golf, released as New Everybody's Golf (Note: Japanese: New(ニュー) みんなのGOLF(ゴルフ), Hepburn: Nyū Minna no Gorufu) in Japan, is a 2017 sports video game developed by Clap Hanz and Japan Studio and published by Sony Interactive Entertainment for the PlayStation 4. It is the twelfth game in the Everybody's Golf video game series and is the follow up to 2011's Everybody's Golf 6.

== Gameplay ==
Gameplay screenshot

The game features character creation and customization, online play and the ability to free roam around the game's golf courses. Players are also able to drive golf carts anywhere around the course.

== Development and release ==
The game was revealed at a press briefing prior to the Tokyo Game Show in September 2014, with a planned release in 2015. Shuhei Yoshida of Sony's Worldwide Studios said that the game features open world elements for the first time in the history of the series.

The game marks the end of the alternate Hot Shots branding for the North American market, with the title Everybody's Golf being used worldwide.

The pre-order pack before the game's release consisted of a number of in-game items: a course to celebrate the 20th anniversary of the game series, a premium golf cart, exclusive character costumes and a PlayStation 4 dashboard theme. An update was released in collaboration with Level-5, who were celebrating their 20th anniversary and had a close relationship with Sony during their early years. It adds characters to the game from their Dark Cloud, White Knight Chronicles, Ni no Kuni II, Professor Layton, and Yo-kai Watch franchises.

In March 2022, Clap Hanz announced the end of all online support for Everybody's Golf. The game's online services were terminated on 30 September 2022.

== Reception ==
Reception

Aggregate scores
Aggregator	Score
Metacritic	78/100
OpenCritic	72% recommend

Review scores
Publication	Score
Destructoid	8.5/10
GameSpot	8/10

Everybody's Golf received "generally favorable" reviews, according to review aggregator Metacritic. Fellow review aggregator OpenCritic assessed that the game received strong approval, being recommended by 72% of critics.

=== Accolades ===
Everybody's Golf was nominated for "PlayStation Game of the Year" at the Golden Joystick Awards. In Game Informer's Reader's Choice Best of 2017 Awards, it came in fourth place for "Best Sports Game". The game was also nominated for "Sports Game of the Year" at the 21st Annual D.I.C.E. Awards, for "Game, Franchise Sports" at the National Academy of Video Game Trade Reviewers Awards, and for "Best Casual Game" and "Best Social Game" at The Independent Game Developers' Association Awards 2018.
