= Everybody's Golf 6 =

2011 video game

- Japanese cover art
- Developers: Clap Hanz; Japan Studio
- Publisher: Sony Computer Entertainment
- Series: Everybody's Golf
- Platforms: PlayStation Vita, PlayStation 3
- Release: PlayStation Vita: JP: 17 December 2011; NA: 15 February 2012; EU: 22 February 2012; AU: 23 February 2012; PlayStation 3: JP: 22 November 2012; NA: 23 July 2013; PAL: 24 July 2013
- Genre: Sports
- Modes: Single-player, multiplayer

Everybody's Golf 6, (Note: Japanese: みんなのGOLF(ゴルフ) 6, Hepburn: Minna no Gorufu 6) known in Europe as Everybody's Golf, in Australia as Everybody's Golf: World Invitational, and in North America as Hot Shots Golf: World Invitational, is a 2011 sports video game developed by Clap Hanz and Japan Studio and published by Sony Computer Entertainment for the PlayStation Vita. The eleventh game in the Everybody's Golf series, It was released as a launch title for the PlayStation Vita in all regions and was ported to PlayStation 3 in 2012 and 2013 with additional changes. The game was followed up by PlayStation 4's Everybody's Golf released in 2017.

== Gameplay ==
Gameplay screenshot on PlayStation Vita

Everybody's Golf features all-new courses, and downloadable content is available through both retail and the PlayStation Store. Players are able to leave each other comments through the "Live Area" system, and view the golf course using PlayStation Vita's augmented reality feature. The PlayStation 3 port later appeared with additional changes to the gameplay adding in support for cross platform play and PlayStation Move. Outside of Asia, this port was released exclusively on the PlayStation Store. The DLC that was on the Vita version was free at launch. The PlayStation 3 version also adds two new modes, "Slot Mode" and "Minna no Short Course". Slot Mode gives players certain advantages that are won via slots. Minna no Short Course puts players on courses that consists exclusively of short holes. The game brought two courses back from previous games such as Mt. Sakura C.C. and Northern Fox C.C.

== Reception ==
Reception

Aggregate score
Aggregator	Score
Metacritic	76/100

Review scores
Publication	Score
Destructoid	9/10
Edge	7/10
Eurogamer	7/10
Famitsu	38/40
Game Informer	7.5/10
GameRevolution	4/5
GameSpot	7/10
GameTrailers	8/10
GameZone	8/10
IGN	6.5/10
Pocket Gamer	4.5/5
PlayStation: The Official Magazine	6/10
The Guardian	4/5
VentureBeat	75/100
Digital Spy	4/5
Metro	7/10

The Vita version received "generally favourable reviews" according to the review aggregation website Metacritic. Critics praised the game, with PlayStation LifeStyle calling it "an outstanding game, bursting with fun, and enjoyable by gamers of all demographics" in its review. Simon Parkin of Eurogamer wrote: "Everybody's Golf will never stand centre stage in the Vita's launch line-up. But in truth, it's one of the strongest launch titles, offering taut fun and challenge in a rapid-fire, quick-load manner that's perfectly suited to the handheld". In Japan, Famitsu gave it a score of one ten, one nine, one ten, and one nine for a total of 38 out of 40.

Mark Langshaw of Digital Spy gave the Vita version four stars out of five, saying: "The game does what the series has excelled at since day one, provide an accessible golfing experience that anyone can enjoy. Unlike some of the other titles in the Sony platform's library, this one doesn't rely on gimmicks. Its focus is solid gameplay, depth and charm, and it has these things down to a tee". Armando Rodriguez of 411Mania gave it a score of 7.9 out of 10, calling it "a solid entry in the series. Great graphics, fun (if frustrating) gameplay, great online options and a ton of stuff to unlock make it a worthy purchase. Just be prepared to endure some frustrating moments!" However, Roger Hargreaves of Metro gave it seven out of ten, saying: "It may not offer any surprises, but with a mountain of modes, options and unlockables this amiable golf sim is another excellent showcase for the PS Vita".

The game was the best-selling Vita game in Japan at launch time.
