= Everybody's Golf Portable 2 =

2007 video game

- Japanese cover art
- Developer: Clap Hanz (Note: Additional work by Japan Studio)
- Publisher: Sony Computer Entertainment
- Series: Everybody's Golf
- Platform: PlayStation Portable
- Release: JP: 6 December 2007; NA: 3 June 2008; EU: 11 June 2008; AU: 26 June 2008
- Genre: Sports
- Modes: Single-player, multiplayer

Everybody's Golf Portable 2, (Note: Japanese: みんなのGOLF(ゴルフ) ポータブル2, Hepburn: Minna no Gorufu Pōtaburu Tsū) known as Everybody's Golf 2 in the PAL region (Australian version titled Everybody's Golf: Open Tee 2) and Hot Shots Golf: Open Tee 2 in North America, is a golf video game developed by Clap Hanz and published by Sony Computer Entertainment for the PlayStation Portable. It is the eighth game in the Everybody's Golf series and the second to be released for the PlayStation Portable. It was released in Japan in December 2007 and internationally in June 2008.

The game featured an online mode where up to 16 players were able to play on a single course. The servers shut down on 5 December 2011, making it impossible to play online since then.

== Reception ==
Reception

Aggregate score
Aggregator	Score
Metacritic	82/100

Review scores
Publication	Score
Destructoid	8.5/10
Eurogamer	8/10
Famitsu	37/40
Game Informer	8/10
GamePro	4/5
GameRevolution	B+
GameSpot	7/10
GameSpy	4.5/5
GameTrailers	8/10
GameZone	8.5/10
Hardcore Gamer	4/5
IGN	8.5/10
Pocket Gamer	4.5/5
PlayStation: The Official Magazine	3.5/5
Maxim	4.5/5
The Sydney Morning Herald	4/5

The game received "favourable" reviews according to the review aggregation website Metacritic. Eurogamer called it an unfussy feel-good game. IGN said: "Open Tee 2 delivers a solid, easy-to-use golf engine that gets mixed with wacky characters and costumes". In Japan, Famitsu gave it a score of 37 out of 40.
