= Clap Hanz =

Japanese video game developer

Clap Hanz, Ltd.
- Native name: 株式会社クラップハンズ
- Romanized name: Kabushiki-Gaisha Kurappu Hanzu
- Company type: Kabushiki gaisha
- Industry: Video games
- Founded: April 2, 1998
- Founder: Masashi Muramori
- Headquarters: Kitasaiwai 〒 220-0004 1-11-15, Nishi-ku, Yokohama, Japan
- Products: Everybody's Golf
- Number of employees: 22 (April, 2024)

Clap Hanz, Ltd. is a Japanese video game developer located in Yokohama. The company is best known for developing the Everybody's Golf series (formerly known as Hot Shots Golf in North America) for several PlayStation consoles. The company was established in 1998 and is headed by Masashi Muramori.

== Games developed ==
Year	Title	Publisher(s)	Platform(s)
1999	Everybody's Golf 2	Sony Computer Entertainment	PlayStation
2001	Everybody's Golf 3	Sony Computer Entertainment	PlayStation 2
2003	Minna no Golf Online	Sony Computer Entertainment	PlayStation 2
2003	Everybody's Golf 4	Sony Computer Entertainment	PlayStation 2
2004	Everybody's Golf Portable	Sony Computer Entertainment	PlayStation Portable
2006	Everybody's Tennis	Sony Computer Entertainment	PlayStation 2
2007	Everybody's Golf 5	Sony Computer Entertainment	PlayStation 3
2007	Everybody's Golf Portable 2	Sony Computer Entertainment	PlayStation Portable
2009	Everybody's Stress Buster	Sony Computer Entertainment	PlayStation Portable
2010	Everybody's Tennis Portable	Sony Computer Entertainment	PlayStation Portable
2011	Everybody's Golf 6	Sony Computer Entertainment	PlayStation Vita, PlayStation 3
2017	Everybody's Golf	Sony Interactive Entertainment	PlayStation 4
2019	Everybody's Golf VR	Sony Interactive Entertainment	PlayStation 4 (PlayStation VR)
2021	Easy Come Easy Golf	Clap Hanz	iOS, macOS, tvOS, Nintendo Switch
2024	Ultimate Swing Golf	Clap Hanz	Meta Quest 3, Meta Quest Pro, Meta Quest 2
