= Everybody's Golf 3 =

2001 video game

- Japanese cover art
- Developer: Clap Hanz (Note: Additional work by Sony Computer Entertainment Japan)
- Publisher: Sony Computer Entertainment
- Composer: Shingo Okumura
- Series: Everybody's Golf
- Platform: PlayStation 2
- Release: JP: 26 July 2001; NA: 12 March 2002
- Genre: Sports
- Modes: Single-player, multiplayer

Everybody's Golf 3, (Note: Japanese: みんなのGOLF(ゴルフ)3, Hepburn: Minna no Gorufu 3) known as Hot Shots Golf 3 in North America, is a 2001 sports video game developed by Clap Hanz and published by Sony Computer Entertainment for the PlayStation 2. It is the third game in the Everybody's Golf series and the first to not be released on the PlayStation.

== Reception ==
Reception

Aggregate score
Aggregator	Score
Metacritic	85/100

Review scores
Publication	Score
AllGame	4/5
Electronic Gaming Monthly	9/10
Famitsu	33/40
Game Informer	9.25/10
GamePro	5/5
GameRevolution	B+
GameSpot	7.2/10
GameSpy	80%
GameZone	7.8/10
IGN	8/10
Official U.S. PlayStation Magazine	4/5
The Cincinnati Enquirer	4/5
Playboy	88%

The game received "favourable" reviews according to the review aggregation website Metacritic. In Japan, Famitsu gave it a score of 33 out of 40.

Maxim gave it a perfect score of all five stars and said that the game was "easier to play than a sorority co-ed. In fact, the gameplay is so basic you can handle it easily while half in the bag". Playboy gave it 88% and called it "a perfect virtual getaway -- without the pretension". However, The Cincinnati Enquirer gave it four stars out of five, saying: "[Don't] be disillusioned by the fun and light-hearted presentation: 'Hot Shots Golf 3' is deep where it counts – the game play".

By July 2006, the game had sold 800,000 copies and earned $22 million in the United States. Next Generation ranked it as the 77th highest-selling game launched for the PlayStation 2, Xbox or GameCube between January 2000 and July 2006 in that country. Combined sales of Everybody's Golf games released between those dates reached 2 million units in the United States by July 2006.
