= Everybody's Golf 2 =

1999 golf video game

- European cover art
- Developer: Clap Hanz (Note: Additional work by Sony Computer Entertainment Japan.)
- Publisher: Sony Computer Entertainment
- Series: Everybody's Golf
- Platform: PlayStation
- Release: JP: 29 July 1999; NA: 7 March 2000; EU: 19 April 2000
- Genre: Sports
- Modes: Single-player, multiplayer

Everybody's Golf 2, known in Japan as Minna no Golf 2 (Note: Japanese: みんなのGOLF(ゴルフ)2, Hepburn: Minna no Gorufu; lit. "Everybody's Golf 2") and in North America as Hot Shots Golf 2, is a golf video game developed by Clap Hanz and published by Sony Computer Entertainment for the PlayStation. It is the second game in the Everybody's Golf series, the first in the series to not be developed by Camelot Software Planning and the debut game of Clap Hanz.

== Reception ==
Reception

Aggregate score
Aggregator	Score
GameRankings	83%

Review scores
Publication	Score
AllGame	3.5/5
Eurogamer	8/10
Famitsu	34/40
Game Informer	8/10
GameFan	91%
GamePro	4/5
GameSpot	8/10
IGN	(2000) 9.2/10 (2007) 7.5/10
Jeuxvideo.com	(2008) 16/20 (2000) 14/20
Official U.S. PlayStation Magazine	3.5/5

The game received favourable reviews according to the review aggregation website GameRankings. In Japan, Famitsu gave it a score of 34 out of 40.
