= Chihaya =

Chihaya may refer to:

== Places ==
- Chihaya Castle, a castle in Kawachi Province, Japan
- Chihaya Flower Park, a public park in Toshima Ward
- Chihaya Station, a railway station in Fukuoka City, Japan
- Chihaya Yard, a classification yard in Fukuoka City, Japan
- Chihaya, Fukui, a location in the Fukui Prefecture, Japan
- Siege of Chihaya, a siege that took place during the Kamakura period of Japan

== People ==
- Akane Chihaya (千早 茜; born 1979), a Japanese author
- Sarah Chihaya, American writer, professor, and literary critic
- Chihaya Adachi (born 1963), Japanese scientist
- Chihaya Sasaki (佐々木 千隼; born 1994), Japanese baseball player
- Chihaya Yoshitake (吉武 千颯; born 1999), Japanese singer

== Ships ==
- Seven ships have been named "Chihaya"

== Fictional characters ==
- Chihaya Ayase (綾瀬 千早), a character from Chihayafuru
- Chihaya Kisaragi (如月 千早), a character from The Idolmaster
- Gunzou Chihaya (千早 群像), a male character from Arpeggio of Blue Steel
- Anon Chihaya (千早 愛音), a character from BanG Dream! It's MyGO!!!!!

== Other uses ==
- Chihaya (clothing)
