= Gunbird 2 =

1998 video game

- Developers: Psikyo; Kuusoukagaku, Mobirix, APX Soft, Google Play (Android)
- Publishers: Capcom; Dreamcast: JP/NA: Capcom; PAL: Virgin Interactive; PS4, Xbox One, Switch, Windows; City Connection
- Producer: Shinsuke Nakamura
- Designers: Hiroshi Yamada; Hideyuki Oda; Norikazu Takemori; Yoko Tsukagoshi; Emi Taniguchi; Keizou Fujita; Kunio Asahara; Masashi Kajikawa; Shinji Nohara; Naozumi Yorichika
- Programmers: Shiori Saito; Kenichi Fujita; Kunihiko Nogomi; Katsuhiro Nishida; Katsuya Shikanouchi
- Artist: Masato Natsumoto
- Composer: Masaki Izutani
- Series: Gunbird
- Platforms: Arcade, Dreamcast, Android, iOS, Nintendo Switch, Windows, PlayStation 4, Xbox One
- Release: Arcade: JP: December 1998; Dreamcast: JP: March 9, 2000; NA: November 15, 2000; PAL: February 2, 2001; Android: KOR: 2014; WW: April 7, 2016; iOS; May 31, 2016; Switch; June 21, 2018; Windows; June 10, 2020; PS4, Xbox One; August 3, 2022
- Genre: Scrolling shooter
- Modes: Single-player, multiplayer
- Arcade system: Psikyo SH2

Gunbird 2 (ガンバード2, Ganbādo 2) is a 2D scrolling shooter developed by Psikyo and published by Capcom as a sequel to the original Gunbird. It was originally released in Japanese arcades in 1998, and was later ported to the Dreamcast in 2000 and released worldwide. An Android version was released in Korea in 2014, before it came out worldwide on both Android and iOS in 2016. The arcade game was also included in Gunbird Special Edition for the PlayStation 2. A version was released on Nintendo Switch in June 2018, Windows in June 2020, and PlayStation 4 and Xbox One in August 2022.

== Gameplay ==
Arcade version screenshot, showing Marion battling the England stage boss.

There are seven stages in each game loop (two loops total). The first three stages are randomly chosen from possible four. At the second loop, enemies fire denser bullet patterns moving at faster speeds. Stage 2-1 takes place at the only stage not available in 1st loop, instead of the 1-1 counterpart. After completing the first loop with only one player, player can choose one of two choices for a wish with magic potion, with unique ending for each choice. If 1st loop is completed with two players, a combination-specific ending is played.

This was the first Psikyo shooter to feature medal-chaining: picking up 2,000 point medals (when they flash) repeatedly results in a slight point increase and a coin chain, recorded separately from the score. This was later featured in Strikers 1945 III/Strikers 1999.

The arcade game supports both English and Japanese languages, chosen via arcade board dip switch settings. The language setting is Japanese if dip switches are set to Japanese, English otherwise.

Two exclusive playable characters in the Dreamcast port of Gunbird 2, released in 2000, includes Morrigan Aensland from the Darkstalkers series and Aine from the Samurai Aces series. Other new features include Internet ranking, gallery, and voices during intermission.

== Plot ==
Seven warriors are challenged to head on a quest to find three powerful elements of Sun, Moon and Stars. Whoever brings the elements to God will be rewarded the legendary Almighty Potion and all its magical powers.

== Reception ==
Reception

Aggregate score
| Aggregator | Score | | |
| Aggregator | Dreamcast | iOS | NS |
|---|---|---|---|
| Metacritic | 64/100 | N/A | 73/100 |

Review scores
| Publication | Score | | |
| Publication | Dreamcast | iOS | NS |
|---|---|---|---|
| AllGame | 2.5/5 | N/A | N/A |
| CNET Gamecenter | 6/10 | N/A | N/A |
| Electronic Gaming Monthly | 6.5/10 (Note: Three critics of Electronic Gaming Monthly gave the Dreamcast version each a score of 7/10, 7.5/10, and 5/10 in an early review.) | N/A | N/A |
| EP Daily | 6.5/10 | N/A | N/A |
| Famitsu | 29/40 | N/A | N/A |
| Game Informer | 5.5/10 | N/A | N/A |
| GameFan | 93% (Note: In GameFan's viewpoint of the Dreamcast version's Japanese import, three critics gave it each a score of 89, 94, and 96.) (E.M.) 90% | N/A | N/A |
| GameRevolution | B− | N/A | N/A |
| GameSpot | 5.8/10 | N/A | N/A |
| GameSpy | 8.5/10 | N/A | N/A |
| IGN | 8.4/10 | N/A | N/A |
| Next Generation | 3/5 | N/A | N/A |
| Nintendo Life | N/A | N/A | 8/10 |
| TouchArcade | N/A | 3.5/5 | N/A |
| Maxim | 3/5 | N/A | N/A |

The Dreamcast and Nintendo Switch versions received "mixed or average reviews" according to the review aggregation website Metacritic. IGN's Anthony Chau said of the former console version: "I hope that most of you that decide to get Gunbird 2 are those that know the excitement of weaving between enemy fire, appreciate 2D artistry, and respect classic gameplay that never gets old. If that's you, you'll definitely be satisfied." GameSpot's Steven Garrett, however, was much more critical of the same console version, opining, "If a good 16-bit shooter is what you're looking for, you could do a lot better elsewhere." Electronic Gaming Monthly and Game Informer gave said console version mixed reviews, nearly two months before it was released Stateside. Tokyo Drifter of GamePro called it "a fantastic shooter with tremendous replay value, and is highly recommended for fans of the genre." (Note: GamePro gave the Dreamcast version two 4/5 scores for graphics and control, 3.5/5 for sound, and 4.5/5 for fun factor.) Jeff Lundrigan of NextGen said of the same console version, "If you want a ridiculously high level of pure twitch-response challenge, look no further. If you don't, well, move along." In Japan, Famitsu gave it a score of 29 out of 40.

Also in Japan, Game Machine listed the arcade version in their January 1, 1999 issue as the fourth most-successful arcade game of December 1998.

== Legacy ==
=== Gunbird Special Edition ===
A compilation including both Gunbird games was released for the PlayStation 2 in Japan in 2004 and Europe in 2005. The version of the game included was based on the arcade version.

=== Cancelled PlayStation Portable remake ===
An enhanced remake, titled Gunbird 2 Remix was announced by PM Studios for the PlayStation Portable in 2009. It was slated for an early 2010 release exclusively in digital format. No news has been heard since then, and it is considered vaporware.
