= Koyori =

Psikyo character

Koyori Togashi
- Sengoku character
- Koyori in Tengai (1996)
- First game: Samurai Aces (1993)
- Created by: Akifumi Yamada
- Designed by: Hirofumi Nakamura; Jun Tsukasa (Tengai)
- Voiced by: Hiroko Emori; Maria Kawamura (Tengai); Asuka Ito (Lost Origin)

Koyori Togashi (Japanese: 富樫こより, Hepburn: Togashi Koyori), called Miko in some western releases, is a shrine maiden in Psikyo's Sengoku series of shoot 'em up games, first appearing in the 1993 arcade game Samurai Aces (released in Japan as Sengoku Ace). Created by Akifumi Yamada and initially designed by Hirofumi Nakamura, Koyori is a bounty hunter and is characterized as a greedy schemer, often emotional. She since went on to appear in later games, now redesigned by artist Jun Tsukasa. While in the original game she flew a biplane, in later titles she was able to fly on her own and is accompanied by a blue shapeshifting shikigami. She has been voiced by multiple actresses across all appearances, including Hiroko Emori, Maria Kawamura, and Asuka Ito.

Koyori has been regarded as the unofficial protagonist of the Sengoku series and a mascot for Psikyo, as well as cited as an example of the importance of unique characters in the shoot 'em up genre. While her original design was well received, her redesign in later games saw a significant increase in popularity, attributed to the developers putting a heavy emphasis on fanservice and contrasted in discussion to its original counterpart. However some such as Kurt Kalata of Hardcore Gaming 101 have questioned this emphasis on fanservice as it has extended to merchandise of the character as well, particularly figures with removable attire.

== Development and design ==
From left to right: Koyori's design as it evolved during Samurai Aces' development. In addition to her hair, focus was put on her eyes as it changed between versions. This version would later be reused in Battle Net Gimmick: Capcom & Psikyo Allstars.

Koyori was created by Psikyo writer Akifumi Yamada for the game Samurai Aces, released in Japan as Sengoku Ace, a scrolling shoot 'em up, set in Japan's Sengoku period with sci-fi elements and fantasy characters. She was designed by artist Hirofumi Nakumura after Yamada gave him a brief outline of the character. A shrine maiden, she was given a biplane to use in-game as he felt it fit her personality and design. While her initial version was created to be a more mysterious character, her design was refined to give her shorter hair and a more tomboyish personality. In a retrospective interview with Gamest magazine, he stated he wasn't particularly satisfied with the character designs, feeling he hadn't cleaned up his rough drafts enough.

When work began on Tengai, known in Japan as Sengoku Blade, artist Jun Tsukasa was given fairly free range to redesign her as he saw fit. One significant change they decided to do between games was to give her a updated appearance to indicate the passage of time between games, particular a significantly enlarged bust to show that she was now two years older. When asked about why he increased it as much as he did, Tsukasa joked that "he received an order from the universe to draw them that way". Most of her design stayed consistent through the game's development, with the most significant change being to decide to tie her hair back. The biplane was removed as characters flew in this title, and she was given a blue shapeshifting shikigami instead to support her in combat. Particular attention was paid to the upper part of her outfit, with development notes insisting to give her flowing loose sleeves and to appear ready to fall off at a moment's notice while simultaneously appearing to firmly secure her chest.

Koyori stands 165 centimetres (5 ft 5 in) tall, and while her bust size is listed as "unmeasurable", her waist and hip measurements are given as 60 and 90 cm (24 and 35 in) accordingly. She has black hair and raised aviator goggles atop her head, with her hair originally cut into a bob cut for Samurai Aces and changed to a ponytail and bang combination for Tengai onward. Her shrine maiden outfit features a white robe that has plunging neckline that exposes her cleavage. In Tengai, a red trim was added to this part of her outfit. A red hakama skirt covers her legs, while she wears socks and sandals on her feet. She wields a gohei wand, and has a blue magatama on a string around her neck. In mobile phone releases of Tengai, her design was altered by adding a white undershirt to her artwork.

== Appearances ==
Koyori first appeared in the 1993 video game Samurai Aces, introduced as an outcast shrine maiden characterized as highly emotional and obsessed with money. Flying a biplane, she works alongside other characters in the game to rescue a shogun's daughter from an evil cult. She returned in the follow-up title Tengai, which featured a similar plot of rescuing a princess from the cult, but in this game the characters were given the ability to fly without needing a vehicle, and she was now accompanied by a shapeshifting shikigami named Basaro. Koyori is also playable in the last game in the trilogy, Sengoku Cannon, fighting the cult again who has now decided to use normal humans to achieve their goals. She was voiced by Hiroko Emori Samurai Aces and Maria Kawamura in Tengai, while her voice actress in Sengoku Cannon was uncredited.

Outside of the Sengoku series, Koyori was also featured in Mahjong Hot Trick Integral, a strip poker-style mahjong for arcades, later re-released as Taisen Hot Gimmick Mix Party, as well as the game Taisen Hot Gimmick: Cosplay-Jan. She additionally appears as a character in mahjong title Battle Net Gimmick: Capcom & Psikyo Allstars for the Dreamcast, as part of a crossover between the two companies and using both her Samurai Aces and Tengai designs. In crossovers with other company's games, she and several other characters from the Sengoku and Gunbird series appeared in Joycity's mobile game "Hero Ball Z". She also appeared in the game "Last Origin" as part of a collaboration event with Studio Valkyrie, featuring a slightly modified appearance that added a sash around her chest. She was voiced by Asuka Ito for this appearance, while Tsukasa provided additional art for the title.

== Promotion and reception ==
To promote the sale of Tengai arcade cabinets, company Worldwide Video focused on Koyori and fellow character Katana's presence in the game as selling points. In merchandise, several Koyori figures have been released over the years by companies such as Enterbrain, Daiki Kougyou, Cerberus Project, and MegaHouse, some of which feature removable clothing. Other items have included phone cards produced in partnership with Gamest, as well as desktop wallpapers to promote Capcom & Psikyo All-Stars. Meanwhile, the special edition of Psikyo Collection Vol. 3 featured a box and artbook with artwork showcasing the character, as well as a 3D mousepad which utilized the character's breasts for the wrist rest.

Koyori was well received upon debut, quickly becoming popular regardless of region and seen as an unofficial mascot for Psikyo as a company. The Japanese Sega Saturn magazine named her one of the best characters on the Saturn, praising her chest and describing her as a rare character "who can cater to even the most niche of customers". Meanwhile, Chinese magazine Gamer and Touhou Project creator ZUN cited her as an example of the importance of unique characters in the shoot 'em up genre. Heiwajima Michiro writing for Japanese magazine Game Hihyou praised the character designs in Tengai, feeling their visibility in-game made it easier to empathize with the cast, but also considered Koyori large breasts a signature aspect of Psikyo's design style.

Ultra Console Game magazine stated that despite her young appearance in the first game, the combination of the shrine maiden outfit and aviator goggles left a striking impression on players who quickly saw her as the game's protagonist. They further stated that while side-scrolling shoot 'em up titles were not popular in China, they felt Tengai's success was entirely because of her, stating that her own popularity rose exponentially thanks to Tsukasa's redesign. However, they also found it humorous that while her design was alluring, players would quickly discover she was one of the more difficult characters to play as.

Gamest in their Gals Island series of magazines state that while Samurai Aces became popular for its storylines and characters, they felt Koyori carried the title due to her in-game dialogue and abilities, and further praised her interactions with fellow character Jane. However, they expressed confusion as to why her breasts had been made larger in the game's sequel, yet felt her additional physical exposure was in-line with her characterization as an outcast shrine maiden and felt it helped her popularity expontentially, though jokingly called her obsession with money problematic. Additional praise was given to voice actress Maria Kawamura, who they were pleased to see continued to voice her in Tengai's Saturn version.

David DiRienzo of Hardcore Gaming 101 stated that while Koyori was not the protagonist of the Sengoku series, but was the most popular character due to her large breasts. He further noted that while the shoot 'em up genre was not one they expected to see large breasts be a factor, "Psikyo found a way, though, and God bless them for that". DiRienzo further praised how the company utilized such characters to bring an identifiable element to their shooter games, something they felt gave the titles a bit of personality. He described her redesign for Tengai as shifting away from a spunky tomboy into "one of the most blatant examples of fanservice ever seen in a non-hentai shoot-em-up". Kurt Kalata meanwhile questioned her Sengoku Cannon merchandise, namely the figures that featured fully removable clothing. While he acknowledged that this wasn't unusual in Japan as part of otaku culture, he felt it was odd to see such officially sanctioned by the developers.

Bawang Xie of Chinese gaming outlet Lei Ling Old Boy felt that her name and character design were initially meant to be homages to Sayo-chan, the female protagonist of the game Pocky & Rocky. However, he noted that was where the similarities ended, as while Sayo was seen as "pure and kind", he described Koyori as a "hot, extremely greedy", scheming character, pointing at the moment she betrays fellow character Ayin in both Samurai Aces and Tengai solely to keep the bounties to herself. He overall enjoyed the comedic aspects of some of her Tengai endings, but was surprised when the game gave her yuri overtones, in how several of her endings resulted in her being paired with a female character, such as the princess, through her own volition.
