= Gunbird =

1994 video game

- Developer: Psikyo
- Publishers: Arcade; Psikyo; Jaleco (USA); Saturn; Atlus; PlayStation; XS Games; Yahoo Mobile; Cave; Windows (Steam); Console Classics (expired), City Connection; PS4, Xbox One, Switch; City Connection
- Director: Naozumi Yorichika
- Producers: Junichi Niwa; Shinsuke Nakamura
- Designers: Emi Taniguchi; Wataru Yamazaki; Hyoue Ogawa; Hideyuki Oda; Yoko Tsukagoshi; Ikuya Yoshida; Norikazu Takemori; Hidenori Kamioka
- Programmers: Toshinori Sugita; Seiki "SSS" Sato; Shiori Saito; Keisuke Takagi
- Artist: Hirofumi Nakamura
- Writer: Hiroshi Yamada
- Composer: Masaki Izutani
- Series: Gunbird
- Platforms: Arcade, PlayStation, Saturn, Yahoo Mobile, PlayStation Network, Nintendo Switch, Windows, PlayStation 4, Xbox One
- Release: Arcade: JP/NA: 1994; Saturn: JP: December 15, 1995; PlayStation: JP: December 15, 1995; EU: 2002; NA: March 19, 2003; Yahoo Mobile; 2002; PlayStation Network: NA: June 25, 2009; Steam: NA: July 17, 2015; (Mobile Light Force): WW: May 11, 2020; (Gunbird); Switch: NA: December 7, 2017; PS4, Xbox One: WW: July 27, 2022
- Genre: Scrolling shooter
- Modes: Single-player, multiplayer
- Arcade system: Psikyo 1st Generation

Gunbird (ガンバード) is a vertically scrolling shooter developed by Psikyo and released as an arcade video game in 1994. In the US, it was published by Jaleco. It has been re-released multiple times, including on the Sega Saturn, PlayStation, Steam, Nintendo Switch, PlayStation 4 and Xbox One. When originally localized outside Japan by XS Games, Gunbird was retitled Mobile Light Force. The game was followed by Gunbird 2 in 1998 and was included in Gunbird Special Edition for PlayStation 2.

== Gameplay ==
Marion battling the castle stage boss (arcade).

When a player collides with the body of an enemy unit, the player loses a shot power level, and a power up flies around the screen and disappears as soon as it reaches the edge. If a player is at the lowest level of shot, the player loses a bomb instead.

There are seven stages in each of the game's two loops. The first three stages are randomly chosen from possible four. In the second loop enemies fire denser bullet patterns moving at faster speeds. Stage 2-1 takes place at the only stage not available on the first loop, instead of the 1-1 counterpart. The remaining two stages are chosen at random, but does not include the replaced stage. After completing first loop with only one player, the player can choose one of two choices for a wish with a magic potion, with unique endings for each choice. If the first loop is completed with two players, a combination-specific ending is played. Each game (on default settings) begins with three lives, and an extra life is earned at 400,000 (or 600,000).

The cutscenes between the battles with two players fighting cooperatively are frequently packed with hilarious dialogue and situations. This is often a recurring theme with Psikyo games, the Gunbird games being no exception. There are no cutscenes when playing second loop stages. The Korean arcade version contains English dialog but some sound samples are missing during play.

== Plot and characters ==
Gunbird uses manga-styled character as the player's chosen craft. A story plays out in between levels and before boss fights, telling a tale of how the protagonists are trying to collect pieces of a magic mirror to make a wish.

- Ash (アッシュ): A 28-year-old German man with a jet pack on his back, who in some of the scenes between battles is discovered to be an inventor, and when two players choose Marion and Ash as cooperative partners, he takes an unhealthy interest in her. Voiced by Ryōtarō Okiayu.
- Marion (マリオン): A 13-year-old witch from England who flies on a broomstick. She is accompanied by her talking pet rabbit, Pom-Pom, and frequently abuses the poor creature verbally and physically. Marion is fun-loving and thrill-seeking but also selfish, and has a mean streak (which Pom-Pom is often witness to). Voiced by Chiharu Tanaka.
- Valnus (バルナス): A big robot created in Russia six months ago that has some of the best firepower in the game. Secretly wishes to be human. Voiced by Kazuya Tatekabe.
- Yuan Nang (ヤンニャン): A strong-willed and courageous woman whose character design is highly influenced by that of Sun Wukong from the Chinese classical story Journey to the West, including a cloud-somersault parody, Ruyi Jingu Bang, and the size-changing headband that was used by the monk Tang Sanzang. Voiced by Naoko Matsui.
- Tetsu (鉄): A strong, white-haired old man of 60 years. He is homosexual in a rather uncloseted manner and rides in a man-powered helicopter. Voiced by Sakunosuke Maya.
- The Trump (トランプ): A group of sky pirates consist of Ace (voiced by Jōji Yanami), Claud (voiced by Kazuya Tatekabe), and their female leader Rouge (voiced by Noriko Ohara). They are not playable and serve as the players' rivals in the story.

== Development and release ==
The game was released in Japan for the PlayStation and Sega Saturn on December 15, 1995.

The game was released in North America as Mobile Light Force for the PlayStation. All in-game plot in this version, including the game's ending, was removed and character names were changed to those of XS Games employees. The game featured a Charlie's Angels-style cover picture, completely unrelated to the original characters or the game's theme. The original's fan art gallery was also removed from the game, although the directories are still intact on the disc if inserted into a PC.

Gunbird Special Edition was a version of the game was based on an arcade version, and included the sequel, Gunbird 2. It was released only for the PlayStation 2 in 2004–2005.

Gunbird was included in Psikyo Collection Vol. 1 for Nintendo Switch along with Strikers 1945, Samurai Aces and Sol Divide in 2018.

In 2022, the original arcade version was included as part of the Sega Astro City Mini V, a vertically-oriented variant of the Sega Astro City mini console.

== Reception ==
Reception

Review scores
Publication	Score	
Publication	PS	Saturn
Consoles +	N/A	82%
Famitsu	7/10, 7/10, 7/10, 8/10	7/10, 7/10, 7/10, 8/10
Joypad	N/A	83%
M! Games	N/A	70%
Video Games (DE)	N/A	69%
Dengeki PlayStation	60/100, 75/100, 55/100, 50/100	N/A
Fun Generation	N/A	6/10
Mega Force	N/A	80%
PlayStation Plus	74/100	N/A
PSX-Pro	5/10	N/A
Sega Power	N/A	71%
Sega Pro	N/A	58%
Sega Saturn Magazine (JP)	N/A	7.66/10
Última Generación	N/A	58/100
Ultimate Future Games	80%	N/A

Award
Publication	Award
Gamest (1994)	(ARC) Best Shooting Award 4th

In Japan, Game Machine listed Gunbird on their November 15, 1994 issue as being the ninth most-popular arcade game for the previous two weeks. Japanese publication Micom BASIC Magazine ranked the game eighth in popularity in its January 1995 issue. Gamest awarded it at the eighth annual "Gamest Awards", taking 4th place in the "Best Shooting Award". Hardcore Gaming 101's Nick Zverloff found the game very enjoyable but felt that it lacked the polish of later Psikyo titles. In an article for the mook Play This Retro Game!, writer Kaze no Iona commented that while the game has a conventional control system, it is well-paced compared to 1980s shooters, noting that the flashy power-ups make shooting fun.

The PlayStation version was met with mixed reception from critics. The game received a score of 21.4 out of 30 in a readers' poll conducted by the Japanese PlayStation Magazine.

Gunbird on Nintendo Switch garnered "mixed or average" reviews, according to review aggregator site Metacritic.

=== Saturn ===
The Sega Saturn version received an average reception from critics. Micom BASIC Magazine ranked the Saturn version eighth in popularity in its March 1996 issue, and it received a score of 22.2 out of 30 in a readers' poll conducted by Saturn Fan. In 2000, Gunbird earned an average score of 8.1878 out of 10 in a reader survey conducted by the Japanese Sega Saturn Magazine, raking among Saturn titles at number 335.
