= Hiroko Emori =

Japanese voice actress

Hiroko Emori (江森 浩子, Emori Hiroko) is a Japanese voice actress who works for Aoni Production.

== Filmography ==
=== Television animation ===
- GeGeGe no Kitaro (1985), Sunakake Baba
- Saint Seiya (1986), Seiya (Young), Kiki
- Dragon Ball (1987), Chiaotzu
- Dragon Ball Z (1989), Chiaotzu, Bulma's Mother, Idasa's Mother
- Dragon Quest: Legend of the Hero Abel (1989), Minea
- Dragon Quest: The Adventure of Dai (1991), Piroro, Nabara
- Sailor Moon (1992), Balm, Garoben, Kazuko Tadashita
- Marmalade Boy (1994), Chiyako
- Sailor Moon S (1994), Hurdler (Daimon)
- Ojarumaru (2001), Taruko
- Dragon Ball Kai (2009), Chiaotzu
- One Piece (2013), Jora
- Dragon Ball Super (2015), Chiaotzu

Unknown date

- Kamen no Ninja Akakage as Shōta
- Blue Comet SPT Layzner as Anna Stephanie
- BS Tantei Club: Yuki ni Kieta Kako as Toshie, Sachi Tachibana
- Chibi Maruko-chan as Oyone
- Domain of Murder as Keita Toyama
- Dr Slump as Aoi Kimidori
- Galaxy High as Aimee Brightower
- G Gundam as Gina
- High School! Kimengumi as Maki Hidari
- Himitsu no Akko-chan as Kenta, Frog
- Kabuki Klash as Tsunade
- Kiteretsu Daihyakka as Osugi, Tsutomu
- Nintama Rantarō as Danzo Kato, Heidayū Sasayama, Tomomi, Nintama, Hemuhemu (young)
- Zatch Bell! as Yopopo
- Rumiko Takahashi Anthology as Risa Hoshino
- Sally, the Witch as Tetsuo Araki
- Samurai Aces and Sengoku Blade: Sengoku Ace Episode II as Miko (Koyori)
- Shounen Ashibe as Shinichi Sakata, Mayumi
- Valkyrie Profile & Valkyrie Profile: Lenneth as Yumeru, Celia
- Wonder Beat Scramble as Bio
- Wing-Man as Yukari

=== Original video animation (OVA) ===
- Fight! Iczer One (1985), Cobalt
- Legend of the Galactic Heroes (1988), Emperor Erwin Josef II
- Slow Step (1991), Ayako Sawamura
- Armitage III (1995), Bronski

=== Theatrical animation ===
- Dragon Ball: Mystical Adventure (1988), Chiaotzu
- Little Nemo: Adventures in Slumberland (1989), Oompy
- Dragon Ball Z: The Tree of Might (1990), Chiaotzu
- Dragon Ball Z: Bojack Unbound (1993), Chiaotzu
- Dragon Ball Z: Battle of Gods (2013), Chiaotzu

=== Video games ===
- Urusei Yatsura: Stay with You (1990)
- Tenshi no Uta (1991), Clair
- Ys IV: The Dawn of Ys (1993), Aria
- Makeruna! Makendō 2: Kimero Youkai Souri (1995; PlayStation version), Mamarin
- Another Century's Episode (2005), Anna Stephanie
- Shining Hearts (2010), Madera Magus
- Digimon Story: Cyber Sleuth (2015), Jesmon

=== Dubbing ===
- Thomas the Tank Engine & Friends (1995-1998), Caroline the Car
