= Aero Fighters =

1992 video game

- North American arcade flyer
- Developer: Video System
- Publishers: Arcade: JP: Tecmo; NA: Mc O'River; Super NES: JP: Video System; NA: Mc O'River
- Designer: Shin Nakamura
- Composer: Naoki Itamura
- Series: Aero Fighters
- Platforms: Arcade, Super NES
- Release: Arcade: JP: March 1992; NA: April 1992; EU: 1992; Super NES: JP: July 30, 1993; NA: November 1994
- Genre: Scrolling shooter
- Modes: Single-player, multiplayer

Aero Fighters, known as Sonic Wings (Note: Japanese: ソニックウィングス, Hepburn: Sonikku Wingusu) in Japan, is a vertically scrolling shooter developed by Video System and published as an arcade video game by Tecmo in 1992. It is the first installment of the Aero Fighters series. A Super Nintendo Entertainment System version was released in 1993 in Japan and 1994 in North America.

== Gameplay ==
This game uses basic shooter mechanics of the SHMUP genre of video games. Pressing button 1 fires normal weapons; this can be upgraded by collecting P or the rare F items, though the maximum power level has a hidden ammo count, after which the player will return to the previous power level. Pressing button 2 launches a powerful special attack; uses are limited to how many B items the player has collected (every life starts with two). Some ground enemies will drop score items when destroyed; they appear as the currency of the selected character's nation. By default, players start with three lives, and can acquire one more at 200,000 points.

Aero Fighters has a large cast of characters, unheard of in 1992. Each pair of characters represents one of four nations. The two-player sides may only select the four characters given (one for each nation). In a two-player game, only a single nation can be chosen.

Country	Player 1	Player 2
United States	Blaster Keaton (Boeing F/A-18 Hornet)	Keith Bishop (Grumman F-14 Tomcat)
Japan	Hien (Mitsubishi FSX)	Mao Mao (Mitsubishi F-15 Eagle)
Sweden	Kohful The Viking (Saab AJ-37 Viggen)	Tee-Bee 10 (Saab JAS 39 Gripen)
United Kingdom	Villiam Syd Pride (McDonnell Douglas AV-8 Harrier II)	Lord River N. White (Panavia Tornado IDS)

Arcade screenshot

The game has seven stages divided into two parts. The first three stages are selected randomly from a group of four, with one for each character's nation; however, a character will never go to its nation's stage. The other four stages are fixed. After beating all seven stages, the player sees the character's ending, then play much more difficult versions of those stages, after which the game truly ends.

In the Super Nintendo version, a special code can be used to play with the spaceship from Rabio Lepus.

== Reception ==
In Japan, Game Machine listed Aero Fighters as the second most successful table arcade unit of April 1992. RePlay also reported it to be the second most popular arcade game at the time. Despite being a solid entry, the arcade version had little to distinguish itself from the competition. One critic wrote: "Aero Fighters is a thoroughly solid game, let's get that out of the way. It is also a game that is easy to forget. At a time when shooters were a dime a dozen it didn't exactly stand out."

GamePro gave the Super NES version a negative review, saying the weapons are imaginative but the game suffers from slowdown, mediocre graphics, weak sound effects, and "monotonous" music, concluding that "Aero Fighters' action won't stay with you - it's a temporary thrill that eventually retreats to the hanger."

== Legacy ==
The arcade version was released in 2005 for the PlayStation 2 by Hamster Corporation as part of the Japan-exclusive Oretachi Gēsen Zoku series. In 2022, the original arcade version was included as part of the Sega Astro City Mini V, a vertically-oriented variant of the Sega Astro City mini console. Copies of the game are rare, with astronomical prices on auction sites. Hamster Corporation released the game as part of the Arcade Archives series for the Nintendo Switch and PlayStation 4 in December 2023.

=== Sequels ===
Shin Nakamura, the main designer of Aero Fighters and a number of other Video System games, disliked the company's plan to start developing on the Neo Geo. He wanted to make more vertical games like Aero Fighters, but found it difficult to do so on a horizontal monitor. He and other like-minded employees left to found Psikyo, with the similar Samurai Aces being their first game.

Aero Fighters is the only entry in the series released under the McO'River brand name. The remaining Aero Fighters staff began to work on sequels alongside other Video System employees. Aero Fighters 2 and Aero Fighters 3 were released for the Neo Geo. Sonic Wings Special, a sort of "dream match" game based on the three previous entries, was released for the Sega Saturn and later for the PlayStation. Soon after, Special was reworked for the arcades into Sonic Wings Limited. In 1997, McO'River, Inc. changed its name to Video System U.S.A., Inc. A year later, Paradigm Entertainment developed Aero Fighters Assault for Video System. Sonic Wings Special and Limited were both made for a vertical monitor like the first game. Similarly, Nakamura would make Strikers 1945 Plus for the Neo Geo a few years later.

In November 2024, a new game in the Aero Fighters series was announced: Sonic Wings Reunion. It was launched on May 29, 2025 in Japan for the PlayStation 5, PlayStation 4, Nintendo Switch, and arcades.

== In popular culture ==
YouTuber and author John Green, having come across the game while at the Savannah Airport, mistakenly read the title as "Nerd Fighters" while filming a video addressing his brother Hank Green on the popular YouTube channel Vlogbrothers on February 1, 2007. "Nerdfighters" and "Nerdfighteria" eventually became the collective title of the Vlogbrothers' fan community. In September 2013, he was given an Aero Fighters arcade cabinet as a gift.
