= Strikers 1945 =

1995 video game

- Sega Saturn cover art
- Developers: Psikyo; KMBOX (iOS/Android); Zerodiv (Switch, PS4, XONE, Windows)
- Publishers: Psikyo; Atlus (Saturn, PlayStation); Taito (PS2); APX Soft (iOS/Android, 2016); Zerodiv (Switch, PS4, XONE); City Connection (Windows)
- Director: Naozumi Yorichika
- Producers: Junichi Niwa; Shinsuke Nakamura
- Designers: Wataru Yamazaki; Hyoue Ogawa; Hideyuki Oda; Yoko Tsukagoshi; Ikuya Yoshida; Norikazu Takemori
- Programmers: Toshinori Sugita; Seiki "SSS" Sato; Shiori Saito
- Artist: Yoshiyuki Takani
- Writer: Hiroshi Yamada
- Composer: Masaki Izutani
- Series: Strikers 1945
- Platforms: Arcade, Sega Saturn, PlayStation, iOS, Android, Nintendo Switch, Microsoft Windows, PlayStation 4, Xbox One
- Release: 1995: JP: June 28, 1996 (Sega Saturn) July 19, 1996 (PlayStation) August 3, 2017 (Switch); April 30, 2020 (Windows); June 29, 2022 (PlayStation 4, Xbox One)
- Genres: Scrolling shooter, bullet hell
- Modes: Up to 2 players, simultaneously
- Arcade system: Psikyo 1st Generation

Strikers 1945 (ストライカーズ1945), also known as Striker 1945, is a vertically scrolling shoot 'em up bullet hell arcade game developed and published by Psikyo in 1995. In Japan, it was ported to the PlayStation and Sega Saturn by Atlus in 1996; later was also released as part of Psikyo Shooting Collection Vol. 1: Strikers 1945 I & II by Taito for the PlayStation 2 (in Europe by Play It under the name 1945 I & II: The Arcade Games). The game was followed by Strikers 1945 II in 1997 (released in North America as just "Strikers 1945"), and Strikers 1945 III in 1999, as well as the second title remake called Strikers 1945 Plus.

In 2022, the original arcade version was included as part of the Sega Astro City Mini V, a vertically-oriented variant of the Sega Astro City mini console.

== Gameplay ==
Arcade version screenshot, showing the P-38 Lightning in battle against Super Battleship Kii.

Each plane in Strikers 1945 has three attacks: a normal shot, a charged shot, and a bomb that clears the screen of minor enemies and bullets. Both normal and charged shot can be strengthened by grabbing power-ups and extra bombs can be collected. Gold bars, which are found by destroying certain buildings or enemies, can be collected for bonus points. After the defeat of the final boss, the player's time, number of gold bars, and number of enemies killed are added up for each level and, if high enough, marked with a silver or gold medal. In the Japanese arcade version, a hidden post-credits bonus can be unlocked if the player beat the entire game without losing a life, showing the six pilots (five females and one male) posing undressed.

== Plot ==
It is the Summer of 1945 and World War II has ended. The world once again returned to its state of peace. However, a mysterious organization called C.A.N.Y. emerged to conquer the world using super weapons never seen before. It is composed of high-ranking international military officials. Six best fighters, who together form a team called Strikers, have been chosen secretly by United Military Headquarters for a mission against this threat. Near the end of the game it is revealed to the player that C.A.N.Y are actually a race of aliens that set out to take over the world. The last stages have the selected plane travel to the Moon to destroy C.A.N.Y's secret base and the true leader, Mecha C.A.N.Y.

== Reception ==
Reception

Review score
Publication	Score
Dengeki PlayStation	85/100, 90/100, 80/100, 80/100

In Japan, Game Machine listed Strikers 1945 on their July 15, 1995 issue as being the fourth most-successful arcade game of the month. Consoles + reviewer rated the imported Saturn version at 92%.
