= Tengai =

1996 video game

- Japanese arcade flyer
- Developer: Psikyo
- Publishers: Psikyo; Taito (PS2); Atlus (SAT); Blue Bean Soft (Korea); MOBIRIX (Mobile)
- Directors: Hiroshi Yamada; Naozumi Yorichika
- Producers: Junichi Niwa; Shinsuke Nakamura
- Designers: Wataru Yamazaki; Hyoue Ogawa; Hideyuki Oda; Yoko Tsukagoshi; Ikuya Yoshida
- Programmers: Toshinori Sugita; Seiki "SSS" Sato; Shiori Saito; Yoshikazu Mori; Keisuke Takagi
- Artist: Tsukasa Jun
- Writer: Hiroshi Yamada
- Composer: Masaki Izutani
- Series: Sengoku Ace
- Platforms: Arcade, Sega Saturn, PlayStation 2, iOS, Android, Nintendo Switch, Windows, PlayStation 4, Xbox One
- Release: Arcade: JP: 1996; Saturn: JP: November 22, 1996; PlayStation 2: JP: December 2, 2004; Switch: JP: March 29, 2018; Windows: WW: June 22, 2020; PlayStation 4 and Xbox One: WW: August 3, 2022
- Genre: Shoot 'em up
- Modes: Single-player, multiplayer
- Arcade system: Psikyo 1st Generation

Tengai, known as Sengoku Blade (Note: Sengoku Blade (戦国ブレード｜Sengoku Burēdo) fully titled Sengoku Blade: Sengoku Ace Episode II.) in Japan, is a horizontally scrolling shoot 'em up video game released for arcade machines in 1996 by Psikyo as a sequel to their 1993 shooter Sengoku Ace. A home console version was also released for the Sega Saturn. The game was ported years later to the PlayStation 2, and again for iOS and Android devices and the Nintendo Switch, Windows, PlayStation 4 and Xbox One. The game is set in a historical fantasy version of the Sengoku period of Japanese history, featuring demons, magic and steam-powered robotics.

== Gameplay ==
Sengoku Blade features a style reminiscent of feudal Japan

Sengoku Blade is horizontal-scrolling shoot 'em up. The game takes place in an imaginative and futuristic version of feudal Japan featuring steam-powered machinery. The Saturn version provides an option to choose a difficulty level between 1 and 7, configure controls, and set the number of lives between 1 and 4.

The player may choose from five playable characters at the start and may unlocked two more. Items include a power-up to increase weapon power level, bombs, and bonus coins to increase score. Holding down the standard shot button can provide a more powerful shot.

If the player touches an enemy ship, their weapon power level will drop by one. The player will lose a life if they get hit by an enemy bullet. If all lives are lost, continues are provided. Once the game is beaten once, a second round will begin without the ability to use continues. Score rankings and other options can be saved to the system's memory.

== Plot ==
=== Story ===
The game is set in the world where magic and technology co-exist. A militaristic cult Shinrano, scheming the resurrection of their dark god, has kidnapped the Shogun's daughter Princess Futsu (Futsuhime) for a sacrifice. A group of heroes sets out to stop this evil plot. The game features branching storyline and several different endings, depending on the characters chosen.

=== Characters ===
The characters were designed by the now-famous Tsukasa Jun (at that time still an "underground" artist), based on the works of Hirofumi Nakamura in the original game. Tsukasa also returned to design the characters for the second sequel.

- Tengai (Tengai Kano) (ターボ坊主 天外) - a Buddhist warrior-monk from the previous game, who has become the main character in the sequel. Voiced by Shōzō Iizuka.
- Koyori Togashi (富樫こより) - a busty Shinto shrine maiden. Called Miko in western releases, she has become the series' symbol and a fan favourite due to her increased sex appeal in comparison to the original game. Voiced by Maria Kawamura.
- Junis Hayate (ユーニス) - a spunky 12-year-old ninja girl with a pet lemur-like animal named Socrates. She is the younger sister of Jane from Sengoku Ace (who had disappeared at the end of the previous game, but Junis believes that she is alive and imprisoned at the Evil Castle). Voiced by Hiroko Kasahara.
- Sho / Shoma (Shoumaru) (翔丸) - a young swordsman ninja who is in love with the kidnapped Princess Futsu and feels some crush with Koyori. He wants revenge for the death of his mother and sisters. During the game, it is revealed that his father is the lord of evil, Kiyatsu (the final boss of the game). Voiced by Takehito Koyasu.
- Katana / Hagane (ハガネ) - a samurai robot attempting recover its human body. Katana is really a swordswoman called Hagane and during his ending with Junis, she reveals her first name: Kirie. Voiced by Hōchū Ōtsuka.
- Flush (Flash) / Ayin (Shine-Ain) / Kain / Aine (閃光のアイン) - a one-eyed archer samurai from the previous game, now as a secret character, he is looking for his sister Asuka again. Voiced by Norio Wakamoto.

== Release ==
Originally released for the arcades in 1996, Sengoku Blade was first ported to the Sega Saturn on November 22 of that same year. This version was released as a two-disc double set, including a bonus omake CD-ROM which featured hundreds of Sengoku Ace series artworks (including the official art, guest art, and fan art from a contest by Psikyo), and now is rare and expensive to obtain. Exclusive for the Saturn conversion was the implementation of voices during the brief cut scenes, and the addition of Marion from the Gunbird series as a bonus hidden character.

In 2004, the game was also ported to PlayStation 2 as part of the Psikyo Shooting Collection Vol. 2: Sengoku Ace & Sengoku Blade by Taito, which was re-released one year later as a budget-range title. The Japanese release contains both Sengoku Ace and Sengoku Blade, but in Europe the two games were sold separately. In 2014, the game was released internationally for iOS and Android mobile devices in Japanese, English and Korean. It was also released for the Nintendo Switch in 2018.

The game's original soundtrack was released by Pony Canyon and Scitron on May 17, 1996. Several PVC figures were also released for Koyori and Junis, as well as for the demon-ninja villainess Kaen (火燕)

== Reception ==
In Japan, Game Machine listed Sengoku Blade on their June 1, 1996 issue as being the thirteenth most-successful arcade game of the month.

In a gamesTM retrospective, Sengoku Blade was found to be a simple but enjoyable shooter and given a score of 8 out of 10. They praised the unique graphical style and detail and compared the game favorably to Psikyo's earlier shooter Gunbird. In 1997, the Japanese Sega Saturn Magazine ranked the game's Koyori as the 47th best female character on the platform. The Saturn version has become a collector's item.

== Sequel ==
Sengoku Blade was followed by Sengoku Cannon: Sengoku Ace Episode III, released for the PlayStation Portable in 2005.
