= Dragon Blaze =

2000 video game

- Developer: Psikyo
- Publisher: Psikyo
- Artist: Kouji Ogata
- Composer: Masaki Izutani
- Platforms: Arcade, PlayStation 2, Nintendo Switch, Microsoft Windows, PlayStation 4, Xbox One
- Release: Arcade: 2000; PlayStation 2: June 23, 2006; Nintendo Switch: April 5, 2018; Windows: August 3, 2020; PlayStation 4: June 29, 2022; Xbox One: January 11, 2023
- Genre: Scrolling shooter
- Modes: Single-player, multiplayer
- Arcade system: Psikyo SH2

Dragon Blaze is a shoot 'em up arcade game developed and published in 2000 by Psikyo. It was ported to the PlayStation 2 as part of Taito's Psikyo Shooting Collection Vol. 3: Sol Divide & Dragon Blaze compilation in 2005. The game was later also released on its own as a budget range title for the PlayStation 2 in Europe by 505 Games on 2006. In 2018 the game was ported to the Nintendo Switch by Zerodiv as part of their series of re-releases of classic Psikyo games. The game was later ported to Microsoft Windows, PlayStation 4 and Xbox One.

== Gameplay ==
Arcade version screenshot, showing Ian battling multiple opponents

Dragon Blaze plays like many typical 2D vertically scrolling shooters by Psikyo, although this game is closer to the bullet hell genre than most of the company's other output and the color of the enemies' bullets has been changed from Psikyo's trademark orange to a neon purple. The game gives each character (Quaid, Sonia, Ian, Rob) the standard normal shot, charged shot, and magic bomb, but each character also rides a dragon, which can be dismounted and be used as a weapon itself. The dismounted dragon initially acts as a piercing weapon, and then remains stationary shooting until the player calls it back using the same button. It can also be used to collect items.

== Reception ==
In Japan, Game Machine listed Dragon Blaze on their November 1, 2000 issue as being the fourth best-performing arcade game at the time.
