= Miko clothing =

Clothing worn by miko

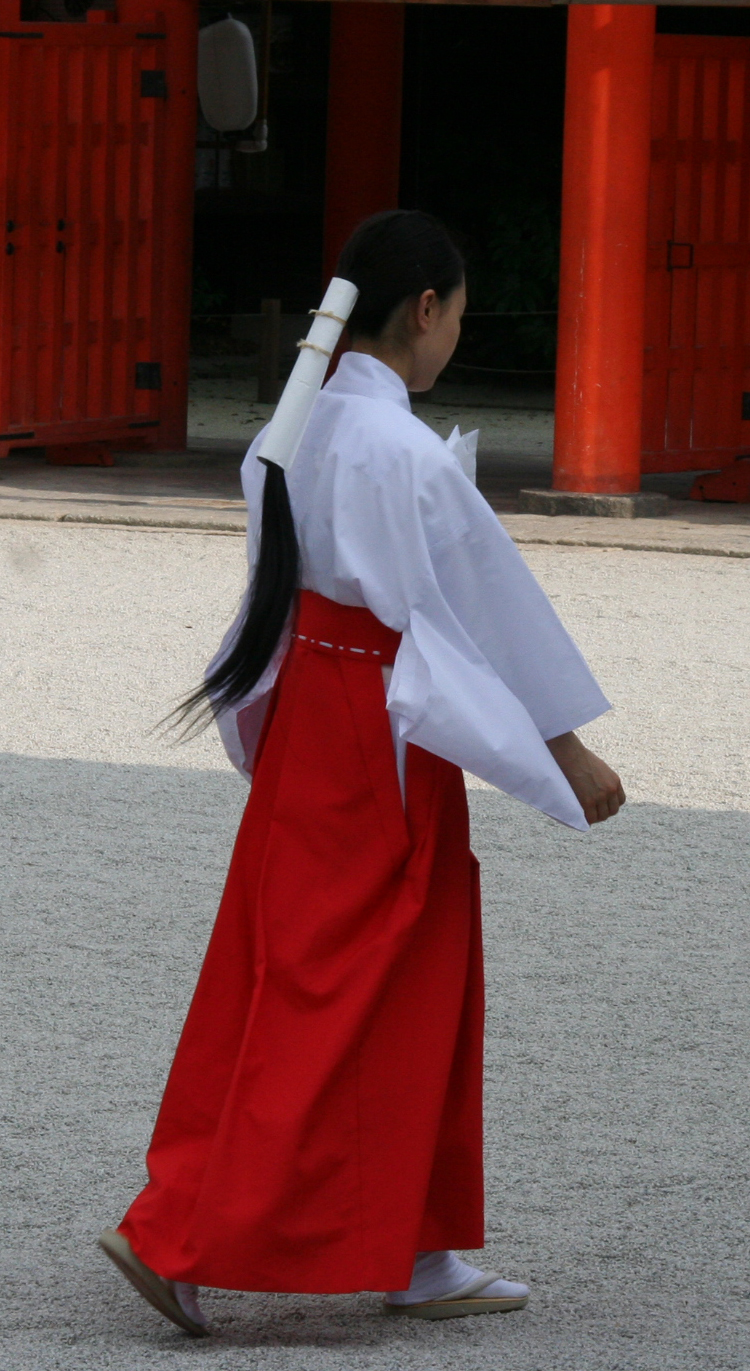
A miko wearing the distinct miko clothing at Shimogamo Shrine

Miko clothing (巫女装束, miko shōzoku) is the clothing worn by miko (shrine maidens) at Shinto shrines.

There are no universal specifications for miko clothing and each Shinto shrine uses clothing based on its own traditions. Although often confused with miko, there are also women among the kannushi (Shinto priests), who wear different clothing than that of the miko.

== Overview ==
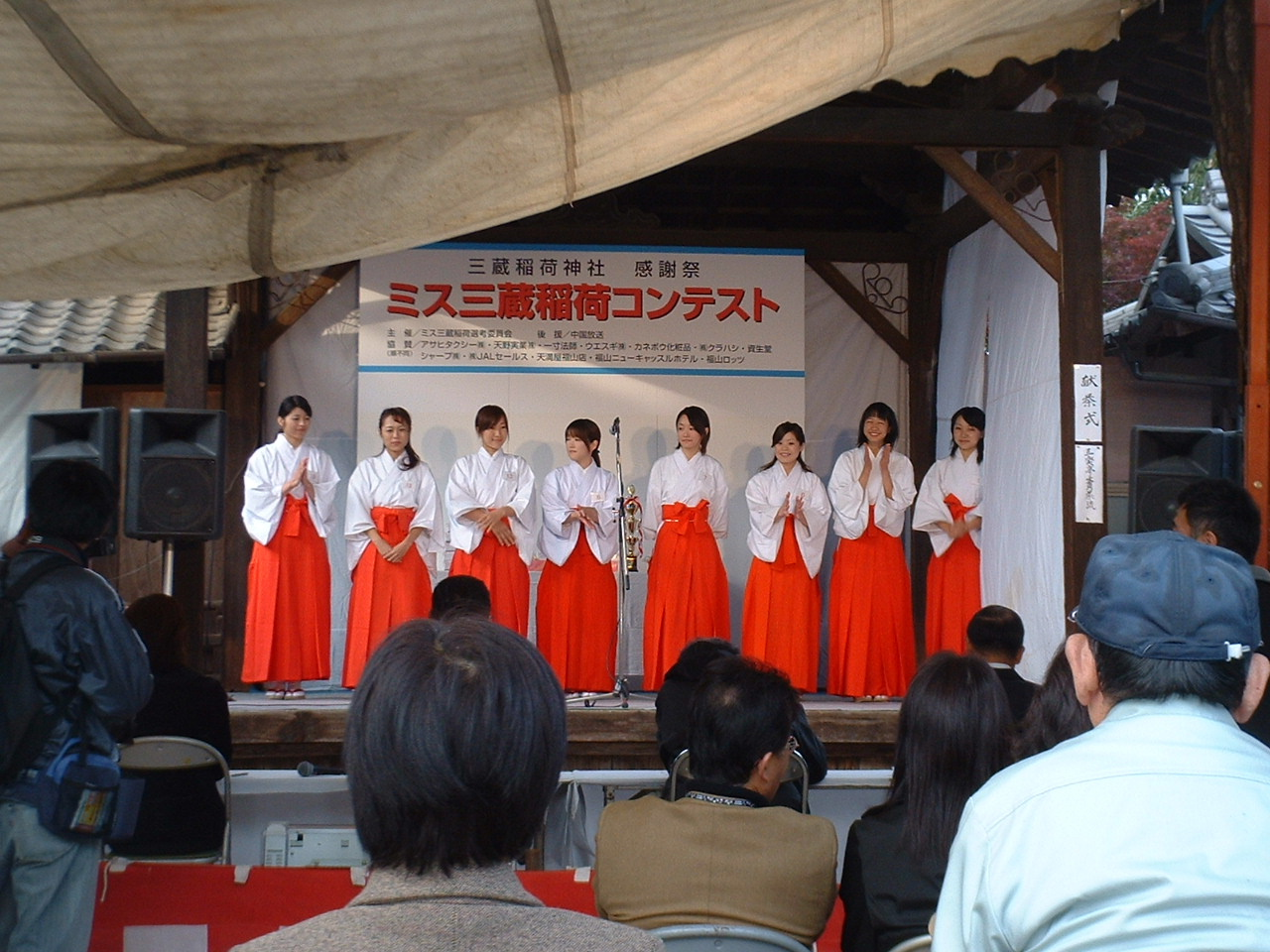
Women dressed in miko costumes

The traditional clothing for miko consists of a white kosode (robe) with a scarlet hakama (trouser-skirt). This combination is considered to be the working clothes of shrines for both men and women. Shinto priests also wear this outfit under their formal attire. Certain colors are forbidden in miko clothing, including yellow sumac dye (the color of the Emperor of Japan), yellow tan (the color of the Crown prince), and dull or gray colors similar to those used for funerals.

Miko clothing is traditionally handled with care. Guidelines for handling it include: "Do not throw it" (do not fling it off), "Do not put it down" (fold it immediately after putting it on and taking it off), and "Do not step over it" (stepping over it is an act of disrespect to the gods). Miko are taught to treat the clothing "like a talisman".

== Core costume ==
=== White robe ===
The white robe (白衣, hakue, byakue, shiraginu) worn on the upper body is a white kosode, with sleeves similar in length to those of a tomesode. Originally, kosode sleeves were worn under daily clothing, but gradually became acceptable outerwear between the end of the Heian period and the Kamakura period The red collar sometimes seen around the neck is a decorative collar (kake-eri) or Date collar (date-eri)., It is a piece of cloth placed between the white clothing and the undergarment in the style of padding of a kouchiki kimono.

Before wearing a white robe, a koshimaki (undergarment) and a hada-juban (undershirt) are put on first. The koshimaki protects the lower body and prevents the hem of the robe from getting caught in the legs. The hada-juban covers the upper body, and is secured with a cord-like white belt tied just below the chest. The collar is placed so that the wearer's left side collar is on top. Normally, a half undershirt is used, but in cooler months, a long undershirt that goes below the knees may be added. Today, it is permitted to wear Western-style clothing under the koshimaki and hada-juban.

The white robe is to be worn after putting on the koshimaki. A white belt is tied below the belt of the undershirt and hidden by the hakama belt, so that the upper part of the undershirt can be seen.

Historically, the white belt was a white string, but in modern times, it has been replaced by a wide elastic band, which is secured with velcro.

=== Hibakama ===
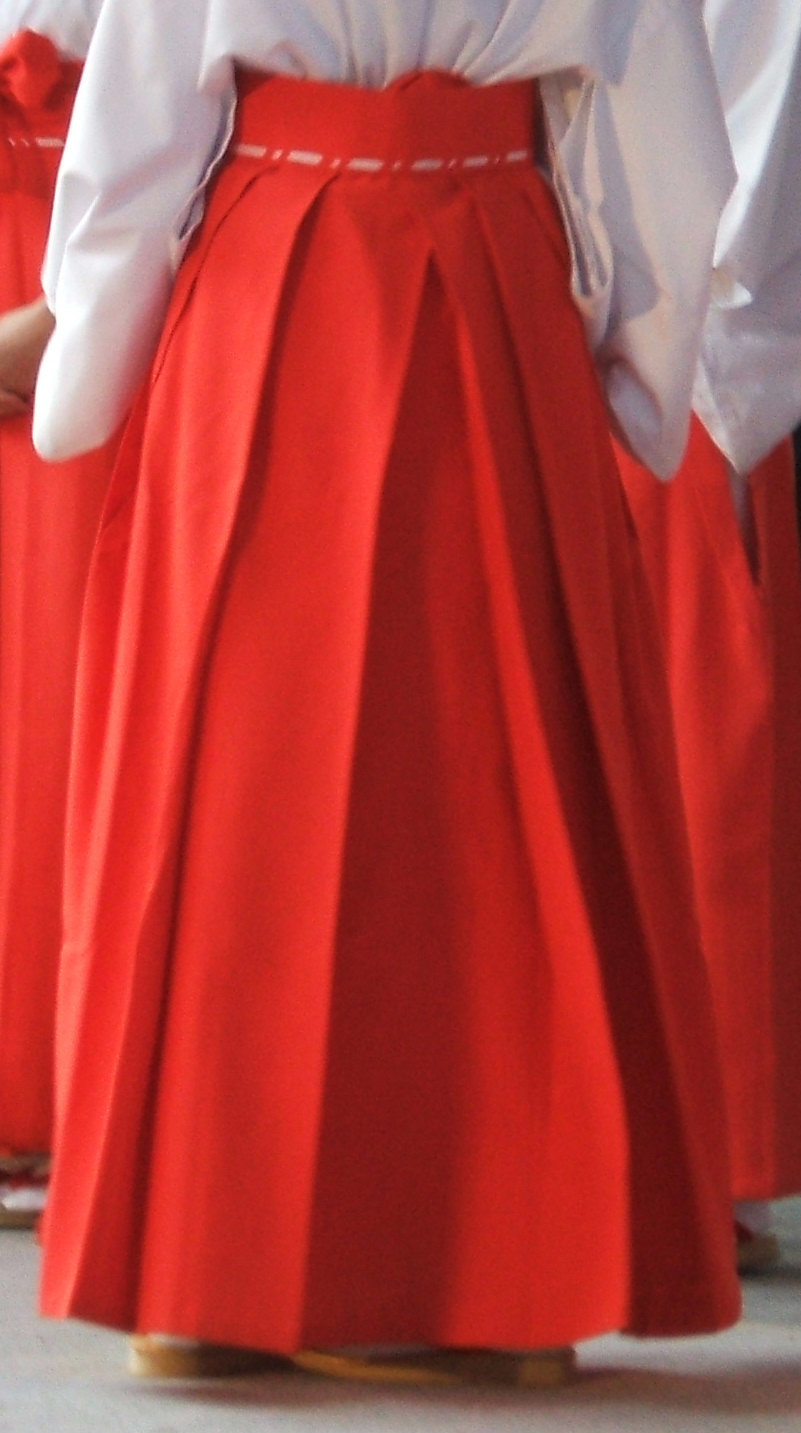
Scarlet hakama seen from behind. The white upper finger thread decoration on the waist is visible. The back sleeves of the white robe can be seen to be open.

The scarlet hakama (緋袴, hibakama) covers the lower half of the body and is typically dyed in scarlet or vermilion shades, as implied by its name. At Kotohira-gū, dark purples are used, and at some shrines, those who have retired from the main duties and remain as clerks wear green or dark blue hakama.

The hibakama was originally a gusseted hakama used by wives and aristocratic women in the Heian period. These long hakama covered the ankles and were primarily designed for indoor use, making it challenging to stand or walk without lifting the hem. In contrast, miko used the kiribakama, a type of hakama suited for outdoor activities such as Kumano-mode pilgrimages.

In modern times, Shinto priests, including female priests, wear traditional hakama with gake (formal pleats) gussets, and such clothing is also worn by miko in certain shrines. Some shrines also require their mikos to wear hakama with gussets, and some shrines also use oguchi hakama.

Like the original hibakama for female courtesans, the lower part of the waist is decorated with six long and seven short white usawashiito or sashinui. Despite the name "the upper finger thread", this stitching consists of thick, twisted "strings" rather than threads. Unlike martial arts hakama, the hibakama does not have a waistboard. Instead, the front and back of hibakama are made with a stiff core that serves as a waist board to prevent it from falling apart.

The hibakama is divided into front and back sections. After putting the legs through the hakama, the front section is adjusted to sit high on the hips. The back section is then adjusted by hooking the front section with a koshihera spatula, though some hibakama may lack this feature. The knot is typically placed slightly lower to show the usawashiito in front. Some shrines, such as Tsurugaoka Hachimangū, also cover the knot with an obi (sash).

The length of the obi is longer in the front and shorter in the back, but is usually equal on both sides. However, in the traditional twisted gake-hakama, the obi is different in length on either side. As mentioned above, the obi is tied with a single knot down the right side instead of at the front, with no additional waistband.

Traditionally, the fabric used was silk. Since the 1970s, materials such as poplin and synthetic fabrics have become common due to their ease of washing. The hibakama can be sewn as either lined or unlined. Lining is used only during winter, while the unlined version is often worn year-round.

== Overgarments ==
=== Chihaya ===
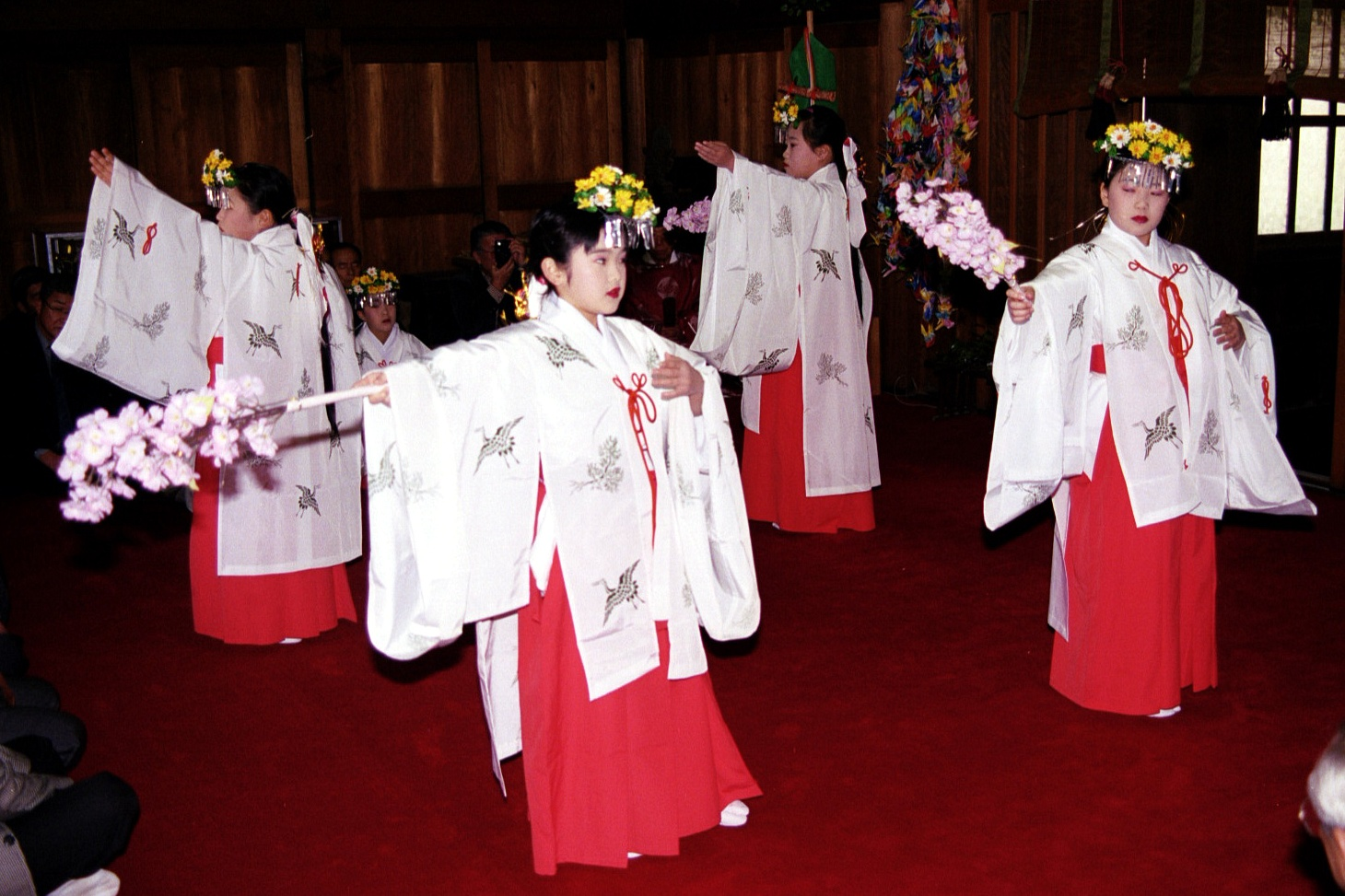
Chihaya used in a ceremony

When a miko is serving a Shinto ritual or performing kagura (a shrine maiden dance), she wears a chihaya over the top.

The chihaya has been used since ancient times, and was originally a plain white silk cloth with a vertical cut in the middle. Over time, it evolved to include two widths of silk as a costume for female officials, with unsewn sides and a munahimo cord holding the front. Later, sleeves were added and only the base of the shoulder sleeves were sewn in the current style. The sleeves of a chihaya do not have kukuri-himo embroidery or tassels, which are often seen in manga and other creative works.

Normally, the chihaya is made of thin white silk with a faint pattern and is fastened loosely with a vermilion munahimo cord, leaving the sides of the sleeves and of the body open below the armpits. Depending on the content of the ceremony, Chihaya with more ornate colors and patterns may be used. In addition, the sleeves, back, and the tips of the munahimo cord are decorated with musubikikukoji, chrysanthemum binding made from thread.

Chihaya can have a "Aozuri", and "Crane", "Turtle", "Pine", or "Chrysanthemum" design, often painted in green. In some cases, the god of the shrine's crest, cherry blossom, or plum are painted in vermilion or peach.

While silk was traditionally used to make chihaya, modern versions are often produced from synthetic fibers. The fabric is thicker than it looks, and extremely thin fabrics such as gauze, which can easily be seen through, are usually avoided.

=== Mo ===
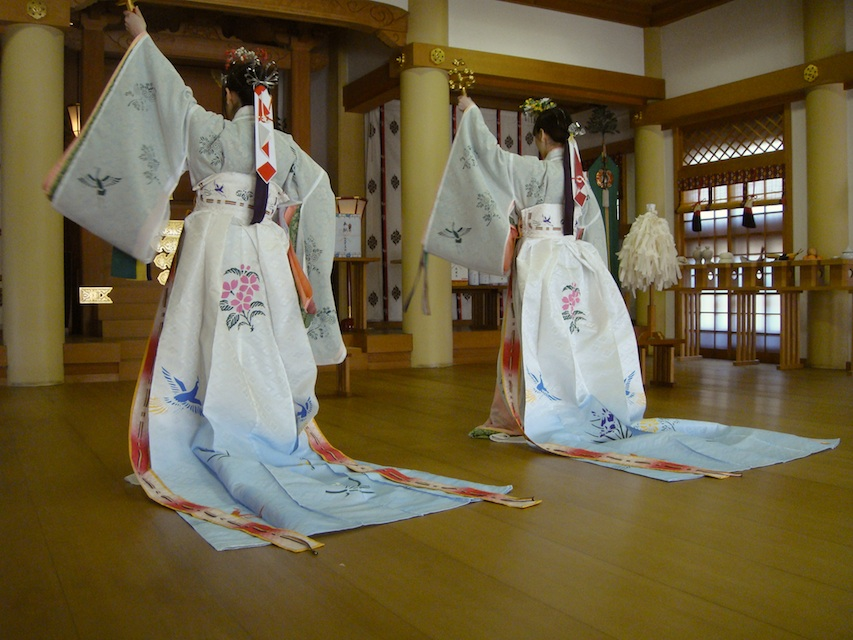
Mo (from Urayasu no Mai)

The mo (裳) is an ornament worn at the back of the waist in women's fine kimono. It is a cloth that is trailed from the waist and is occasionally used in the Urayasu dance, Kagura and other Shinto rituals.

The mo is typically white with plant and pine tree designs. It is characterized by long, thin pieces of cloth with stitching hang from each side.

=== Haori ===
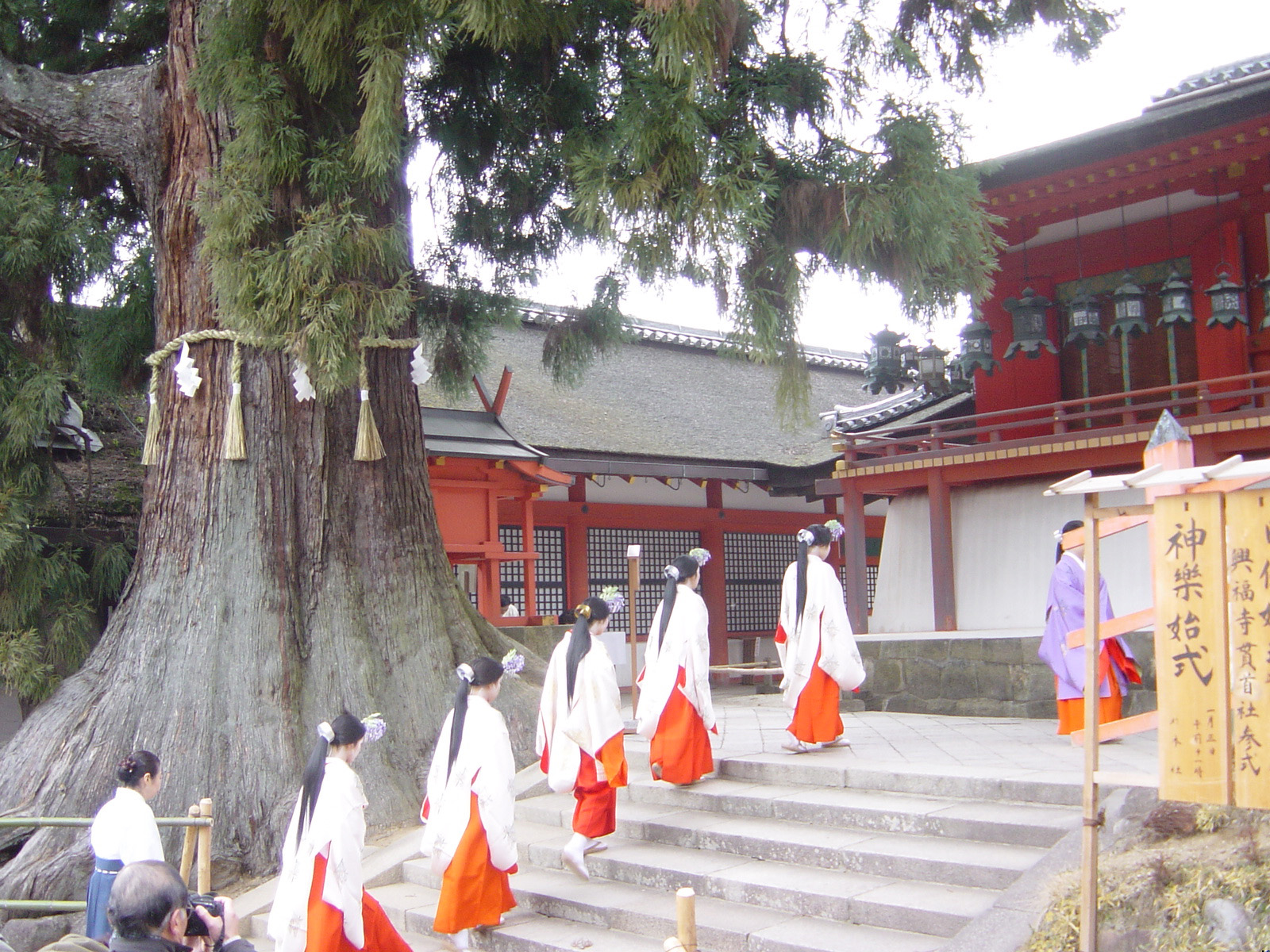
Mikos wearing Haori

In cold climates, miko may wear a haori (羽織) for protection against the cold. Wool-lined haori are widely available.

== Accessories ==
=== Hair ===
The long, black hair of a miko is often considered part of her costume and she is required to maintain it. Shrine maidens typically tie their hair into a ponytail with either takanaga, or mizuhiki washi paper. Mizuhiki is a type of string made from twisted paper that is dipped in glue, dried, and hardened. It is usually composed of several strands with the center dyed a different color. When used by miko, it is either red and white, or all white. Takanaga, on the other hand, can be white, gold and silver, gold and red, or white and red.

Depending on the specific ritual, a miko may also wear a decorative hair clip. If the hair is short, a hairpiece may be added to lengthen it, which is then covered by a hair clip.

In Kanda Shrine, instead of takanaga or mizuhiki, miko tie their hair back in a purple-colored bag-like hair clip called a "murasaki" (lit. purple).

=== Footwear ===
Miko typically wear tabi socks on their feet, along with zori sandals or white wooden (or black lacquered) geta sandals (with red or white straps). In contrast, female priests wear black lacquered wooden shoes called asagutsu. Nowadays, synthetic materials are allowed to be used as long as they have a good appearance.

In winter, miko often wear a double layer of tabi socks for warmth, and may also use hand warmers on the inside of the tabi socks.

=== Headdress ===
Head ornaments such as hanakanzashi, kazashi, and orieda hairpins and crowns, are worn during ceremonies. The kanzashi hairpin and its predecessor, the kasashira, have elements of both a hair clip and a hair ornament. These are said to be remnants of the ancient practice of inserting flowers and twigs in hair to bring in the spiritual power of trees, although modern versions are often made with artificial flowers or metal.

Crowns were originally a sign of status, but female priests now used saishi, and miko wear tengan (heavenly crown) when dancing. There are two types of crowns: a full crown and a tiara-style crown called maetengan.

Female Shinto priests may also wear a nukaate, a forehead covering, depending on the ritual.

At shrines where Ebisu festival is held, such as Osaka Tenmangū and Imamiya Ebisu Shrine, miko sometimes wears a gold Ebisu hat.

== Alternative clothing ==
=== Suikan ===
In certain rituals, the suikan (水干) may be worn as a miko costume. The suikan became a regular costume during World War II, when a system of female priesthood was established, but was later removed from the official dress code in 1987. However, the suikan is still occasionally used as a costume for female priests and miko.

== Props ==
Traditional miko tools include the Azusa Yumi (梓弓, "catalpa bow"), the tamagushi (玉串) (offertory sakaki-tree branches), and the Gehōbako (外法箱, Occult Box). Miko also use bells, drums, candles, gohei, and bowls of rice in ceremonies.

=== Torimono ===
During rituals or dances, a miko may use a prop called a torimono in her hand. The ritual of handing a torimono from a miko to a dancer during a Kagura dance is called Takarimode.

Common torimono items include sakaki, gohei, staff, sasa, yumi, sword, hoko yari, hishaku, and kudzu (kadsura). Depending on the shrine, bells, fans, and trays are also widely used.

Kagura-zuzu bells are made to look like ears of rice, while hoko-suzu (also known as hokosaki-mai-suzu) are bells shaped like spears. There are also tesuzu (hand bells) with handles. Kagura bells have 15 bells (3, 5, and 7 from the top), hoko-suzu have 8 bells under the tsuba, and tezuzu have 1 bell at the end of the handle. Many of these bells are adorned with a five-colored hanging cloth (bell cord) attached to the bottom of the handle.

The fan used in some rituals is typically a hinoki fan (hiyougi). The women's version, called Akome Ougi (袙扇), is decorated with motifs such as white sand and green pine trees, and features artificial flowers and a braided cord attached to the end.

=== Sake vessels, etc. ===
Although not included in the collection, there are sake sets used by miko to hold omiki and toso, which are used in ceremonies such as Shinto weddings.

The choshi (sake bottle) and heishi (ceramic bottle) are used for pouring sake. Choshi for Shinto rituals are made of metal like tin, copper or brass, and differ from the tokuri, which are made of ceramic. Choshi are double-sided choshi with handles and are decorated with engraving, with some finished with gold leaf or gilding. For celebratory occasions, the top of the choshi (sake bottle) may be decorated with twigs of pine needles or red and white mizuhiki (decorative cords).

The recipient's sake cup can be either round or square in shape. These cups are usually made of pottery or lacquerware. In ancient times they were made of unglazed earthenware (kawarake) and were disposable.

In some shrines, miko carry kinchaku (small purses) to hold their personal belongings.

== Female priesthood ==
Following the Meiji Restoration, the Japanese government excluded women from Shinto priesthood. However, due to the shortage of priests during and after World War II, women were allowed to serve as priests once again. To formalize the role of female priests, the government introduced elements of the traditional koshiro costume, incorporating white cloth with twisted gusset hakama, as well as omoshiro and karagoromo garments worn over it as part of the official clothes. In 1987, the suikan was abolished, and the omote-gown was adopted as the standard attire for female Shinto priests.

== Bibliography ==
- 林美一『時代風俗考証事典』河出書房新社, 1977年 ISBN 4-309-22367-2
- 江馬 努『風俗史図録 別巻』中央公論社, 1982年 ISBN 4-12-402713-3
- 上田正昭・編『平安京から京都へ』小学館, 1994年 ISBN 4-09-387132-9
- 小山雲鶴・マンガ技法研究会『衣服の描き方「メイド・巫女編」』グラフィック社, 2001年 ISBN 4-7661-1214-8
- 佐野 祐『平成の巫女』原書房, 2003年ISBN 4-562-03719-9
- 岡田桃子『神社若奥日記』祥伝社, 2004年 ISBN 4-396-31339-X
- 近藤好和『装束の日本史』平凡社, 2007年 ISBN 978-4-582-85357-5
- 神田明神『巫女さん入門 初級編』朝日新聞出版, 2008年 ISBN 978-4-02-250457-9
- 神田明神『巫女さん作法入門』朝日新聞出版, 2011年 ISBN 978-4-02-250883-6
- 朱鷺田祐介『図解 巫女』新紀元社, 2011年（F-FILES No.28） ISBN 978-4-7753-0562-1
- 民俗工芸『神祭具便覧40巻』, 2016年
- Fairchild, William P. "Shamanism in Japan", Folklore Studies 21:1–122. (1962)

== See also ==
- Kimono
