= Aero Fighters Assault =

1997 video game

- North American cover art
- Developer: Paradigm Entertainment
- Publishers: NA: Vic Tokai; JP/EU: Video System
- Series: Aero Fighters
- Platform: Nintendo 64
- Release: NA: November 21, 1997; JP: March 19, 1998; EU: April 12, 1998
- Genre: Combat flight simulation
- Modes: Single-player, multiplayer

Aero Fighters Assault (Note: known in Japan as Sonic Wings Assault (ソニックウィングス アサルト, Sonikku Wingusu Asaruto)) is a 1997 combat flight simulation video game developed by Paradigm Entertainment and published by Vic Tokai for the Nintendo 64. It is the first and only game in the Aero Fighters series with 3D computer graphics, as well as the sixth and final title of the series before Video System filed for bankruptcy in 2001. The game pits a group of four pilots against the fictional world-dominating organization Phutta Morgana.

== Gameplay ==
Screenshot of Level 2, "Pacific Ocean"

Mission objectives must be completed within a time limit. Points are awarded for having all wingmen survive, how many defensive countermeasures and special weapons the player has remaining, and how many hits the plane has remaining when the stage ends. In many cases, earning high point values unlocks a bonus mission during gameplay, with a total of four bonus missions in all.

There are four aircraft to choose from at the beginning, each with a different special weapon and missile type. Two more aircraft can be unlocked; one via push-button code, and the other by successfully completing all of the missions in the game including the bonus missions. The aircraft paint scheme for the four main characters is changeable by pushing the R-button in the selection screen. Additional planes can also be unlocked for the multiplayer mode based on progress in the single-player campaign.

The game also features a two-player deathmatch option in which two players face off against each other.

== Reception ==
Reception

Aggregate score
Aggregator	Score
GameRankings	59%

Review scores
Publication	Score
Electronic Gaming Monthly	7/10 (Note: In Electronic Gaming Monthly's review of the game, the four individual critics gave it scores of 7.0/10, 7.5/10, 7.5/10, and 6/10.)
Famitsu	27/40
Game Informer	6/10
GameSpot	5.4/10
Hyper	70%
IGN	5/10
N64 Magazine	(US) 60% (EU) 58%
Next Generation	3/5
Nintendo Power	6.9/10

Aero Fighters Assault received mostly mediocre reviews. Commentary varied considerably from critic to critic, though the more common criticisms included the music and the inane dialogue of the voice clips. A number of reviews praised the diversity of the missions, but some found that the overall formula of enemy jets, boss, enemy jets, boss to be repetitive and unengaging. Most also remarked that while the graphics are appealing in still shots, with impressive effects, the frame rate is choppy enough to hurt both the visual appeal and gameplay.

The game's flight models, controls, and third person perspective during dogfights were all widely praised. Nonetheless, overall assessments were dismal, with most comparing it unfavorably to its PlayStation competitor Ace Combat 2 and/or to Paradigm's previous Nintendo 64 offering, Pilotwings 64. GamePro found the controls difficult and the overall slowness of the game frustrating. (Note: GamePro gave the game 4.5/5 for graphics, 4.0/5 for sound, and 3.0/5 for both control and fun factor.) Next Generation said: "All in all, the game needs more high-intensity dogfight levels, realism instead of science fiction trappings, and less linearity. Had the gameplay matched its flight model, Aero Fighters Assault would have been a real gem. But as it is, the game's not quite a diamond in the rough".

Nintendo Power found the game often interesting and impressive in single-player mode but tedious in multiplayer mode, and concluded it is overall respectable but does not outdo the flight sims available on PC as completely as might have been hoped. GameSpot and IGN both concluded that the game has some solid features but simply lacks fun, with IGN describing it as "dreadfully average and [lacking] the balance of many N64 games". Contrarily, three of Electronic Gaming Monthly's four reviewers found the game to be fun once one gets past its flaws, though they allowed that it was not as polished as other titles, and the remaining reviewer, Shawn Smith, said the fun it offers is fleeting.
