= Battle K-Road =

1994 video game

- Japanese arcade flyer
- Developer: Psikyo
- Publishers: Psikyo; Jaleco
- Platform: Arcade
- Release: January 1994
- Genre: Fighting
- Modes: Single-player, multiplayer
- Arcade system: Psikyo 1st Generation

Battle K-Road (バトルクロード, Battoru Kei Rodo) is a one-on-one fighting arcade video game developed by Psikyo in 1993 and released as well as published under Jaleco's partnership in Japan for the arcades in 1994.

== Gameplay ==
Screenshot of Battle K-Road

The game focuses mostly on reality fighting rather than fictional fighting. At the start of the game in one-player mode, the player will face against the other fighter that uses the same fighting style as the one the player chose. After the player wins against the opponent, the player will face against other opponents that use other fighting styles in the K-Road Tournament. If the player loses, the game will only allow the player to continue fighting through it with the character he used, and will not allow the player to choose another character.

The gameplay has a 6-button layout, but with command inputs different compared to ones in most fighting games released at the time. There are three punches and kicks for a few directions (weak, medium and strong). There are seven fighting styles featured in the game and two playable characters per style, for a total of 14 playable fighters.

=== Fighters ===
Karate

- (Switzerland) Anthony Hawk
- (Japan) Masamichi Ohyama

Boxing

- (Australia) Rick Simpson
- (United States) Jeff Howard

Muay Thai

- (Japan) Shinsaku Maekawa
- (United Kingdom) John Anderson

Commando Sambo

- (Russia) Wolf
- (United States) Dan

Mixed martial arts

- (Germany) Cyborg D-9F
- (United States) Cyborg T-8P

Sumo

- (Japan) Mitsuji Tanimachi
- (Brazil) Harimaoh

Jujutsu

- (United States) Tyssa Willing
- (Japan) Yuki Fujiwara

Other

- Mr. Bear - the final boss of the game. Some of his moves resemble Ryu from Capcom's Street Fighter series.

== Reception ==
In Japan, Game Machine listed Battle K-Road on their March 1, 1994 issue as being the tenth most-successful table arcade unit of the month.

== See also ==
- List of fighting games
