= Strikers 1945 Plus =

1999 video game

- Developer: Psikyo
- Publisher: SNK
- Composer: Masaki Izutani
- Series: Strikers 1945
- Platforms: Arcade, PlayStation Portable
- Release: WW: December 24, 1999
- Genre: Scrolling shooter
- Modes: Single-player, multiplayer
- Arcade system: Neo Geo MVS

Strikers 1945 Plus (Note: Japanese: ストライカーズ 1945 PLUS, Hepburn: Sutoraikāzu 1945 PLUS) is a 1999 vertically scrolling shooter video game developed by Psikyo and published by SNK for the Neo Geo arcade platform. It is a remake of Strikers 1945 II, which was released earlier in 1997 on multiple platforms. In the game, players choose one of the six fighter planes to fight against the F.G.R. organization, who leaked information of weapons by the now-disbanded C.A.N.Y. forces. Though first released in arcades, the game was later ported and re-released through download services to other platforms, each one featuring various changes compared to the original version.

== Gameplay ==
Arcade version screenshot, showing a P-38 Lightning engaging in a battle against Battle Air Ship Iron Casket.

Strikers 1945 Plus is a vertically scrolling shoot 'em up game similar to Strikers 1945 II, where players chooses one of the six World War II-era fighter planes through eight stages, with the first four being played in random order. Players collect weapon power-ups, bombs and gold bars for points. Each plane is equipped with a unique "supershot", which is charged by damaging enemies and fired by holding then releasing the fire button. Supershots can be stored but the number varies from plane to plane. Using a bomb results in a large friendly fighter swooping onto the screen and blocking shots while returning fire for a few seconds. Unlike previous entries, Plus is played on a horizontal screen but in a cropped view with each side showing a status bar, while alterations to the gameplay had been made. A respawn system where players immediately starts at the location they died at is used. A hit by enemy fire results in losing a life, as well as a penalty of decreasing the plane's firepower to his original state and the game is over once all lives are lost, unless the players insert more credits into the arcade machine to continue playing.

== Synopsis ==
It is winter of 1945 and the Strikers have successfully eliminated C.A.N.Y.'s forces. The fierce fight was considered a militarist coup d'état disapproving the acceptance of the Potsdam Declaration. The threat posed by C.A.N.Y. enshrouded the world in the shadow of war. Meanwhile, data on C.A.N.Y.'s new weapons, tightly sealed by the US Department of Defense was leaked by a new organization, codenamed "F.G.R.", threatening to drag the world into the chaos of war once again with it. Upon learning of the situation, the Strikers, who had been appointed as a new weapons development experimental unit, were convened once again as protectors of the world.

== Release ==
Strikers 1945 Plus was first released by SNK for the Neo Geo MVS board on December 24, 1999. A PlayStation Portable port titled Strikers 1945 Plus Portable was released in China in February 2009 and was later released by PM Studios as a downloadable title on July 30, 2009 in North America, while a physical version was published in Japan. In December 2009, an iOS version was also released by WindySoft. Hamster Corporation re-released the game as part of their ACA Neo Geo series for the PlayStation 4, Xbox One, Nintendo Switch and Windows.

== Reception ==
Reception

Aggregate score
Aggregator	Score
Metacritic	(PSP) 53/100

Review scores
Publication	Score
GameFan	(Arcade) 82/100
GameSpot	(PSP) 5.0/10
IGN	(PSP) 4.8/10

In Japan, Game Machine listed Strikers 1945 Plus on their March 15, 2000 issue as being the sixteenth most-successful arcade game of the month.
