= Sonic Wings Special =

1996 video game

- Sega Saturn cover art
- Developer: Video System
- Publisher: MediaQuest
- Programmer: Yukio Kaneda
- Composer: Naoki Itamura
- Series: Aero Fighters
- Platforms: Sega Saturn, PlayStation, Arcade
- Release: JP: July 5, 1996
- Genre: Scrolling shooter
- Modes: Single-player, multiplayer

Sonic Wings Special (Note: Japanese: ソニックウイングス スペシャル, Hepburn: Sonikku Uingusu Supesharu) is a 1996 vertically scrolling shooter video game developed by Video System and published by MediaQuest for the PlayStation and Sega Saturn. It is the fourth installment in the Aero Fighters series. It was ported to arcades as Sonic Wings Limited (Aero Fighters Special in North America).

== Gameplay ==
=== Fighters ===
There are 7 teams, 14 pilots, and 26 fighters in this game, with each team consisting of 2 members, and a choice of 2 fighters per pilot, except the secret team, which has 1 fighter per pilot.

Once a player has chosen a team, the other player can only choose a pilot and fighter of the respective team.

Team	Pilot	Normal fighter	Secret fighter
USA	Blaster Keaton/Mecha-Keaton	Lockheed F117 Sea Hawk	Vought F4-U Corsair
USA	Captain Silver	Fairchild Republic A-10 Thunderbolt II	Northrop P-61 Black Widow
Japan	Hien	Mitsubishi FS-X	Nakajima J1N Gekkou
Japan	Mao Mao	McDonnell Douglas F-15	Aichi M6A Seiran
Russia	Volk	Kamov Ka-50 Hokum	Mikoyan-Gurevich Mig 3
Russia	Chaika & Pooshika	Ilyushin IL-102	Ilyushin IL-2 Stormovik
Sweden	Kowful the Viking	Saab AJ-37 Viggen	Junkers Ju 87G Stuka
Sweden	T.B. A-10	Lockheed F-104 Star Fighter	Brewster B-239 Buffalo
P.K.F.	Whity	Northrop YF-23	Henschel Hs129
P.K.F.	Lord River N. White	McDonnell Douglas AV-8 Harrier II Plus	Boulton Paul Defiant
NATO	Anjera	Dassault Rafale M	Dewoitine D520
NATO	Ellen & Cincia	Grumman F-14 Tomcat	Fairey Sword Fish
Secret	Kotomi	Aka-Usagi	-
Secret	The Man	Lamborghini Diablo (Diabloon)	-

A pilot's secret fighter is unlocked by completing the game with the chosen pilot.

The NATO and Secret teams are unlocked by unlocking all secret fighters in the US, Japan, Russia, Sweden, and P.K.F. teams.

=== Stages ===
There are 17 stages in this game, but only 9 are playable at a time. After completing stage 1, 3 stages are randomly chosen out of 5. The game includes a branching system that allows players to choose 1 of 2 branches after completing stages 5, 7, or 8.

If a secret fighter is chosen, alternate versions of the stages appear instead.

== PlayStation version ==
It allows saving the game for more than once per round, while the PAL version does not support the PS1 Memorycard at all.

Hamster Corporation released the PlayStation version as part of their Console Archives series for the Nintendo Switch 2 and PlayStation 5 in March 2026.

== Arcade version ==
There are 6 teams, 12 pilots, and 12 fighters in this version. There are 10 stages but only 7 are playable per game. After completing Stage 4, Stage 5 and 6 are chosen depending on the player's performance. After completing Stage 6, one of Fight in Orbit, Another Dimension, or Mars becomes Stage 7, depending on the player's performance. In Fight in Orbit, Another Dimension, 1 of 2 different final bosses appear in the end. If all lives are lost in Stage 7, continuing causes the game to start at the beginning of a stage. If one of the five last stage bosses is not defeated before it escapes, a boss-specific failure ending is shown. A character-specific ending is shown if the final Stage 7 boss is defeated, and a stage-specific ending is shown. After an item is revealed, the point value of the item increases the longer it stays on screen. The point value progresses at the sequence of 100, 200, 500, 1000, 2000, 4000, and 10000 (maximum) points.

== Reception ==
Reception

Review scores
Publication	Score
Computer and Video Games	1/5
Super GamePower	3.5
