= Zero Gunner 2 =

2001 video game

- Japanese Dreamcast cover art featuring Comanche, Hokum, and Apache
- Developers: Psikyo; Zerodiv (Nintendo Switch, Windows, PlayStation 4, Xbox One)
- Publishers: Psikyo; Zerodiv (Nintendo Switch, Windows, PlayStation 4, Xbox One); Mobirix (iOS, Android)
- Director: Shinsuke Nakamura
- Designers: Hideyuki Oda; Ikuya Yoshida; Keizou Fujita; Narumi Tauchi; Norikazu Kudo; Hideki Yoshida; Yoko Tsukagoshi; Tōru Sakurai; Daisuke Kato; Yukihiro Morishita
- Programmers: Kenichi Fujita; Kunihiko Nogomi; Michiaki Negoro
- Composers: Masaki Izutani; Kaori Kumakura
- Platforms: Arcade, Dreamcast, Nintendo Switch, Microsoft Windows, iOS, Android, PlayStation 4, Xbox One
- Release: JP: May 2001 (arcade); JP: September 6, 2001 (Dreamcast); JP: January 18, 2018 (Switch); WW: January 25, 2018 (Switch); WW: December 21, 2020 (Windows); WW: July 13, 2022 (PlayStation 4); WW: January 11, 2023 (Xbox One)
- Genre: Shoot 'em up
- Modes: Single player, multiplayer
- Arcade system: Sega NAOMI

Zero Gunner 2 (ゼロガンナー2) is a 3D multidirectional shooter developed by Psikyo as a sequel to Zero Gunner, the original arcade game. It was released for the Dreamcast in Japan in 2001.

A version of this game was developed and released in 2018 for the Nintendo Switch, by Zerodiv. This version was given the title Zero Gunner 2- as Zerodiv had to rebuild the game almost from scratch, due to the original data being missing, and out of respect for both the original version of the game and purists. This version was later released for Microsoft Windows via Steam in December 2020, PlayStation 4 in July 2022 and Xbox One in January 2023.

== Story ==
In the near future, an Asian conglomerate known as Igem develops a unique energy source capable of developing a number of innovative machines. Their over-abundant research with the energy leads to the construction of a weather control machine called ONI, developed entirely for the purpose of taking over the world. Once ONI is activated, the countries of the world suffer and Igem's secret militia move in to destroy any opposition. It is here that the Zero Gunner squadron is called into action to stop Igem and to destroy ONI.

== Gameplay ==
One or two players can take their pick of three helicopters, each with their own firing pattern and battle oncoming waves of enemies through 7 different stages, each with a boss at the end. Each boss has a different form at the beginning, such as a train, boat, airplane, or submarine, but after the players have inflicted enough damage, it turns into a giant robot. After the players destroy the robot, the stage ends and they progress on to the new stage. There are 9 modes of difficulty, ranging from "Child", where enemies fire little to none when fired upon to "Very Hard", where enemies fire at almost any given moment.

The game is particularly innovative by including a way to rotate the helicopter in 360 degrees, allowing the player to fire in any direction. Most of the time this is required to survive, as enemies not only come from the top of the screen, but the left, right, and bottom as well. Like other scrolling shooters, the game makes use of power-ups to improve a helicopter's firepower. Each player also has a "Special" Bar, which slowly rises whenever players collect the little "E" icons from destroyed enemies. Every time the bar fills, the player has an opportunity to unleash their helicopter's special attack which often is capable of destroying every enemy on the screen. The first 4 stages, either Alpine Armored Train, Submergence City, Sea of Cloud, or Marine Base, are chosen in random order. The last 3 stages, Asian Slum, Orbital Elevator, and Aerial Capital, are in a set order. Helicopters are:

- the Comanche, which is blue and has lasers as its main weapon.
- the Apache, which is dark green and has blue bullets and straight-firing missiles as its weaponry.
- the Hokum, which is yellow and is the best helicopter, considering it has guided missiles, bullets that deal high damage, and a Special Attack that is 99 rounds and includes small planes that fire at the enemy and follow you around.

== Reception ==
In Japan, Game Machine listed Zero Gunner 2 on their July 15, 2001 issue as being the eighth most-successful arcade game of the month.

On release, Famitsu magazine scored the Dreamcast version of the game a 30 out of 40.
