= Zero Gunner =

1997 video game

- Developer: Psikyo
- Publisher: Psikyo
- Platform: Arcade
- Release: December 1997
- Genre: Shoot 'em up
- Modes: Single player, multiplayer
- Arcade system: Sega Model 2

Zero Gunner (ゼロガンナー) is a shoot 'em up developed by Psikyo and released in 1997. The arcade game allows for eight-way movement using a joystick and supports up to two players at a time. Its lock on targeting mechanic allows players to rotate around targets. The game was succeeded by a sequel, Zero Gunner 2 for the Sega NAOMI and Dreamcast.

== Gameplay ==
Gameplay screenshot

Zero Gunner is a horizontally-scrolling shoot 'em up, with players tasked to evade and destroy enemies as they automatically advance across the environments. Players choose from one of three helicopters: a Cobra helicopter, an Apache helicopter, and a helicopter gunship. Regardless of which craft is chosen, it is equipped with a basic single shot and a more powerful sonic wave which sweeps across the entire screen.

Players can lock-on to opponents, which allows them to freely maneuver around the screen while continuing to shoot the same target.

== Plot ==
In 2016, worldwide martial law is initiated when a widespread terrorist organization overthrows and takes control of the world's military authorities. A group of ace helicopter pilots are secretly amassed in a special forces squadron called ZERO to travel around the world and destroy the occupied terrorist forces.

== Reception ==
In Japan, Game Machine listed Zero Gunner on their February 15, 1998 issue as being the sixth most-successful arcade game at the time.
