= Gunbird Special Edition =

2004 video game

Gunbird 1 & 2 Gunbird Special Edition
- European cover art
- Developer(s): Psyworks
- Publisher(s): JP: Atlus; EU: Xplosiv
- Producer(s): Takayuki Harakami
- Programmer(s): Kenji Terasaka; Haruo Suzuki; Toshiharu Sato; Sunao Matsumoto
- Artist(s): Yoshiko Ishida
- Composer(s): Yoshiyuki Ueda
- Series: Gunbird
- Platform(s): PlayStation 2
- Release: PlayStation 2: JP: 19 February 2004; EU: 18 March 2005; UK: 30 March 2005
- Genre(s): Scrolling shooter
- Mode(s): Single-player, multiplayer

Gunbird Special Edition (Gunbird 1 & 2 in Japan) is a compilation scrolling shooter video game for the PlayStation 2 that includes the arcade versions of Psikyo's Gunbird (1994) and Gunbird 2 (1998). It was developed by Psyworks and published by Atlus in Japan in 2004 and by Xplosiv in Europe in 2005. New features include eight difficulty settings, an adjustable view option (letter boxed and vertical, full screen and horizontal), and the Practice Mode.

== Reception ==
Gunbird Special Edition received generally moderately positive reviews. Retro Gamer awarded it seven stars of ten: "If you’re after a good-looking old-skool blaster, and have superhuman skills, then you'll want to show your mates exactly what you can do with this". NowGamer gave it a score of 7.7/10: "Neither game is short of bullets or personality – you just have to be prepared to look past the dated visuals". Jeuxvideo.com, however, was much more critical of the game; they scored it only 9/20 and recommended buying Gradius V instead.
