= Japanese ship Chihaya =

The following Japanese ships have been named Chihaya:

- Japanese cruiser Chihaya, an Imperial Japanese Navy unprotected cruiser in service from 1900 to 1929
- Chihaya, an Akitsushima-class seaplane tender which was scrapped incomplete on slip after 1942
- JDS Chihaya, a submarine rescue vessel of the Japan Maritime Self-Defense Force in service from 1960 to 1989
- JS Chihaya, a submarine rescue vessel launched in 1998

== Chiyaha Maru ==
- Chiyaha Maru (oiler), a Chiyoda Maru-class oiler of the Imperial Japanese Army operating from 1943 to 1944
- Chihaya Maru, a Tjisaroea-class cargo liner from Batavia, captured by the Imperial Japanese Navy.
- Chihaya Maru (2000), a cement carrier launched in 2000
