= Samurai Aces =

1993 video game

Sengoku Ace
- Japanese arcade flyer
- Developers: Psikyo (Arcade); APXSoft (Mobile)
- Publishers: Banpresto (Arcade); Taito, 505 Games (PS2); Noritong (Mobile)
- Designer: Shinsuke Nakamura
- Programmers: Shinsuke Nakamura; Hiroshi Yamada; Shiori Saito
- Artist: Hirofumi Nakamura
- Composer: Masaki Izutani
- Series: Sengoku Ace
- Platforms: Arcade, PlayStation 2, Mobile, Nintendo Switch, Microsoft Windows, PlayStation 4, Xbox One
- Release: April 22, 1993 (Arcade); December 2, 2004 (PS2); February 15, 2018 (Switch); May 20, 2020 (Windows); July 27, 2022 (PS4 & XONE)
- Genre: Scrolling shooter
- Mode: Up to 2 players (co-op)
- Arcade system: Psikyo 1st Generation

Sengoku Ace (Sengoku Ace (戦国エース, Sengoku Ēsu)), fully titled Sengoku Ace: Tengai Episode I and also known as Samurai Aces in the English version, is a vertically scrolling shooter released in the arcades by Psikyo in 1993. The first game by Psikyo, Sengoku Ace was designed by Shinsuke Nakamura, the creator of Aero Fighters (Sonic Wings) and the company's founder.

== Gameplay ==
Samurai Aces is a pseudo military-to-fantasy-themed vertically scrolling shoot 'em up game.

== Plot ==
The science fantasy story of Sengoku Ace resolves around the six Feudal Japan (Sengoku period) characters sent on a mission to stop an evil cult and rescue the Shogun's kidnapped daughter, princess Tsukihime (Moon Princess), before she can be used as a sacrifice to resurrect their demon god. The game features 21 endings, different for various characters and two-player pairings.

=== Characters ===
- Flush (Flash) / Ayin / Aine (閃光のアイン) - a 25-year-old, one-eyed, blonde samurai flying a J7W, who is looking for his sister Asuka. He is voiced by Hisao Egawa.
- Gen / Gennai (からくり屋 源内) - a 77-year-old scientist with a small robot assistant named Ranmaru, who flies a small, agile "Super Fighter" plane that resembles an X-wing starfighter from Star Wars. He is voiced by Daisuke Gōri.
- Jane Hayate (はやてのジェーン) - a 21-year-old blonde and blue-eyed beautiful female ninja who flies a glider. She is voiced by Hiroko Emori.
- Kenno (Kenno Maru) / Kenoumaru / Ohmaru (犬王丸) - a "super genius dog" flying a high-tech YF-23 aircraft (according to some of his team play endings, really a young man sealed in a dog form).
- Koyori Togashi (富樫こより) - Called Miko in western releases, she is a tomboyish 17-year-old shrine maiden with a fascination for money, who flies a biplane. Voiced by Hiroko Emori.
- Tengai (Tengai Kano) (ターボ坊主 天外) - a 50-year-old Japanese Buddhist wandering monk who flies a bizarre bird-like plane. He is also voiced by Daisuke Gōri.

== Reception ==
Reception

Aggregate score
Aggregator	Score
Metacritic	(NS) 71/100

Review score
Publication	Score
Nintendo Life	(NS) 8/10

In Japan, Game Machine listed Samurai Aces on their June 1, 1993 issue as being the fourth most-popular arcade game for the previous two weeks. On Nintendo Switch, it garnered "mixed or average" reviews, according to review aggregator Metacritic.

== Legacy ==
The original and arranged soundtrack for the game (GCD-1) was released by Shinseisha on January 22, 1994. The game's manga adaptation titled Sengoku Ace - Ataru Kadiba (戦国エース - かぢば あたる) (ISBN 4-88199-140-X) was published by Shinseisha in the Gamest Comics series on December 25, 1994.

In December 2004, the game was released for the PlayStation 2 as part of the Psikyo Shooting Collection Vol. 2: Sengoku Ace & Sengoku Blade by Taito and 505 Games. It was also re-released one year later as a budget-range title. In 2018, it was also released for the Nintendo Switch. In 2022, the original arcade version was included as part of the Sega Astro City Mini V, a vertically-oriented variant of the Sega Astro City mini console.

Sengoku Ace was followed by two sequels, Sengoku Blade: Sengoku Ace Episode II in 1996 and Sengoku Cannon: Sengoku Ace Episode III in 2004. The Sengoku series characters, along with the ones from Psikyo's Gunbird series, later joined up with several Capcom characters (especially from the Street Fighter fame) in the crossover game Taisen Net Gimmick: Capcom & Psikyo All Stars, released for the Dreamcast in 2001.

== Sources ==
- Official website (characters page)
