= Strikers 1945 III =

1999 video game

- Developers: Psikyo; Windysoft (iOS/Android)
- Publishers: Psikyo; Mobirix (iOS/Android; until 2019); S&C Entertainment (iOS/Android; 2019-present)
- Director: Naozumi Yorichika
- Producer: Shinsuke Nakamura
- Designers: Naozumi Yorichika; Hideyuki Oda; Norikazu Takemori
- Artist: Yoshiyuki Takani
- Composers: Masaki Izutani; Kensuke Satoh
- Series: Strikers 1945
- Platforms: Arcade, iOS, Android, Nintendo Switch, Microsoft Windows, PlayStation 4, Xbox One
- Release: 1999 (Arcade); 2015 (Android): JP: August 29, 2019 (Switch); WW: July 30, 2020 (Windows); WW: July 13, 2022 (PS4 & XONE); WW: July 27, 2022 (Switch)
- Genre: Scrolling shooter
- Mode: Up to 2 players simultaneously
- Arcade system: Psikyo SH2

Strikers 1945 III, also known as Strikers 1999 (ストライカーズ1999) in Japan, is a vertically scrolling shoot 'em up game developed and originally released by Psikyo in 1999 for the arcades. The game is a sequel to Strikers 1945 II, chronologically taking place 54 years after the first two games in the series.

== Gameplay ==
In-game screenshot depicting an F-22 Raptor battling Specter on the USA stage

The player chooses from one of six modern jet fighter aircraft and shoots through eight stages (the first four levels are randomly chosen, and the last four remain the same for each play). Once the game is beaten, a report showing the statistics of the player are displayed, and the game 'loops' with the difficulty much higher. Each game (on default settings) begins with three lives, and an extra life is earned at 600,000 (or 800,000). When all lives are lost, the option to continue is given but the score is reset.

Another latest feature is the Technical Bonus. During a boss battle, a blue orb is revealed as the weak point. In order to get a 'quick kill', the fighter plane must be extremely close to the orb until it turns red by firing the orb while getting it close to it. Once the fighter plane 'embraces' the orb, the boss is destroyed quickly and adds points for the technical bonus. However revealing the orb from the boss will only take once when it unleashes an attack pattern that is also its weakness. For players, they have to memorize the attack pattern and shoot the orb while getting close to it for a quick victory.

Power-Ups are released by shooting certain enemies. When a power up is collected, the player's normal shot becomes more powerful and a secondary shot may become available to the player. Up to three power ups can be collected, any after that are worth 4000 points. It is possible to 'power down' at any time by colliding with an enemy craft.

At the beginning of the game, the player has a stock of two bombs. By destroying certain enemy craft, a bomb icon will be released and bounce around the screen. When collected, another bomb will be added to the player's stock.

The game featured the F/A-18 Super Hornet, F-22 Raptor, F-4 Phantom II, F-117 Stealth and the AV-8 Harrier as playable planes, with the X-36 being available as a secret plane via DIP-switch configurations. On September 30, 1998, during the development it was also revealed by Psikyo that the Sukhoi Su-47 was originally planned as a secret plane too, but it didn't make in the final product for unknown reasons.

== Plot ==
54 years after the end of the last game, an extraterrestrial swarm of microscopic robots, called "nanites", have invaded earth and infiltrated military bases in every country, including F.G.R.'s forces. All military vehicles infected by these robots became fully automated and began indiscriminate attacks on every country in the world, resulting in mass devastation. The small number of military craft that have not been infiltrated yet by the small robots have been recovered. A small combat force has been assembled to fight against the entire world. Losing contact with military headquarters, the Strikers appear once again to save the world.

== Reception ==
In Japan, Game Machine listed Strikers 1945 III on their 15 November 1999 issue as being the fourth most-successful arcade game of the month.
