= Psikyo =

Japanese video game development and publishing company

- Native name: 彩京
- Romanized name: Saikyō
- Type: Public
- Industry: Video games
- Founded: 1992
- Defunct: 2002
- Fate: Acquired by X-nauts
- Headquarters: Kyoto, Japan
- Key people: Shinsuke Nakamura (CEO)

Psikyo (彩京, Saikyō) was a Japanese video game developer and publisher known for its shoot 'em ups. It was founded in 1992 by former Video System staff who worked on the Aero Fighters series. Psikyo was mainly an arcade game developer, and ported some of their games to home consoles as well.

Psikyo was acquired by X-Nauts in 2002. In 2003, it was reported that Psikyo was shutting down. Shortly afterwards, X-Nauts stated this news was wrong, and that games would continue to be developed by its Psikyo division. In 2007, Psikyo programming veteran Keiyuki Haragami started a company called Zerodiv to handle distribution of Psikyo's catalog. In March 2019, Zerodiv was acquired by City Connection, but in February 2025, Edia, the current owner of Telenet Japan IPs, purchased Zerodiv from City Connection by a value of one million yen.

== Games ==
Release	Title	Genre	Original Platforms
1993	Sengoku Ace	Shooter	Arcade
1994	Battle K-Road	Fighting	Arcade
1994	Gunbird	Shooter	Arcade, PlayStation, Sega Saturn
1995	Strikers 1945	Shooter	Arcade, PlayStation, Sega Saturn
1996	Tengai (Sengoku Blade)	Shooter	Arcade, Sega Saturn
1997	Sol Divide	Shooter	Arcade, PlayStation, Sega Saturn
1997	Strikers 1945 II	Shooter	Arcade, PlayStation, Sega Saturn
1997	Taisen Hot Gimmick	Mahjong	Arcade
1997	Zero Gunner	Shooter	Arcade
1998	Yoshimoto Mahjong Club	Mahjong	Sega Saturn
1998	Gunbird 2	Shooter	Arcade, Dreamcast
1998	Pilot Kids	Shooter	Arcade
1998	Space Bomber	Shooter	Arcade
1998	Taisen Hot Gimmick Kairakuten	Mahjong	Arcade
1998	Daraku Tenshi – The Fallen Angels (publisher only)	Fighting	Arcade
1999	Strikers 1945 III	Shooter	Arcade
1999	Strikers 1945 Plus	Shooter	Arcade
1999	Taisen Hot Gimmick 3 Digital Surfing	Mahjong	Arcade
1999	Yoshimoto Mahjong Club Deluxe	Mahjong	PlayStation
2000	Cannon Spike (Gunspike)	Shooter	Arcade, Dreamcast
2000	Dragon Blaze	Shooter	Arcade
2000	Lode Runner - The Dig Fight	Action	Arcade
2000	Quiz de Idol! Hot Debut	Quiz	Arcade
2000	Taisen Hot Gimmick 4 Ever	Mahjong	Arcade
2000	Ikuze! Onsen Takkyū!!	Table tennis	PlayStation 2
2001	Gunbarich	Puzzle	Arcade
2001	Taisen Hot Gimmick Integral	Mahjong	Arcade
2001	Zero Gunner 2	Shooter	Arcade, Dreamcast
2001	Taisen Net Gimmick: Capcom & Psikyo All Stars	Mahjong	Dreamcast
2002	G-Taste	Mahjong	Arcade, PlayStation 2

=== Released with Psikyo label after acquisition ===
Release	Title	Platforms
2004	Taisen Hot Gimmick: Cosplay Mahjong	PlayStation 2
2005	Sengoku Cannon: Sengoku Ace Episode III	PSP
2005	Taisen Hot Gimmick: Axes-Jong	PlayStation 2
2016	Strikers 1945: World War	iOS, Android
2020	Strikers 1945 Collection	iOS, Android

=== Compilations ===
Release	Title	Platforms	Games
2004	Gunbird Special Edition (Gunbird 1&2)	PlayStation 2	Gunbird, Gunbird 2
2004	Psikyo Shooting Collection Vol. 1: Strikers 1945 I & II (1945 I & II: The Arcade Games)	PlayStation 2	Strikers 1945, Strikers 1945 II
2004	Psikyo Shooting Collection Vol. 2: Sengoku Ace & Sengoku Blade	PlayStation 2	Sengoku Ace, Tengai
2004	Psikyo Shooting Collection Vol. 3: Sol Divide & Dragon Blaze	PlayStation 2	Sol Divide, Dragon Blaze
2019	Psikyo Collection Vol. 1	Nintendo Switch	Strikers 1945, Gunbird, Sengoku Ace, Sol Divide
2019	Psikyo Collection Vol. 2	Nintendo Switch	Strikers 1945 II, Gunbird 2, Tengai, Dragon Blaze
2019	Psikyo Collection Vol. 3	Nintendo Switch	Strikers 1945 III, Gunbarich, Sengoku Cannon, Zero Gunner 2
2019	Psikyo Shooting Library Vol. 1 (Psikyo Shooting Stars Alpha)	Nintendo Switch, PlayStation 4	Strikers 1945, Strikers 1945 II, Strikers 1945 III, Sol Divide, Dragon Blaze, Zero Gunner 2
2019	Psikyo Shooting Library Vol. 2 (Psikyo Shooting Stars Bravo)	Nintendo Switch, PlayStation 4	Sengoku Ace, Tengai, Sengoku Cannon, Gunbird, Gunbird 2, Gunbarich
2027	Psikyo Memories	Nintendo Switch 2, PlayStation 5	Dragon Blaze, Gunbarich, Gunbird, Gunbird 2, Samurai Aces, Tengai, Samurai Aces III: Sengoku Cannon, Sol Divide, Strikers 1945, Strikers 1945 II, Strikers 1999, Zero Gunner 2
