= Sol Divide =

1997 video game

- Developers: Psikyo; Boom (PS/SS); Zerodiv (WIN/NS/PS4/XONE)
- Publishers: Psikyo: PlayStation; JP: Atlus; NA: XS Games Atlus (SS) PS2; JP: Taito; EU: 505 GameStreet Console Classics (WIN) City Connection (NS, PS4, XONE)
- Director: Hideyuki Oda
- Producer: Shinsuke Nakamura
- Designers: Daisuke Nobori; Emi Taniguchi; Hideyuki Oda
- Programmers: Hirohide Mizuochi; Hiroki Yanagisawa; Hiromi Yoshizawa
- Artist: Katsuya Terada
- Composers: Kenichi Hirata; Masaki Izutani
- Platform: Arcade: Windows, Nintendo Switch, PlayStation, PlayStation 2, PlayStation 4, Saturn, Xbox One
- Release: 1997: Arcade; JP: May 1997 PlayStation; JP: 2 July 1998; NA: 11 March 2003 Saturn; JP: 2 July 1998 PS2; JP: 24 February 2005; EU: 2006 Windows; WW: 13 July 2015 Switch; WW: 22 March 2018 PS4, Xbox One; WW: 29 June 2022
- Genre: Scrolling shooter
- Modes: Single-player, multiplayer
- Arcade system: Psikyo SH2

Sol Divide (Note: Japanese: ソルディバイド, Hepburn: Soru Dibaido) is a scrolling shooter developed by Psikyo and released as an arcade video game in 1997. Ports were published for the PlayStation, Sega Saturn, and later PlayStation 2, Microsoft Windows, Nintendo Switch, PlayStation 4, and Xbox One.

== Gameplay ==
Arcade version screenshot

== Release ==
Sol Divide was released on February 24, 2005 for the PlayStation 2. It was released for Nintendo Switch on March 22, 2018.

== Reception ==
Reception

Review scores
Publication	Score
Famitsu	29/40 (PS)
GameSpot	7.5/10
Nintendo Life	7/10
Video Games	50% (SAT)
Super GamePower	4.3/5
Joypad	2/10
Acao Games	7.5/10
Sega Saturn Magazine	8/10 (SAT)

Sol Divide received mixed to positive reception from critics since its release.
