= Chihaya (clothing) =

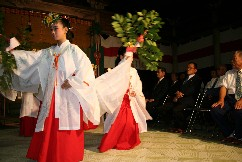
An example of Chihaya clothing

Chihaya (襅; ちはや) refers to certain articles of clothing worn in Japanese culture.

These may include:

1. A cloth or cord used to tie back the sleeves of a robe, primarily used by women to get the sleeves out of the way for work ranging from important shrine ceremonies to humble kitchen work.
2. A kind of ceremonial overcoat with a long white hem worn by the sweeper or branch-holder in certain Shintō ceremonies.
3. A kind of sleeveless vest or waistcoat used in kabuki or 人形浄瑠璃 (ningyō jōruri; "puppet theater").

One source describes the chihaya as "a traditional formal upper-garment with very large sleeves, a long strip falling along the back and tying-strings over the chest", and states that this garment was "used by nobles in the Heian court, where it was called 'a hunting garment' (kariginu)".
