= Strikers 1945 II =

1997 video game

- Arcade flyer
- Developers: Psikyo; Kuusou Kagaku (Sega Saturn/PS); WindySoft (iOS/Android)
- Publishers: Psikyo; Success (PlayStation, JP [re-release as part of SuperLite 1500 Series]); Agetec (PlayStation, NA); Midas Games (PlayStation, EU); GungHo Online Entertainment (PlayStation Network); Mobirix & APX Soft (iOS/Android); S&C Entertainment (Google Play)
- Directors: Naozumi Yorichika; Hideyuki Oda
- Producer: Shinsuke Nakamura
- Designers: Naozumi Yorichika; Hideyuki Oda; Norikazu Takemori; Emi Taniguchi; Yoko Tsukagoshi; Kunio Asahara; Keizo Fujita; Hideto Kamioka (Arcade); Daisuke Nobori (PS/Sega Saturn)
- Programmers: Shiori Saito; Keisuke Takagi; Kenichi Fujita; Kunihiko Nogomi
- Artist: Yoshiyuki Takani
- Composer: Masaki Izutani
- Series: Strikers 1945
- Platforms: Arcade, Sega Saturn, PlayStation, PlayStation Network, iOS, Android, Nintendo Switch, Microsoft Windows, PlayStation 4, Xbox One
- Release: 1997: JP: October 22, 1998 (Sega Saturn, PlayStation); September 9, 2000 (PlayStation, re-release); NA: March 27, 2001; EU: 2003; 2011 (PlayStation Network); 2014 (iOS, Android): WW: January 25, 2018 (Switch); WW: May 29, 2020 (Windows); WW: July 13, 2022 (PS4 & XONE)
- Genre: Scrolling shooter
- Modes: Up to 2 players, simultaneously
- Arcade system: Psikyo SH2

Strikers 1945 II (ストライカーズ1945II) is a vertically-scrolling shoot 'em up game developed and originally published by Psikyo in 1997 for the arcades as a follow-up to Strikers 1945. This game was also ported by Kuusou Kagaku to the PlayStation and Sega Saturn for Psikyo and re-released by Success in 2000. Agetec released Strikers 1945 II for the PlayStation in North America under the title Strikers 1945 in 2001, and Midas Games released it in Europe as a budget title in 2003. The game was also included in Psikyo Shooting Collection Vol. 1: Strikers 1945 I&II by Taito for PlayStation 2, later was released as a downloadable title for PlayStation Network by GungHo Online Entertainment, and finally for Android and iOS by Mobirix (as STRIKERS 1945-2). Also, after S&C Entertainment developed another version, they released it on Google Play, with the plane fire button removed, making it autofire and only tap the bomb and charge icons.

== Gameplay ==
Arcade version screenshot, showing a P-38 Lightning engaging in battle with Huge Flying Boat Syumi Type-0.

As in Strikers 1945, the player chooses one of six World War II-era fighter planes, then uses machine guns and bombs to fight through eight stages (the first four stages being in random order and the latter four stages in linear fashion). Once the game is beaten, a report showing how well the player did is displayed, and the game 'loops' with the difficulty much higher. Each game begins with three lives, and an extend is earned at 600,000 (or 800,000). When all lives are lost, the option to continue is given but the score is reset.

In the console versions, from the fifth stage onwards, in addition to the score being reset, the player must also replay the stage where they lost all their lives from the beginning.

== Plot ==
Continuing where the last game ended, the forces of C.A.N.Y. have been demolished by the Strikers, but a faction known as the F.G.R. now has the C.A.N.Y. technology and plans to initiate global warfare with massive mecha technology. Once again, the Strikers are called into action to save the world.

== Reception ==
In Japan, Game Machine listed Strikers 1945 II on their November 15, 1997 issue as being the sixth most-successful arcade game of the month.

Strikers 1945 II was mostly well received. Three reviewers from the Japanese Sega Saturn Magazine gave the version for this system the scores of 9-8-8/10, while French magazine Consoles + rated both the Saturn and PlayStation ports an 88%. Similarly, the original arcade version received a score of 88% from French magazine Player One.

On the other hand, Miguel Lopez from GameSpot gave the PlayStation release only a 5.8/10, recommending it just for the fans of the genre. IGN's David Smith voiced a similar opinion, but nevertheless gave it a "good" score of 7.3/10.

Chester Barber reviewed the PlayStation version of the game for Next Generation, rating it two stars out of five, and stated that "Strikers is a decent shooter of a type that's all but dead. Unfortunately, it hasn't aged well over the years, though if you're into old games, this would be worth a rental".
