= PlayStation Studios =

Division of Sony Interactive Entertainment

- Logo used since 2020
- Formerly: SCE Worldwide Studios (2005–2016); SIE Worldwide Studios (2016–2020)
- Type: Division
- Industry: Video games
- Founded: September 1, 2005; 21 years ago
- Headquarters: San Mateo, California; London, England; Tokyo, Japan
- Key people: Hermen Hulst (head of PlayStation Studios); Scott Rohde (head of internal production); John Rostron (head of external production)
- Number of employees: ≈4,000 (2022)
- Parent: Sony Interactive Entertainment
- Subsidiaries: See § Studios
- Website: playstation.com/en-us/corporate/playstation-studios/

PlayStation Studios (formerly SCE Worldwide Studios and SIE Worldwide Studios) is a division of Sony Interactive Entertainment (SIE) that oversees the video game development at the studios owned by SIE. The division was established as SCE Worldwide Studios in September 2005 and rebranded as PlayStation Studios in 2020 to include the PlayStation brand.

== History ==
On September 14, 2005, Sony Computer Entertainment (SCE, now known as Sony Interactive Entertainment), the video game arm of Sony, announced the formation of SCE Worldwide Studios earlier that month, combining all studios SCE owned at the time. Phil Harrison was appointed as the division's president; he resigned in February 2008. Kazuo Hirai became acting president, succeeded by Shuhei Yoshida in May 2008. When Yoshida moved to lead the indie game development of SIE, Hermen Hulst, previously of SIE's Guerrilla Games studio, became the president of SIE Worldwide Studios in November 2019. The studios productions are generally supported by the Visual Arts Services Group, founded in 2007 in San Diego.

SIE announced the rebranding of the division to PlayStation Studios in May 2020 as part of the introduction of the PlayStation 5, which was released later that year. PlayStation Studios serves as the publishing brand for Sony's first-party development studios, as well as for games developed by studios brought in by Sony in work-for-hire situations.

In 2022, Sony stated half of its first-party PlayStation Studios games will be on personal computers (PC) and mobile by 2025. In August 2022, SIE announced the formation of the PlayStation Studios Mobile Division, alongside the acquisition of the company's first mobile development team, Savage Game Studios, later renamed Neon Koi. In February 2024, Sony announced it would eliminate 900 jobs, or 8% of SIE and PlayStation Studios employees. These cuts included the closure of London Studio.

In July 2024, Sony and Bungie announced that as part of restructuring at Bungie, one of the studio's incubation projects would be spun out, with the team behind the game forming a new studio within PlayStation Studios, later on in May 2025 it being revealed as teamLFG. In October 2024, Sony announced the closure of Neon Koi and Firewalk Studios. In March 2025, Sony formed Dark Outlaw Games, a new studio under PlayStation Studios, led by Jason Blundell. In an August 2025 financial briefing, Sony CFO Lin Tao stated that SIE planned to fully integrate and oversee Bungie as a developer within the core PlayStation Studios lineup, after initially allowing them to function as an independent subsidiary since their acquisition in 2022. On February 19, 2026, Sony announced that they will shut down Bluepoint Games. On March 24th, 2026, it was reported by Jason Schreier that Dark Outlaw Games were closing down. On November 10th, 2026, Schreier reported that Haven Studios' Fairgame$ had been canceled, with Haven transitioning into a support studio. No jobs have been cut at Haven Studios over the cancellation.

== Studios ==
Name	Location/s	Founded	Acquired	Notable releases
Bend Studio	Bend, Oregon	1993	2000	Syphon Filter, Resistance: Retribution, Uncharted: Golden Abyss, Days Gone
Firesprite	Liverpool	2012	2021	Run Sackboy! Run!, Horizon Call of the Mountain, Until Dawn 2
Guerrilla Games	Amsterdam	2000	2005	Killzone, Horizon
Haven Studios	Montreal	2021	2022	Support for first-party titles
Housemarque	Helsinki	1995	2021	Super Stardust HD, Dead Nation, Resogun, Alienation, Matterfall, Returnal, Saros
Insomniac Games	Burbank, California	1994	2019	Spyro (1998-2000), Ratchet & Clank, Resistance, Marvel's Spider-Man, Marvel's Wolverine
Insomniac Games	Durham, North Carolina	1994	2019	Spyro (1998-2000), Ratchet & Clank, Resistance, Marvel's Spider-Man, Marvel's Wolverine
Malaysia Studio	Kuala Lumpur	2020	—	Support for first-party titles, such as The Last of Us Part I and MLB The Show 22
Media Molecule	Guildford	2006	2010	LittleBigPlanet, Tearaway, Dreams
Naughty Dog	Santa Monica, California	1984	2001	Crash Bandicoot (1996-1999), Jak and Daxter, Uncharted, The Last of Us, Intergalactic: The Heretic Prophet
Nixxes Software	Utrecht	1999	2021	Windows ports and support work for various first-party PlayStation titles; Xbox Series X/S port of Helldivers 2
Polyphony Digital	Tokyo	1998	—	Gran Turismo, Motor Toon Grand Prix, Omega Boost, Tourist Trophy
San Diego Studio	San Diego	2001	—	The Mark of Kri, NBA, MLB: The Show
San Mateo Studio	San Mateo, California	1998	—	Support studio for second-party developers
Santa Monica Studio	Los Angeles	1999	—	Kinetica, God of War
Sucker Punch Productions	Bellevue, Washington	1997	2011	Sly Cooper, Infamous, Ghost of Tsushima, Ghost of Yōtei
Team Asobi	Tokyo	2021 (Note: Team Asobi was first established in 2012 as an internal team of Japan Studio, and was spun off as its own independent studio in 2021.)	—	The Playroom, Astro Bot
teamLFG	Bellevue, Washington	2025	—	—
Valkyrie Entertainment	Seattle, Washington	2002	2021	Support studio for various franchises such as Infamous, God of War, and Twisted Metal
XDev	Liverpool	2000	—	Works with external developers across Europe, on projects such as Until Dawn, Detroit: Become Human, and Kena: Scars of Kosmora
XDev	Tokyo	2020	—	Works with external developers across Japan and South Korea, on projects such as Rise of the Ronin, Stellar Blade, Death Stranding 2: On the Beach and Marvel Tōkon: Fighting Souls

=== Former ===
Name	Location	Founded	Acquired	Divested	Fate	Notable releases
Bigbig Studios	Leamington Spa	2001	2007	2012	Closed	Pursuit Force, MotorStorm: Arctic Edge, Little Deviants
Bluepoint Games	Austin, Texas	2006	2021	2026	Closed	Blast Factor, Shadow of the Colossus (PS4), Demon's Souls (PS5)
Dark Outlaw Games	Los Angeles	2025	—	2026	Closed	Studio led by Call of Duty veteran Jason Blundell
Evolution Studios	Runcorn	1999	2007	2016	Closed	WRC (2001-2005), MotorStorm, Driveclub
Firewalk Studios	Bellevue, Washington	2018	2023	2024	Closed	Concord
Guerrilla Cambridge	Cambridge	1997	—	2017	Closed	MediEvil, Primal, LittleBigPlanet (PSP), TV Superstars, Killzone: Mercenary, RIGS: Mechanized Combat League
Incognito Entertainment	Salt Lake City	1999	2002	2009	Closed	Twisted Metal (2001-2005), War of the Monsters, Downhill Domination, Calling All Cars!, Warhawk
Japan Studio	Tokyo	2005	—	2021	Reorganized within SIE, primarily to Team Asobi	Ape Escape, The Legend of Dragoon, Ico, Siren, Shadow of the Colossus, Rogue Galaxy, LocoRoco, Patapon, Gravity Rush, Tokyo Jungle, Puppeteer, Knack, Astro Bot (2013-2020), The Last Guardian
London Studio	London	2002	—	2024	Closed	This Is Football (2002-2006), EyeToy games, SingStar, The Getaway: Black Monday, Gangs of London, PlayStation Home, Wonderbook, PlayStation VR Worlds, Blood & Truth, Erica
Manchester Studio	Manchester	2015	—	2020	Closed	CSAR: Combat (Cancelled), Search, and Rescue (Cancelled)
Neon Koi	Berlin	2020	2022	2024	Closed	Mobile Division
Neon Koi	Helsinki	2020	2022	2024	Closed	Mobile Division
Pixelopus	San Mateo, California	2014	—	2023	Closed	Entwined, Concrete Genie
Studio Liverpool	Liverpool	1984	1993	2012	Closed	Formula One, Wipeout (1995-2012)
Zipper Interactive	Redmond, Washington	1995	2006	2012	Closed	SOCOM U.S. Navy SEALs, MAG, Unit 13

== See also ==
- Audiokinetic
- Bungie
- PlayStation Productions
- List of Sony Interactive Entertainment video games
