= Oskan =

Oskan may refer to:

- Öskən, Azerbaijan
- Shelayna Oskan-Clarke (born 1990), British athlete
- a character from The Icemark Chronicles

== See also ==
- Oscan, a language of ancient Italy
- Oksen (disambiguation)
- Voskan, Armenian male given name
