= Wingly =

Wingly may refer to:

- Wingly (company), running a flightsharing website
- Wingly, a type of fictional character in The Legend of Dragoon
