= Qəribli =

Qəribli or Garibli or Garibly or Gyaribli may refer to:

- Qəribli, Agdash, Azerbaijan
- Qəribli, Tovuz, Azerbaijan
