= Voska =

Voska is a surname. Notable people with the surname include:

- Emanuel Viktor Voska (1875–1960), American intelligence officer
- Matt Voska, American pilot and founder of Flytenow
- Václav Voska (1918–1982), Czech actor

== See also ==
- Voskan
- FK Voska Sport, a football club from North Macedonia
