= Hətəmlər =

Hətəmlər or Khatamla or Khatamlar or Khatamalar may refer to:

- Hətəmlər, Lachin, Azerbaijan
- Hətəmlər, Tovuz, Azerbaijan
