= Black Monster =

Black Monster may refer to:

- Name of a character from the 1999 video game The Legend of Dragoon
- Nickname of the centerfield wall at Cinergy Field during 2001 and 2002, erected as a temporary batter's eye during construction of an adjacent stadium
- One of the branding names of the Monster energy drink
