= MotorStorm =

Video game series

- Genre: Racing
- Developers: Evolution Studios (2006–2012); Bigbig Studios (2009); Virtuos (2009)
- Publisher: Sony Computer Entertainment
- Platforms: PlayStation 3; PlayStation Portable; PlayStation 2; PlayStation Vita
- First release: MotorStorm; 14 December 2006
- Latest release: MotorStorm: RC; 22 February 2012

MotorStorm was a racing video game series created by Evolution Studios and published by Sony Computer Entertainment, with some instalments co-developed by BigBig Studios and Virtuos.

MotorStorm are off-road racing games featuring different types of vehicles with their own strengths and weaknesses and tracks with different terrains which may either hinder the vehicles' handling or improve it. The central premise of the series was a gathering of off-road racing enthusiasts for an event entitled the "MotorStorm Festival". Participants in the MotorStorm Festival are not limited to their vehicle choice for any event and cut-throat racing is encouraged. Races allow for any combination of vehicles to be used together in a single event.

The final installment in the series was MotorStorm: RC in 2012. Sony closed Evolution Studios on 22 March 2016 and retained ownership of the MotorStorm intellectual property. In April 2016, Codemasters hired most of the Evolution staff as an additional development team.

== Games ==
Aggregate review scores As of 4 July 2014.
Game	Metacritic
MotorStorm	(PS3) 84
MotorStorm: Pacific Rift	(PS3) 82
MotorStorm: Arctic Edge	(PSP) 79 (PS2) 72
MotorStorm: Apocalypse	(PS3) 77
MotorStorm: RC	(Vita) 78

=== MotorStorm (2006) ===
The first game was released in December 2006 in Japan, 6 March 2007 in North America and in Europe on 23 March 2007. The first MotorStorm game includes various classes of vehicles, ranging from Bikes to Big Rigs, each with their own abilities and weaknesses. While Bikes and ATVs are some of the faster vehicles in the game, alongside Rally Cars, they are very weak and are prone to being punched out by other riders or wrecked by bigger vehicles. Buggies are four-wheelers that use their lightweight as an advantage when it comes to speed, handling and ability to cross most terrain. Rally Cars are the fastest vehicles in a straight line but suffer from rough terrain and loose surfaces, and thus are easily slowed or damaged by any other heavy vehicles. Racing Trucks, slightly larger than Rally Cars, are noted for their well-rounded performance and can deal with most situations. Mud Pluggers are medium-heavy vehicles, and can tackle any terrain they find, but do not excel when it comes to speed. Big Rigs are the heaviest vehicles in the game. While they favour most terrain, particularly mud, their acceleration is very slow, and this can be a problem when racing against faster vehicles. As a rule of thumb, the larger a vehicle is, the greater the ability that it will have in traversing looser, muddier surfaces.

There are 8 tracks that can be raced on in the game's setting of Monument Valley, from sand dunes to rocky canyons, with four additional tracks that can be purchased through the PlayStation Store, totalling up to 12 tracks. For example, "Mudpool" consists of mud-filled canyons, giving lighter vehicles a massive disadvantage, thus forcing them to use ramps and routes which keep to higher ground, while Mud Pluggers and Big Rigs gain an advantage through the muddy terrain. "Dust Devil" consists of sandy desert and high-speed straights, which are suited for any vehicle, though many hazards are present, such as stacks of burnt-out vehicles and rocky outcrops.

Boost plays a large part in MotorStorm, and is used to either catch up to opponents or pull away from them. Players must keep an eye on their boost meter, which shows how hot their vehicle's engine is. The longer the boost is held on, the hotter the engine becomes. If the boost is held when the engine reaches its critical temperature, it will explode. Since explosions resulting from the boost typically rocket the player's vehicle forward, they can be used to edge out another racer across the finish line. This can be very useful when behind, although this does not work all of the time if the opponent gains the upper hand.

Since then, MotorStorm has achieved global sales of over 3 million copies.

=== MotorStorm: Pacific Rift (2008) ===
The second game was released on 28 October 2008 in North America and 7 November 2008 in Europe. The game has sold over one million copies as of 9 December 2008. The game takes place in a lush, volcanic island, much different from the first game's Monument Valley.

The original seven vehicle classes return, including, for the first time, Monster Trucks. The Monster Truck can handle any terrain, just like the Mud Pluggers. Not only surprisingly fast, it is also considerably deadly, since it can run over and crush other vehicles, including other Monster Trucks and Big Rigs. It is, however, quite vulnerable in crashes, and due to a high centre of gravity they have a tendency to roll over.

New features which affect the player's boost temperature are introduced in Pacific Rift; for example, driving through water will cool boost, whereas driving through fire or near lava will heat it, risking a boost explosion. Another new feature in the series is the ability to manually ram other vehicles and throw punches at Bike/ATV-riding opponents. "Speed" events are also introduced, where players must pass through set checkpoints before the time runs out. Players can also select drivers of different gender and racing-suit design.

Photo Mode can be entered from the pause menu while racing, and images can be exported to the PlayStation 3's HDD. Yet another new addition is the ability to play the user's music via the console's XrossMediaBar.

=== MotorStorm: Arctic Edge (2009) ===
The third game was developed by Bigbig Studios for PlayStation 2 and PlayStation Portable. It was released in September 2009. To date, it is the only MotorStorm title not to appear on the PlayStation 3.

The "cooldown" system from Pacific Rift (driving through water or deep snow in Arctic Edge to speed up the rate of boost cooling) remains. A new feature of Arctic Edge is the ability to outfit the vehicles with new body kits, liveries, and exhaust systems (though none of the enhancements affect the performance of the vehicle). Sponsor decals can also be applied to the vehicle.

A new hazard that racers need to be aware of is avalanches, which can be triggered by a vehicle's explosion or blowing the horn. A wave of snow will rush down the hillside in the avalanche areas and sweep away any vehicle trapped under it, regardless of the vehicles' strength rating. Ice bridges present another new obstacle unique to Arctic Edge. While small vehicles can get through ice bridges, heavier vehicles can cause it to break and disintegrate, making the shortcut unusable but also preventing other competitors from using it to gain an advantage.

=== MotorStorm: Apocalypse (2011) ===
The fourth game was released on 16 March 2011 in Europe and on 3 May in North America, due to a delay following the 2011 Japan earthquake. In June 2011, the game's release in Japan was cancelled for unknown reasons. It is the third game of the series to appear on the PlayStation 3. Apocalypse is the first MotorStorm game set in an urban environment as opposed to natural settings, taking place in a decaying city suffering the aftermath of a natural disaster, known as The City. Competitors are challenged to race through these ruins while avoiding collapsed buildings, explosions, and tremors that will actively and visually redefine the routes mid-race. The opponents, along with the player, will need to be wary of two warring factions as bystanders will present a hazard for the first time in the series. The civilian "Crazies" are seen wandering around the city, scavenging items and starting fights against each other, even throwing rocks or molotov cocktails. DuskLite, a private military contractor, will attempt to control the "Crazies" and stop the races of the Festival. The game also adds five new vehicle classes alongside the original vehicles: the Superbikes, Supercars, Superminis, Muscle Cars and Choppers.

Like MotorStorm: Arctic Edge, players can customize their vehicles' appearance with a wide array of parts, sponsor stickers, vinyl, etc. Some of the parts must be unlocked by progressing through certain tasks during online play, such as wrecking other players, drifting, and gaining air-time over jumps. Players can also equip perks for online races, for the first time in the series.

The game's main Festival mode contains a story about three racers competing in the two-day Festival, namely "The Rookie", Mash, "The Pro", Tyler, and "The Veteran", Big Dog. Each of the characters represents a difficulty level, from Mash's races being the easiest to Big Dog's being the most difficult.

=== MotorStorm: RC (2012) ===
The fifth game was released for PlayStation Vita and PlayStation 3 on 22 February 2012 in Europe, 6 March 2012 in North America, and 29 March 2012 in Japan.

The game features a total of 16 unique tracks from the previous game's areas, as well as an additional 10 tracks to download. There are 8 vehicle classes that take the form of remote-controlled vehicles. The game also features online ghost time multiplayer and single player for both versions.
