= MotorStorm: RC =

2012 video game

- Developer: Evolution Studios
- Publisher: Sony Computer Entertainment
- Series: MotorStorm
- Platforms: PlayStation 3, PlayStation Vita
- Release: PAL: 22 February 2012; NA: 6 March 2012; JP: 29 March 2012
- Genre: Racing
- Modes: Single-player, multiplayer

MotorStorm: RC is a 2012 racing video game developed by Evolution Studios and published by Sony Computer Entertainment for the PlayStation 3 and PlayStation Vita. It is the fifth and most recent game in the MotorStorm series and the first to be released for the PlayStation Vita.

The game features 8 styles of vehicles, 4 returning areas from previous MotorStorm games, and has 16 tracks built out of them. The Pro-Am Expansion and the Carnival Expansion DLC, both released in 2012, add new tracks and vehicles to the game. The game features split screen multiplayer, cross-saving and a single purchase for both versions of the game.

== Reception ==
Reception

Aggregate score
Aggregator	Score	
Aggregator	PS Vita	PS3
Metacritic	78/100	83/100

Review scores
Publication	Score	
Publication	PS Vita	PS3
4Players	80%	82%
Edge	7/10	N/A
Eurogamer	8/10	N/A
GamesMaster	86%	N/A
Hyper	9/10	N/A
IGN	8.5/10	8.5/10
Jeuxvideo.com	13/20	14/20
Pocket Gamer	4/5	N/A
PlayStation: The Official Magazine	5/10	N/A
Push Square	9/10	N/A
VideoGamer.com	9/10	N/A
The Digital Fix	9/10	N/A
Digital Spy	4/5	N/A

MotorStorm: RC received "favourable" reviews on both platforms according to the review aggregation website Metacritic.

Eurogamer praised the use of instantaneous restarts, minimal loading times, fast pacing, and a dubstep soundtrack in order to create an engaging gameplay loop. IGN called the title "refreshingly simple" while lauding its sharp handling model, live leaderboards, and amount of content. Pocket Gamer said that MotorStorm: RC was "...an extremely forward-thinking game in terms of simplicity of play, online connectivity, and pricing. Push Square stated that the title was "utterly essential" and said that it served as "...a successful test bed for one of the PlayStation Vita's most promising features", while saying that the social functions "...[brought] longevity to the package despite its meager price point." VideoGamer.com praised the addictive gameplay and deep handling model but found the game to be visually a bit rough on the Vita.

The Digital Fix gave the Vita version nine out of ten, calling it "a fantastic example of a racing game, a handheld game and a fine example of how to use multiplayer without just having classic multiplayer." Digital Spy gave it four stars out of five, saying, "Who would have thought that a budget digital title would actually outshine some of the big guns of the PS Vita launch lineup? It's the perfect amalgamation of old and new that will please MotorStorm fans and the nostalgia brigade alike." Metro gave it eight out of ten, calling it "The most enjoyable MotorStorm game by far and arguably the best game on the PS Vita - or at the very least the best value for money."

During the Academy of Interactive Arts & Sciences' 16th Annual D.I.C.E. Awards, the game was nominated for the "Racing Game of the Year" award, which went to Need for Speed: Most Wanted.
