= Oksen =

Oksen may refer to:

- Oksen Mirzoyan, Soviet weightlifter
- Oksen Ourfalian, Lebanese footballer
- Öskən, Azerbaijan
- Oksyon (Oksen), a diminutive of the Russian male first name Avksenty
