= Dəlləkli, Tovuz =

Dəlləkli
- Location within Azerbaijan
- Coordinates: 40°42′N 45°38′E
- Country: Azerbaijan
- Rayon: Tovuz
- Municipality: Qəribli
- Time zone: UTC+4 (AZT)
  - Summer (DST): UTC+5 (AZT)

Dəlləkli (also, Dellekli and Dellyakli) is a village in the Tovuz Rayon of Azerbaijan. The village forms part of the municipality of Qəribli.
