= Bala Şamlıq =

- Location within Azerbaijan
- Coordinates: 40°42′N 45°37′E
- Country: Azerbaijan
- Rayon: Tovuz
- Municipality: Qəribli
- Time zone: UTC+4 (AZT)
  - Summer (DST): UTC+5 (AZT)

Bala Şamlıq is a village in the municipality of Qəribli in the Tovuz Rayon of Azerbaijan.
