= Pursuit Force: Extreme Justice =

2007 video game

- PAL game cover
- Developer: Bigbig Studios
- Publisher: Sony Computer Entertainment
- Composers: Richard Jacques; Jeff Tymoschuk
- Platform: PlayStation Portable
- Release: EU: 7 December 2007; AU: 13 December 2007; NA: 29 January 2008
- Genres: Vehicular combat, third-person shooter
- Modes: Single-player, multiplayer

Pursuit Force: Extreme Justice is a 2007 vehicular combat and third-person shooter video game developed by Bigbig Studios and published by Sony Computer Entertainment for the PlayStation Portable. The sequel to Pursuit Force, it was released in PAL regions in December 2007 and in North America in January 2008. A PlayStation 2 version was announced but never released. The game received mixed reviews from critics. In August 2023, Pursuit Force: Extreme Justice was released for PlayStation 4 and PlayStation 5 as part of the Classics Catalogue.

== Gameplay ==
The player controls the Commander of a special section of the police known as the Pursuit Force, to combat the city's gangs. Gameplay is action-packed, fast-paced and "arcadey", played from a third-person perspective. The player pursues adversaries in cars, motorbikes, helicopters and boats, usually engaging in gun combat with them. The intensity of the fast sections are broken up with on-foot and rail-shooting sequences. As in the original Pursuit Force game, in many driving sections, the player can jump from their vehicle onto enemy vehicles, have a firefight with the occupants, and take over the vehicle. Missions typically last around ten minutes and are split into distinctly different gameplay segments; e.g. a mission could involve a driving protect section, followed by a helicopter turret sequence, and end with an on-foot combat area.

Enemies are from five distinctive gangs across a vast fictional state (Capital State, featuring Capital City) in North America. Other members of the Pursuit Force often join the player as allies (controlled by the computer AI). A number of boss fights appear throughout the game, typically in control of vast signature vehicles (for example a huge hovercraft for the Raiders). The game features a "Justice" meter which fills as the player damages enemies and performs other feats. The Justice meter can be used for several things depending on whether it is partially filled or completely filled. When partially full, the player can partially regain vehicle and character health. When the Justice meter is full, the player can increase the damage and use a special attack, depending on the context. The player character's statistics can also be upgraded in a limited fashion as the player progresses through the game. Other features include Ad hoc multiplayer (with driving and on-foot modes), a challenge mode, and a Pursuit Force shop, where the player can buy items such as game art, videos and cheats.

The unlockable cheats are split in two categories: Cheats and Super Cheats. They can be bought from the in-game shop using stars won from the Bounty mode, and modify the difficulty of the game when active. However, if more than one cheat is active, the player can't progress in the game until all extra cheats are disabled. There are a total of 9 Cheats and 8 Super Cheats.

Extreme Justice was also meant to support cross-platform save games, allowing players to transfer progress between the PSP and PS2 versions. However, as the PS2 version was never released, this option remains non-functional.

== Plot ==
The player assumes the role of the Pursuit Force Commander, assigned with the task of taking down the biggest gangs at large in Capital State: the Raiders, professional pirates from the Deep South; the Syndicate, British bank robbers; and returning from the original Pursuit Force game, the Warlords and the Convicts. The objective is to eliminate the 'boss' of each gang, using any means necessary.

The game takes place two years after the events of the original game. The wedding of the Commander and his teammate Sarah Hunter is crashed by the Convicts, who have escaped from prison once again to seek revenge on the Pursuit Force. Shortly afterwards, a police chase commences, leading to a fight between the Commander and Billy Wilde atop a stolen fire truck.

Once Billy Wilde is defeated, the Pursuit Force is about to apprehend him. Suddenly, a new police task force called the Viper Squad shows up to handle the situation themselves. Realizing they are unable to do much with the Viper Squad, the Pursuit Force now returns to handling cases that came with the arrival of two new gangs: the Raiders and the Syndicate. During a fight against the Raiders and the Warlords, Yuri "The Fury" Andreov, the Warlords' lieutenant, kills Sarah, leaving the Commander in much grief.

The Pursuit Force goes back to piecing together pieces of the puzzle as they rescue nuclear physicist Dr. Pertwee to find out why all the gangs are cooperating. During their ambush on the Syndicate, the Pursuit Force finds out the Syndicate lieutenant is in fact an MI5 spy named Lucy, adding more to the complication of affairs as she is attempting to find who is carrying the majority of the nuclear weapons. It seems that the Raiders, the Convicts, and the Syndicate are merely delivering the nuclear cargo, as it is the Warlords who intend to launch nukes at Capital City. The leaders of the weaker gangs are summarily defeated, and just as it looks like most of the cases are closed, a mole plants a bomb in the Pursuit Force headquarters, and the resulting explosion injures the Chief.

As the Pursuit Force tries to figure out who is the mole among them, it appears all fingers are pointed at the recruits: Ashley, Preach and Gage. Meanwhile, a mysterious new masked gang begins terrorizing the city. To further escalate the problem, it is only after battling the Warlord General that Viper Squad Commander Decker is revealed to be the one behind the entire plot. While the Warlords have gone rogue already, Decker plans to turn Capital City into a police state and, to be able to do so, he has his Viper Squad do the dirty job by starting a campaign of terror on the innocent civilians of the city. In other words, the masked gang turns out to be the members of the Viper Squad.

The President of the United States is arriving at Capital City for a visit, prompting the Viper Squad to ambush him. During the Pursuit Force's escort mission for the President, Ashley is discovered as the Viper mole of the Pursuit Force. A battle in a Viper helicopter leads to the death of the mole, but Preach is still questionably missing from the team. However, worse fears are put aside as it is revealed that Preach has been fighting the Viper Squad with the cops until the team reunites. After a fight at the hospital, a demoralized Viper Squad withdraws in their mobile headquarters in an attempt to flee the city, and a final battle against Decker along the streets puts an end to the Viper Squad once and for all.

After the battle, a ceremony in honor of the Pursuit Force for their heroic deeds in stopping the Viper Squad is held, but the Chief and the Commander are nowhere to be found. They are shown paying their last respects to Sarah at her grave. The Commander quits the Pursuit Force, leaving his badge and gun behind, but the Chief assures him that he will be back sometime in the future.

== Development ==
One of the biggest criticism of the previous instalment was the difficulty level, with many players complaining that Pursuit Force was too hard to beat. The developers took note of the feedback and decided to build Extreme Justice from the ground up. As a result, the sequel provides an easier difficulty than its predecessor while still bringing some decent challenges.

== Reception ==
Reception

Aggregate score
Aggregator	Score
Metacritic	73/100

Review scores
Publication	Score
Edge	6/10
Electronic Gaming Monthly	6/10
Eurogamer	7/10
Game Informer	7.25/10
GameDaily	8/10
GameRevolution	B−
GameSpot	7.5/10
GameSpy	3.5/5
GameTrailers	8/10
GameZone	7.5/10
Hardcore Gamer	3.5/5
IGN	(US) 8/10 (UK) 7.4/10
Pocket Gamer	3.5/5
PlayStation: The Official Magazine	4.5/5

Pursuit Force: Extreme Justice received "mixed or average" reviews from critics, according to review aggregator website Metacritic. GamePro said, "Extreme Justice hardly stands out from the rest of the pack but it more or less hits its intended mark. It's not going to blow you away but it is fun to keep you engaged for a few hours. If you're looking for some mindless action then check this game out." (Note: GamePro gave the game 3.25/5 for graphics, 3/5 for sound, and two 3.5/5 scores for control and fun factor.)
