= Bigbig Studios =

British video game developer

- Type: Subsidiary
- Industry: Video games
- Founded: 2001; 25 years ago
- Defunct: 2012; 14 years ago
- Fate: Dissolved
- Successor: Evolution Studios
- Headquarters: Leamington Spa, Warwickshire, England
- Parent: SCE Worldwide Studios (2007–2012)

Bigbig Studios was a British video game developer based in Leamington Spa, England. It was founded in 2001 by a core team of four former Codemasters employees. The company was set up with the help of parent company Evolution Studios.

Bigbig Studios and Evolution Studios were both acquired by Sony Computer Entertainment in September 2007, and Bigbig Studios was assigned to work exclusively for the portable PlayStation products. They developed the Pursuit Force games for the PlayStation Portable, MotorStorm: Arctic Edge for the PlayStation Portable and PlayStation 2, and Little Deviants for the PlayStation Vita.

On 10 January 2012, Sony confirmed that it would close Bigbig Studios.

== Games developed ==
Game title	Year released	Platform(s)
Pursuit Force	2005	PlayStation Portable
Pursuit Force: Extreme Justice	2007	PlayStation Portable
MotorStorm: Arctic Edge	2009	PlayStation Portable & PlayStation 2
Little Deviants	2012	PlayStation Vita
