= Flight sharing =

Flight sharing is the sharing of the direct operating costs of non-commercial general aviation aircraft flights between a licensed pilot and their passengers (in contrast to the outright commercial operation of flights for hire, such as fractional ownership of aircraft or air charter).

== Websites ==
With the rise of the Internet, numerous websites have appeared to coordinate the meeting of private pilots with willing passengers for particular flights.

== Legal issues ==
=== United States ===
The sharing of flight operational costs between a pilot and their passengers is permitted on a non-commercial certificate basis in the United States, under the terms of the Federal Aviation Regulations (FARs) prescribed by the Federal Aviation Administration (FAA). That is to say that in certain situations, flight costs may be shared and not cause the flight to be classified as commercial regulated carrier activity.

However, the FARs specify several conditions for this to be true. Per FAR 61.113(c), the allowed compensation for such a flight is limited to the direct actual costs, and not more:

(c) A private pilot may not pay less than the pro rata share of the operating expenses of a flight with passengers, provided the expenses involve only fuel, oil, airport expenditures, or rental fees.

The regulations also state that the pilot and passengers must share a "common purpose" in the flight, e.g. they are conducting the flight for a commonly shared external purpose (other than the flight itself). Also, the pilot must not be "holding out" (i.e. advertising) to the general public the offer to transport passengers, but only a limited and well-defined audience (for example, family/friends, members of a private flying club, or users of an airport facility). The intention of the FAA regulations is that such flight cost sharing does not gradually encompass broad commercial activity where pilots and passengers associate together solely for the conducting of the flight -- this would fall within commercial flight regulations.

In Summer 2014, the FAA ruled that the flight offerings of two flight-sharing platforms, Flytenow and AirPooler, constituted activity that was regulated under commercial carrier terms, based on the broad audience reached and "holding out" of offers to transport passengers.

Flytenow appealed to the US Court of Appeals, but on December 18, 2015, the court "denied [Flytenow's] request to overturn the Federal Aviation Administration’s ban on Flytenow and other online flight-sharing websites." The court ruled that these flight-sharing services were "common carriers," in part, due to the fact that these services were offered to the general public. Flytenow further appealed to the US Supreme Court, but was unsuccessful, and subsequently ceased operations.

=== European Union ===
In the European Union, flight sharing is authorized for light aircraft by the article 6 § 4 bis a) of the law n° 965/2012 enacted on October, 5th 2012. Several flight sharing startups were created in Europe, and especially in France, including Wingly.

== See also ==
- Carpool
