= MotorStorm: Arctic Edge =

2009 video game

- European PlayStation 2 cover art
- Developer: Bigbig Studios (Note: Ported to PlayStation 2 by Virtuos.)
- Publisher: Sony Computer Entertainment
- Series: MotorStorm
- Platforms: PlayStation Portable; PlayStation 2
- Release: PlayStation Portable: AU: 17 September 2009; EU: 18 September 2009; NA: 29 September 2009; PlayStation 2: AU: 3 October 2009; EU: 9 October 2009; NA: 20 October 2009
- Genre: Racing
- Modes: Single-player, multiplayer

MotorStorm: Arctic Edge is a 2009 racing video game developed by Bigbig Studios and published by Sony Computer Entertainment for the PlayStation Portable. A port developed by Virtuos for the PlayStation 2 was released the same year. It is the third game in the MotorStorm series and the only one to not be released on the PlayStation 3.

== Gameplay ==
A still from the MotorStorm: Arctic Edge announcement trailer, showing a Wulff Bolter rally car, one of the playable vehicles in the game

The game once again moves away from the desert environments of the original title and the lush island environment of the sequel and relocates itself to the harsh Arctic climate of Alaska on the edge of the Arctic Circle. Gameplay is similar to that of previous titles in the series such as Nitrous Boosts, environmental hazards and destructible environments. Vehicles have the ability to cool down the boost by driving through deep snow or under waterfalls, the same technique used for driving through the water in MotorStorm: Pacific Rift. Unlike the previous titles in the series, the game only features a maximum of ten racers in each race.

New hazards include avalanches, which can be triggered by vehicle explosion or blowing the vehicle's horn, which causes a large amount of snow to rumble down the track and will strike away opponents, including the player, no matter the vehicles' strengths. Icy bridges can also be dangerous for heavy vehicles. While small vehicles can get over ice bridges, heavier vehicles can cause them to disintegrate and break, making the short-cut impossible to cross.

There are differences between PlayStation Portable and PlayStation 2 edition of the game in order to make use of each systems specific capabilities. The PSP version features a Photo Mode, custom soundtracks and online play which features 6-player online multiplayer. On the other hand, the PS2 version features a split-screen multiplayer mode like the one present in MotorStorm: Pacific Rift. The Time Attack game mode's online leaderboard feature is only available for the PSP version of the game due to the PS2 version's lack of online functionality, though the mode itself remains available for the PS2 version.

=== Game modes ===
As with the previous MotorStorm title, the core game mode of MotorStorm: Arctic Edge is the Festival, where the player participates in over 100 events spanning across 8 tiers. These events include various race series called "Invitational".

The other gameplay mode of the game is known as the Wreckreation Mode, which consists of various game modes, such as:

- Free Play, is the classic racing mode in most racing games where players select a race type, a track, and so on, followed by vehicle selection.
- Time-Attack, is where players are timed as to how long they take to navigate through the curves and turns one lap at the time. Once the lap time is set, the ghost of the best recorded time by the player will appear on the course, though the player can instead opt to race against the ghost representing the time set by the developers.

=== Vehicles ===
MotorStorm: Arctic Edge features a total of 24 vehicles from 8 vehicle classes, most of which are specially designed to suit the Arctic climate: Bike, ATV, Snow Machine, Buggy, Rally Car, Snowplugger, Snow Cat and Big Rig. Each vehicle is fully customisable, with a vast number of cosmetic modifications, such as liveries, spoilers, exhaust, and sponsor stickers.

=== Tracks ===
MotorStorm: Arctic Edge features a total of 12 tracks, alongside the reverse variants of each track. Some tracks also include numerous hazards within.

Icy bridges are seen during races in several tracks and pose as a hazard for drivers above and below alike. While small, lightweight vehicles can easily navigate through, larger and heavier vehicles can easily disintegrate the bridge upon crossing it, thus causing opponents behind to tumble down the track, and will either be wrecked or receive some damage and drive off, if one of the heavy vehicles drives through while the other one behind falls down as the bridge gives way. Another new hazard, known as the avalanche, can be triggered by blowing the vehicles' horns, or by explosions from vehicles. The avalanche will then strike away opponents caught along the way. The amount of snow also increases as racers drive up the mountain, which would cause the surface to become more slippery for vehicles.

== Development ==
MotorStorm: Arctic Edge for the PlayStation Portable and PlayStation 2 was confirmed by Sony Computer Entertainment and was not developed by Evolution Studios who had previously developed the past two titles but instead by Bigbig Studios. Prior to that rumours of a PlayStation Portable edition of the previously PlayStation 3 MotorStorm had been swirling due to a tip by a staff member of Sony Computer Entertainment Europe in November 2008.

== Reception ==
Reception

Aggregate score
Aggregator	Score	
Aggregator	PS2	PSP
Metacritic	72/100	79/100

Review scores
Publication	Score	
Publication	PS2	PSP
1Up.com	N/A	B−
Edge	N/A	7/10
Eurogamer	N/A	7/10
Famitsu	N/A	29/40
Game Informer	N/A	7/10
GameRevolution	C	N/A
GameSpot	N/A	7.5/10
GameSpy	N/A	3.5/5
GameTrailers	N/A	8.4/10
GameZone	N/A	8.7/10
IGN	8/10	9/10
Jeuxvideo.com	16/20	16/20
PlayStation Official Magazine – UK	N/A	8/10
411Mania	N/A	8.7/10
Teletext GameCentral	N/A	6/10

The PSP version received "generally favourable reviews", while the PlayStation 2 version received "mixed or average reviews", according to the review aggregation website Metacritic. In Japan, where the former version was ported for release under the name MotorStorm Raging Ice (モーターストーム レイジングアイス, MōtōSutōmu Reijingu Aisu) on 1 November 2009, Famitsu gave it a score of 29 out of 40.
