= MotorStorm (video game) =

2006 video game

- North American cover art
- Developer: Evolution Studios
- Publisher: Sony Computer Entertainment
- Series: MotorStorm
- Platform: PlayStation 3
- Release: JP: 14 December 2006; NA: 6 March 2007; PAL: 23 March 2007
- Genre: Racing
- Modes: Single-player, multiplayer

MotorStorm is a 2006 racing video game developed by Evolution Studios and published by Sony Computer Entertainment for the PlayStation 3. Gameplay is heavily focused on off-road racing at a fictional festival. It was announced at E3 2005, and released in Japan on 14 December 2006 and worldwide in March 2007. The game received a positive reception and sold well and led to a sequel as part of the MotorStorm series, MotorStorm: Pacific Rift (2008).

== Gameplay ==
Gameplay screenshot

The events of the game take place at the fictional MotorStorm Festival in Monument Valley. The objective of the game is to win a series of off-road races and to be the overall winner of the Festival. The player controls up to seven different types of vehicles throughout the game: bikes, ATVs, buggies, rally cars, racing trucks, mudpluggers and big rigs. Each vehicle has its own strengths and weaknesses. For example, dirt bikes are capable of accelerating very fast and are able to maneuver through tight spaces, but they are also easily damaged, and only reach average top speeds. On the other hand, big rigs have great durability, medium speed, but poor acceleration and handling.

Each race requires the player to choose a particular vehicle type and often race against many of the other vehicles. Every track has many different ways of getting through it, each catering to a specific class of vehicle thereby making the racing field more balanced. The events in the game occur in real-time, such as the mud effects, tire marks, and crashes (for example, if a car loses a wheel, it will remain where it lands for the duration of the race). Each track is filled with a variety of jumps, bumps, cliffs, ledges, mud pits, parts from cars, and other obstacles. Races are generally three-lap events with two to fifteen racers. There are nine playable tracks in the game with a further four, which were available to purchase as downloadable content via the PlayStation Store.

Tracks experience real-time deformation, which means each lap is different from the last; obstacles and other elements which are displaced from their original position will remain that way unless they are disturbed again. Larger vehicles can create sizeable holes or leave ruts that can easily disturb smaller, lighter vehicles, and every vehicle responds in different ways to different track environments. Vehicles like big rigs and mudpluggers gain excellent traction in mud, whereas lighter vehicles like dirt bikes and ATVs will slip and slide.

Nitrous boost plays a large part in MotorStorm and is used to either catch up to opponents or pull away from them. Players must keep an eye on their boost meter, which shows how hot the car's engine is. The longer the boost is held, the hotter the engine becomes. If the boost is held when the engine reaches its critical temperature, it will explode. Since explosions resulting from the boost typically rocket the player's vehicle forward, they can be used to edge out another racer across the finish line. This can be very useful when behind, although this does not work all of the time if the AI opponent gains the upper hand.

In online play, Catch-up mode can be enabled. This means the leader of a race has less boost than everyone else, allowing players further back in the field to "catch-up". If the leader changes, so does the racer with less boost. This makes using boost for the leader a technical task. In theory, they should only use it when necessary, and also rely on their individual driving skills to win them the race.

== Development ==
=== E3 video footage ===
The E3 trailer of MotorStorm, which includes crashes between a racing truck and a rally car

While the game was originally being developed under the title Stampede, early details released by Sony and Evolution Studios show high-quality rendered video sequences. Many gaming enthusiasts and members of the press became sceptical as to the source of the material shown, with most people suspecting the footage to be pre-rendered as opposed to real-time in-game footage.

In March 2006, shortly following the Game Developers Conference, leaked footage of a tech demo was spread across the Internet on sites such as YouTube. The demo showed a yellow buggy and a motorbike both cutting through mud, as well as splashing the mud onto a white truck, and showed violent crashes, such as a bike landing on a purple rally car, causing it to spin out, and a white mud plugger ramming through the yellow buggy, causing it to get crushed by rolling over and crossing through flames and crashing into the guardrail. Being a technical demo, it did not show any gameplay aspects or whether the final game would reach the standard of the E3 2005 video. Sony representative Phil Harrison said it would make an appearance at E3 2006. It eventually did, although it missed the first day of the expo due to the show versions being completed and uploaded to LA that day. The build was only 50% complete, but still showed some effects such as motion blur and track deformation.

=== Demos ===
Two demo versions of the game have been made available to the public. The first was only available on PlayStation 3 retail kiosks, while the second was only available for download from the PlayStation Store. While both demos featured the same track, the kiosk demo allowed the player to switch vehicles on the grid before the race starts, which means that it was possible to race in approximately twenty different vehicles, while the downloadable demo restricted players to two vehicles. The downloadable demo had a smoother frame rate and extra visual detail.

Both demos allowed the player to steer using Sixaxis motion-sensing.

=== Downloadable content ===
In 2007, there were several add-ons and DLCs: first one, both in Europe and North America, an add-on was made available on the PlayStation Network in June. This free download, when used in conjunction with the 1.2 update, unlocked a time-trial mode. In this mode, players were able to select a track and vehicle to race around and achieve the best time. When online, players could upload their best times to see where they rank in a global leaderboard. There was also the ability to download the "ghosts" of best laps of other players, including the creators and race against them.

Later in September in Europe, a second add-on was made available for purchase on the PlayStation Network, called the Coyote Revenge Weekend VIP Pass (named Revenge Weekend in North America). This download, when used in conjunction with the 2.0 update, unlocked the Coyote Weekend mode. This allowed players to access an additional three tickets, combining nine races (four races each in the first and second tickets and one final race in the third ticket). The races were unlocked sequentially and via player success in preceding races. The mode is called Coyote Weekend because the track Coyote Revenge features predominantly, and the races were presented as happening over a weekend festival on Saturday and Sunday. Out of the nine races, the Coyote Revenge track was featured five times, with various new routes and shortcuts. Four other tracks were also featured in the Coyote Weekend festival. The download also included two new vehicles, a bike, an ATV and a bonus vehicle that could be accessed upon successful completion of the races. There was also a vehicle pack available on the PlayStation Network, that included a rally car which looks very similar to a DeLorean and a Big Rig which is based on a prison bus, and new livery skins known as Numskull Helmets and Big Blue Bunny.

Also in September in USA, a third add-on was made available which included a truck (known as the Castro Capitano, preceded by the Castro Robusto) with three styles. In October in Europe, a new Halloween livery was made available for download, on the Castro Robusto racing truck. Downloading this livery automatically unlocked the truck (but only for that livery, the others were to be unlocked by progressing in the Festival). The Devil's Weekend pack was released in Europe and North America on November 20 and contained The Devil's Crossing track, nine new races, four new vehicles and new liveries such as Crazy Samurai and QuickFoot. In December in USA, it featured a new downloadable holiday skin for Castro Varadero (a big rig). Two tracks, Eagle's Nest and Diamondback Speedway were released in Europe and North America in January 2008. In North America and Europe, a Chinese New Year skin became available for download for the Wulff Revo rally car in February.

Despite the closure of the multiplayer servers in 2012, it was still possible to download the game updates, as they were required for DLC compatibility. While most PS3 games search for updates from the XMB or after starting them, this game required the user to enter the now-defunct online modes in order to trigger the updating process. The most recent update was version 3.1, but it is no longer officially downloadable, despite the DLC being still available for purchase on the PlayStation Store. However, a workaround for both the multiplayer and the game updates download was found in November 2021.

=== PlayStation Home ===
In PlayStation Home in October 2009, a MotorStorm themed personal apartment was released to all four versions of Home, being Asia, Europe, Japan, and North America. The apartment was called the "MotorStorm Monument Valley Campsite" and could be purchased from the Home Estates store in Home's shopping complex. There were also sixteen MotorStorm themed furniture items that could be purchased to go along with the apartment, including a sofa constructed from a mangled skateboard, the clapped out car seat from one of the original MotorStorm vehicles and a smouldering barbecue cunningly fashioned from an old oil-drum and other undistinguished pieces of junk. These were possible to purchase from the Furniture store in Home's shopping complex.

MotorStorm was featured at E3 2007 as fully supporting game launching in PlayStation Home, but was released without this feature. Its successor, MotorStorm: Pacific Rift, however, did fully support game launching in Home. Although it does not fully support the feature, it could still be game launched through the Universal Game Launching method which does not have all of the features of a game that would have full support for game launching.

== Release ==
MotorStorm was officially released in Japan on 14 December 2006, where it became the best-selling PlayStation 3 game; and in March 2007 in North America and the PAL region, the latter as part of the European PlayStation 3 launch on 23 March. Both the North American and European versions include online play, which was not featured in the Japanese version at the time of its release. Online play for Japan was released in an update on 20 June.

By 9 July 2007, MotorStorm had sold more than one million units in North America. MotorStorm has sold over 3 million units.

As of January 2012, the online multiplayer servers for the game have been permanently shut down.

== Reception ==
Reception

Aggregate score
Aggregator	Score
Metacritic	(JP) 84/100 (US) 82/100

Review scores
Publication	Score
The A.V. Club	B
Edge	8/10
Electronic Gaming Monthly	8/10 (Note: Two critics of Electronic Gaming Monthly gave the game each a score of 7.5/10, and the other gave it 9/10.)
Eurogamer	8/10
Famitsu	30/40
Game Informer	8/10
GameRevolution	B−
GameSpot	7.9/10
GameSpy	4/5
GameTrailers	7.8/10
Hardcore Gamer	3/5
IGN	(UK) 9/10; 8.9/10
PlayStation: The Official Magazine	8.5/10
X-Play	3/5
The Sydney Morning Herald	4/5
USA Today	8.5/10

MotorStorm received "generally favourable reviews" according to the review aggregation website Metacritic. GameSpot praised the game's online aspect saying "Motorstorm's rampageous brand of racing is a great deal of fun" as well as the graphics and soundtrack of the game while noting its lack of offline multiplayer and its single-player mode. IGN summed up its review by saying "it may be shallow, but it's also the most engaging racing experience you'll find anywhere", but expressed its excitement in the potential of its sequel due to the strong foundations the original laid out. However, GameTrailers criticized the AI of the game saying it was based on a "rubber-band" principle which allowed computer drivers to easily catch up regardless of the player's performance, but praised the online gameplay of MotorStorm as well as its physics. GameZone gave the game 8.8 out of 10, saying, "The overall package may feel a little light in terms of variety, but the game is terrific eye candy that plays very well, has a solid challenge and is much fun to play." In Japan, Famitsu gave it a score of 30 out of 40. Mr. Marbles of GamePro said, "I probably wouldn't buy a PS3 just for MotorStorm, but it is the first legitimate must-have title if you've already got one." (Note: GamePro gave the game 4.75/5 for graphics, two 4.5/5 scores for sound and fun factor, and 4/5 for control.)

Maxim gave the game all five stars, saying, "playing MotorStorm is like having sex with one of the Olsen twins: It's awesome, it's brief, the two of you won't really have much to talk about afterward, and you'll be left wondering why the other twin didn't join in." USA Today gave it 8.5 stars out of 10, calling it "white-knuckled racing at its best, with jaw-dropping visuals and explosive action so grimy you may get the urge to take a shower afterward." 411Mania gave it eight out of ten, saying, "If you're looking for a next gen racer full of action and tons of eye candy, this title is for you. It may not have all the added bells and whistles of some racing games, but that is part of its appeal. It's a rugged unapologetic action packed racer. Is it a must have for the PS3? This reviewer says yes. It's a great title with lots to keep you occupied if you like explosions. Seriously, get some friends over and watch the fireballs fly. They will not be disappointed. What Motorstorm [sic] lacks in depth it more than makes up for in high octane action." The Sydney Morning Herald gave it a similar score of four out of five, calling it "Giddy and intense off-road racing shenanigans with stunning presentation." Detroit Free Press gave it three stars out of four, saying, "Sadly, there is no split-screen multiplayer mode. There is an online mode, the same as regular 'Play' mode, except against people all over the world. The graphics, as in all PS3 games, are unbelievably first-rate."

The game received a "Platinum" sales award from the Entertainment and Leisure Software Publishers Association (ELSPA), indicating sales of at least 300,000 units in the UK.

The game was selected as one of Gaming Target's "52 Games We'll Still Be Playing From 2007. During the Academy of Interactive Arts & Sciences' 11th Annual Interactive Achievement Awards, the game won the award for "Racing Game of the Year".
