= PlayStation Vita =

Handheld game console by Sony

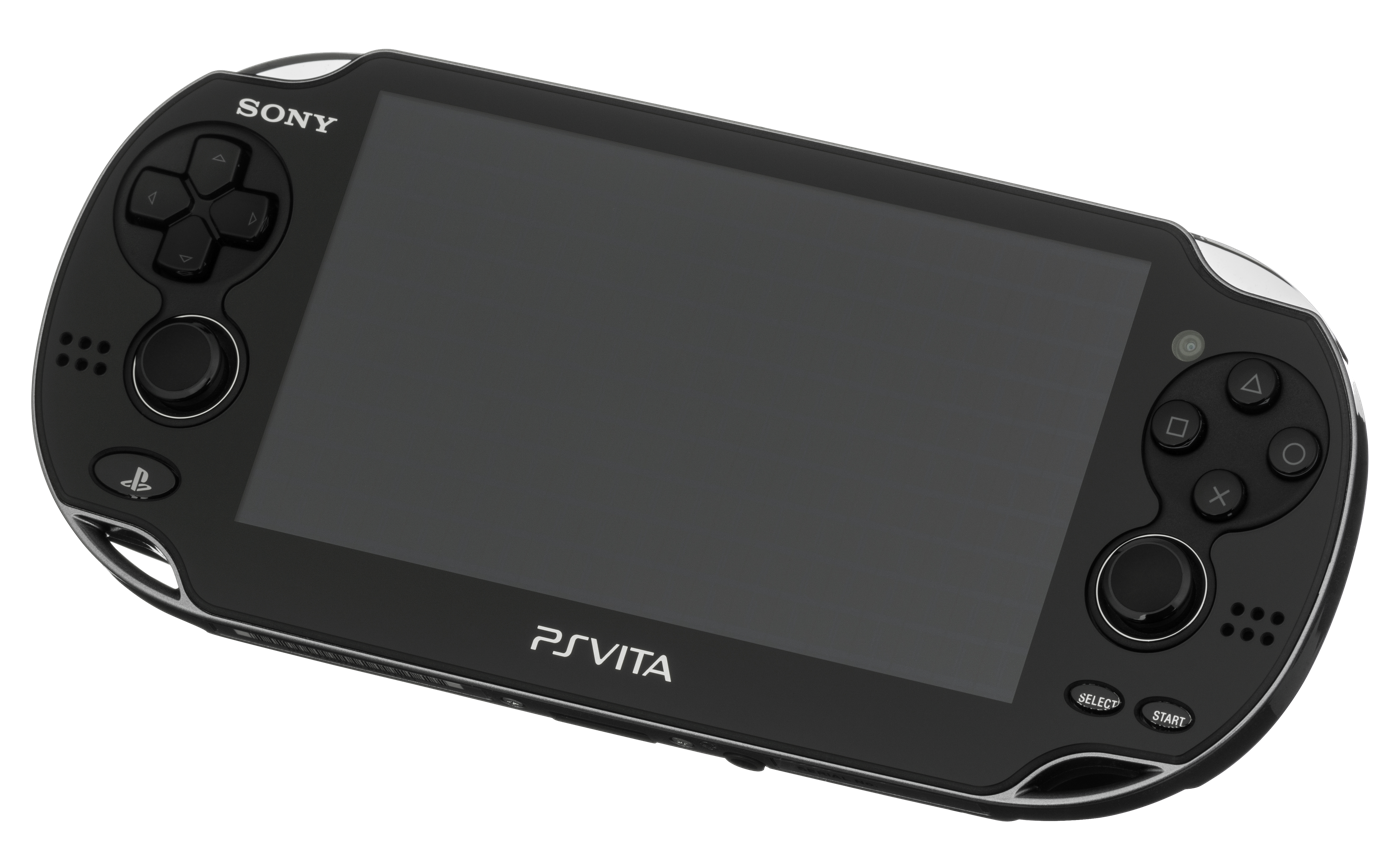
- Original model of the PS Vita (PCH-1000)
- Developer: Sony Computer Entertainment
- Manufacturer: Sony Electronics
- Product family: PlayStation
- Type: Handheld game console
- Generation: Eighth
- Released: December 17, 2011: JP: December 17, 2011; NA: February 15, 2012 (Note: Released on February 15 as a 'First edition' bundle with the game Little Deviants at select retailers. A more sophisticated launch was later done on February 22, 2012 nationwide.); EU: February 22, 2012 Other regions: see (Note: Release date in other regions: ARG/CHL/RUS: February 22, 2012; AU: February 23, 2012; BRA: March 2, 2012; CAN: October 2, 2012 (3G); CHN: March 20, 2015)
- Introductory price: US$249.99 (equivalent to $350 in 2025)
- Discontinued: March 1, 2019
- Units sold: See Reception and sales section (Note: Between the system's launch and January 2013, 4 million units were sold worldwide. Between January 2013 and June 2014, 1,837,710 units were sold within Japan alone. A total of 600,000 units were sold in Spain as of June 2015, and 446,000 units sold in France as of 2014. As of present, no other reliable sales figures have been released.)
- Media: PS Vita Card, digital distribution through PlayStation Network
- Operating system: PlayStation Vita system software
- CPU: Quad-core ARM Cortex-A9 MPCore
- Memory: 512 MB RAM, 128 MB Video RAM
- Storage: 1 GB flash memory (PCH-2000 only)
- Removable storage: Proprietary PS Vita memory card (4, 8, 16, 32 or 64 GB)
- Display: 5-inch (16:9) OLED (PCH-1000)/LCD (PCH-2000) multi-touch capacitive touchscreen, approximately 17 million colors, 960 × 544 qHD @ 220 ppi
- Graphics: Quad-core PowerVR SGX543MP4+
- Sound: Stereo speakers, microphone, 3.5 mm headphone jack, Bluetooth
- Input: Touchscreen; Rear touchpad; Sixaxis motion sensing (Accelerometer + Gyroscope); Three-axis compass; D-pad; 16 × buttons (D-Pad, L, R, Start, Select, PS, Volume ±, Power); 2 × analog sticks
- Camera: Front and back 0.3MP cameras
- Connectivity: Wi-Fi (b/g/n), 3G, Bluetooth 2.1+EDR
- Power: 2210 mAh; PCH-1000: approx. 3–5 hours for games, 5 hours for video, 9 hours for music (in stand-by mode); PCH-2000: approx. 4–6 hours for games, 7 hours for video, 12 hours for music (in stand-by mode)
- Online services: PlayStation Network
- Dimensions: PCH-1000: 83.55 mm (3.289 in) (h); 182 mm (7.2 in) (w); 18.6 mm (0.73 in) (d); PCH-2000: 85.1 mm (3.35 in) (h); 183.6 mm (7.23 in) (w); 15.0 mm (0.59 in) (d)
- Weight: PCH-1000: 260 grams (9.2 oz) (Wi-Fi); 279 grams (9.8 oz) (3G); PCH-2000: 219 grams (7.7 oz) (Wi-Fi)
- Backward compatibility: PlayStation Portable (download only)
- Predecessor: PlayStation Portable
- Related: PlayStation 3 Xperia Play; PlayStation 4 PlayStation TV

The PlayStation Vita (PS Vita) is a handheld game console developed and marketed by Sony Computer Entertainment. It was first released in Japan on December 17, 2011, then in other international territories on February 22, 2012, and was produced until discontinuation on March 1, 2019. The console is the successor to the PlayStation Portable (PSP), and a part of the PlayStation brand of gaming devices; as part of the eighth generation of video game consoles, it primarily competed with the Nintendo 3DS.

The original model of the handheld includes a 5-inch (130 mm) OLED multi-touch capacitive touchscreen, a rear touchpad, two analog joysticks, and front and shoulder push-button input, and supports Bluetooth and Wi-Fi as standard while a variant model was sold with an additional 3G modem. The Vita features a quad-core ARM Cortex-A9 MPCore CPU and a quad-core SGX543MP GPU. The PS Vita 2000 series, a revised version of the system, was released across 2013 and 2014. It has all of the same features with a slightly smaller size, extended battery life, and an LCD panel instead of an OLED. Sony released the PlayStation TV, a short-lived, re-purposed version of the Vita that uses a television screen like a home video game console, discontinued at the end of 2015.

The Vita's design was intended to meld the experience of big-budget, dedicated video game platforms with the then up-and-coming trend of mobile gaming as seen on smart phones and tablets. However, in the year after the device's successful launch, sales of the hardware and its bigger budget games stalled, threatening to end its lifespan. A concentrated effort to attract smaller independent developers in the West, combined with strong support from mid-level Japanese companies, helped keep the platform afloat. Though this led to less diversity in its game library, it strengthened support in JRPGs, visual novels, and Western-developed indie games. This built moderate sales in Japan and a smaller yet passionate userbase in the West. Though Sony has not released exact sales figures, estimates are around 15 to 16 million units. In the platform's later years, Sony promoted the PlayStation Vita's ability to work in conjunction with its other gaming products, such as Remote Play of PlayStation 4 games, similar to the Wii U's function of Off-TV Play. The platform stalled in 2017 upon the release of the Nintendo Switch, and was completely discontinued in 2019. The system is regarded as a commercial failure in the video game industry, and was significantly outsold by the Nintendo 3DS. No direct successor was released by Sony, though in 2023, a similar remote play accessory, the PlayStation Portal, was released for the PlayStation 5.

== History ==
=== Background ===
After the success of Nintendo's Game Boy family of handheld game consoles throughout the 1990s and early 2000s, with little market competition, and Sony's massive success with its PlayStation and PlayStation 2 home video game consoles around the same time, Sony entered the handheld market as well. In 2004, it released the PlayStation Portable (PSP) to compete with the Nintendo DS as part of the seventh generation of video game consoles. After a slow start in the worldwide market, it was invigorated in Japan with multiple releases in the Monster Hunter series. With the series being less popular in western regions, it failed to revive the platform in the same way. The PSP ended up being a mixed result for the company. It was seen as a success in that it was the only handheld video game platform that had ever significantly competed with Nintendo for market share, with almost 80 million units sold in its lifespan, roughly the same amount as Nintendo's Game Boy Advance had during the sixth generation of video game consoles. This is only a little more than half of the sales of its actual market competitor, the DS, which was more than 150 million units by the end of 2011.

Rumors of a successor to the PSP came as early as July 2009 when Eurogamer reported that Sony was working on such a device, which would utilize the PowerVR SGX543MP processor and perform at a level similar to the original Xbox. Through mid-2010, websites continued to run stories about accounts of the existence of a "PSP 2". Reports arose during the Tokyo Game Show that the device was unveiled internally during a private meeting during mid-September held at Sony Computer Entertainment's headquarters in Aoyama, Tokyo. Shortly after, reports of development kits for the handheld had reportedly already been shipped to numerous video game developers including both first-party and third-party developers to start making games for the device, a report later confirmed by Mortal Kombat Executive Producer Shaun Himmerick. By November, Senior Vice President of Electronic Arts, Patrick Soderlund, confirmed that he had seen that the PlayStation Portable successor existed, but could not confirm details. In the same month, VG247 released pictures of an early prototype version showing a PSP Go-like slide-screen design along with two analog sticks, two cameras and a microphone, though the report mentioned that overheating issues had since caused them to move away from the design in favor of a model more similar to the original PlayStation Portable device.

Throughout 2010, Sony would not confirm these reports of a PSP successor but would make comments regarding making future hardware. Shuhei Yoshida, President of SCE Worldwide Studios revealed that his studio, despite usually being more involved with software, had a continued role in future hardware development at the time. In December, Sony Computer Entertainment CEO Kazuo Hirai stated that Sony aimed to appeal to a wide demographic of people by using multiple input methods on future hardware; buttons and joysticks for traditional handheld game system users, and touchscreens for smart phone users. The device was officially announced by Sony on January 27, 2011, at their "PlayStation Meeting" press conference held by the company in Japan. The system, only known by its code name "Next Generation Portable" (NGP), was announced to be a handheld gaming device that aimed for PlayStation 3 quality visuals, which was later clarified to not be taken at a literal level because, according to David Coombes, platform research manager at Sony Computer Entertainment America, "Well, it's not going to run at 2 GHz [like the PS3] because the battery would last five minutes and it would probably set fire to your pants". Its power was later described by Sony engineers as about halfway between the PSP and PS3. As rumors had suggested, the device was designed to present "the best of both worlds" between mobile and handheld gaming, including a 5-inch OLED touchscreen, a rear touchpad coupled with physical buttons and dual analog sticks. Sony also revealed that the device would be using a mix of retail and digital distribution of games. Further details were announced at Game Developers Conference 2011, including that Sony would be dropping the PSP's UMD disc format in favor of small game cartridges of 2 GB or 4 GB size variants, along with two cameras, facial detection, head detection and tracking capabilities.

=== Launch and early years ===
On June 6, 2011, at E3 2011, Sony announced that the device's official name would be the PlayStation Vita, with the word "vita" being Latin for "life". Mark Cerny was the lead architect of the device. Despite reports of the 2011 earthquakes in Japan delaying the release of the device, Sony reconfirmed that it was on track for a late 2011 release in Japan and a February 2012 release date for other major regions of the world. The release date was later narrowed down to a December 17, 2011, release in Japan, and a February 22, 2012, release date for America and Europe, although a limited edition was released a week earlier in North America on February 15, 2012, which included the 3G/Wi-Fi model of the device, the game Little Deviants, a limited-edition carry case, and a 4 GB memory card. The Vita launched with 26 titles in Japan, with Sony announcing that there were over 100 titles in development prior to the system's release overall. The Vita launched in the west with 25 titles, including original titles such as Uncharted: Golden Abyss and Wipeout 2048, and ports of games such as FIFA 12 and Rayman Origins.

The sales of the Vita started strong at launch but then stalled and greatly underperformed. The Vita had a strong launch in Japan, selling over 300,000 units in its first week of availability, though figures shortly afterwards shrunk down 78% to under 73,000 sold in its second week, and then settled into about 12,000 sold per week in the following weeks. Similarly, in the United States, the system debuted with 200,000 units sold in the first month, before slinking down into an amount of about 50,000 a month. 1.2 million units were reported as sold as of February 26, 2012 – after it had launched in most regions. The system continued to get high-profile games over the course of 2012, including Gravity Rush, LittleBigPlanet PS Vita, Sonic & All-Stars Racing Transformed, Persona 4 Golden, Assassin's Creed III: Liberation, and Call of Duty: Black Ops: Declassified. Despite this, the system still only managed to sell 4 million units worldwide in its first 10 months on the market, and estimated by analysts to only be at 6 million units sold after two years of availability. After 2012, Sony ceased releasing direct sales figures of the Vita, instead opting to release combined sales figures with it and the PSP. Still, the system under-performed; while Sony projected selling 16 million units of combined Vita and PSP systems, it had to slash its forecast twice in the same year—down to 12 and then 10 million units sold.

With higher-profile games not pushing the system sales enough in 2012, big third-party companies like Ubisoft and Activision started reducing or eliminating support for the system, especially in the West. Additionally, while the Monster Hunter series had significantly boosted the sales of the PSP, its absence instead hurt the Vita. Its developer, Capcom, had decided to release Monster Hunter Tri and future Monster Hunter games exclusively on the Nintendo 3DS, where it would sell millions of copies for Sony's main competitor. With support diminishing, Shahid Ahmad, Sony's Director of Strategic Content, instead began a new approach to software, through directly reaching out to, and making accommodations for, smaller, independent developers who had previously released games for mobile and PC platforms. While not completely reversing the sales trends of the Vita, the lower costs of making or porting smaller-budget games made it easier for developers to make a profit on the system's smaller userbase, and in turn, increased consumer attention on the console, keeping the device afloat. Fez, Spelunky, Hotline Miami, and OlliOlli all found success with releases on Vita. Ahmad also maintained interest in the device by directly interacting with consumers on social media; the game Tales of Hearts R was localized into English only because it was number one in a survey of games desired on the platform. Sony continued to support the system with games through 2013 as well, albeit lesser so, with titles such as Killzone: Mercenary and Tearaway, along with a handful of other Western-developed ports such as FIFA 13 and Rayman Legends.

While the focus on indie games kept the device afloat in the West, in Japan, no such measures were necessary, as the Vita maintained moderate hardware sales. While it was routinely outsold by its main competitor, the Nintendo 3DS, the Vita still managed to be one of the top consoles sold overall, partially due to Japan's preference towards handheld gaming. Strong support by Japanese developers also helped, with companies such as Bandai Namco, Falcom, Koei Tecmo, 5pb, Compile Heart, Spike Chunsoft, and Atlus releasing many games in the JRPG and visual novels genre to help keep a steady flow of mid-level releases coming to the system. Additionally, big games such as Final Fantasy X/X-2 HD Remaster sold well and roughly in-line with their home console counterparts. The heavier support from Japan, in turn, also helped support the system in the West as well, with many games in the Atelier, Ys, Danganronpa, Persona, and Trails series localized into English on the Vita, or made playable through the system's backward compatibility with digital PSP games.

While the system managed to stay afloat as a minor success, other issues continued to persist, including the high price of the system in comparison to its main competitor, the Nintendo 3DS, and its sibling device, the PS3, the high price of its memory cards used for game and data storage, and the increasing popularity of smartphones and tablets. In August 2013, Sony addressed the first two, dropping the price to $199 in North America and €199 in Europe, and cutting the suggested retail price of the memory cards as well. The price cut also coincided with the release of a slight redesign of the system, the "PS Vita 2000" model. The redesign included making the system 20% thinner and 15% lighter, while adding 1 GB of internal storage, and an extra hour of battery life. However, the redesign did remove the OLED screen in favor of a cheaper LCD screen.

=== Shifting focus ===
Towards the end of 2013, around the launch of Sony's next video game device, the home video game console the PlayStation 4, Sony began making comments in regard to the change in focus with the Vita. Yoshida stated that Sony would be releasing fewer first party games for the platform. Sony Computer Entertainment's Product Planning & Platform Software Innovation Director Don Mesa stated that the "economics simply don't work with the traditional process". Sony addressed the "economics of Vita game development" issue with beginning on focusing on the fact that almost all PlayStation 4 games could be streamed and played through a Vita through Remote Play. Sony attempted to attach the device to the PS4 due to its extreme popularity; it took only a few weeks for the sales to surpass the sales of the Vita over the course of almost two years. In July 2014, Yoshida stated that the company would focus on it less as a dedicated handheld video game console, and more on its combination of uses, stating "it's not about individual Vita games any more. It's more about how Vita can have multiple uses – with PS4 Remote Play, PS3 games with PS Now, and the dedicated games. The whole ecosystem with PS4 at the center, the Vita's a part of that." Sony later announced that the Vita will have PlayStation VR integration in the form of a second screen as well. Open beta trials for PlayStation Now functionality on the PS Vita began on October 14, 2014, in North America. The PlayStation TV, released across late 2013 and 2014, also aimed to expand the system's userbase by allowing for Vita games to be played on a television like a home console, though the device was discontinued in the West by the end of 2015, and did not fare well in Japan's handheld-focused region either. In November 2014, SCEA president Shawn Layden suggested that the new approach was working on hardware level, stating that Vita sales had increased since the implementation of PS4 Remote Play, though he and another Sony representative did not give specific figures. Sony continued to make games for the device, though in smaller number than in past. The last major Sony-developed title, Freedom Wars, still found success, selling over 188,000 copies in its first week of release in Japan. The debut was the highest Sony game debut for the system, and the second highest, only to Namco Bandai's late 2013 release of God Eater 2 on the platform.

In September 2015, Yoshida stated that Sony had no current plans for a Vita successor, stating that "climate is not healthy for now because of the huge dominance of mobile gaming." At E3 2015, he had stated that Sony would not be making any more AAA, big budget games to the system, but by October, the comment had been revised that Sony would not be making any more games for it at all. Reasons cited included the company focusing on supporting the PS4, and the fact that it felt that third party Japanese developers and Western indie developers were sufficiently supporting the device. In March 2016, Sony announced that instead, it would be forming a new company, "Forward Works", and be instead concentrating on bringing PlayStation-based games to mobile platforms like iOS and Android.

Despite Sony's focus on the PS4 and mobile for the future, the Vita still continued to receive substantial third-party company game support in the way of Japanese-style role-playing games and visual novels and Western-style indie video games through 2017. Minecraft in particular was successful for the platform, with it selling over 1.2 million physical copies in Japan alone as of September 2017. The device is considered to have sold fairly well in Japan, and still a crucial part of Sony's overall strategy in the region, while Sony has acknowledged that the device still has a very vocal and passionate user-base in the West as well, with the company still encouraging third-party companies to create games for the device. At the 2016 Game Developers Conference, research analyst firm EEDAR estimated the sales of the Vita to be about at 10 million units sold through the end of 2015. Multi-platform releases with the PS4 have also incidentally helped sustain the Vita's stream of software, even in the west, through 2016 and 2017; games receive a Vita version more to appeal to Japan's larger Vita user-base, and receive a PS4 version more to appeal to North America's larger user-base. The March 2017 launch of the Nintendo Switch, which operates on a similar concept of providing high budget video games on a portable unit, further overshadowed the Vita, though niche support through indie games and JRPGs continued into the year. In mid-2017, Glixel estimated the Vita userbase to be around 15.5 million.

On September 20, 2018, Sony announced at Tokyo Game Show 2018 that the Vita would be discontinued in 2019, ending its hardware production. Production of new physical Vita games in Europe and America ceased by the end of Sony's 2018 fiscal year, which ended on March 31, 2019. At the time of the announcement, USgamer estimated that the Vita userbase had grown to approximately 16 million units. Production of Vita hardware officially ended on March 1, 2019. In March 2021, Sony announced that the Vita's online storefront would be closing on August 27, 2021, making it impossible to purchase digital games for the platform, though still allowing for the download of previously purchased games; this decision was later reversed following consumer backlash.

On July 1, 2026, Sony announced that the PlayStation Vita's online store would be shutting down for good, citing incompatibility with "updated payment processing standards". The storefront is set to shut down in July 2027.

== Hardware ==

In line with Sony's ambition to combine aspects of traditional video game consoles with mobile devices like smartphones and tablets, the Vita contains a multitude of input methods. The device features a "super oval" shape similar to the design of the original PlayStation Portable, with a 5-inch (130 mm) qHD OLED capacitive touchscreen in the centre of the device. The device features two analog sticks, a D-pad, a set of standard PlayStation face buttons ( and), two shoulder buttons (L and R), a PlayStation button and Start and Select buttons. Motion control is also possible through Sony's Sixaxis motion sensing system, consisting of a three-axis gyroscope and a three-axis accelerometer. In addition to these input methods, specific to just the Vita, is a secondary touchpad that is on the back of the device.

Other hardware includes stereo speakers, a microphone, built-in Wi-Fi, and Bluetooth 2.1+EDR connectivity, and two cameras. The cameras are both 0.3 megapixel and run at 640×480 (VGA) at 60 frames/s, or at 320×240 at 120 frames/s. They can be used to take photos or videos using built-in applications on the system. The two cameras feature the abilities of face detection, head detection, and head tracking. The platform also launched with a model with 3G mobile data support, which required a separate data plan through a data provider. The 3G service has been partnered with NTT DoCoMo in Japan, AT&T in the US, Rogers in Canada and Vodafone in Europe and Australia. The 3G model was discontinued in 2013 and not made available in the system's future revised models.

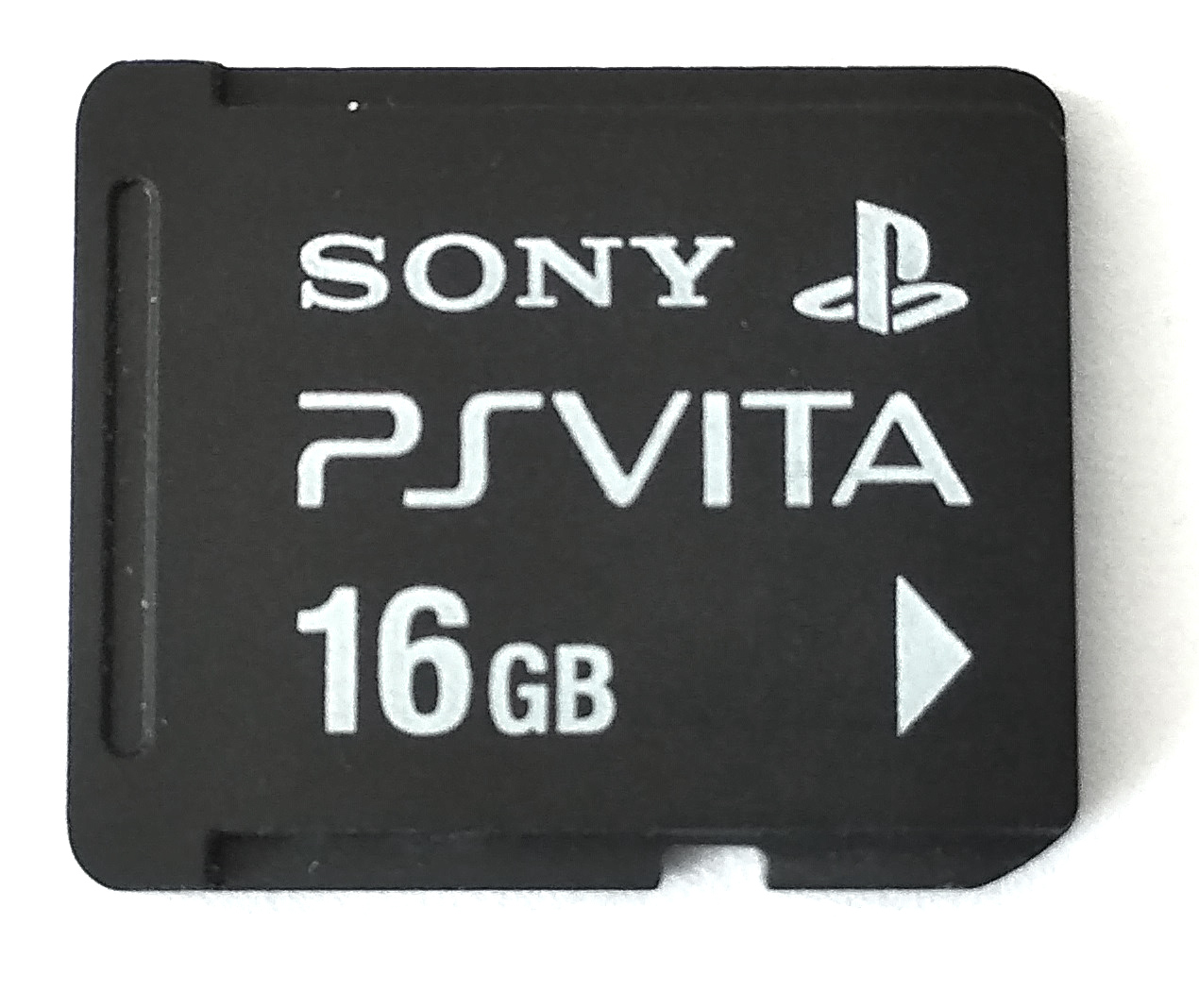
The proprietary PlayStation Vita memory card (16 GB version)

Internally, the device features a custom system on chip with a quad-core ARM Cortex-A9 MPCore processor and a quad-core GPU SGX543MP4+. Sony has stated that the Vita generally runs well under its full clock speed but due to overheating and battery consumption issues that would ensue, Sony placed its processing power "around halfway between the current PSP and the PS3". The Vita's internal battery has between 3–5 hours of power for game playing, depending on the processing power required for the game, screen brightness, sound level and network connections, as well as other factors. Additionally, the battery can supply about five hours for video watching, and up to nine hours of music listening with the screen off. The system does allow for additional external battery solutions as well. The PlayStation Vita has 512 MB of system RAM and 128 MB of VRAM. The amount of RAM allows cross-game chat to be used on the system.

Software for the PlayStation Vita is distributed on a proprietary flash memory card called "PlayStation Vita game card" rather than on Universal Media Discs (UMDs) as used by the PlayStation Portable. The shape and size of the card itself is very similar to an SD card. 5–10% of the game card's space is reserved for game save data and patches. The PS Vita is incompatible with standard memory cards, such as SD cards, and instead stores data on proprietary PS Vita memory cards, which are available in sizes of 4 GB, 8 GB, 16 GB, 32 GB and 64 GB. Initially, a maximum of 100 applications and games can be stored on the device at a time, regardless of data storage available. When the limit is reached, applications or games must be moved or deleted in order to access those beyond the limit. This limit was later raised to 500 applications in system software version 3.10 released in 2014. Due to the high price of official Sony memory cards, inexpensive third-party "SD2Vita" adapter cards which allow the use of commodity micro SD storage media in conjunction with a modified console appeared on the market during the later years of the handheld's lifespan. In 2018, the LOLIcon plugin allowed the Vita's CPU to be overclocked to 494 MHz, above its officially supported maximum of 444 MHz.

=== Remote Play interactivity with PlayStation 4 ===
All games developed for the PlayStation 4, with the exception of games requiring the use of special peripherals such as PlayStation Camera, are playable on the Vita through Remote Play. With the use of a Vita, PS4, and PS4 game, this allows a PS4 game to be run on the PS4, but its output transmitted to the Vita, with the Vita being used for the controller input, and the image and sound being transmitted to the Vita's screen and speakers instead of a television. The result is similar to what a Wii U console does with its GamePad controller through Off-TV Play. The Vita technically has Remote Play functionality with the PlayStation 3 as well, though very few PS3 games supported the feature due to limitations with the less-powerful PS3 hardware. More PS3 games are available for streaming on the Vita through Sony's cloud gaming service PlayStation Now, though they are streamed over the internet in the form of cloud computing rather than directly from a physical PS3 console. First implemented in 2014, the service was announced to be discontinued on the Vita on August 15, 2017.

=== Revised model ===
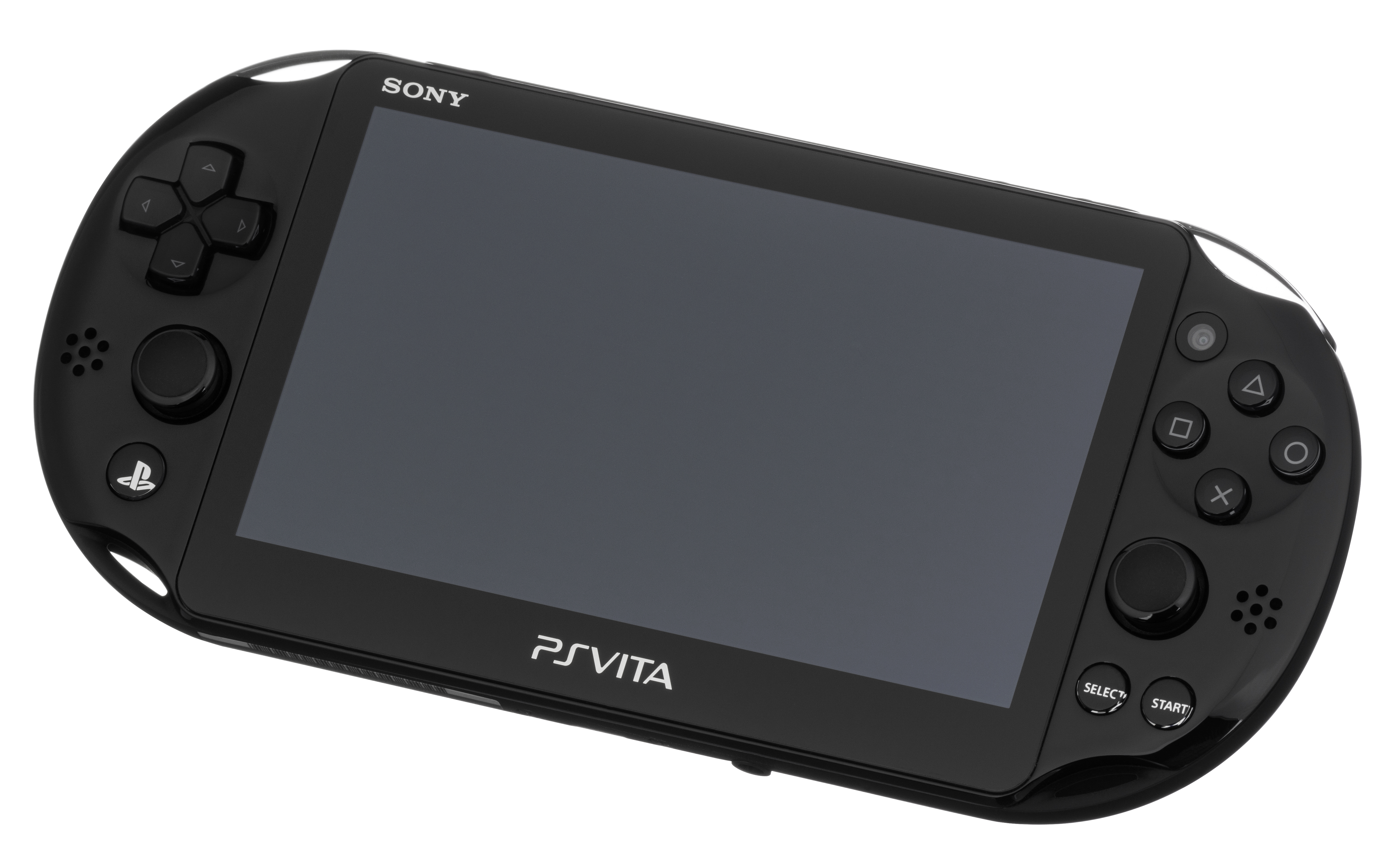
The second-generation PS Vita system, PCH-2000

A revised model of the Vita was released in Japan on October 10, 2013, in Europe on February 7, 2014 and in North America on May 6, 2014. The revised model, officially called the PCH-2000 series and commonly referred to as the PS Vita Slim, is 20% thinner and 15% lighter compared to the original model. While it largely maintains the original's overall structure and layout, the original's OLED screen has been replaced with a lower-cost LCD. The model also roughly added about an extra hour of battery life. The newer model also comes with 1 GB of internal storage memory, although it is not possible to use both the internal memory and memory card concurrently. Upon inserting a PS Vita memory card, the system will offer to copy the existing data from the internal memory to the new card. This model has a micro USB Type B port, which can be used to charge the device along with any standard micro USB cable. The model was released in six colors in Japan (white, black, light blue, yellow, pink, and olive green), although it was only released in black and light blue in North America and Europe.

=== PlayStation TV ===
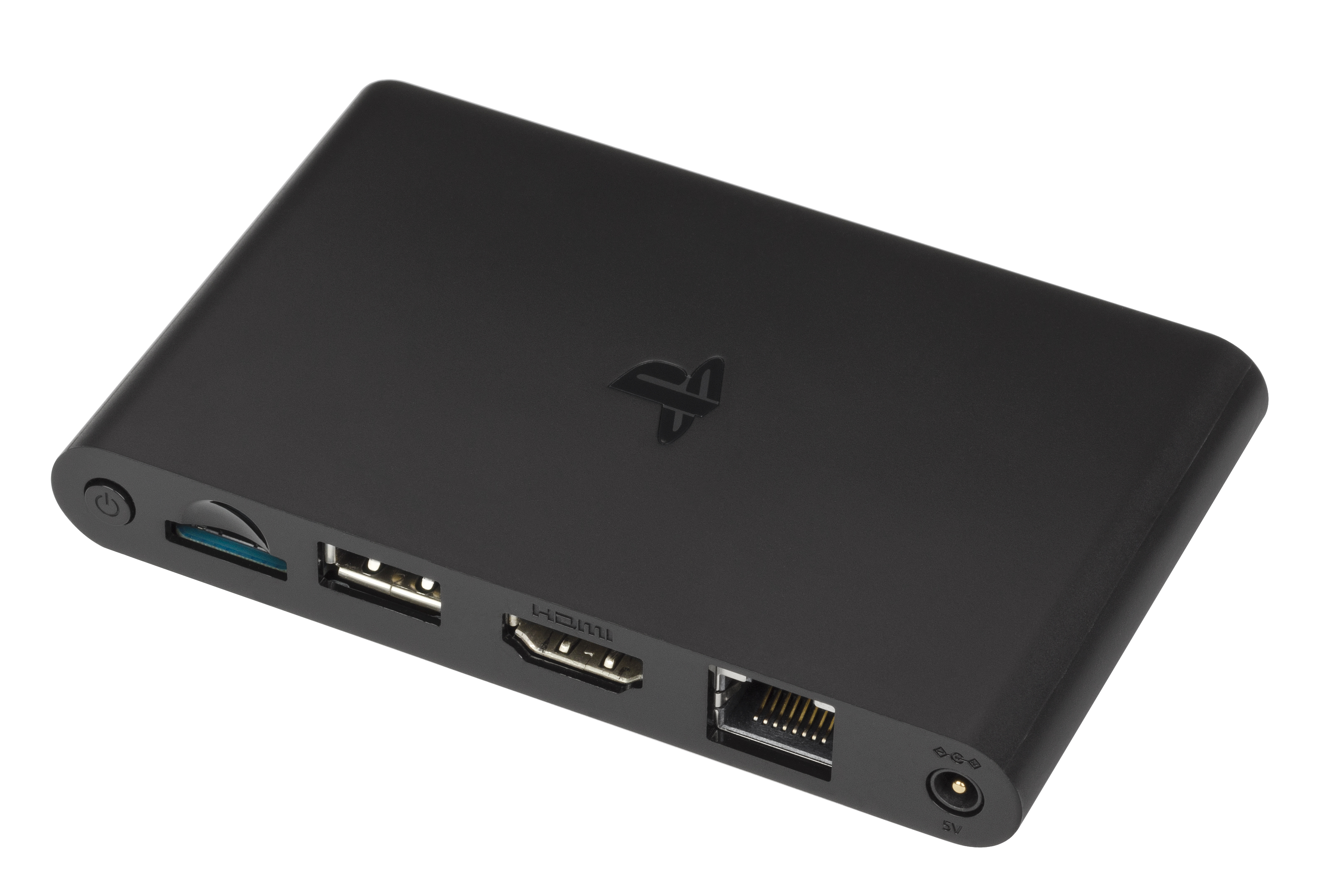
A picture of the PlayStation Vita TV, showing the ports on its back side

The PlayStation TV is a non-portable variant of the Vita; instead of featuring its own display screen, it connects to a television via HDMI like a traditional home video game console, and is controlled though the use of a DualShock 3 or DualShock 4 controller. Due to the difference in controller input between the Vita and a DualShock controller, Vita games that are dependent on the system's touch-screen, rear touchpad, microphone, or camera are not compatible. It also shares the Remote Play and PS Now functionality of a regular Vita. The system was released in Japan in November 2013, in North America in October 2014, and in Europe on November 14, 2014. The device did not fare well and had a short retail shelf life in North America and Europe, where it was discontinued at the end of 2015.

== Software ==
=== Game library ===
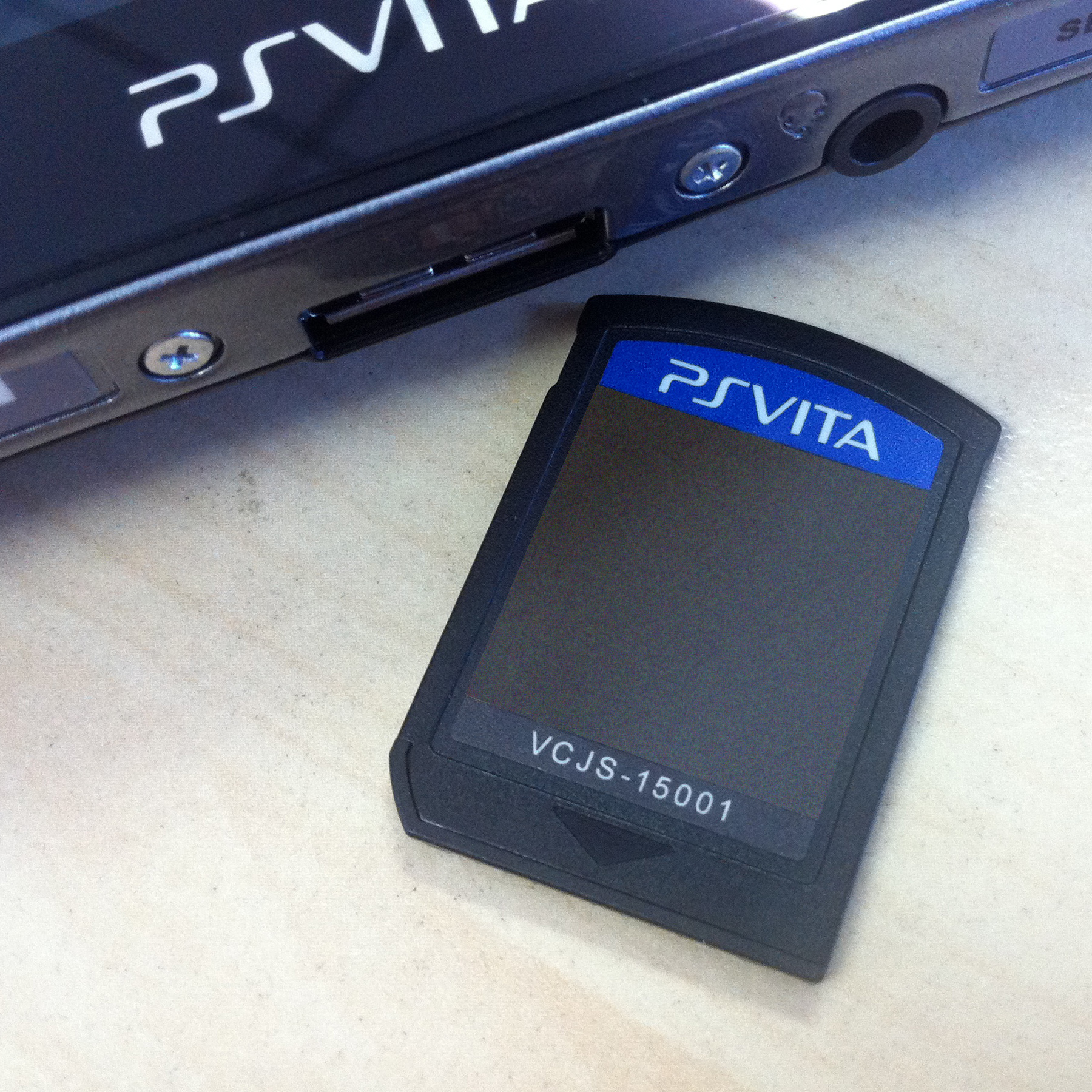
PlayStation Vita game card

Physical software for the Vita is distributed on a proprietary flash memory card called "PlayStation Vita game card". All Vita games are also made available to be downloaded digitally on the PlayStation Network via the PlayStation Store, although not all games are released physically. Since its launch, digital-only releases have slowly become more prominent, partially in an effort to reduce production costs for release on the platform's comparatively smaller user-base, and partially due to the influx smaller-scale indie mobile phone games that have always been digital-only releases. Like the PS3 and PS4, the Vita contains Trophy support for games.

The system was designed so that it would be easy for developers to extract PS3 game assets and in turn use them to make Vita versions of games. Prior to the Vita's release, several third-party studios showcased tech demos of the device by exporting existing assets from their PlayStation 3 counterpart and then rendering them on the device, high budget examples including Metal Gear Solid 4: Guns of the Patriots, Yakuza 4, and Lost Planet. While none of these particular high budget tech demos materialized into actual game releases, and few big-budget Western games would be made for both outside of PlayStation All-Stars Battle Royale, many Japanese development teams would go on to develop mid-level games that would release for both platforms, including the first two games from Falcom's Trails of Cold Steel series and many entries from Tecmo Koei's Atelier and Dynasty Warriors series. The trend continued on the PS4 as well, with Vita/PS4 releases becoming common due to the spread of their userbases – Vita versions for Japan, where the Vita was larger in its initial years, and PS4 versions of games for North America and Europe, where the PS4 userbase was substantially larger. Few PlayStation 2 titles were ported to the Vita due to the PS2's complicated architecture– games that did, such as Final Fantasy X/X2 Remaster and Persona 4 Golden required extensive reworking, or were based on their PS3 counterparts, such as Jak and Daxter Collection, Ratchet and Clank Collection, and Sly Cooper Collection. Towards the end of its lifespan, Vita versions of games began to be cancelled, in favor of PS4 or Nintendo Switch releases.

=== Backward compatibility ===
The device is backward compatible with most PSP games; however, its lack of a UMD disc drive limits this capability to those titles which have been digitally released on the PlayStation Network via the PlayStation Store, but not physical PSP games or films. The Vita is also backward compatible with the majority of the PS one Classics – the group of PlayStation 1 games Sony has made available digitally for download, and PlayStation Minis – small-budget downloadable titles originally created for the PSP and PS3. Games from Sony's PlayStation Mobile initiative had initially been compatible but were removed when the service was shut down in September 2015. In Japan, select downloadable PC Engine and PocketStation titles became backward compatible as well.

=== Applications ===
A number of applications are available to run on the Vita, some initially pre-loaded on the device, while others are available via Sony's PlayStation Store. Pre-loaded apps include a web browser, a "Content Manager" app for monitoring data saved to the device, an email client, a music app, a photo app, and a video player. The system's web browser supports HTML5, cookies, and JavaScript, but not Adobe Flash. Also included was "Near", a social media/GPS like app that allowed the user to see other Vita players in the area, and what games or applications they had been using, with the opportunity for some limited interactivity and communication, although most of its functionality was disabled in 2015.

A number of other third-party apps commonly found on mobile devices have also been made available on the Vita: Crunchyroll, Facebook (removed in 2015), Flickr (broken), Google Maps (removed in 2015), Hulu, Live Tweet (Sony's third-party client for Twitter), MLB.tv (broken), Netflix, Redbox Instant (discontinued), Skype (removed in 2016), TuneIn (broken), Twitch, WeatherNation and YouTube (removed in 2015). Facebook, Flickr, Google Maps, Twitter and YouTube no longer function as Vita apps, but continue to be available by using the Vita's web browser.

=== System software ===
LiveArea, the user interface for the Vita

Unlike the PSP and PlayStation 3, the PlayStation Vita does not use the XrossMediaBar interface. Instead, it uses a touchscreen-based UI dubbed LiveArea, which includes various social networking features via the PlayStation Network. Each game or application is represented by its own circle icon, and selecting it leads the user to a panel with multiple options present, including running software itself, going to its respective website through the internet, seeing if there are downloadable updates available for the software, and seeing a newsfeed-like list of activities related to it, such as installing it or obtaining trophies, for both the user and others the user has interacted with recently.

== Reception and sales ==
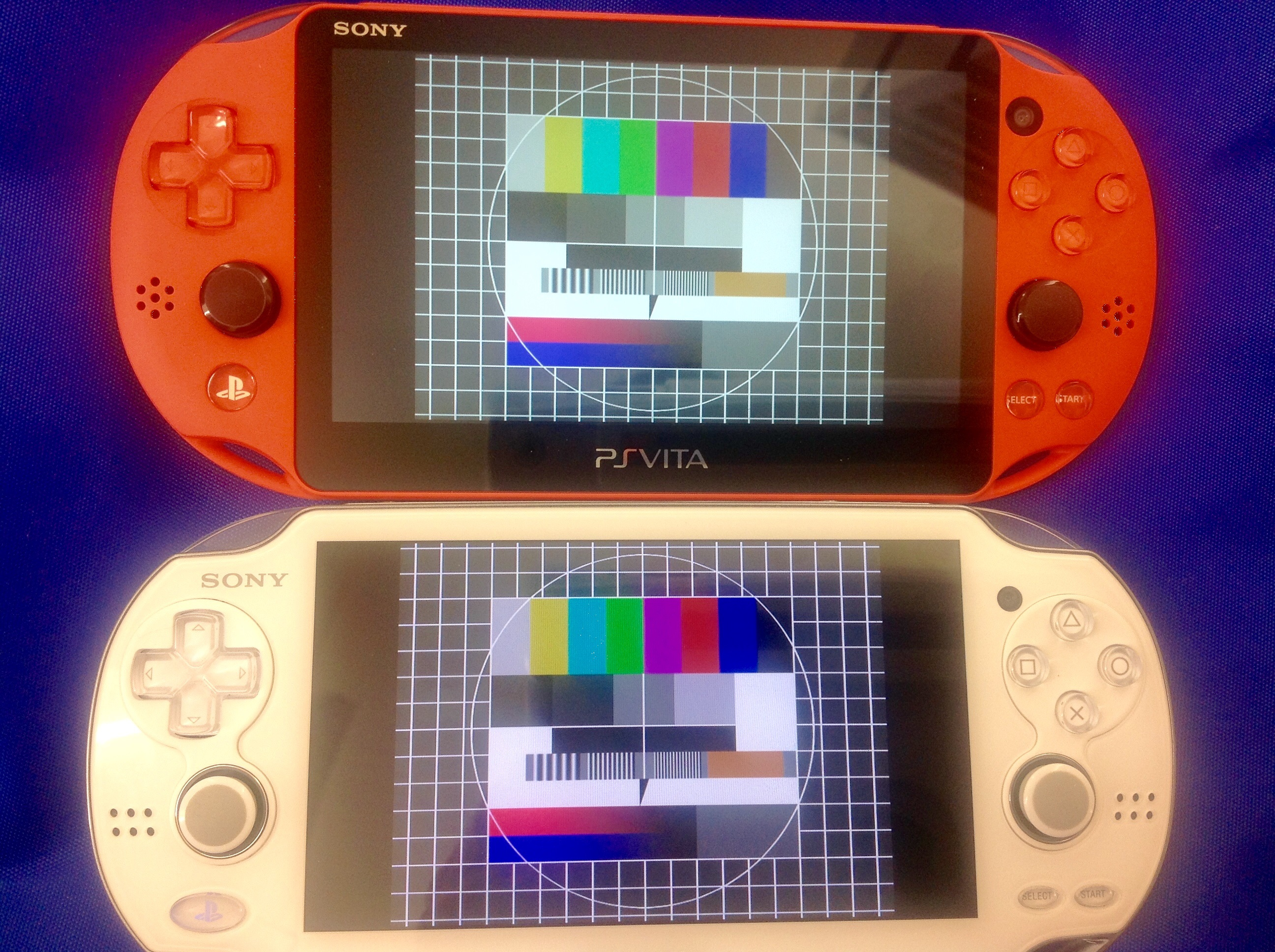
Comparison of the PCH-1000 (white) and PCH-2000 (red), showing the differing displays used

The PlayStation Vita was generally well-received with critics, but decision to change from OLED to LCD screen in the revised model drew mixed reactions, and received criticism for lacking a more compelling library and the high price of its memory cards.

According to review aggregator Metacritic, the Vita's original hardware release was generally well-received with critics, although a few concerns persisted as well. Metacritic editor Jason Dietz noted that reviewers tended to praise the Vita's actual hardware design and operating system, but expressed some concern on its practicality, namely competing in 2012 onward, with a large size and price, where mobile phones with large screens and cheap games were prevalent as an alternative. As of its initial Western launch in February 2012, out of 44 professional critic reviews, 9 fell in the "Great" rating, 29 in the "Good" rating, 6 in the "Mixed" rating, and 0 in the "Bad" or "Awful" rating. Will Freeman of The Guardian praised the Vita's design and controls, but questioned whether the handheld could appeal beyond dedicated gamers as smartphones and tablets became more popular.

The high price of its proprietary memory cards was widely criticized. Engadget considered the Vita launched with "prohibitively expensive custom memory cards" and later stated that the cards were "outrageously priced". GameSpot considered their price was "grossly inflated" while The Verge remarked that their price was "extraordinarily high" compared to common SD cards.

Its initial launch sales were generally seen as positive, selling over 300,000 units in Japan, and 200,000 units in North America. However, a large dropoff occurred in both regions. In Japan, second-week sales dropped 78%, and leveled off at selling about 12,000 units per week. Similarly, sales dropped off to about 30,000 to 50,000 units sold per month for the year after launch in North America. Overall, Sony fell far short of the worldwide sales targets of 10 million Vitas sold by the end of March 2013. The device sold 1.2 million units as of the end of February 2012, 4 million by the end of 2012, and were only estimated by analysts to have reached 6 million by the end of 2013, figures that have not been confirmed due to Sony's ceasing to release Vita sales figures after hitting the 4 million mark at the end of 2012.

Views on the hardware dropped to more moderate levels in 2013, after the platform's initial sales lulls. Surveys in Japan showed that consumers were not purchasing the device due to its high retail price and perceived lack of software variety, and that current Vita owners only showed a 46% rate of approval for the device and its software library. Similarly, many Western critics felt that the low sales through 2013 would lead to an early death for the product.

From 2013 onward, Sony was able to reverse the trajectory of the system by changing focus, aiming to be more of a niche product than one with mass market appeal – focusing more on small Western mobile phone games and mid-level Japanese developed games, and attaching it to the rise of popularity of its PlayStation 4 platform with its remote play connectivity functions. Sony also released the Vita model revision, the PCH-2000, which was generally well received by critics as well for addressing a number of prior complaints about the system, which included a price and size reduction. However, reviewers felt more mixed on the decision to change from OLED to LCD screen in the revised model, with some feeling it led to a minor downgrade in image quality.

While not giving specific figures, Sony stated that Vita sales beat projections in North America in 2014, which it was happy and surprised with, sometimes even falling out of stock. Similar response was found in the UK as well. The platform has been considered to have sold well in Japan, where it outsold the PS4 in 2015, and reached 5 million units sold in 2016 according to sales tracker Media Create. It also obtained million-selling software in the same year, with the Japanese Vita release of Minecraft. By the end of 2015, research firm EEDAR estimated the sales of the Vita worldwide to be around 10 million. Despite the smaller userbase, the platform continued to be viable for game releases into 2017 due to the high attach rate of software sold per hardware user. Limited Run Games and various indie game developers praised the platform for its wide selection of more original and niche video games, and the strong respective sales of them. In mid-2017, Glixel estimated that approximately 15 million units of the system had been sold, while by September 2018, USGamer estimated it had grown to about 16 million units.

In a 2021 retrospective by The Verge, Sony employees attributed several factors to the Vita's poor sales in contrast to the PSP, which had an estimated 80 million sales in its lifetime; a similar drop had been seen by Nintendo with its transition from the Nintendo DS to the Nintendo 3DS. Christian Phillips, a former senior director in Sony, said they had underestimated the impact of mobile gaming at the time of the Vita's release. They had considered gaming on smartphones to be "just good enough for gameplay" and instead felt tablet computers to be more their competitors to the Vita, according to Phillips. While some technologists in Sony had cautioned that mobile device computational power could outpace current consoles around 2010–2011, the design of the Vita did not incorporate this caution. Thus, the Vita was released at the same time that mobile gaming was greatly expanding, losing potential consumers to that market.

John Koller, the former vice president of marketing at Sony, also believed that the Vita had been released too late into the main PlayStation console cycle and too close to the PlayStation 4's release in November 2013. As one of Sony's flagship products, many of their first-party developers had put more focus on games for that system rather than the Vita as a result. The lack of interest from Sony's first-party teams reverberated to third-party developers, who felt the Vita was not worth the effort to develop for over the upcoming PlayStation 4, leaving the Vita without a strong software library. Koller believed that if the Vita had launched earlier into the PlayStation 3's lifecycle, they would have been able to capture more interest from developers during that time and build out a more compelling library for the Vita.

Shuhei Yoshida considered that the reasons for the PlayStation Vita's failure comprised its proprietary memory cards which he acknowledged were "incredibly expensive" alongside its back touchpad which was not used by many games, both of which "just added more costs for the consumer". Yoshida considered that the main reason for its failure was Sony's lack of enough resources to support both the Vita and PlayStation 3 concurrently, especially with the PlayStation 4 on the horizon, stating that "I think the biggest reason Vita didn't do as well as we had hoped was we had to split all our efforts and resources into two different platforms" and noted that the company "didn't have that resource".

== Legacy and impact ==
The Vita was considered a commercial failure for Sony. In 2018, Sony announced there would be no successor to the Vita/PSP line of handhelds. With the success of the Nintendo Switch and Steam Deck handhelds moving into the 2020s, publications questioned Sony's decision to abandon the market. In 2023, Sony announced "Project Q", a controller with an 8-inch screen for the PlayStation 5 that would replicate the experience of remote play on a Vita or Off-TV Play of the Wii U GamePad. The product was later named PlayStation Portal and was released on November 15, 2023. In 2026, Sony announced that the Vita's digital store, along with that of the PlayStation 3, will be shut down worldwide in July 2027, though players will still be able to redownload any past purchases.
