= Qəribli, Tovuz =

Qəribli
- Municipality
- Location within Azerbaijan
- Coordinates: 40°41′33″N 45°39′27″E
- Country: Azerbaijan
- Rayon: Tovuz

Population
  - Total: 2,121
- Time zone: UTC+4 (AZT)
  - Summer (DST): UTC+5 (AZT)

Qəribli (also, Garibli, Garibly, and Gyaribli) is a village and municipality in the Tovuz Rayon of Azerbaijan. It has a population of 2,121. The municipality consists of the villages of Qəribli, Bala Şamlıq, Böyük Şamlıq, Dəlləkli, Öskən, and Hətəmlər.
