= Shuhei Yoshida =

Japanese businessman (born 1964)

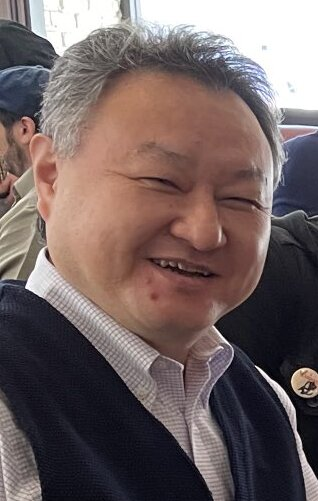
- Yoshida in 2022
- Born: February 11, 1964 (age 62); Kyoto, Japan
- Other name: gameape2001, yosp
- Education: Kyoto University; University of California, Los Angeles
- Occupation: Businessman
- Employer: Sony Interactive Entertainment (1993–2025)

Shuhei Yoshida (吉田 修平, Yoshida Shuhei; born February 11, 1964) is a Japanese businessman and gaming industry veteran. He was the President of SIE Worldwide Studios for Sony Interactive Entertainment (SIE) from 2008 to 2019, and was the head of PlayStation Indies from 2019 until his retirement from the company in 2025. Yoshida has been a key member of the PlayStation brand since its original concept, having been part of the company since 1993.

In 2023, he received the BAFTA Fellowship at the 19th British Academy Games Awards for his work in the gaming industry.

== Early life and education ==
Yoshida was born and raised in Kyoto, and attended Kyoto University, where he graduated with a Bachelor of Science degree in economics. He later earned his MBA degree at University of California, Los Angeles (UCLA) in 1993.

== Sony Interactive Entertainment ==
Yoshida joined Sony in 1986 as part of the corporate strategy group, with a role coordinating their PC business. He was one of the initial members of the PlayStation project in February 1993, and the first non-engineer team member. He acted as the lead account executive at Sony Computer Entertainment Inc.'s third party licensing program.

From the mid-1990s until 2000, Yoshida worked primarily as a producer on PlayStation titles, including Gran Turismo, Ape Escape, and The Legend of Dragoon among others. In April 2000, he became the Vice President at Sony Computer Entertainment America. In February 2007, he became Senior Vice President at SCE Worldwide Studios USA, and one year later in May 2008, he would be elevated to President of SCE Worldwide Studios.

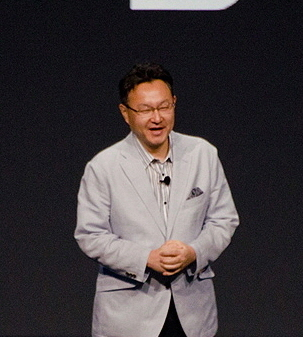
Yoshida at E3 2013

In November 2013 Yoshida appeared in the official PlayStation 4 unboxing video.

On November 7, 2019, Sony announced that Yoshida had stepped down as President of SIE Worldwide Studios amid a company reshuffle to become head of a newly formed initiative that will focus on nurturing external independent creators. The new initiative, which would later become PlayStation Indies focused on supporting external developers that are creating 'new and unexpected' experiences for the gaming industry. He was replaced by Hermen Hulst, the former studio head of Guerrilla Games.

Yoshida retired from SIE on January 15, 2025, after spending more than thirty years with the company. He would reveal in an interview later that year that Jim Ryan, then CEO of Sony Interactive Entertainment, gave him a choice in 2019 to work with indie games or leave Sony. In April 2026, Yoshida went further stating that he was "fired" from his role leading first party development for saying no to "ridiculous" requests from Jim Ryan. Yoshida did not specify the exact nature of the requests.

In his time at Sony, Yoshida was active on Twitter, particularly in promoting indie games. Yoshida appears as a playable character in Super Time Force Ultra, able to fire tweets and heart emoticons from his in-game smartphone.

== Selected ludography ==
Year	Game title	Role
1996	Crash Bandicoot	Producer
1997	Crash Bandicoot 2: Cortex Strikes Back	Producer
1997	Gran Turismo	Executive Producer
1998	Spyro the Dragon	Producer
1998	Crash Bandicoot: Warped	Executive Producer
1999	Ape Escape	Executive Producer
1999	CTR: Crash Team Racing	Executive Producer
1999	Spyro 2: Ripto's Rage!	Executive Producer
1999	The Legend of Dragoon	Producer
2000	FantaVision	Executive Producer
