= Flytenow =

US-based aviation flight sharing company formerly operating

- Type: Private
- Industry: Flight sharing
- Founded: 2013
- Founder: Matt Voska, Alan Guichard, Aakash Patel, and Andrew Mass
- Defunct: December 2015
- Headquarters: Boston, United States

Flytenow was a United States-based general aviation flight sharing company. The company developed a web platform for connecting travelers with licensed pilots conducting non-commercial flights, allowing the cost of the flight to be shared pro-rata.

The company ceased operations in December 2015, following a ruling by the Federal Aviation Administration (FAA) that the practice of offering flight sharing to the general public is a commercial carrier activity requiring certain certification, and an unsuccessful appeal by Flytenow to the Supreme Court of the United States.

== History ==
Flytenow, a flight-sharing service, was founded in 2013 by two pilots, Matt Voska and Alan Guichard in Boston, Massachusetts.

Flytenow's business model sought to extend an FAA-allowed practice among pilots – sharing expenses of a flight with personally-known passengers to make flights on small aircraft more cost-effective – to the more general public via the recent developments of the internet and sharing-based business models. Under established FAA rules, pilots and passengers may each pay an equal share of flight operating costs, such as gasoline, oil, airport fees, and other related expenses so long as they are traveling "for a common purpose". This type of compensation for flights is an allowed exception to commercial flight classification.

The company aimed to build a database of licensed pilots offering their personal flights on non-commercial aircraft to the general public. Notably, as pilots did not earn money via Flytenow, the primary purpose was to share flight expenses, pro-rata, for pre-planned flights.

Travelers could search for select flights between destinations that were being offered by pilots on the service. Flytenow provided travelers with information on each flight and its pilot including their license type, experience, and past flight ratings. This would allow the traveler to fly on small private planes for the shared cost and would allow participating pilots the ability to defray some flight expenses. Flytenow charged a connection fee to travelers for each flight.

On February 12, 2014, Flytenow submitted an official FAA Chief Counsel request for legal interpretation of its services.

== FAA ruling ==
The FAA ruled that pilots offering their planned flights online and receiving pro rata compensation were classed as a "common carrier".

Although common carriage is not strictly or precisely defined by regulation, FAA Advisory Circular No. 120-12A describes elements characterizing common carriage as "(1) a holding out of a willingness to (2) transport persons or property (3) from place to place (4) for compensation or hire."

This ruling meant that pilots offering flights through Flytenow would be subject to regulations akin to commercial airlines requiring heightened safety requirements, U.S. Department of Transportation Economic Authority approval, and other more stringent requirements.

== Legal appeals ==
Flytenow, with the help of The Goldwater Institute, a conservative policy think tank, challenged the FAA ruling to the U.S. Circuit Court of Appeals - D.C. Circuit. Flytenow argued among other things that sharing expenses did not constitute compensation within the meaning of "common carriage" because long standing case law defines compensation as an "enterprise for profit". Flytenow asserted that receiving pro rata shared expenses did not amount to an enterprise for profit and therefore pilots should not be classed as a common carrier.

On December 18, 2015, the FAA ruling was upheld by the U.S. Circuit Court of Appeals - D.C. Circuit. The court ruled primarily on the question of whether Flytenow (and pilots) were "holding out", or advertising, to the general public and therefore engaging in activity similar to a commercial carrier. The court ruled that the FAA was correct in interpreting its rules that the enabling of internet-wide users to access the website and find flights was in fact "holding out" willingness to transport passengers generally. The court also ruled on other arguments of Flytenow, including that the FAA's decisions were not infringements on the freedom of speech and equal protection. (The case did not significantly turn on the raised argument / interpretation of compensation converting an enterprise into a for-profit venture, as the court acknowledged that the sharing of flight costs is an allowed exception to commercial flight classification, even if it is called compensation.)

Flytenow appealed the Circuit Court's ruling to the U.S. Supreme Court. On January 9, 2017, the Supreme Court declined to hear Flytenow's case.

== Outcome ==
Flytenow ceased operations in December 2015, along with other flight sharing companies which had already ceased, such as AirPooler and PilotShareTheRide.com.

== See also ==
- Flight sharing
