= Hətəmlər, Tovuz =

Hətəmlər
- Location within Azerbaijan
- Coordinates: 40°43′18″N 45°39′22″E
- Country: Azerbaijan
- Rayon: Tovuz
- Municipality: Qəribli
- Time zone: UTC+4 (AZT)
  - Summer (DST): UTC+5 (AZT)

Hətəmlər (also, Khatamalar and Khatamlar) is a village in the Tovuz Rayon of Azerbaijan. The village forms part of the municipality of Qəribli.
