= MotorStorm: Pacific Rift =

2008 video game

- Developer: Evolution Studios
- Publisher: Sony Computer Entertainment
- Series: MotorStorm
- Platform: PlayStation 3
- Release: NA: 28 October 2008; EU: 7 November 2008; AU: 13 November 2008
- Genre: Racing
- Modes: Single-player, multiplayer

MotorStorm: Pacific Rift is a 2008 racing video game developed by Evolution Studios and published by Sony Computer Entertainment for the PlayStation 3. It is the second installment in the MotorStorm series and the sequel to MotorStorm. The game was announced by Sony following their acquisition of Evolution Studios and was released on 28 October 2008 in North America. It sold over one million units as of December 2008. In October 2012, the game's online servers were permanently shut down.

MotorStorm: 3D Rift is a 3D mini re-release of Pacific Rift, featuring 10 tracks and a selection of off-road vehicles from Pacific Rift. It is single-player only and contains no trophies. It was released on the PlayStation Network on 24 August 2010.

== Gameplay ==
The game moves away from the desert environments of the original title and is set on "a lush island environment, full of interactive vegetation." It also includes monster trucks and four-player split-screen capability. Monster trucks can drive over cars (except big rigs), break most vegetation, and destroy structures. Bikes have new abilities, allowing them to bunny hop and for the driver to duck. Custom music tracks using a player's own music stored on their PS3 hard drive are available, as are trophies (used to unlock additional drivers and vehicles). Camera angles for crashes are improved, as is vehicle damage. Players can select drivers from the Garage menu, eliminating the need to choose drivers based on the vehicle or the driver's gender. "Speed" events are introduced in the game, consisting of numerous checkpoints on each track that players must pass through to gain extra time before the timer runs out. Any class other than ATVs or bikes can ram vehicles to the left or right, while ATVs and bikes ram by having their drivers throw punches at other drivers.

=== Tracks ===
Screenshot from Motorstorm: Pacific Rift showing a Mudplugger

The 16 original tracks are set around volcanic mountainsides, beaches, jungles, caves, and a run-down sugar factory. Another new feature in MotorStorm: Pacific Rift is the presence of water in the form of rivers, pools, and waterfalls. Water can cool down a vehicle's engine, introducing new tactical possibilities; however, vehicles slow down when passing through deep water, and buoyancy comes into play for those that venture into water too deep for their type.

Two expansion packs were released in July 2009, adding a total of six new tracks. The "Speed" expansion adds three tracks, along with three new track variants and new paint jobs. The "Adrenaline" pack also adds three new tracks, as well as five new track variants, four new vehicles, and six new characters. Among the variants is one called "Volcanic," which features a red, partially burnt card design. Variations of the same tracks are reimagined with post-apocalyptic volcanic activity, such as lava bombs scattered throughout the race. Driving through a lava bomb instantly wrecks any vehicle. Smaller lava bombs can instantly raise the boost temperature to maximum, even if it was previously low. If the boost temperature is already high and the player drives through a small lava bomb, the vehicle may explode.

=== Vehicles ===
MotorStorm: Pacific Rift features all seven vehicle classes from the original game (bikes, ATVs, buggies, rally cars, racing trucks, mud pluggers, and big rigs) along with a new class, monster trucks. Fifty of the 51 vehicles from the original MotorStorm return in the new game, with the Patriot 85 rally car being the only omission. The game also includes an entirely new selection of vehicles, including those available through downloadable content packs such as Revenge Weekend and Devil's Weekend.

== Development ==
The first target render teaser trailer of the game was released in March 2008 and featured a pre-rendered cutscene showcasing destructible environments and realistic character modeling, along with the song "Tarantula" by Pendulum.

The "screenshot" feature allows players to take a picture during a race, which can then be exported to the PlayStation 3's XMB.

A patch for MotorStorm: Pacific Rift was mistakenly released in the European region in January 2009. At the same time, the official MotorStorm website was updated, stating that the patch had been released and detailing the fixes it contained. The patch was subsequently withdrawn from European servers, and the official website was reverted, claiming at the time that the patch would be released soon.

Sony later issued a statement on the MotorStorm website confirming that the patch had indeed been erroneously released and then withdrawn, and advised users who had installed it not to remove it, as the patch modified save game files.

In update version 1.02, new features were added to MotorStorm: Pacific Rift, known as "Microbadges" and "Signature Collections." With "Microbadges," players could display up to five badges during online races. Several badges were hidden, with no description of how to earn them. The second new feature, "Signature Collection," awarded players new skins for every vehicle that was also in the first MotorStorm game for every 10 "Microbadges" earned. When players achieved all the "Microbadges" and "Signature Collection," they could earn hidden rewards.

=== Demo ===
A demo version of the game was made available in Europe and North America in September 2008. In Europe, the demo was provided to randomly selected users. Access to the North American demo required users to purchase episode 4 of Qore. It became available to all users on the PlayStation Store in October.

The demo featured a single-player race and a two-player split-screen race on Rain God Spires. A total of eight vehicles were available in the demo: a bike, a monster truck, two buggies, two racing trucks (one of which was included in both modes), and two rally cars.

A new demo, called MotorStorm: Pacific Rift demo 2.0, was launched in February 2009. It featured a different track, Razorback, and a different buggy, and also allowed split-screen play. Another demo was released in June 2010 as part of a collection of several games.

=== PlayStation Home ===
With the version 1.03 patch released on 1 July 2009, users of PlayStation Home, the PlayStation 3's community-based service, could fully game launch MotorStorm: Pacific Rift. Game launching is a feature that lets users set up a multiplayer game in Home and then launch directly into the game. At E3 2007, MotorStorm was announced as one of the games to include game launching but did not implement it at the time.

In August 2009, a themed MotorStorm: Pacific Rift game space was released for the European and North American versions of PlayStation Home. This space, called the "MotorStorm Sphere," was only available for a limited time. It was removed in October and relaunched later that year. Its main feature was the MotorStorm Jukebox, which contained thirteen songs for users to choose from. The space also featured a video screen advertising the game, as well as seating. In the European version, when users first accessed the space, they received MotorStorm Festival Jeans for their avatar. During its short availability, the space was used as a game launching hub for players to meet up and launch MotorStorm: Pacific Rift. Additionally, MotorStorm-themed biker suits were released for purchase in Home's shopping complex.

In December 2009, a MotorStorm: Pacific Rift-themed personal apartment was released for the European and North American versions of Home. This apartment, called the "MotorStorm: Pacific Rift camp," could be purchased from the Home Estates store in Home's shopping complex.

== Soundtrack ==
The game features 46 licensed music tracks, nine of which are exclusive to the game. This contrasts with the original game, which had 21 music tracks. Notable artists featured on the MotorStorm: Pacific Rift soundtrack include Megadeth, Nirvana, Queens of the Stone Age, David Bowie, Death from Above 1979, Pendulum, Clutch, Fatboy Slim, Hervé, Qemists, and Slipknot, as well as unsigned bands such as March and The Planets. The song used in the game's TV trailer is by Gogol Bordello. Users can also play custom soundtracks via the PlayStation 3's XMB.

== Reception ==
Reception

Aggregate score
Aggregator	Score
Metacritic	82/100

Review scores
Publication	Score
Edge	7/10
Eurogamer	8/10
Famitsu	33/40
Game Informer	7.25/10
GameDaily	8/10
GamePro	4.5/5
GameRevolution	B−
GameSpot	8/10
GameSpy	4/5
GameTrailers	8.6/10
Giant Bomb	4/5
Hardcore Gamer	4/5
IGN	(AU) 8.9/10 (UK) 8.8/10 (US) 8.3/10
PlayStation: The Official Magazine	3/5

The game received "favorable" reviews according to the review aggregation website Metacritic. In Japan, where the game was ported for release under the name MotorStorm 2 (モーターストーム2, MōtōSutōmu 2) on November 20, 2008, Famitsu gave it scores of two eights, one nine, and one eight for a total of 33 out of 40.

IGN's U.S. review praised the game's strong graphical component and called it "a worthy follow-up to one of the PS3's early must-have titles". GameSpot praised the number of well-designed tracks in the game as well as its multiplayer element both online and offline, though it criticized the inconsistent handling of the vehicles. 1Up.com gave it an A−, praising the level of improvement the game achieved compared to the original, notably the game's new "awe-inspiring" landscape and the improved aggressive A.I. competitors; it also praised the game's seamless transitions through various in-game environments such as jungles and beaches rather than just the monotonous desert of the first game. GameZone gave it 8.3 out of 10, calling it "entertaining and a visual treat. The development team did a good job building on the original title, tweaking what needed to be tweaked and leaving the core mechanics intact. If you are looking for a solid, off-road racer, this is a good bet."

During the Academy of Interactive Arts & Sciences' 12th Annual Interactive Achievement Awards, the game was nominated for the "Outstanding Achievement in Soundtrack" and "Racing Game of the Year" awards, both of which went to Rock Band 2 and Burnout Paradise, respectively.
