= Little Deviants =

2011 video game

- European cover art
- Developer: Bigbig Studios
- Publisher: Sony Computer Entertainment
- Platform: PlayStation Vita
- Release: JP: 17 December 2011; NA: 15 February 2012; EU: 22 February 2012; AU: 23 February 2012
- Genre: Various
- Modes: Single-player, multiplayer

Little Deviants, known in Japan as Sawari Makuru! (サワリ･マ･ク〜ル！), is a minigame compilation video game developed by Bigbig Studios and published by Sony Computer Entertainment for the PlayStation Vita. It was released on 17 December 2011 in Japan, 15 February 2012 in North America, 22 February 2012 in Europe, and 23 February 2012 in Australia as a launch title for the PlayStation Vita.

Little Deviants is composed of 30 minigames that make use of the Vita's front multitouch touchscreen, rear multitouch touchpad, Sixaxis motion controls, and augmented reality capabilities, along with some traditional controls, only using the L and R trigger buttons of the console. It was Bigbig's last game as Sony announced the studio's closure in January 2012.

== Gameplay ==
The goal of Little Deviants is to play through the game's 30 minigames in order to rebuild the Little Deviants' spaceship, which was destroyed by the Botz and crash-landed on the Whomans' planet.

The game's minigames take advantage of the PlayStation Vita's front touchscreen, rear touchpad, SIXAXIS motion controls, rear camera, microphone, and augmented reality capabilities.

== Reception ==
Reception

Aggregate score
Aggregator	Score
Metacritic	57/100

Review scores
Publication	Score
The A.V. Club	C−
Destructoid	5/10
Eurogamer	7/10
Game Informer	6/10
GameRevolution	4/10
GameSpot	6/10
GameTrailers	6.3/10
IGN	6/10
Joystiq	2/5
Pocket Gamer	3/5
PlayStation: The Official Magazine	6/10
Push Square	6/10
The Guardian	2/5
VentureBeat	40/100
Digital Spy	2/5
Metro	5/10

Little Deviants received "mixed or average" reviews, according to the review aggregation website Metacritic. IGN said, "It's a decent piece of (admittedly overpriced) software. And its pretty, vivid graphics and surprisingly catchy old-school inspired soundtrack certainly please aesthetically. But a strong hook doesn't exist." Edge gave it five out of ten, saying, "Little Deviants' real problem is simple: it's not moreish, and its challenges fail to reveal the kinds of nuance on the second and third tries that will have you refining strategies and aiming to better scores. Without that incentive to return, you're unlikely to." EGMNow gave it four out of ten, saying, "What should've been a fun collection of minigames showing off the Vita's capabilities ended up a completely unappealing tech demo. There isn't enough game here to justify the price."
