= Hətəmlər, Lachin =

Hətəmlər
- Location within Azerbaijan Location within East Zangezur Economic Region
- Coordinates: 39°49′43″N 46°20′50″E
- Country: Azerbaijan
- District: Lachin
- Time zone: UTC+4 (AZT)
  - Summer (DST): UTC+5 (AZT)

Hətəmlər (Hatamlar) is a village in the Lachin District of Azerbaijan.
