= Pursuit Force =

2005 video game

- European cover art
- Developer: Bigbig Studios
- Publisher: Sony Computer Entertainment
- Platform: PlayStation Portable
- Release: AU: 10 November 2005; EU: 18 November 2005; NA: 7 March 2006
- Genres: Vehicular combat, third-person shooter
- Mode: Single-player

Pursuit Force is a 2005 vehicular combat and third-person shooter video game developed by Bigbig Studios and published by Sony Computer Entertainment for the PlayStation Portable. The game places the player in the role of a police agent who is a member of the titular elite law enforcement agency that specialises in direct armed encounters with adversaries, whether it be on foot or on the hood of a speeding car. The player has to try to seize cars and motorbikes while engaging in high-speed chases and gun battles against heavily armed gangs.

Pursuit Force was released in the PAL region in November 2005 and in North America in March 2006. The game received positive reviews from critics. A sequel, Pursuit Force: Extreme Justice, was released for the PlayStation Portable in 2007. In May 2023, the original Pursuit Force was released for PlayStation 4 and PlayStation 5 as part of the Classics Catalogue.

== Gameplay ==
There are a total of 30 missions, six per gang, involving fighting enemies on foot, in a speedboat and a car/motorcycle chases, or in a helicopter while manning a minigun. The player character can leap into enemy vehicles and commandeer them after shooting their occupants. The player can earn different ranks which unlock different content while completing missions will unlock new ranks which will unlock new gang missions and different abilities to help make the game easier, such as regenerating health.

The game also includes a race mode with several different courses and scenarios and a time trial mode, setting the player across all the games' tracks. These two modes are completely independent of each other and will not help nor hinder the gameplay of the other game modes. There is also a wide variety of unlockable content such as pictures and videos to access. The amount of content to unlock, however, is completely dependent on the scores in the career mode.

== Plot ==
The Pursuit Force has been organised to destroy the threat posed by gangs responsible for many vehicle-related crime sprees across Capital State and to eliminate their leaders:

- Capelli Family: One of the two gangs that are initially available at the start of the game, the Capellis are Capital State's most powerful Mafia family headed up by Don Capelli, and are said to be the state's oldest gang. The other significant member of the Capelli Family is their best marksman Stefano De Tomaso, also known as "Deadeye".
- Warlords: The second of the two gangs available at the start of the game, the Warlords are a group of mercenaries and rogue soldiers who feel that they were betrayed by the military. They focus primarily on hijacking military hardware and are led by "The General", with the other significant member of the gang being Lieutenant Davies.
- Convicts: The Convicts are a group of psychotic prison escapees who have broken out of prison to cause as much chaos as they can around Capital State and are about to flee the city so they can wreak havoc on a much larger scale. Their leader is a gigantic criminal known only as "Hard Balls", while the other significant member of the Convicts is an insane pyromaniac named Billy Wilde.
- Vixens: The Vixens are an all-female group of professional thieves with a high-tech arsenal whose crimes are based around high-profile heists and grand thefts, from priceless artifacts to luxury speedboats. The major members of the Vixens are their leader "Whiplash" and her second-in-command and lover "The Fox".
- Killer 66: The Killer 66 are a Yakuza gang based in Capital State, and the most powerful of all five gangs in the game, focusing primarily on vehicle smuggling and illegal drug trade. They are led by "Monster" Toshima; the other significant member of the gang being his second-in-command Sudeko Arakawa.

== Reception ==
Reception

Aggregate score
Aggregator	Score
Metacritic	75/100

Review scores
Publication	Score
Computer Games Magazine	4/5
Electronic Gaming Monthly	4.67/10 (Note: Three critics of Electronic Gaming Monthly gave the game each a score of 3.5/10, 4/10, and 6.5/10.)
Eurogamer	6/10
Famitsu	30/40
Game Informer	6.25/10
GameRevolution	C+
GameSpot	8/10
GameSpy	3.5/5
GameTrailers	7.6/10
Hardcore Gamer	3.25/5
IGN	8.4/10
Official U.S. PlayStation Magazine	3/5
Pocket Gamer	3.5/5
X-Play	3/5
Detroit Free Press	4/4
The Times	5/5

The game received "generally favorable reviews" according to the review aggregation website Metacritic. In Japan, where the game was ported and published by Spike on 2 March 2006, Famitsu gave it a score of two eights and two sevens for a total of 30 out of 40. Rice Burner of GamePro said, "If rampant explosions and car chases float your boat and you can forgive the list of obvious short comings [sic] of Pursuit Force, then this game can be an enjoyable ride and a minor trip down video gaming nostalgic lane." (Note: GamePro gave the game two 4/5 scores for graphics and sound, and two 3.5/5 scores for control and fun factor.)

Detroit Free Press gave it a score of all four stars and said that the game was "nearly perfect with its graphics that often look close to cinematic scenes and a whole host of strategies for nailing the bad guys." The Times similarly gave it all five stars and said, "Even by the high standards already set, Pursuit Force is an astonishing title... The best PSP title yet." However, The New York Times gave it an average review and said, "Apparently the designers were afraid the game might just be too much fun, so they compensated by making the missions brutally, mind-numbingly difficult." The Sydney Morning Herald gave it a score of three out of five, saying, "Streamlined controls make performing outrageous stunts easy. But car handling is overly rigid making tight bends difficult to negotiate."

GameZone gave it 8.6 out of 10, calling it "a heck of a good time to play; hard, but fun." However, Edge gave it seven out of ten, saying that the game "delivers on its promise of realizing pursuit scenarios in a fast-paced and energetic manner – it's a pleasing experience, but not exceptional."

Despite its innovative gameplay, Pursuit Force was criticized for its punishing difficulty. In response, the developer reevaluated the gameplay and made sure the sequel was more playable.
