= Qəribli, Agdash =

Qəribli
- Municipality
- Location within Azerbaijan
- Coordinates: 40°37′19″N 47°17′18″E
- Country: Azerbaijan
- Rayon: Agdash

Population
  - Total: 969
- Time zone: UTC+4 (AZT)
  - Summer (DST): UTC+5 (AZT)

Qəribli (also, Garibli) is a village and municipality in the Agdash Rayon of Azerbaijan. It has a population of 969.
