= Wingly (company) =

Online flightsharing platform based in France

- Type: Privately held company
- Industry: Transportation, Air transport
- Founded: June 2015
- Founders: Emeric de Waziers; Bertrand Joab-Cornu; Lars Klein
- Headquarters: Levallois-Perret, France
- Area served: Worldwide, predominantly UK, France and Germany
- Products: Mobile app, website
- Services: Flightsharing; Technology Company; Vehicle for hire
- Website: Official website

Wingly is an international company based in Paris, France. Running an online flightsharing platform, they connect passengers and local private pilots. Private pilots are able to offer seats on their flights departing from local aerodromes. The website is part of the sharing economy. When offering a flight, the pilot shares the operational expenses with their passengers.

This service is often compared to Uber, Airbnb or Blablacar. All flights are insured by Allianz.

Pilots are not allowed to make a profit, but they can split the direct costs of the flight equally with the passengers.
