= Öskən =

- Location within Azerbaijan
- Coordinates: 40°42′37″N 45°38′57″E
- Country: Azerbaijan
- Rayon: Tovuz
- Municipality: Qəribli
- Time zone: UTC+4 (AZT)
  - Summer (DST): UTC+5 (AZT)

Öskən (also, Öksən, Osgyan, and Oskyan) is a village in the Tovuz Rayon of Azerbaijan. The village forms part of the municipality of Qəribli.
