= Voskan =

Voskan (Armenian: Ոսկան), transliterated Vosgan in Western Armenian, is an Armenian masculine given name. It is derived from Armenian ոսկի (voski, "gold").

Notable people with the name include:

- Yervant Voskan (1855–1914), Ottoman Armenian sculptor
- Voskan Yerevantsi (1614–1674), early Armenian publisher
- Voskan Martikian (1867–1947), Ottoman Armenian politician and writer
