= The Legend of Dragoon =

1999 video game

- North American box art featuring three of the protagonists: Dart, Shana, and Rose
- Developer: Sony Computer Entertainment Japan
- Publisher: Sony Computer Entertainment
- Director: Yasuyuki Hasebe
- Producer: Shuhei Yoshida
- Designer: Yasuyuki Hasebe
- Programmer: Satoshi Mamuro
- Artists: Kenichi Iwata; Tatsuya Nakamura
- Writers: Takehiro Kaminagayoshi; Yasuyuki Hasebe
- Composers: Dennis Martin; Takeo Miratsu
- Platform: PlayStation
- Release: JP: December 2, 1999; NA: June 13, 2000; EU: January 19, 2001
- Genre: Role-playing
- Mode: Single-player

The Legend of Dragoon (Note: Rejendo Obu Doragūn (レジェンド・オブ・ドラグーン)) is a role-playing video game developed and published by Sony Computer Entertainment for the PlayStation. It was released in December 1999 in Japan, June 2000 in North America, and January 2001 in Europe. Set in a high fantasy fictional world called Endiness, the game follows a group of warriors led by the protagonist, Dart, as they attempt to stop the destruction of the world. The player controls a party of three-dimensional (3D) character models through pre-rendered, linear environments. Combat uses a combination of turn-based mechanics and real-time commands. The game includes a quick time event called "addition" during each attack, requiring the player to press a button when prompted in order to continue inflicting damage.

The game had a development budget of over $16 million, a notably high figure for the era. Production began in 1996 and spanned three years, involving a team of more than one hundred people. Reviewers differed in their assessment of the game, although many unfavourably compared it to the Final Fantasy series. The game sold more than one million copies worldwide, with most sales coming from North America. An album of the game's soundtrack was released in 2000, as well as a novel and manga inspired by the game.

== Gameplay ==
Dart attacks an enemy and triggers the "addition" quick time event. To execute an additional attack the player must press X when the two squares converge, as indicated by the icon in the bottom-right.

The Legend of Dragoon is a role-playing game (RPG) focused on fantasy elements. It features three modes of play: the area map, the field, and the battle screen. In the first mode, players explore the world of The Legend of Dragoon by following predetermined routes on a linear 3D map. At the end of each route are towns and dungeons for the player to explore. The player can access new routes and areas as the plot progresses. In the field mode, the player navigates fully scaled versions of the locations represented on the area map, superimposed on pre-rendered backgrounds. The player can explore the environment, interact with characters and advance the story. At important story moments, the game will explain plot elements using CGI clips.

At random intervals on the area map and in field mode in some locations, and at specific moments in the story, the game will enter the battle screen. A maximum of three characters are used in each battle. The player's opponents include monsters and characters introduced in the plot. On a party member's turn, the player chooses a command for their character to take such as attacking with a weapon, guarding to recover health, using items, or running away. When the "attack" option is selected, a quick time event mechanic called "addition" is activated. Two blue squares appear on the screen and start to converge. If the player presses a button when the squares overlap the character will continue the addition and do more damage. Characters gain access to multiple additions over the course of the game, which have longer chains and deal more damage. The longer additions, however, allow enemies the opportunity to counter and the player needs to press a different button to continue their attack. A player can also select a magic attack item where the player can increase the strength of the attack by repeatedly pressing a button.

During the game's story, each playable character will obtain a Dragoon Spirit, giving them the ability to transform into "Dragoon form" while in combat. Dragoon form changes the character's appearance, giving them wings and making them float in the air. The character can only become a Dragoon during a battle if they have obtained spirit points, which are received when physically attacking an enemy while not in Dragoon form. In Dragoon form, the character receives a boost to their damage and damage resistance, and their commands of attack, guard, items, and run are replaced with Dragoon Attack and Dragoon Magic. If Dragoon Attack is selected, the player enters a new quick time event to extend the number of attacks they execute. A circle appears with a line that moves clockwise and when the line reaches the top of the circle, the player must press X to execute an additional attack. Dragoon Magic allows the player to execute a powerful offensive or defensive spell. The Dragoon form is only usable for a limited number of turns and must recharge to be used again.

When not in battle, the player can use the menu screen. This screen is used to review each character's status and statistics, use items and abilities, save the game (when on the world map or at a save point), and select an addition attack for use in battle.

== Plot ==
=== Setting and characters ===
The Legend of Dragoon takes place on a world referred to in-game as "Endiness". Its aesthetic resembles the Middle Ages with fantasy elements such as magic and dragons. The world contains a variety of species including Humans, Dragons and Winglies. Humans live as farmers while Dragons look like winged creatures and possess Dragon Spirits. Winglies are an aggressive species who can fly; 11,000 years before the start of the game they enslaved humans. After obtaining the help of Dragons, Humans became Dragoons to defeat the Winglies and liberate themselves. At the time of the game's events, most humans on Endiness live in relative peace.

There are nine playable protagonists in the game. The main protagonist is Dart, a warrior who is searching for the Black Monster. Shana is Dart's childhood friend and love interest. Rose is a warrior who teaches Dart how to fight as a Dragoon. Albert is the king of Basil, a duchy within the game, and Lavitz is one of his knights. Meru is a Wingly dancer and Kongol is a Giganto, a giant-like human, and the last of his species alive in the game's world. Haschel is an elderly martial artist searching for his daughter and Miranda is a headstrong retainer of Queen Theresa. Through different story events, each playable character gains the ability to transform into a Dragoon, a tool used to gain additional abilities and a greater power to defeat enemies. Lloyd, a Wingly swordsman is the central antagonist. Other notable antagonists are Emperor Doel, Ruler of the southern part of Serdio and Albert's uncle, a Wingly bandit Lenus and Melbu Frahma, former ruler of the Winglies and all of Endiness.

=== Story ===
Dart has been travelling the world in search of the Black Monster, an entity that killed his parents when he was a child. He is travelling to his home when he is attacked by a dragon. He is saved by Rose, who informs Dart that an army has attacked his home. As he arrives he discovers that the town has been destroyed and Shana has been taken to a prison. He decides to postpone his quest to find the Black Monster to save Shana.

After rescuing Shana with the help of Lavitz, King Albert sends the party to defend the fort-city of Hoax. During a surprise attack, Rose helps Dart gain the ability to transform into a Dragoon, revealing that she can also transform into a Dragoon. Although the fort is safe, the party learns that a man named Lloyd has kidnapped King Albert and taken the Moon Gem from him, an ancient artifact held by the Royal Family. The king is rescued, but Lloyd kills Lavitz and escapes with the Moon Gem. The party discovers that Lloyd is gathering similar artifacts held by royalty across the continent and decides to pursue and stop Lloyd. The party is unable to stop him from obtaining all three of the artifacts, but Lloyd offers to bring them to the person directing his actions, Emperor Diaz.

Diaz reveals that during the Wingly reign 11,000 years ago a creature called the Virage Embryo, also known as the God of Destruction, came to the world to end all other life. Before it could be born, the Winglies used their magic to separate its body from its soul and cast the body into the sky, where it became the Moon That Never Sets. They sealed the moon with magical Signets placed in each of the Wingly cities to prevent the soul and body from reuniting. The soul of the God of Destruction was originally placed inside the Crystal Sphere, which was worn by the Wingly ruler Melbu Frahma to increase his power. The Crystal Sphere was shattered when Dragoons attacked the Wingly capital of Kadessa.

The soul of the God of Destruction wanders Endiness and every one hundred and eight years possesses a human child in an attempt to return to its body. Rose, revealed to be immortal and the Black Monster that Dart has been pursuing, has killed each possessed human to prevent the God of Destruction's soul and body from merging. The body can be summoned if the Signets are destroyed, which is done using the immense magical power contained within the artifacts that Lloyd gathered. In the present day, the human that is the soul of the God of Destruction is Shana. Emperor Diaz reveals himself as Zieg Feld, Dart's father and leader of the Dragoons 10,000 years ago. Frahma cast a spell that both petrified Zieg and kept his own spirit alive within Zieg's body.

Zieg – possessed by Frahma – is given the Signet Spheres by Lloyd. He takes Shana and destroys the remaining Signet Spheres that seal the Moon That Never Sets, causing it to fall from the sky. The party pursues Frahma to save Shana and stop the destruction of the world. Frahma carries Shana to the body of the God of Destruction so that the body will sense the presence of its soul and prepare to restore itself. Instead, Frahma unites with the body himself, taking the form and power of the God of Destruction. Zieg is released from Melbu Frahma's possession; Zieg and Rose sacrifice themselves to destroy Frahma. The surviving party members return to various points on the continent and live separate lives.

=== Analysis ===
The death of Lavitz is cited as an example of ludonarrative dissonance, as this event serves a narrative purpose but little gameplay consequences. Since Albert replaces Lavitz's role in the party, the gameplay is unchanged after this event. The plot mechanic of a character dying, but having their abilities inherited by another playable character, was used in other role-playing games created at the same time. This includes Final Fantasy V, where Krile inherits Galuf's abilities after the latter's death.

== Development ==
Sony Computer Entertainment was inspired by the financial success of the Final Fantasy series to create an RPG video game. The Legend of Dragoon was developed by a group within Sony Computer Entertainment Japan. Shuhei Yoshida served as producer; it was both one of the last and largest projects he worked on in his first tenure at Sony. The game was directed and designed by Yasuyuki Hasebe, who also created the story outline. Hasebe was a battle designer for Super Mario RPG, but afterwards was hired by Sony to develop a new game for their studio. When Hasebe stated he wanted to create a new RPG, Yoshida put together a development team to support Hasebe's desire.

Kenichi Iwata was the game's art director and designer of the Dragoon armor, working on character designs alongside Tatsuya Nakamura. The game's monsters were designed by Itsuo Itoh, and the dragons were created by Hirohiko Iyoku. The script was written and supervised by Takehiro Kaminagayoshi. Polyphony Digital, which was spun off from the studio a year prior, assisted in creating the game's CGI cutscenes.

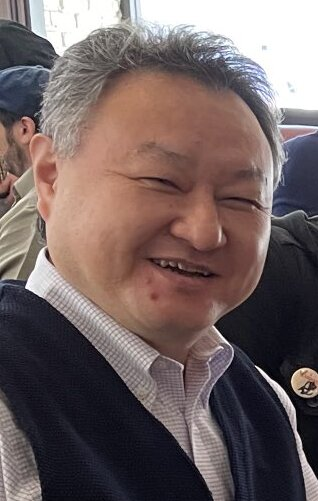
Shuhei Yoshida (pictured here in 2022) was the producer of The Legend of Dragoon.

Production of the game lasted three years. When it started development in 1996, the company was also developing Ape Escape and conceptualizing Ico, so The Legend of Dragoon began with a small team. The production team grew to over 100 staff members and had a budget of $16 million, both considered large for a PlayStation game. Many members of the development team were recent graduates of college or video game schools. The addition battle system was designed to make players feel like they were actively participating in a battle rather than selecting commands and waiting for actions to finish. The team's strive for realism resulted in magic – a common character ability in RPGs – only being incorporated into the Dragoon state or through items with equivalent effects.

There were originally no plans for CGI movies as the character models were polygon-based and there would be a disconnect between real-time and CGI graphics. The development team acquiesced to use CGI movies for key events because they looked impressive and they wanted to showcase the characters flying through the air. It was challenging for the developers to create smoke because it was their first time attempting this effect. The game's real-time lighting was designed to emulate the lighting used in CGI cutscenes. The development team limited the lighting's brightness and used it to draw attention to important elements on the map. The number of CGI movies and pre-rendered backgrounds meant that the game had to be spread across four CDs.

According to Yoshida, a dedicated team of ten artists worked on the game's concept art. The team chose the character's names by writing down 100 names and then choosing the names they liked best and attaching them to the characters who fit the proposed name. Iwata was chosen to design the main characters after other designers proposed an anime aesthetic, which was rejected. Iwata originally only designed Dart and Rose, with Rose's hair bright green. As the setting shifted towards a more realistic tone, elements such as Rose's green hair were removed. The characters were given key colors so players could easily distinguish them from each other and each color matches a character's personality.

=== Music ===
The music of The Legend of Dragoon was co-composed by Dennis Martin and Takeo Miratsu. Martin was both the soundtrack programmer and pianist. The soundtrack featured contributions from guitarist Chuei Yoshikawa, bass work by Jonathan Maron (Groove Collective), percussion from Ray Grappone (Hipbone Records), and saxophone by Jay Rodriguez (also of Groove Collective). The synthesizer operator was Tetsuo Yamazaki. The music recording sessions were split between the Tokyo-based SEDIC and the Sound On Sound studio in New York. Mixing was also done at Sound On Sound. The Legend of Dragoon was Martin's first work for a video game; he was chosen because Sony wanted a different musical style to other RPGs at the time. Martin was supposed to compose the game's music himself, but the game's 4 CD-length made this impractical and the Japanese staff hired Miratsu to create additional music. Martin and Miratsu did not meet each other while working on the game, although Martin stated that having a native Japanese composer with a different style broadened the soundtrack's variety.

Martin struggled to create music during the early stages of development. He used the game's artwork and storyboards for inspiration when creating the tracks. One of the two demo discs Martin submitted became the music for the opening CGI cutscene. The game's main theme, "If You Still Believe", was performed by Elsa Raven. The song was composed, written and produced by Martin. The recording of the theme song was split between Tokyo and New York.

== Release ==
The Legend of Dragoon was announced in September 1999 after cutscenes from the game were shown at that year's SIGGRAPH event. Later that year it was among the games displayed at Tokyo Game Show. The game released in Japan on December 2, 1999.

A North American release was confirmed by Sony in January 2000 and released on June 13. Yoshida supervised the North American release following his move to Sony's North American branch. The gameplay was adjusted to become less difficult after feedback from Japanese players, and Yoshida called the North American release the "complete" version. The game was released in Europe on January 19, 2001.

The game was re-released on the PlayStation Network on December 22, 2010, in Japan and May 1, 2012, in North America. In a retrospective article about the series, Yoshida stated that a sequel was in pre-production after Yoshida left Japan, but was cancelled for unknown reasons. On February 21, 2023, The Legend of Dragoon was released digitally on PlayStation 4 and PlayStation 5 under the Classics Catalogue. This version included additional features such as up-rendering, rewind, quick saves, and custom video filters.

== Reception ==
Reception

Aggregate score
Aggregator	Score
Metacritic	74/100

Review scores
Publication	Score
Famitsu	31/40
GamePro	5/5
GameSpot	6.4/10
HobbyConsolas	90/100
IGN	7/10
Jeuxvideo.com	15/20
Next Generation	4/5

The Legend of Dragoon was given a score of 74 out of 100 by review aggregation website Metacritic based on 12 reviews, indicating a "mixed or average" reception. The game was one of four nominees for the "Console Role-Playing" award at the 4th Annual Interactive Achievement Awards for the Academy of Interactive Arts & Sciences; it lost to Final Fantasy IX.

The game was frequently compared to entries in the Final Fantasy series, and reviewers often stated that The Legend of Dragoon did not meet the standards of the series. When comparing the game to other RPGs, reviewers called The Legend of Dragoon "highly generic" and "average". Ken Chu, in reviewing the Japanese version, said that it would be considered a good game if it was evaluated on its own merits, instead of in comparison to other video game titles. Neal Chandran of RPGFan wrote "The Legend of Dragoon is one of the most underrated RPGs in the PlayStation era".

The game's cinematics and graphics were praised by multiple reviews and cited as major drawing points for the game. The addition quick time events were criticised for requiring too much precision and slowing the pace of battle events. David Smith in his review for IGN deemed the titular element of Dragoon transformations inconsequential to the gameplay and criticised the frequency of the random encounters as excessive. The English translation of the game was criticised by reviewers for using unusual colloquialisms and phrasing unusual for native English speakers. When reviewing its re-release in 2012, Chandran said it was enjoyable once the reviewer was comfortable with its gameplay mechanics and changes from traditional RPG characteristics.

=== Sales ===
Upon its debut in Japan, The Legend of Dragoon reached second place in sales behind Pokémon Gold and Silver, selling over 160,000 units and becoming the best-selling new release that week. By 2007, the game had sold over 280,000 copies in Japan and 823,000 copies in North America. According to Yoshida, sales in the United States allowed the game to recoup its large budget. Years later, the game was released on the PlayStation Network and topped the PlayStation Classics sales charts, remaining in the top five for the next three months.

== Other media ==
An original soundtrack album for the game was released in Japan on January 21, 2000, by SPE Visual Works. RPGFan's Lucy Rzeminski called the album "a passable CD if you give it a chance to sink in", praising some tracks but finding most of the album lacking in both quality and variety. Chris Greening of Square Enix Music Online gave the album a score of 6/10 in 2010, saying that while innovative at the time, it had been superseded in quality by later soundtracks. He recommended that fans buy the soundtrack despite the album missing several tracks from the game. Both critics praised the main theme of "If You Still Believe" as a high-quality theme song. "If You Still Believe" was included in the compilation album Game Music Collection Sony Computer Entertainment Japan Best, published by King Records in 2005.

The series was twice adapted following its Japanese release; a novelization written by Hiranari Izuno and published by Famitsu Bunko in March 2000, and a short-lived manga created by Ataru Cagiva published in a tankōbon by Enterbrain in June the same year. Dart was also intended to be a downloadable content character for PlayStation All-Stars Battle Royale. He was featured as a collectable cameo bot in the video game Astro Bot.
