= The Reap =

1997 video game

- Developer: Housemarque
- Publisher: Take-Two Interactive
- Platform: Microsoft Windows
- Release: November 1997
- Genre: Shoot 'em up
- Modes: Single-player, multiplayer

The Reap is a 1997 video game developed by Housemarque and published by Take 2 Interactive for Microsoft Windows. It is a 3D arcade shoot 'em up title played in an isometric perspective. The player is a mercenary assisting aliens in an invasion of Earth. Upon release, The Reap received positive reviews, with praise directed to its visual presentation, although some critics felt visual effects could be overwhelming, and that the game had a high difficulty curve.

== Gameplay ==
Gameplay screenshot

The Reap is a 3D shoot 'em up game in which players control and shoot from a ship in isometric perspective as it flies diagonally across the screen. The premise of the game is that the player is a mercenary assisting a taskforce of invading aliens to exterminate Earth, an alien experiment gone awry, and must destroy human aircraft and vehicles such as attack helicopters, harriers, cars and tanks. Players navigate across fifteen levels set in four worlds: sea, ice, desert and the city of Metropolis. Players can collect and use five weapons during levels, including a plasma gun, stun gun and flamethrower, each with three levels of upgrades and infinite ammunition. Players have an energy bar depleted upon colliding with enemies or their projectiles leading to the loss of a life when empty; they can collect capsules to replenish lives and energy. It features two modes of gameplay: 'arcade mode', allowing players to choose a series of levels, and 'bounty hunter mode', which provides a set progression of levels for players to complete. There are three difficulty modes, which adjust the number of lives. The Reap also features a local co-operative mode, allowing two players to play levels on the same screen.

== Development ==
The Reap was developed by Housemarque, a Finnish development studio who had previously created the title Super Stardust, co-produced by American company Take-Two Interactive. The developers marketed the game on the speed of its graphics, and stated that the game was created using in-house engine, using techniques including a 'scanline processing system' and 'full-screen technique' to reduce the resource demands of the game's graphical capabilities. The developers stated that the Neo Geo title Viewpoint was an inspiration for the game. The Reap was showcased at the European Computer Trade Show in September 1997. Resogun and Nex Machina, titles with similar mechanics, were released by Housemarque in 2013 and 2017.

== Reception ==
Reception

Review scores
Publication	Score
GamesMaster	66%
Hyper	89%
Joystick	85%
PC PowerPlay	76%
The Games Machine (Italy)	92%
CD-Action	8/10
PC Joker	68%
PC Player	75%
Power Play	83%
Secret Service	7/10
Ultimate PC	81%

The Reap received generally positive reviews from critics. Some viewed the game as a nostalgic revival of simpler arcade shoot 'em up games such as Zaxxon with modern graphics; others, such as PC PowerPlay, felt the game only bore a superficial resemblance. Many critics enjoyed the fast pace of gameplay, and considered it challenging, although PC Player held the game had a "steep increasing difficulty level". The visual presentation of The Reap was praised, with critics citing its lighting and particle effects, although some noted the effects could be overwhelming. Describing the game as "visually stunning", Hyper commended the realism of the graphics, but found the amount of visual elements onscreen "difficult to get used to"; similarly, PC Joker found the visuals "well-executed" but could be blurry. Some reviewers also enjoyed the techno music soundtrack.
