= 2011 PlayStation Network outage =

Cyberattack surrounding PlayStation Network

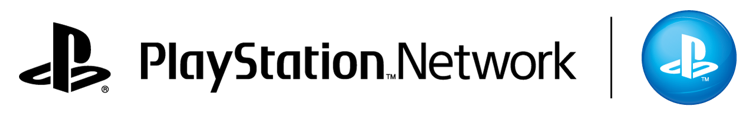
- PlayStation Network logo
- Date: April 20 – May 14, 2011
- Duration: 24 days (3 weeks and 3 days)
- Type: "External intrusion", data breach
- Target: PlayStation Network and Qriocity services
- Outcome: Services restored after 23 days of downtime, with compensation offered to PSN users; Personal data exposed for 77.1 million PlayStation Network accounts; $171 million in costs for Sony

The 2011 PlayStation Network outage (sometimes referred to as the 2011 PSN Hack) was the result of an "external intrusion" on Sony's PlayStation Network and Qriocity services, in which personal details from approximately 77 million accounts were compromised and prevented users of PlayStation 3 and PlayStation Portable consoles from accessing the service. The attack occurred between April 17 and April 19, 2011, forcing Sony to deactivate the PlayStation Network servers on April 20. The outage lasted 24 days.

Government officials in various countries voiced concern over the theft and Sony's one-week delay before warning its users. The breach resulted in the exposure and vulnerability of personally identifiable information, including usernames, physical addresses, email addresses, dates of birth, passwords, and financial details such as credit card and debit card information.

== Background ==
Sony had faced some firmware and hacking-related controversies leading up to the outage. In March 2010, Sony launched a firmware update for the PlayStation 3 which removed the ability to install third-party operating systems like Linux. This move sparked significant backlash from the modding community. George Hotz, also known as Geohot, managed to jailbreak the PS3 firmware on January 2, 2011, and began sharing the jailbreak online shortly afterward. In response, Sony sued Hotz on January 11, 2011, for his jailbreaking activities. The hacker group Anonymous initiated "Operation Sony" on April 2, 2011, as a form of protest. Sony eventually settled the lawsuit with Hotz by April 11. Following this, Anonymous called for a public protest against Sony on April 13.

== Extent of the breach ==
Personal details from approximately 77 million accounts were compromised and prevented users of PlayStation 3 and PlayStation Portable consoles from accessing the service.

Credit card data was encrypted, but Sony admitted that other user information was not encrypted at the time of the intrusion. The Daily Telegraph reported that "If the provider stores passwords unencrypted, then it's very easy for somebody else – not just an external attacker, but members of staff or contractors working on Sony's site – to get access and discover those passwords, potentially using them for nefarious means." On May 2, Sony clarified the "unencrypted" status of users' passwords, stating that:

While the passwords that were stored were not “encrypted,” they were transformed using a cryptographic hash function. There is a difference between these two types of security measures which is why we said the passwords had not been encrypted. But I want to be very clear that the passwords were not stored in our database in cleartext form.

Nearly a week after the outage, Sony confirmed that it "cannot rule out the possibility" that personally identifiable information such as PlayStation Network account username, password, home address, and email address had been compromised. Sony also mentioned the possibility that credit card data was taken—after claiming that encryption had been placed on the databases, which would partially satisfy PCI Compliance for storing credit card information on a server. Subsequent to the announcement on both the official blog and by e-mail, users were asked to safeguard credit card transactions by checking bank statements. This warning came nearly a week after the initial "external intrusion" and while the Network was turned off.

At the time of the outage, with a count of 77 million registered PlayStation Network accounts, it was not only one of the largest data security breaches, but also the longest PS Network outage in history. It surpassed the 2007 TJX hack which affected 45 million customers.

In 2012, The Guardian wrote:

The attack, which may have leaked credit card details for millions of users, has never been traced to any group – although Sony suggested not long afterwards that Anonymous might have been involved. Since then it has given no further details about who it suspects of carrying out the attack, and no data from the attack has ever been posted publicly.

== Timeline of the outage ==
=== April 20, 2011 ===
Sony acknowledged on the official PlayStation Blog that it was "aware certain functions of the PlayStation Network" were down. Upon attempting to sign in via the PlayStation 3, users received a message indicating that the network was "undergoing maintenance". The following day, Sony asked its customers for patience while the cause of outage was investigated and stated that it may take "a full day or two" to get the service fully functional again. Sony suspended all PlayStation Network and Qriocity services worldwide.

While most games remained playable in their offline modes, the PlayStation 3 was unable to play certain Capcom titles in any form. Streaming video providers throughout different regions such as Hulu, Vudu, Netflix and LoveFilm displayed the same maintenance message. Some users claimed to be able to use Netflix's streaming service but others were unable.

=== April 22, 2011 ===
Sony announced an "external intrusion" had affected the PlayStation Network and Qriocity services.

Sony expressed their regrets for the downtime and called the task of repairing the system "time-consuming" but would lead to a stronger network infrastructure and additional security.

=== April 25, 2011 ===
Sony spokesman Patrick Seybold reiterated on the PlayStation Blog that fixing and enhancing the network was a "time intensive" process with no estimated time of completion. However, the next day Sony stated that there was a "clear path to have PlayStation Network and Qriocity systems back online", with some services expected to be restored within a week. Furthermore, Sony acknowledged the "compromise of personal information as a result of an illegal intrusion on our systems."

=== April 26, 2011 ===
On April 26, 2011, Sony on the PlayStation Blog why it took so long to inform PSN users of the data theft:

There’s a difference in timing between when we identified there was an intrusion and when we learned of consumers’ data being compromised. We learned there was an intrusion April 19th and subsequently shut the services down. We then brought in outside experts to help us learn how the intrusion occurred and to conduct an investigation to determine the nature and scope of the incident. It was necessary to conduct several days of forensic analysis, and it took our experts until yesterday to understand the scope of the breach. We then shared that information with our consumers and announced it publicly this afternoon.

=== April 27, 2011 ===
Sony to provide an update in regards to a criminal investigation in a blog posted on April 27: "We are currently working with law enforcement on this matter as well as a recognized technology security firm to conduct a complete investigation. This malicious attack against our system and against our customers is a criminal act and we are proceeding aggressively to find those responsible."

=== May 1, 2011 ===
Sony announced a "Welcome Back" program for customers affected by the outage. The company also confirmed that some PSN and Qriocity services would be available during the first week of May.

=== May 2, 2011 ===
Sony issued a press release, according to which the Sony Online Entertainment (SOE) services had been taken offline for maintenance due to potentially related activities during the initial criminal hack. Over 12,000 credit card numbers, albeit in encrypted form, from non-U.S. cardholders and additional information from 24.7 million SOE accounts may have been accessed.

During the week, Sony sent a letter to the US House of Representatives, answering questions and concerns about the event. In the letter Sony announced that they would be providing Identity Theft insurance policies in the amount of US$1 million per user of the PlayStation Network and Qriocity services, despite no reports of credit card fraud being indicated. This was later confirmed on the PlayStation Blog, where it was announced that the service, AllClear ID Plus powered by Debix, would be available to users in the United States free for 12 months, and would include Internet surveillance, complete identity repair in the event of theft and a $1 million identity theft insurance policy for each user.

=== May 3, 2011 ===
Sony Computer Entertainment CEO Kazuo Hirai reiterated said the "external intrusion" which had caused them to shut down the PlayStation Network constituted a "criminal cyber attack". Hirai expanded further, claiming that Sony systems had been under attack prior to the outage "for the past month and half", suggesting a concerted attempt to target Sony.

On May 3 Sony stated in a press release that there may be a correlation between the attack that had occurred on April 16 towards the PlayStation Network and one that compromised Sony Online Entertainment on May 2. This portion of the attack resulted in the theft of information on 24.6 million Sony Online Entertainment account holders. The database contained 12,700 credit card numbers, particularly those of non-U.S. residents, and had not been in use since 2007 as much of the data applied to expired cards and deleted accounts. Sony updated this information the following day by stating that only 900 cards on the database were still valid. The attack resulted in the suspension of SOE servers and Facebook games. SOE granted 30 days of free time, plus one day for each day the server was down, to users of Clone Wars Adventures, DC Universe Online, EverQuest, EverQuest II, EverQuest Online Adventures, Free Realms, Pirates of the Burning Sea, PlanetSide, Poxnora, Star Wars Galaxies and Vanguard: Saga of Heroes, as well as other forms of compensation for all other Sony Online games.

=== May 4, 2011 ===
Sony announced that it was adding Data Forte to the investigation team of Guidance Software and Protiviti in analysing the attacks. Legal aspects of the case were handled by Baker & McKenzie. Sony stated their belief that Anonymous, a decentralized unorganized loosely affiliated group of hackers and activists may have performed the attack. No Anons claimed any involvement.

=== May 6, 2011 ===
Sony stated they had begun "final stages of internal testing" for the PlayStation Network, which had been rebuilt. However, the following day Sony reported that they would not be able to bring services back online within the one-week timeframe given on May 1, because "the extent of the attack on Sony Online Entertainment servers" had not been known at the time. SOE confirmed on their Twitter account that their games would not be available until some time after the weekend.

Reuters began reporting the event as "the biggest Internet security break-in ever". A Sony spokesperson said:

- Sony had removed the personal details of 2,500 people stolen by hackers and posted on a website
- The data included names and some addresses, which were in a database created in 2001
- No date had been fixed for the restart

=== May 14, 2011 ===
Various services began coming back online on a country-by-country basis, starting with North America. These services included: sign-in for PSN and Qriocity services (including password resetting), online game-play on PS3 and PSP, playback of rental video content, Music Unlimited service (PS3 and PC), access to third party services (such as Netflix, Hulu, Vudu and MLB.tv), friends list, chat functionality and PlayStation Home. The actions came with a firmware update for the PS3, version 3.61. As of May 15 service in Japan and East Asia had not yet been approved. Sony began restoring services in Japan in phases on May 28, 2011. It later announced that all PlayStation Network and Qriocity services in Japan would be fully restored on July 6.

=== May 18, 2011 ===
Sony shut down the password reset page on their site following the discovery of another exploit that allowed users to reset other users' passwords, using the other user's email address and date of birth. Sign-in using PSN details to various other Sony websites was also disabled, but console sign-ins were not affected.

=== May 23, 2011 ===
Sony stated that the outage costs were $171 million.

== Reaction ==
Graham Cluley, senior technology consultant at Sophos, said the breach "certainly ranks as one of the biggest data losses ever to affect individuals".

Security experts Eugene Lapidous of AnchorFree, Chester Wisniewski of Sophos Canada and Avner Levin of Ryerson University (now Toronto Metropolitan University) criticized Sony, questioning its methods of securing user data. Lapidous called the breach "difficult to excuse" and Wisniewski called it "an act of hubris or simply gross incompetence".

=== Government reactions ===
US Senator Richard Blumenthal of Connecticut demanded answers from Sony about the data breach by emailing SCEA CEO Jack Tretton arguing about the delay in informing its customers and insisting that Sony do more for its customers than just offer free credit reporting services. Blumenthal later called for an investigation by the US Department of Justice to find the person or persons responsible and to determine if Sony was liable for the way that it handled the situation.

Congresswoman Mary Bono Mack and Congressman G. K. Butterfield sent a letter to Sony, demanding information on when the breach was discovered and how the crisis would be handled.

Privacy Commissioner of Canada Jennifer Stoddart confirmed that the Canadian authorities would investigate. The Commissioner's office conveyed their concern as to why the authorities in Canada weren't informed of a security breach earlier.

Following a formal investigation of Sony for breaches of the UK's Data Protection Act 1998, the Information Commissioner's Office fined Sony £250,000 ($395k) and issued a statement highly critical of the security Sony had in place:

If you are responsible for so many payment card details and log-in details then keeping that personal data secure has to be your priority. In this case that just didn't happen, and when the database was targeted – albeit in a determined criminal attack – the security measures in place were simply not good enough. There's no disguising that this is a business that should have known better. It is a company that trades on its technical expertise, and there's no doubt in my mind that they had access to both the technical knowledge and the resources to keep this information safe.

=== Legal action against Sony ===
A lawsuit was posted on April 27 by Kristopher Johns from Birmingham, Alabama on behalf of all PlayStation users alleging Sony "failed to encrypt data and establish adequate firewalls to handle a server intrusion contingency, failed to provide prompt and adequate warnings of security breaches, and unreasonably delayed in bringing the PSN service back online." According to the complaint filed in the lawsuit, Sony failed to notify members of a possible security breach and storing members' credit card information, a violation of PCI Compliance—the digital security standard for the Payment Card Industry.

A Canadian lawsuit against Sony USA, Sony Canada and Sony Japan claimed damages up to C$1 billion including free credit monitoring and identity theft insurance. The plaintiff was quoted as saying, "If you can't trust a huge multi-national corporation like Sony to protect your private information, who can you trust? It appears to me that Sony focuses more on protecting its games than its PlayStation users".

In October 2012 a California judge dismissed a lawsuit against Sony over the PSN security breach, ruling that Sony had not violated California's consumer-protection laws, citing "there is no such thing as perfect security". In July 2014 Sony agreed to a preliminary $15 million settlement of the consolidated class action, which brought together more than 50 lawsuits filed over the breach. The proposed benefits included free games, PlayStation 3 themes or PlayStation Plus subscriptions for affected account holders. Sony also offered to reimburse up to $2,500 per documented identity-theft claim, capped at $1 million in total.

=== Compensation to users ===
In a press conference in Tokyo on May 1, Sony announced a "Welcome Back" program. As well as "selected PlayStation entertainment content", the program promised to include 30 days free membership of PlayStation Plus for all PSN members, while existing PlayStation Plus members received an additional 30 days on their subscription. Qriocity subscribers received 30 days. Sony promised other content and services over the coming weeks.

Hulu compensated PlayStation 3 users for the inability to use their service during the outage by offering one week of free service to Hulu Plus members.

On May 16, 2011, Sony announced that two PlayStation 3 games and two PSP games would be offered for free from lists of five and four,^{†} respectively. The games available varied by region and were only available in countries which had access to the PlayStation Store prior to the outage. On May 27, 2011, Sony announced the "welcome back" package for Japan and the Asia region (Hong Kong, Singapore, Malaysia, Thailand and Indonesia). In the Asia region, a theme - Dokodemo Issyo Spring Theme - was offered for free in addition to the games available in the "welcome back" package.

^† 5 PSP games are offered in the Japanese market.

PS3 games available by region
Game	North America	Europe (non-Germany)	Germany	Asia	Japan
Wipeout HD/Fury	Yes	Yes	Yes	Yes	Yes
LittleBigPlanet	Yes	Yes	Yes	No	No
InFamous	Yes	Yes	No	No	No
Dead Nation	Yes	Yes	No	No	No
Super Stardust HD	Yes	No	Yes	No	No
Ratchet & Clank: Quest for Booty	No	Yes	Yes	No	No
Hustle Kings	No	No	Yes	Yes	Yes
The Last Guy	No	No	No	Yes	Yes
Trash Panic	No	No	No	Yes	No
LocoRoco Cocoreccho!	No	No	No	Yes	Yes
Echochrome	No	No	No	No	Yes

PSP games available by region
Game	North America	Europe (non-Germany)	Germany	Asia	Japan
LittleBigPlanet	Yes	Yes	Yes	Yes	Yes
ModNation Racers	Yes	Yes	Yes	Yes	No
Pursuit Force	Yes	Yes	No	No	No
Killzone: Liberation^{‡}	Yes	Yes	No	No	No
Everybody's Golf Portable 2	No	No	Yes	No	No
Buzz! Junior: Jungle Party	No	No	Yes	No	No
Everybody's Stress Buster	No	No	No	Yes	Yes
LocoRoco Midnight Carnival	No	No	No	Yes	Yes
Patapon 2	No	No	No	No	Yes
What Did I Do to Deserve This, My Lord?	No	No	No	No	Yes

^‡ Version of Killzone Liberation offered does not offer online gameplay functionality.

=== Credit card fraud ===
There were reports on the Internet that some users experienced credit card fraud; however, they were yet to be linked to the incident. Sony said that the CSC codes requested by their services were not stored, but hackers may have been able to decrypt or record credit card details while inside Sony's network.

On May 5, a letter from Sony Corporation of America CEO and President Sir Howard Stringer emphasized that there had been no evidence of credit card fraud and that a $1 million identity theft insurance policy would be available to PSN and Qriocity users.

== See also ==
- Criticism of Sony
