= Stardust (1993 video game) =

Multidirectional shooter video game

- Developer: Bloodhouse
- Publisher: Bloodhouse
- Platforms: Amiga, Atari ST, MS-DOS
- Release: EU: 1993
- Genre: Multidirectional shooter
- Mode: Single-player

Stardust is a 1993 multidirectional shooter video game developed and published by Bloodhouse for the Amiga. The game is an Asteroids clone with enhancements, such as power-ups, shields, a high-energy techno module soundtrack, vivid use of colors and the occasional tunnel section that revolves around a sphere. The game's graphics drew critical acclaim for the aforementioned tunnels and the liberal use of ray-tracing. The company has since merged with Terramarque to form Housemarque.

The Finnish developers gave several things ludicrous names in their own language, which were (and still are) highly obscure in the international market. The damsel in distress is named after a brand of margarine, and the final confrontation takes place over the planet Imatra.

== Ports ==
The game was ported to MS-DOS, but not by the original programmers. This version was buggy, scant on details found in the Amiga version and severely lacking in both control and gameplay polish.

A conversion was made for the Atari STE by Aggression demoscene crew, published in 1995 by Daze Marketing. It is one of the few STE exclusive games, and uses the machine's updated capabilities.

== Legacy ==
An enhanced sequel named Super Stardust was released in 1994 for AGA Amigas, in 1995 for Amiga CD32, and finally in 1996 for the IBM PC compatible platform as well (the latter also known as Super Stardust '96). The Amiga CD32 and IBM PC compatible versions were released on CD and featured a CD soundtrack from Slusnik Luna, FMV cut-scenes, high speed gameplay and completely new levels and enemies.

In April 2007, Bloodhouse's successor Housemarque developed Super Stardust HD, released by Sony Computer Entertainment as a downloadable PlayStation Network game for the PlayStation 3.

In February 2012, Super Stardust Delta was released on the PlayStation Network as a downloadable title for the PlayStation Vita.

Sony Interactive Entertainment owns the game and its sequels, as they had acquired Housemarque in 2021 through PlayStation Studios.
