= Nex Machina =

2017 video game

- Developer: Housemarque
- Publisher: Housemarque
- Director: Harry Krueger
- Producer: Jari Kantomaa
- Programmer: Tero Tarkiainen
- Artist: Mikko Sinisalo
- Composer: Ari Pulkkinen
- Platforms: PlayStation 4, Windows
- Release: 20 June 2017
- Genre: Multi-directional shooter
- Modes: Single-player, multiplayer

Nex Machina is a 2017 shoot 'em up video game developed and published by Housemarque. The game was released for PlayStation 4 and Windows on 20 June 2017. It received positive reviews from critics.

== Gameplay ==
A player fighting off enemies while trying to save a human. Destroyed enemies explode into voxels.

Nex Machina is a twin-stick shoot 'em up video game played from a top-down perspective. Players move through rooms shooting waves of enemies while attempting to save humans. Power-ups and weapon upgrades are dispersed throughout levels.

== Development ==
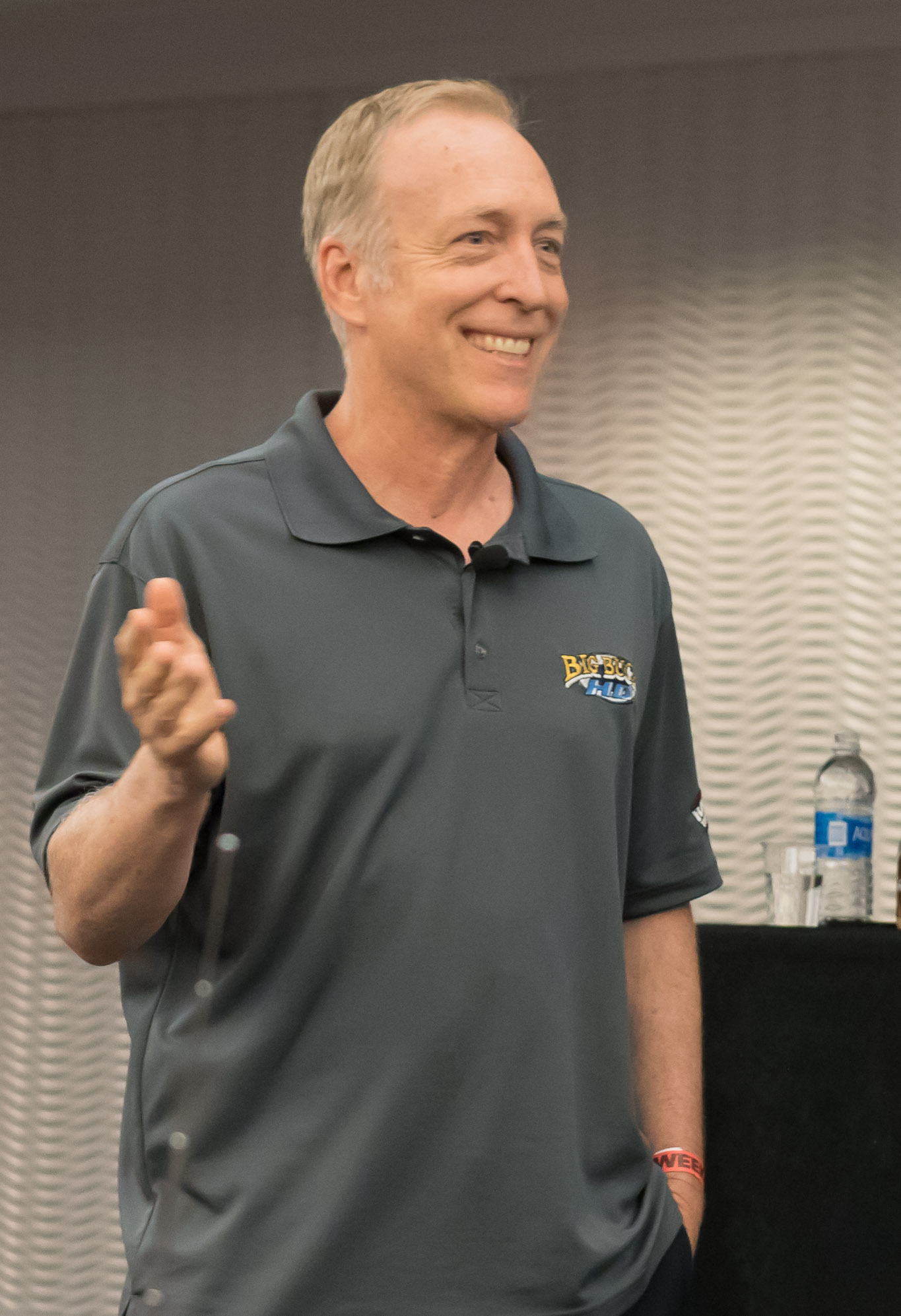
Jarvis in 2016

Nex Machina was developed by Finnish video game studio Housemarque with designer Eugene Jarvis serving as a creative consultant. Jarvis is known for his role in designing arcade shoot 'em ups such as Defender (1981), Robotron: 2084 (1982), and Smash TV (1990). At the 2014 D.I.C.E. Awards, Housemarque's founders Ilari Kuittinen and Harri Tikkanen met with Jarvis and asked him if he would be interested in collaborating on a game. Jarvis' games, particularly Defender, was a source of inspiration for Housemarque's 2013 game Resogun. For the design of Nex Machina, they combined elements from Jarvis' previous shoot 'em ups and Resogun. The development team experimented with different setups for the game's firing mechanics. They followed a different design philosophy than their 2016 game Alienation by choosing not to incorporate character progression systems in Nex Machina.

Nex Machina is powered by a significantly enhanced version of the game engine and voxel technology that was used for Resogun. The inclusion of a volumetric rendering technique known as Signed Distance Fields allows for a smooth transition between complex 3D meshes and voxel particles to give them more flexibility in how objects appear on the screen. The studio dubbed their art style for the game as cablepunk—a darker take on cyberpunk.

== Release ==
Nex Machina was revealed at the PlayStation Experience in December 2016. Housemarque signed a deal with Sony Interactive Entertainment to bring the game to the PlayStation 4. In March 2017, Housemarque announced that the game will also be released for Windows. Nex Machina was released on 20 June 2017; it is Housemarque's first self-published game. Housemarque is also considering creating a Nex Machina arcade cabinet with Jarvis' company Raw Thrills.

== Reception ==
Reception

Aggregate score
| Aggregator | Score |
|---|---|
| Metacritic | (PC) 84/100 (PS4) 88/100 |

Review scores
| Publication | Score |
|---|---|
| Destructoid | 9.5/10 |
| Edge | 9/10 |
| GameSpot | 9/10 |
| PC Gamer (US) | 89/100 |

Nex Machina received "generally favorable" reviews from critics, according to review aggregator website Metacritic.

Eurogamer ranked the game eighth on their list of the "Top 50 Games of 2017".

=== Accolades ===
Nex Machina was nominated for "PlayStation Game of the Year" at the Golden Joystick Awards, for "Best PC Game" in Destructoid's Game of the Year Awards 2017, and for "Best Action Game" in IGN's Best of 2017 Awards. It won the award for "Best Indie Action Game" in Game Informer's 2017 Action Game of the Year Awards. It won "Big Screen Game of the Year 2017" and "Finnish Game of the Year 2017" in the Finnish Game Awards 2018, and was also nominated for "Visual Design" and "Music Design" at the 2018 Develop Awards.
