= Knack (video game) =

2013 video game

- European box art
- Developer: Japan Studio
- Publisher: Sony Computer Entertainment
- Director: Mark Cerny
- Producer: Yusuke Watanabe
- Programmer: Tsuyoshi Murakami
- Artist: Yoshiaki Yamaguchi
- Writer: Mark Cerny
- Composers: Matthew Margeson; Wataru Hokoyama
- Series: Knack
- Platform: PlayStation 4
- Release: NA: November 15, 2013; PAL: November 29, 2013; JP: February 22, 2014
- Genres: Beat 'em up, platform
- Modes: Single-player, multiplayer

Knack (Note: Japanese: ナック, Hepburn: Nakku) is a beat 'em up platform game developed by Japan Studio and published by Sony Computer Entertainment for the PlayStation 4. The game was released in North America, Europe, and Australia in November 2013, and in Japan in February 2014, where it was available as a bundle with the console.

The player navigates the titular character Knack through a series of levels viewed in a fixed camera, third-person-style view. Knack is a living humanoid organism that consists of Relics; a large central Relic is always surrounded by a varying number of smaller Relics. Knack utilizes jumping, dodging, punching, and using enhanced energy-based powers, in order to progress through the colourful environments, which are populated with enemies. The story follows Knack and his creator on a journey to save humankind from a species known as the Goblins. However, one of Knack's creator's former friends goes rogue, and Knack and his allies must stop the antagonist's evil plans.

Upon release, Knack received mixed reviews from critics, who praised the game's original concept and ideas, but criticized the gameplay, level of difficulty, and story. A sequel, Knack II, was announced at the 2016 PlayStation Experience, and was released in September 2017.

== Gameplay ==
A gameplay screenshot of Knack, displaying the health bar and level of Sunstone energy acquired in the upper left corner

Knack is a platforming beat 'em up game in which players control the title character, Knack. Game director Mark Cerny describes the gameplay as "a little bit like Crash Bandicoot, and a little bit like Katamari Damacy", with "a touch of God of War in there". Players control Knack through a series of long, linear levels, journeying from start to finish, while battling enemies, such as humans, robots, and vehicles, finding secret hidden objects that give Knack upgrades, climbing, destroying objects, and completing jumping and switch-based puzzles. The perspective in which the game is played is similar to that in the God of War games. Players only control Knack and do not control the camera. The camera follows Knack in a combination of third-person and 2.5D angles.

Players guide Knack through many levels in many different locations. Each location is different and players follow the objectives played out in the story. The environments are brightly coloured, consisting of bright and vibrant greens, oranges, blues, and greys. Locations visited in the game include mineshafts, forests, factories, mansions, gardens, mountains, cities, laboratories, castles, rock formations, and caves. Gameplay is focused on brawling fighting combat and platforming.

Knack is essentially a large Relic which attracts many small Relics to itself to create a living organism. Knack varies in size; he can be the size of a human child when only a few Relics are incorporated around the big Relic, the size of a gorilla when a moderate number of Relics are incorporated, or the size of small skyscrapers when a very large number of Relics are used. Knack has different abilities for each of his states, even though the player primarily utilizes punching, jumping, and dodging abilities; a small Knack jumps higher, moves faster, and is weak, breaking in a small number of hits, while a large Knack can walk over enemies to defeat them, and pick up or break large objects, such as vehicles and buildings. Apart from the Relics, Knack can surround the large central Relic with ice, metal, wood, and other substances. Knack may use the energy absorbed from Sunstones to unleash powerful tornado attacks, shockwaves, and projectiles. Knack gains new abilities from level to level; for example he can lift up and throw cars in his large form, and use specific objects involved in the story. Knack's voice also changes with his size; Knack's voice is nonexistent when in his smallest form, while in his largest form, his voice is deep, loud, and intimidating.

== Plot ==
In a futuristic society, humanity has progressed in technological advances by harvesting the energy from Relics, physical remnants of a lost civilization. Humans are reviled by the primitive Goblin species, who years prior had waged war upon the humans but ended up being driven from their cities and forced to live in the wilds.

After a force of Goblins commandeering tanks overrun a human outpost, the city of Newhaven organizes an expedition to discover how the weaponry was acquired. Explorer Ryder volunteers, joining billionaire industrialist Viktor and his head of security, Katrina. Doctor Vargas demonstrates his creation, Knack, an organism consisting of Relics, able to control his size. Knack, Vargas, and his assistant and Ryder's nephew, Lucas, consequently partake. The group trace the weapons to a goblin fortress. Knack defeats its chief Morgack, who reveals that a goblin named Gundahar gave him the weapons. Viktor double-crosses the others by kidnapping Lucas, forcing Vargas and Knack to follow, while Ryder questions Morgack. Gundahar later arrives, forcing Ryder to escape.

Returning to his palace, Viktor unveils one of many giant relics to Vargas, Knack, and Lucas, intending to use them to usher the world into a new technological revolution. The trio flee Viktor and discover a map of Trogdo Mine that the relics had been unearthed from, illustrating a locked area which contains even larger relics that Viktor believes Knack can access. At the mine, Knack fails to open the door. Viktor and Katrina corner them and have Knack shot, where he falls down a shaft. Knack enters an ancient cavern where he is ejected by creatures known as Guardians and reaches a nearby castle owned by Viktor. Vargas and Lucas are imprisoned in the castle. Ryder tracks and rescues Vargas and Lucas with the help of Knack.

A Goblin army led by Gundahar invades Ryder's hometown of Monte Verde to steal relics. Vargas, Ryder, and Lucas fashion trackers to find the Goblins' main base. Knack forces Gundahar to leave; tracking the goblins, they reach a factory manufacturing weapons. Vargas is met by Charlotte, his former lover whom he had presumed dead 20 years ago when she had fallen into a chasm. She had been found by Gundahar and nursed back to health; in return, she created arms for him to combat rival goblin factions. After Gundahar turned to attacking human settlements, Charlotte stopped production. Ashamed, she refuses to leave with Vargas. Knack destroys the weapon stores, but Gundahar flees and forces Charlotte to repair the armaments or be cast out. Charlotte sends a message to Vargas, begging him to save her.

In the Barren Wastes, following Ryder's prior discovery, the group enter a temple containing a mural of the door within Trogdo Mine; it depicts the key, which resides beneath Obelisk Mountain, but warns of danger beyond the door. Inside Obelisk Mountain, the group are caught by Viktor and Katrina, having bugged Lucas, but Knack blocks them off with a cave-in. Lucas reminds them of the warnings and persuades them to destroy the key, but Katrina takes it using a mech, triggering a volcanic eruption. Knack defeats Katrina, where she falls towards the lava. Viktor prepares to leave with the key on his airship. Ryder sights Katrina lying on some rubble, and stays behind to save her. Vargas, Knack, and Lucas board the airship.

The three presume Ryder dead following an explosion in the mountain. Vargas receives Charlotte's message and sets the airship to fly to the factory. Viktor traps and ejects them, though Knack saves Vargas and Lucas. They reunite with Charlotte and leave in her aircraft. Viktor succeeds in opening the door in Trogdo Mine, revealing an ancient chamber containing an orb, which disintegrates him. Immediately, the area and Guardians emerge from out of the ground. Charlotte's ship is damaged, forcing the group to land, and Knack leaves to confront the orb. It attaches itself to a Guardian, which Knack battles, destroying the orb. The source eradicated, the expanse of stonework recedes underground.

A parade is held for the group in Newhaven, where Knack, Vargas, and Lucas receive medals. As Vargas leads a eulogy for Ryder, Ryder walks through a desert carrying Katrina towards the city.

== Development and release ==
Knack was envisioned as the PlayStation 4 equivalent of a Crash Bandicoot title. Knack was the first PS4 game shown to the public. Sony Computer Entertainment decided to do this because they wanted to prove that the PS4's launch lineup did not exclusively consist of big-budget first-person shooters. Because of Knack's intentional similarities to the successful Crash Bandicoot series, Sony Computer Entertainment felt it would be a smart business decision to heavily market Knack as an essential PS4 title. However, some critics questioned this decision.

The initial idea for Knack was that of a character that could find items and add them to his body thus causing him to grow with Cerny explaining "Our initial concept was that Knack would maybe break down a building or a wall, and he’d incorporate the resulting bricks into his body," This, in practice, however did not work well resulting in " a giant amorphous blob of a character." After a year and a half the team realized that the character had to be designed "more intensively." Instead of incorporating random elements into him he would now instead be made of relics which allowed the developers to make a functioning character.

Cerny attempted to target a dual audience with the game attempting to appeal to both core gamers as well as players who "never picked up a controller before in their life," Cerny would later admit that this "may have taken us off in a bit of a wrong direction" noting that in addition to catering to both set of players the game also had to be a launch title for the system. After interviewing Cerny about the sequel Polygon reporter, Colin Campbell came away with the impression that the original was "created under less-than-ideal conditions"

In wanting to make a "21st Century Crash Bandicoot" Cerny wanted the game to be smaller in scope than other contemporary games at the time. Despite this Cerny realized that audience expectations were different from when the Crash games were developed and that Knack had to be more "complex" adding " Even if the vision is to be in that sort of genre, to try to speak to the nostalgia that people have for the experiences of years gone by, it turns out you need to do five or 10 times as much today." In addition to Crash Bandicoot, other influences for the game include Katamari Damacy and God of War.

Despite years of experience in the industry Knack marks the first game which Cerny directed, explaining to website Gamasutra "We didn't have directors back in the day, because if you have a three-person project you don't worry about calling somebody a 'director.'" Cerny initially envisioned himself as taking a more hands off approach intending himself to merely be a producer but as the game grew he found himself becoming more involved eventually becoming the director.

To promote the launch of the game, Sony Computer Entertainment and Japan Studio released a free mobile game called Knack's Quest on November 6, 2013. The game is a tile-matching puzzle game for iOS and Android devices. The game allows connectivity with players' PlayStation Network accounts to unlock special Relics within the main game.

Knack was released in China as Knack's Adventure at the PlayStation 4's launch on March 20, 2015.

== Reception ==
Reception

Aggregate score
Aggregator	Score
Metacritic	54/100

Review scores
Publication	Score
Destructoid	7/10
Edge	3/10
Electronic Gaming Monthly	4.5/10
Eurogamer	4/10
Famitsu	6/10, 7/10, 8/10, 7/10
Game Informer	8.25/10
GameRevolution	2/5
GameSpot	4/10
GameTrailers	5/10
Giant Bomb	2/5
IGN	5.9/10
Joystiq	1.5/5
PlayStation Official Magazine – UK	4/10
Polygon	6/10
Digital Spy	3/5
The Escapist	3/5

=== Critical reception ===
Knack received "mixed or average" reviews from critics, according to the review aggregator website Metacritic.

Steve Butts of IGN praised the concept and the hero but criticized the gameplay and the story by saying "Knack's shifting size is a great idea that never really grows into anything substantial". Tom McShea of GameSpot praised some elements of the game, such as the environments, but also criticized the story, gameplay, and "surprisingly high" difficulty. McShea said, "There's not one element of Knack to rally around, to excite you. And without that special something, Knack crumbles just like its piecemeal protagonist." Tom Bramwell of Eurogamer criticized the lack of depth in the gameplay and the checkpoint balancing. Bramwell stated that "Knack isn't the kind of game you'll want to take home with your PlayStation 4. I'm all in favour of games that transport us back to the good old days of vibrant originality, but Knack simply doesn't."

On the other hand, Game Informer's Matt Helgeson said that it's "not the most innovative or the most visually dazzling game. This won't be the one you put in to show off your new console to your friends. However, when you're done with the prettied-up versions of the big franchises, you'll find yourself wanting to return to Knack. It's got charm and heart, and offers a whole lot of good gameplay. Ultimately, that's still what's important - no matter which generation we're in." Destructoid's Dale North called the game "A fun romp, and definitely worth a play. It's easy to pick up, a joy to look at, and some of the boss battles are pretty great. My recommendation is that you take it in smaller doses, or try out the drop-in/drop-out cooperative play, which will definitely help when the going gets tough." VentureBeat's McKinley Noble called the game "a solid adventure with some surprising care put into a lot of elements that most games take for granted", but lamented the game's limited combat, linear gameplay, and shallow technical polish. In Japan, Famitsu gave it a score of one six, one seven, one eight, and one seven for a total of 28 out of 40 in its PlayStation 4 launch issue in February 2014.

411Mania's Gavin Napier gave it a score of 8 out of 10 and called it "An easily accessible, throwback game that's appropriate for family enjoyment." The National Post's Chad Sapieha gave it a score of 7.5 out of 10 and said that "even with its not-quite-fully-delivered-upon promise – [Knack] may still be worth picking up." GameZone's Lance Liebl also gave it a score of 7.5 out of 10 and said that the multiplayer "makes Knack the best game for kids and the family to enjoy on the PlayStation 4 at the moment. There's still the lack of a well thought-out story, and the game disengages the player far too often with cutscenes to simply show Knack jump, but it's a game that will both offer a challenge and introduce kids to a simple brawler-platformer." Peter Nowak of The Globe and Mail gave it an average review and called it "a solid initial effort, despite it being a little long and rather hard." Scott Nichols of Digital Spy gave it three stars out of five and said the game "has its moments, and PlayStation 4 owners starved for something to play on their shiny new console will appreciate that the game actually becomes more fun to play the second time around, allowing it to keep players busy during the several month drought that seems to follow every system launch." Paul Goodman of The Escapist similarly gave it three stars out of five and said it was "a colorful, but mediocre platformer that has issues with repetitive gameplay on top of being frustratingly difficult at times." Steve Boxer of The Guardian likewise gave it three stars out of five and said, "Knack isn't a bad game: there is satisfaction to be derived from it, some of the gameplay is genuinely good fun (at its best moments, it does begin to acquire an air reminiscent of a more ponderous Crash Bandicoot), and it's one of the longer games to emerge in recent years, so will at least keep youngsters occupied for decent periods of time. But neither is it a particularly good game, which is hugely disappointing given that it's supposed to be one of the flagship reasons for buying a PlayStation 4."

However, Dave Riley of Anime News Network gave the game a C and said, "There's very little in Knack that inspires passion. What we have here may be a technical marvel, but only the engineers will know for sure. From the outside looking in, if they'd spent half as much time on any other part of the game as they did animating the bits and bobs, maybe Knack would've contained something worth caring about." James Marshall of The Digital Fix likewise gave it 5 out of 10 and said it was "something constructed of relics – from the basic gameplay to the poor characterisation, nearly everything feels like something from two console generations ago." David Jenkins of Metro gave it 3 out of 10 and called it "A poor quality video game by any measure, but what this joyless throwback is doing being a key launch title for the PlayStation 4 Sony only knows."

Sony's Shuhei Yoshida expressed disappointment at Knack's critical reception, hoping the game would receive scores in the mid-70s. However, he emphasised that Knack was "not the type of game reviewers would score high for the launch of a next-gen system" and instead, the game was a message that the PlayStation 4 was "not just trying to cater only to the hardcore".

YouTuber videogamedunkey facetiously celebrated Knack, leading to the game series becoming a running gag on his YouTube channel. His sincere criticism of Knack cited simplistic gameplay and weak character design as fatal flaws.

=== Sales ===
Knack sold 322,083 units in its first two days on sale in Japan as a pack-in game.

== Sequel ==
In December 2016, Sony announced Knack II at the 2016 PlayStation Experience event. The game was released for the PlayStation 4 in September 2017.
