= Sony hack =

Sony hack may refer to one of these cybersecurity incidents targeting the Japanese multinational conglomerate Sony:

- 2011 PlayStation Network outage, caused by a cyberattack
- 2014 Sony Pictures hack, 2014 hack allegedly caused by North Korean hackers
