= Alienation (video game) =

Shooter video game

- Developer: Housemarque
- Publisher: Sony Interactive Entertainment
- Director: Harri Tikkanen
- Producer: Sami Koistinen
- Designer: Kristian Vuorinen
- Programmers: Markku Velinen; Jere Sanisalo
- Artist: Antti Kallioinen
- Writers: David Navarro; Ville Vuorela
- Composer: Ari Pulkkinen
- Platform: PlayStation 4
- Release: April 26, 2016
- Genres: Twin-stick shooter, action role-playing
- Modes: Single-player, multiplayer

Alienation is an action role-playing shooter video game developed by Housemarque and published by Sony Interactive Entertainment for the PlayStation 4. It was released in April 2016 worldwide. The game is an isometric twin-stick shooter in which one to four players defend themselves against an alien invasion on Earth through increasingly-difficult levels. Players can choose one of three character classes, each with its own abilities. Players can upgrade their weapons with collectables, known as upgrade cores.

The development of Alienation was hinted at in early January 2014 and announced at the 2014 Sony Gamescom convention. In 2015, the developers released details of the gameplay and classes and its first trailer. According to Sony, the game would be released sometime in 2015; it was delayed until March 2, 2016. After another three-week delay, it was released as part of a Sony promotion releasing six games in seven weeks. Since the release of Alienation, Housemarque has updated the game with free and paid expansions. It received generally positive reviews, with praise for the twin-stick elements and cooperative multiplayer feature. Reviewers criticized the lack of a local co-op mode, which was later added, as well as the game's lack of variety in regard to weapons and ammunition.

== Gameplay and plot ==
Screenshot of Alienation's gameplay. The minimap is in the top left-hand corner, and the player's weapons and abilities are shown in the bottom left-hand corner. The player's level is shown in the bottom right-hand corner.

Alienation is an isometric twin-stick shooter game set in a future in which aliens are invading Earth. After a large portion of the population has been murdered or mutated, humanity's fate rests with a group of four soldiers from UNX (a military group assembled to help prevent alien attacks). The game features a single-player mode, a local co-op mode, and a multiplayer mode that allows four people to play at once, with each player controlling a heavily modified soldier from one of three character classes: Bio-Specialist, Saboteur, and Tank. Each class has its own weapons, movement mechanics, and abilities, and can be "leveled up" to level thirty. The Bio-Specialist can heal other team members and create poisonous trails. The Tank is able to create a shield behind which players can stand and can "blow everything away", allowing players to maneuver more easily. The Saboteur has the ability to become invisible, and can call in airstrikes when needed. Players defend themselves against hordes of aliens through increasingly-difficult levels. In multiplayer mode, players can revive each other and use checkpoints in the levels to respawn if they die.

Players can find new weapons in random drops. Many weapons contain slots for the insertion of "upgrade cores"; depending on the core, upgrades can affect a weapon's rate of fire, clip size, damage, or other mechanics. Random items and loot, such as new (and more powerful) weapons and upgrade cores, drop at random intervals and when enemies are defeated. The class of a drop differs by rarity, ranging from "stock" to "legendary" class. Unwanted items can be converted into metal, which is then used to re-roll a weapon's statistics. Aiming is accomplished by targeting a blue laser in the direction a player wishes to shoot. Players can "dash and melee", knocking down many enemies at once to give themselves more space.

When a player accumulates enough experience, they "level up" and can spend points on three active and three passive abilities, chosen from several options on a trio of skill trees. Each ability has a cooldown timer, requiring players to use them strategically. Points may be switched from one skill tree to another at any time. When a player dies, their experience multiplier is reset. When Alienation's story mode is completed, the player unlocks missions with bounty-like assignments and quests with special items as rewards. The player unlocks more difficult enemies, more powerful weapons, and the ability to complete difficult, procedurally-generated, levels set in the alien's space craft. Two types of "keys" are unlocked at the end of the game. UFO keys are used for "loot runs", and ark keys are used for player-vs-player fights.

== Development and release ==
... And then we start iterating. We happily admit that we do borrow from what we think are some of the greatest games ever, but then we reinvent them in the Housemarque way. For example, we play a lot of Dark Souls and Demon Souls, and a lot of different stuff to get inspiration. Then we take a concept we like and try and improve it or put a twist on it.

— Mikael Haveri, developer at Housemarque

Alienation was developed by Finnish video game company Housemarque and published by Sony Interactive Entertainment. It was released on April 26, 2016 exclusively for the PlayStation 4. The game, first hinted at in January 2014, was announced at the 2014 Sony Gamescom conference. In a question-and-answer article on the PlayStation Blog in April 2014, Mikael Haveri of Housemarque said that they are inspired for many of their games by other games. Haveri cited Dark Souls and Demon's Souls as examples, saying that they "take a concept [the developers] like and try and improve it or put a twist on it". According to Haveri, Alienation would have content (such as better explosion mechanics) which players had not seen before. He noted the chance of references to other Housemarque games, similar to how the incorporation of Resogun ships into Dead Nation.

In April 2015 the developers released details about Alienation's gameplay, saying that it would feature three character classes, and "plenty of loot and a ton of weapon customization". Details about enemies were also posted. The same day, Housemarque released a two-and-a-half-minute pre-alpha gameplay video demonstrating the cooperative gameplay feature. In early 2016, Alienation was showcased at Sony's PlayStation Digital Showcase.

Sony announced that Alienation would be released sometime in 2015. The game was later delayed until March 2, 2016, and further pushed back to March 23. Another delay postponed its release until April 26, when it was part of Sony's PlayStation Store Launch Party 2016 promotion: six games released over a seven-week period.

=== After release ===
Since Alienation's release, Housemarque has updated and added downloadable content (DLC) to the game. Ranked leagues and a local co-op mode were introduced in early July 2016. Other customization options, including bullet colors, were added. Two new difficulty levels (master and expert) and new "hero levels" were also added. On July 5, a season pass and the first DLC (the Survivor's Pack) were introduced, along with a mention of upcoming DLC titled the Conqueror's Pack. On August 23, Housemarque introduced three new DLC: the Weapons Pack, the Armor Paint Pack and the Veteran Heroes pack, all of which (with the Survivor's Pack and the Conqueror's Pack) were included in the season pass. Weekly missions were introduced to give players an additional challenge, with another difficulty level also added.

== Reception ==
Alienation

Aggregate score
Aggregator	Score
Metacritic	79/100

Review scores
Publication	Score
Destructoid	8.5/10
Game Informer	7.75/10
GameSpot	8/10
GamesRadar+	3.5/5
IGN	8.7/10
Metro	6/10
USgamer	4/5

Alienation was met with positive reviews from video-game critics upon release. It received a score of 79 out of 100 on the review aggregator website Metacritic, indicating "generally favorable reviews". Many reviewers praised the game's twin-stick mechanics, with Jordan Devore of the video-game blog Destructoid calling it "one of the best-feeling twin-stick shooters" he had ever played. Matt Miller wrote for the video-game magazine Game Informer that in multiplayer mode, Alienation had some of the best twin-stick shooting gameplay available. According to Ben Tyrer of GamesRadar, although the game's maps might not be memorable, its twin-stick shooting mechanics and design were.

Its cooperative gameplay was preferred by critics over single-player mode, but critics were confused by the game's lack of local co-op. On GameSpot, a video-game news website, Jason D'Aprile praised Alienation's cooperative gameplay but was frustrated by the lack of a local mode, though he said that "with a full troop online" the game was "easily one of the best all-out action multiplayer games in recent memory". In David Jenkins' review for the British news site Metro, the co-op was "fun no matter what". On USgamer, Jaz Rignall was puzzled about it not being a feature when the game was released, saying that it would be the "perfect game for couch co-op". Although GamesRadar's Ben Tyrer enjoyed the game, he also believed that it would benefit from having a "tense, pad-crushing, couch co-op" feature. Game Informer's Matt Miller preferred its cooperative gameplay over single-player.

The game's lack of variety in regard to weapons and ammunition was cited by reviewers. According to IGN's Vince Ingenito, Alienation did not have enough weapons and was disappointed that many of the weapons looked and behaved the same way. Destructoid's Jordan Devore wrote that even with upgrades enabled, the game had few weapons available. Matt Miller was frustrated by repeatedly running out of ammunition; although the game's upgrade system was interesting, its lack of ammunition (which he described as being "tediously small ammo clips") hampered enjoyment.

Reviewers had other issues with Alienation. GameSpot's Jason D'Aprile was annoyed by his inability to pause the game even in single-player mode. Although Metro's David Jenkins found its creatures' design "uninspired", the game's overall graphics were decent. According to gamesTM reviewers, Housemarque did not do a good job of combining two gameplay elements—the incremental loot system (accomplished through grinding) and the gameplay mechanic in which players repeat stages to increase scores—resulting in a "gameplay cycle that doesn't match the purity or compulsion of either".
