= PlayStation Experience =

Annual event for the video game industry

- Status: Defunct
- Genre: Video games
- Venue: Varies
- Location: Varies
- Country: United States
- Inaugurated: December 6, 2014; 11 years ago
- Most recent: August 19, 2018; 8 years ago
- Organizer: Sony Interactive Entertainment

PlayStation Experience, also known as PSX, was an annual event for the video game industry presented by Sony Interactive Entertainment used to reveal and advertise PlayStation games and game-related merchandise. The event was open to the public and showcases various panels and many unreleased games, with playable demos.

== England ==
=== 2002 ===
The first PlayStation Experience was held alongside the European Computer Trade Show at the Earls Court Exhibition Centre in August 2002. Over 20,000 people attended over the three days.

- Activision
  - Blade II
  - X-Men: Next Dimension
  - Rally Fusion: Race of Champions
- Activision O2
  - Kelly Slater's Pro Surfer
  - Tony Hawk's Pro Skater 4
  - Mat Hoffman's Pro BMX 2
- Capcom
  - Auto Modellista
  - Marvel vs. Capcom 2
  - Onimusha 2
  - GioGio's Bizarre Adventure
  - UFC: Throwdown
- Codemasters
  - Colin McRae Rally 3
  - Pro Race Driver
- Eidos Interactive
  - Tomb Raider: Angel of Darkness
- Midway Games
  - Haven: Call of the King
  - NHL Hitz 2003
  - Defender
  - Mortal Kombat: Deadly Alliance
- Namco
  - Tekken 4
  - Alpine Racer III
- Rage Software
  - Rocky
  - Rolling
  - Twin Caliber
- Sony Computer Entertainment
  - The Getaway
  - Primal
  - Formula One 2002
  - Hardware: Online Arena
  - World Rally Championship
  - GT Concept
  - This is Football 2003
  - SOCOM U.S. Navy SEALs
  - The Mark of Kri
  - Ratchet & Clank
  - Sly Cooper and the Thievius Raccoonus
  - Kingdom Hearts
  - Treasure Planet
  - Ape Escape 2
- THQ
  - WWE SmackDown! Shut Your Mouth
  - Hot Wheels Velocity X
  - MX Superfly
  - Red Faction II
  - Summoner 2
- Ubi Soft
  - Tom Clancy's Ghost Recon

=== 2003 ===
The second PlayStation Experience took place at the Earls Court Exhibition Centre as part of London Games Week, from August 28–31, 2003.

- Acclaim Entertainment
  - Alias
  - Gladiator: Sword of Vengeance
  - NBA Jam
  - Urban Freestyle Soccer
- Atari
  - Asterix 5
  - Beyblade
  - Dragon Ball Z: Budokai 2
  - Kya: Dark Lineage
  - Terminator 3: Rise of the Machines
  - Unlimited Saga
- Codemasters
  - Arsenal Club Football
  - Chelsea Club Football
  - Colin McRae Rally 04
  - Liverpool Club Football
  - Manchester United Football
  - Pop Idol
- Eidos Interactive
  - Backyard Wrestling: Don't Try This at Home
  - Legacy of Kain: Defiance
  - The Italing Job
  - Whiplash
- Electronic Arts
  - 007: Everything or Nothing
  - FIFA 2004
  - Harry Potter Quidditch World Cup
  - The Lord of the Rings: The Return of the King
  - Medal of Honor: Rising Sun
  - Need for Speed: Underground
  - SSX 3
- Konami
  - Castlevania: Lament of Innocence
  - Dance Stage Fever
  - Karaoke Revolution
  - Metal Gear Solid 3: Snake Eater
  - Pro Evolution Soccer 3
  - Teenage Mutant Ninja Turtles
- Midway Games
  - Freaky Flyers
  - Freestyle MetalX
  - Mortal Kombat: Deadly Alliance
  - NHL Hitz Pro
  - RoadKill
  - Spy Hunter
  - The Suffering
- Sony Computer Entertainment
  - Amplitude
  - Dark Chronicle
  - Destruction Derby Arenas
  - Dog's Tale
  - EverQuest Online Adventures
  - Football 2004
  - Ghost Hunter
  - Gran Turismo 4
  - Jak and Daxter II: Renegade
  - My Street
  - SOCOM II U.S. Navy SEALs
  - Time Crisis 3
  - WRC 3
- THQ
  - Broken Sword: The Sleeping Dragon
  - Finding Nemo
  - Sphinx: Shadow of Set
  - Tak and the Power of Juju
  - Warhammer 40,000: Fire Warrior
  - WWE SmackDown! Here Comes the Pain
- Ubi Soft
  - Batman 2
  - Beyond Good and Evil
  - Charlie's Angels
  - Crouching Tiger, Hidden Dragon
  - Prince of Persia: The Sands of Time
  - XIII
- Vivendi
  - Buffy the Vampire Slayer: Chaos Bleeds
  - Crash Nitro Kart
  - Judge Dredd: Dredd vs. Death
  - Metal Arms: Glitch in the System
  - The Simpsons: Hit and Run
  - The Hobbit

== North America ==
=== 2014 ===
PlayStation Experience returned in the United States, at Sands Expo in Las Vegas, Nevada from December 6–7, 2014, marking the 20th anniversary of the PlayStation.

- Activision
  - Destiny: The Dark Below (PS3 / PS4)
- Atlus
  - Persona 5 (PS4)
- Capybara Games
  - Super Time Force Ultra (PS4 / PSVita)
- DrinkBox Studios
  - Severed (PSVita)
- Double Eleven Limited
  - PixelJunk Nom Nom Galaxy (PS4)
- Double Fine Productions
  - Broken Age (PS4 / PSVita)
  - Day of the Tentacle (PS4 / PSVita)
  - Grim Fandango: Remastered (PS4 / PSVita)
  - Gang Beasts (PS4)
- Endnight Games
  - The Forest (PS4)
- Capcom
  - Ultra Street Fighter IV (PS4)
  - Street Fighter V (PC / PS4)
  - Resident Evil: Revelations 2 (PS4 / PSVita)
- Hello Games
  - No Man's Sky (PS4)
- Konami
  - Suikoden (PSVita)
  - Suikoden II (PSVita)
- Red Hook Studios
  - Darkest Dungeon (PS4 / PSVita)
- Robot Entertainment
  - Orcs Must Die! Unchained (PS4)
- Sega
  - Yakuza 5 (PS3)
- Sony Computer Entertainment
  - Bloodborne (PS4)
  - Drawn to Death (PS4)
  - Fat Princess Adventures (PS4)
  - Kill Strain (PS4)
  - MLB 15: The Show (PS3 / PS4 / PSVita)
  - The Order: 1886 (PS4)
  - Tearaway Unfolded (PS4)
  - TowerFall Ascension (PS4 / PSVita)
  - Uncharted 4: A Thief's End (PS4)
  - Wattam (PS4)
  - What Remains of Edith Finch (PS4)
- Square Enix
  - Final Fantasy VII (PS4)
- Tripwire Interactive
  - Killing Floor 2 (PS4)
- Versus Evil
  - The Banner Saga (PSVita)
- Warner Bros. Interactive Entertainment
  - Bastion (PS4 / PSVita)
  - Batman: Arkham Knight (PS4)
- Yacht Club Games
  - Shovel Knight (PS3 / PS4 / PSVita)
- Young Horses
  - Octodad: Dadliest Catch (PS4 / PSVita)

=== 2015 ===
The second PlayStation Experience event was held at Moscone Center in San Francisco, California from December 5–6, 2015.

- Activision

v* Destiny (PS3 / PS4)

- Bandai Namco Entertainment
  - Ace Combat 7 (PS4)
  - Ni no Kuni II: Revenant Kingdom (PS4)
- Capcom
  - Street Fighter V (PC / PS4)
- Double Fine Productions
  - Day of the Tentacle (PS4 / PSVita)
  - Full Throttle (PS4 / PSVita)
  - Psychonauts in the Rhombus of Ruin (PS4)
- Gearbox Software
  - Battleborn (PS4)
- Koei Tecmo
  - Nioh (PS4)
- Epic Games
  - Paragon (PC / PS4)
- No Goblin
  - 100ft Robot Golf (PS4)
- Owlchemy Labs
  - Job Simulator (PS4)
- Sega
  - Rez Infinite (PS4)
  - Yakuza 0 (PS4)
  - Yakuza 5 (PS3)
- Sony Computer Entertainment
  - MLB The Show 16 (PS3 / PS4)
  - Ratchet & Clank (PS4)
  - Uncharted 4: A Thief's End (PS4)
  - Zombie Taxi Game (PS4)
- Square Enix
  - Final Fantasy VII Remake (PS4)
  - Hitman Go (PS4 / PSVita)
- Ubisoft
  - Eagle Flight (PS4)

=== 2016 ===
The third PlayStation Experience event was held at Anaheim Convention Center in Anaheim, California from December 3–4, 2016.

- Activision
  - Destiny: Rise of Iron (PS4)
  - Call of Duty: Infinite Warfare (PS4)
  - Crash Bandicoot N. Sane Trilogy (PS4)
- Atlus
  - Persona 5 (PS4)
- Bandai Namco Entertainment
  - Ace Combat 7 (PS4)
  - Ni no Kuni II: Revenant Kingdom (PS4)
- Capcom
  - Marvel vs. Capcom: Infinite (PS4)
  - Resident Evil 7: Biohazard (PS4)
  - Street Fighter V (PS4)
  - Ultimate Marvel vs Capcom 3 (PS4)
- Devolver Digital
  - Absolver (PS4)
  - Mother Russia Bleeds (PS4)
  - Strafe (PS4)
- Double Fine Productions
  - Full Throttle Remastered (PS4)
- DotEmu
  - Windjammers (PS4 / PSVita)
  - Ys Origin (PS4 / PSVita)
- Grey Box
  - Dreadnought (PS4)
- GungHo Online Entertainment
  - Let It Die (PS4)
- Housemarque
  - Nex Machina (PS4)
- Koei Tecmo
  - Nioh (PS4)
- NIS America
  - Danganronpa V3: Killing Harmony (PS4 / PSVita)
- Sega
  - Hatsune Miku: Project DIVA Future Tone (PS4)
  - Sonic Mania (PS4)
  - Yakuza 6: The Song of Life (PS4)
  - Yakuza: Kiwami (PS4)
- Sony Interactive Entertainment
  - Death Stranding (PS4)
  - Gran Turismo Sport (PS4)
  - Gravity Rush 2 (PS4)
  - Horizon Zero Dawn (PS4)
  - Knack 2 (PS4)
  - LocoRoco (PS4)
  - MLB The Show 17 (PS4)
  - Parappa the Rapper (PS4)
  - Patapon (PS4)
  - The Last Guardian (PS4)
  - The Last of Us Part II (PS4)
  - Uncharted: The Lost Legacy (PS4)
  - Wipeout: Omega Collection (PS4)
- Supergiant Games
  - Pyre (PS4)
- Square Enix
  - Lara Croft Go (PS4 / PSVita)
  - Nier: Automata (PS4)

=== 2017 ===
The fourth PlayStation Experience event was held again at Anaheim Convention Center in Anaheim, California from December 9–10, 2017.

== South East Asia ==
=== 2017 ===
The first South East Asia PlayStation Experience event was held at KL Live in Kuala Lumpur, Malaysia from August 5, 2017.

- Bandai Namco Entertainment
  - Ni no Kuni II: Revenant Kingdom (PS4)
  - Taiko no Tatsujin: Drum Session! (PS4)
  - Dragonball FighterZ (PS4)
- Capcom
  - Marvel vs Capcom: Infinite (PS4)
- Electronic Arts
  - EA Sports FIFA 18 (PS4)
- Sony Interactive Entertainment
  - Bravo Team (PS4)
  - Everybody's Golf (PS4)
  - Detroit: Become Human (PS4)
  - Gran Turismo Sport (PS4)
  - Knack 2 (PS4)
  - Matterfall (PS4)
  - No Heroes Allowed! VR (PS4)
  - Stifled (PS4)
  - The Inpatient (PS4)
- Square Enix
  - Dissidia Final Fantasy NT (PS4)
  - Monster of the Deep: Final Fantasy XV (PS4)
- Ubisoft
  - Far Cry 5 (PS4)

=== 2018 ===
The second South East Asia PlayStation Experience event was held at GMM Live House in Bangkok, Thailand between August 18–19, 2018.

- Activision
  - Spyro Reignited Trilogy (PS4)
  - Sekiro: Shadows Die Twice (PS4)
- Bandai Namco
  - Jump Force (PS4)
  - Naruto to Boruto Shinobi Striker (PS4)
  - Soulcalibur VI (PS4)
- Capcom
  - Mega Man 11 (PS4)
  - Resident Evil 2 (PS4)
- Electronic Arts
  - FIFA 19
- Enhance, Inc
  - Tetris Effect (PS4 / PS VR)
- Epic Games
  - Fortnite (PS4)
- Koei Tecmo
  - Dead or Alive 6 (PS4)
- SEGA
  - Sonic Mania Plus (PS4)
- Sony Interactive Entertainment
  - Astro Bot Rescue Mission (PS4 / PS VR)
  - Blood & Truth (PS4 / PS VR)
  - Firewall Zero Hour (PS4 / PS VR)
  - Frantics (PS4)
  - Marvel's Spider-Man (PS4)
- Square Enix
  - Dragon Quest XI: Echoes of an Elusive Age (PS4)
  - Kingdom Hearts III (PS4)
  - Shadow of the Tomb Raider (PS4)
- Warner Bros. Interactive Entertainment
  - Lego DC Super-Villains
