= Alien Incident =

1996 video game

- European cover art
- Developer: Housemarque
- Publisher: GameTek
- Platform: MS-DOS
- Release: 1996
- Genre: Graphic adventure
- Mode: Single-player

Alien Incident (Finnish: Muukalaisten yö, lit. 'Night of the Aliens') is a 1996 point-and-click graphic adventure game. It was developed by Finnish game developer Housemarque and published by GameTek for MS-DOS.

== Plot ==
On Halloween, Benjamin Richards is at his uncle's mansion to bear witness to his newest invention, the "Worm Hole Spawner". Upon activation, a wormhole brings an alien spaceship into the Solar System. The aliens kidnap Benjamin's uncle, whom the player must rescue in addition to stopping the alien threat.

== Development ==
The game was initially developed by Bloodhouse (before the company merged with Terramarque to form Housemarque) and it was known during development as Leokadia. In January 1994 a six-person team had developed the game for nine months and it was due for release in Fall 1994 for PC and later for Amiga 1200. The game came out in 1996 for PC and the Amiga 1200 version was cancelled.

== Reception ==
Reception

Review score
Publication	Score
PC Gamer	73%

Pelit gave the game 92 out of 100.
