= Knack II =

2017 video game

- North American cover art
- Developer: Japan Studio
- Publisher: Sony Interactive Entertainment
- Director: Takamitsu Iijima
- Producers: Yusuke Watanabe; Sho Numakura
- Programmer: Tsuyoshi Murakami
- Artist: Yoshiaki Yamaguchi
- Writers: Marianne Krawczyk; Mark Cerny
- Composer: Anthony Willis
- Series: Knack
- Platform: PlayStation 4
- Release: NA: 5 September 2017; PAL: 6 September 2017; JP: 28 September 2017
- Genres: Beat 'em up, platform
- Modes: Single-player, multiplayer

Knack II (Note: Known as KNACK Two Heroes and the Ancient Corps (KNACK ふたりの英雄と古代兵団, KNACK Futari no Eiyū to Kodai Heidan) in Japan) is a 2017 beat 'em up platform video game developed by Japan Studio and published by Sony Interactive Entertainment for the PlayStation 4. The game is the sequel to the 2013 game Knack and was released in September 2017. It received mixed reviews from critics, but was largely considered to be an improvement over its predecessor. In the game, the player controls the eponymous character Knack, whose abilities include changing size, punching, and kicking. Knack II features a skill tree system and introduces offline multiplayer, allowing the game to be played cooperatively. The plot follows Knack and his companions as they investigate a threat from the High-Goblins and their Ancient Weapons.

== Gameplay ==
In Knack II, the player controls the eponymous character Knack. Knack's abilities include punching, kicking, changing size, and deflecting projectiles using a shield. The game features a skill tree system where players can upgrade Knack's abilities by collecting Relic Energy found in levels. There are treasure chests throughout the game that dispense a Relic or a Crystal Part to further upgrade Knack. The game can also be played cooperatively. Knack II introduces offline multiplayer, allowing an extra player to join and leave the main story at their leisure. This accessibility of Knack II allows people of varying ages to play and has been praised due to the couch cooperative play dynamic. Knack II also utilizes Quick-Time Events during cutscenes. There are puzzles that require the player to manipulate the world and Knack's abilities to progress. Knack II also introduces the teleporter, allowing players to teleport between pads within their respective levels. As the player progresses in the game, Knack acquires special abilities for Knack that also alter his appearance. These in-story abilities are Iron, Ice, and Stealth. The other special abilities that Knack can use are unlocked through the use of upgrading Knack with Knack parts, Relics, and Crystal Parts.

== Synopsis ==
=== Setting ===
Two centuries prior to the events of Knack II, known as the time of The Crystal Wars, the advanced civilization of the Goblins, known then as the High-Goblins, feuded with humans and sought after energy-potent crystals, which were found only on human territory. Yurick, a High Goblin leader and master engineer, created the Ancient Weapons, an army of powerful robots, to eradicate the humans. The High Goblin empire expanded as they continued their onslaught, until the human leader and warrior Marius and his troops began to defeat the Ancient Weapons in a single day with the use of rock, vines, traps, and cunningness, propelling their continuous victories over the course of the war.

Once defeated, Yurick returned to his laboratory to create a control center to command his robot forces as well as more powerful weapons, most notably the Titans, for their final battle against Marius and the humans. While Marius and Yurick fought with their armies, Marius had sent a strike team while they were preoccupied, disabling the Ancient Weapon's control center and defeating the High Goblins.

Marius and his men lamented defeating the High-Goblins, becoming the very thing they wished to stop. He then found the order of the monks and led people to a new era of peace and wisdom.

=== Plot ===
After an unspecified number of years since the events of Knack, Newhaven is under attack by four Titans. Lucas indicates that this was his undoing and Knack fights to help correct their unknown wrong-doings. Six months earlier, Lucas is flying with his uncle Ryder and Knack to an island, through a Goblin infested forest, and uncover a monument dedicated to Marius during the Crystal Wars. As they continue, they find a battlefield from the Crystal War, desecrated with the bodies of the vanguards of the Goblin Army. As they linger around, the army rises from the dead and attack the group. Knack protects them and they escape back the plane, making their way back to Doctor Vargas and Charlotte at a monastery in Norcliff to recount their experience. They all gather at the monastery and meet with two monks, Xander, their overseer, and Ava, their youth leader, and decide to seek a mountain pass in the morning to uncover Ancient Weapons in the area.

Morning arrives when the group part ways at the mountain pass and find a burned downed ruins of a village, unable to uncover the mystery. The group then returns to Doctor Vargas, Charlotte, and Xander while they attempt to reach a conclusion, Lucas and Ava decide to ask Uncle Ryder to help them reach Targun, the High Goblin City, where Yurick originally created these robots. They arrive at Targun Ruins and traverse within the walls of the city to find Yurick's laboratory. Once broken in, they discover part of a map to the High Goblin empire, a remote for controlling the robots, and decide to travel to a museum in Atheneum to better understand Targun's control center for their Ancient Weapons.

The group reach Atheneum's museum, finding that the city has been invaded by robots and Goblins. Knack brings an artifact to the group, taken from a commander. They suspect that the control center may be on a map that Uncle Ryder acquired and manage to pinpoint where it may be. Xander and Doctor Vargas urge Lucas about the importance of the artifact and debate about what should be done with it.

The group reaches the area on the map and uncover the control center's whereabouts, finding a High-Goblin city. Knack then faces the commander, but Gundahar speaks through a communicator to Knack about his anger towards him and to find the control room for their confrontation. They all return to the monastery to discuss their next course of action.

Lucas deduces that the control center is across the ocean based on their encounters with the High-Goblins. They manage to find a lone island and encounter the control center, disabling the power supply. They battle their way to Gundahar and he is tossed off a cliff. Xander then makes his way to meet with Lucas and reveals his plan of using the artifact in the control center, using the Ancient Weapons for his own purposes. Lucas and Knack remain marooned on the island for five months and two weeks after losing to Xander, devising a plan to get off the island by recovering robots parts to create an aircraft. They arrive at the Doctor's Mansion and rescue Doctor Vargas, Uncle Ryder, and Charlotte. Doctor Vargas informs Lucas and Knack that Xander has been attacking the city and Ava has been leading these attacks. They invaded to Katrina's Fortress, Uncle Ryder's ex-girlfriend, who owns a security firm and a private army, to recruit her assistance in combating Xander's forces. Knack convinces Katrina to use her robot army to battle Xander's army.

Lucas and Knack sneak beneath Norcliff to begin their infiltration against Xander with Katrina's army outside the gates. Ava then assists Knack in gaining further entrance in Xander's facility when she finds out that Xander has been using the Ancient Weapons. Knack and gang follow Xander to the Nexus, an ancient High-Goblin island. Xander uses the artifact to energize the machine on the island to make the robots and Titans stronger.

Lucas and Knack then follow Xander to Newhaven to fight his army. Knack destroys the Titans that Xander commandeered, only for Xander to use the artifact, rendering Knack weak and captured. Three months later, Knack is in Xander's Prison below the monastery, and is rescued by Lucas; who recounts that Ava and Lucas had split up to find Knack and that everyone had slowly started disappearing. Xander has created The Armageddon Machine to revert humanity to a more primitive time through destruction with the use of the artifact. Lucas and Knack enter the Armageddon Machine with the help of Ava and other monks, then she goes to evacuate Newhaven. Lucas upgraded his plane to withstand the Armageddon Machine's ray and to fire back stronger. Knack then takes the artifact and Xander before the Machine collapses. Xander then activates the artifact to create a massive Knack-like monster before he perishes. They fight and Knack destroys the artifact, restoring peace. The chairwomen of Newhaven signs a treaty with the monks and throw a celebration in everyone's victory. Ava and Lucas reconcile, Uncle Ryder takes Lucas aside to help in rekindling his relationship with Katrina, and Knack and Lucas then leave to venture towards new adventures.

== Development and release ==
Knack II was announced on 3 December 2016, at the PlayStation Experience event. The game was developed by Japan Studio. Marianne Krawczyk, a writer of the God of War series of video games, joined the development team to write the story script of Knack II. The game was released in September 2017. A free demo was released on 29 August 2017 on the PlayStation store, allowing players to try out the Monastery level, either solo or cooperatively.

== Reception ==
Reception

Aggregate score
| Aggregator | Score |
|---|---|
| Metacritic | 69/100 |

Review scores
| Publication | Score |
|---|---|
| Destructoid | 5.5/10 |
| Electronic Gaming Monthly | 8/10 |
| Game Informer | 8.25/10 |
| GameSpot | 7/10 |
| GamesRadar+ | 3/5 |
| IGN | 7.2/10 |
| Polygon | 7.5/10 |
| VideoGamer.com | 5/10 |

=== Critical reception ===
During Sony's pre-release showcase of the game, Knack II was boasted due to its art direction, cooperative integration, and focus on platforming.

Knack II received "mixed or average" reviews from critics, according to review aggregator website Metacritic. The game was largely considered to be an improvement over its predecessor.

Knack II has become a recurring joke on popular YouTuber videogamedunkey's channel; despite the mixed reaction from critics, he satirically refers to the game as a "masterpiece" and gave the game a rating of 10/5. He specifically praised the ability to play as Ice Knack and praised the game's graphics.

=== Sales ===
In Japan, Knack II did not rank in the Media Create Top 20 or Famitsu Top 30 sales charts upon release. Dengeki reported that the title sold 2,106 units to chart as the 35th best selling title in its debut. Comparatively, due to being included as a pack-in game with all initial PlayStation 4 consoles sold in the country, the original game moved 316,787 units in its first week.
