= Super Stardust =

1994 video game

- CD32 box art
- Developer(s): Bloodhouse; Housemarque (MS-DOS)
- Publisher(s): Team17; GameTek (MS-DOS)
- Series: Stardust
- Platform(s): Amiga, CD32, MS-DOS
- Release: Amiga; 1994; CD32: EU: 1995; MS-DOS; 1996
- Genre(s): Multidirectional shooter
- Mode(s): Single-player, multiplayer

Super Stardust is a multidirectional shooter video game developed by Bloodhouse and published by Team 17 for the Amiga (AGA) in 1994 and CD32 in 1995. The game was ranked the 26th best game of all time by Amiga Power.

The CD32 version featured CD-DA soundtracks composed by Nicklas Renqvist and Niko Nyman (Slusnik Luna). The game was ported to PC under the name Super Stardust '96. Super Stardust is a sequel to Stardust. An enhanced remake, entitled Super Stardust HD, was released in 2007 for the PlayStation 3 and in 2008 for the PlayStation Portable and is available to download from the European and US PlayStation Store. The next sequel, Super Stardust Delta, was released for the PlayStation Vita.

== Reception ==
A Next Generation reviewer gave it one out of five stars, chiefly criticizing its nature as an Asteroids clone, but gave positive remarks regarding its graphics, music, and the power-ups.

Amiga Format rated the game 90%, praising its graphics and gameplay.
