= Furmins =

2012 video game

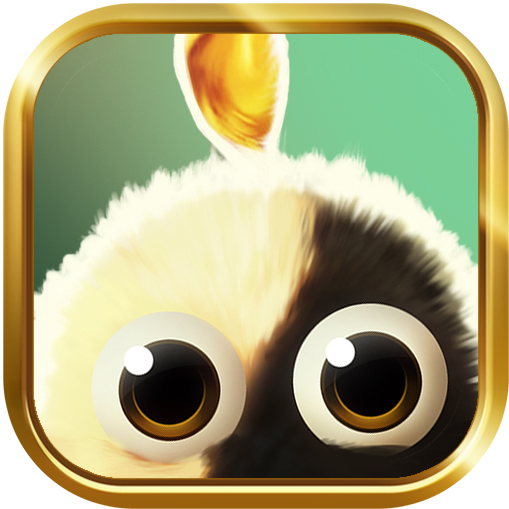
- App logo
- Developer: Housemarque
- Publisher: Housemarque
- Producer: Sami Koistinen
- Artist: Mikko Eerola
- Composer: Peter Hajba
- Platforms: iOS, PlayStation Vita
- Release: iOS; February 2, 2012; PlayStation Vita: EU: October 16, 2013; AU: October 30, 2013; NA: December 17, 2013
- Genre: Puzzle-platform
- Mode: Single-player

Furmins is a physics-based puzzle-platform game released for iOS in 2012 and later ported to the PlayStation Vita in 2013.

== Gameplay ==
Furmins is a blend of physics-based "set-up-and-go" gameplay and real-time interaction. To complete each level, the player is required to herd the Furmins from the level's starting point to its end point —in this case, a basket. This is accomplished by solving a puzzle which incorporates physical chain reactions between various items and the Furmins.

Solving each puzzle is a two-step process: 1) "Setup Mode": the player strategically places items in order to create pathways and physical reactions between the Furmins and the items. The goal is to arrange the items in such a way that all of the Furmins arrive safely in the basket. 2) "Action Mode": when the player is satisfied with the setup, they engage "Action Mode", in which the physics are turned on and the Furmins and the level items interact. In addition to watching the results of their setup, the player can interact in real-time with the moving items and the Furmins via well-timed usage of bumpers and conveyor belts. A successful solution to a puzzle sees all of the Furmins reach the basket, at which point the level is passed.

Iteration in both Setup Mode and Action Mode is rapid. Players can manipulate and customize each game level in Setup Mode, and can soon see if their solution worked once Action Mode is engaged. Also, there are multiple solutions to each level, providing a significant amount of creative flexibility for players.

== Plot ==
Furmins tells the story of its titular main characters, a cuddly race of creatures living a happy, peaceful existence until one day when their benevolent King falls asleep and rolls over a river, thus forming an impromptu dam and blocking the flow of water. Without water from the river the Furmins' existence is threatened, and so they embark on a quest to reach their King and wake him up. The object of the game is to navigate the Furmins through eight different worlds composed of 36 levels and get them to the King.

== Development ==
Furmins is developed by Finnish video game developer Housemarque. It was released in the Apple Store during Q1 2012. It is the developer's first iOS game. Furmins is available in two versions: an iPhone/iPod-only version and a universal version, suitable both for iPhone/iPod and iPad. Housemarque updated Furmins regularly.

== Reception ==
Reception

Aggregate score
Aggregator	Score
Metacritic	iOS: 76% (7 reviews)

Review scores
Publication	Score
4Gamers	8/10
148Apps	4.5/5
TouchGen	3.5/5
Consol.AT	4.5/5
Consolplus	4.5/5
Fanbolt	5/5

Furmins has received generally favorable reviews and has been praised for its hand painted backgrounds and soundtrack.
