= Golf: Tee It Up! =

2008 video game

- Developer: Housemarque
- Publisher: Activision
- Platform: Xbox 360
- Release: July 9, 2008
- Genre: Sports
- Modes: Single-player, multiplayer

Golf: Tee It Up! is a 2008 golf video game developed by Housemarque and published by Activision for the Xbox 360, released as a downloadable title.

== Gameplay ==
Golf: Tee It Up! has simple game mechanics designed for approachable, fun and short games. The two joysticks allow for aiming while the distance the ball is hit and accuracy are controlled by three presses of a single button. The other major control mechanic is called focus. This allows players to boost your maximum distance or even alter the flight of the ball mid-flight to hit that perfect spot.

Golf: Tee It Up! gameplay

Players can play online with Xbox Live. The game is relatively short with only three total playable courses. Two 18-hole courses are included with Golf: Tee It Up!: Caribbean, which is the easier of the two and based on any number of tropical resorts, and Parkland, which is very loosely based on St Andrews Links, including stone ruins and obstacles. On September 3, 2008, a third course, Desert Course, became available on Xbox Live as downloadable content.

== Reception ==
Reception

Aggregate score
Aggregator	Score
Metacritic	69/100

Review scores
Publication	Score
1Up.com	C−
Eurogamer	7/10
GamePro	4.5/5
GamesMaster	72%
GameSpot	7/10
IGN	8.2/10
Official Xbox Magazine (UK)	6/10
Official Xbox Magazine (US)	6.5/10
TeamXbox	7.4/10
411Mania	8.5/10

The game received "average" reviews according to the review aggregation website Metacritic. Most critics praised its fun and good looks for an arcade game but wanted a longer game and disliked the quirky ball physics.
