= Criticism of Sony =

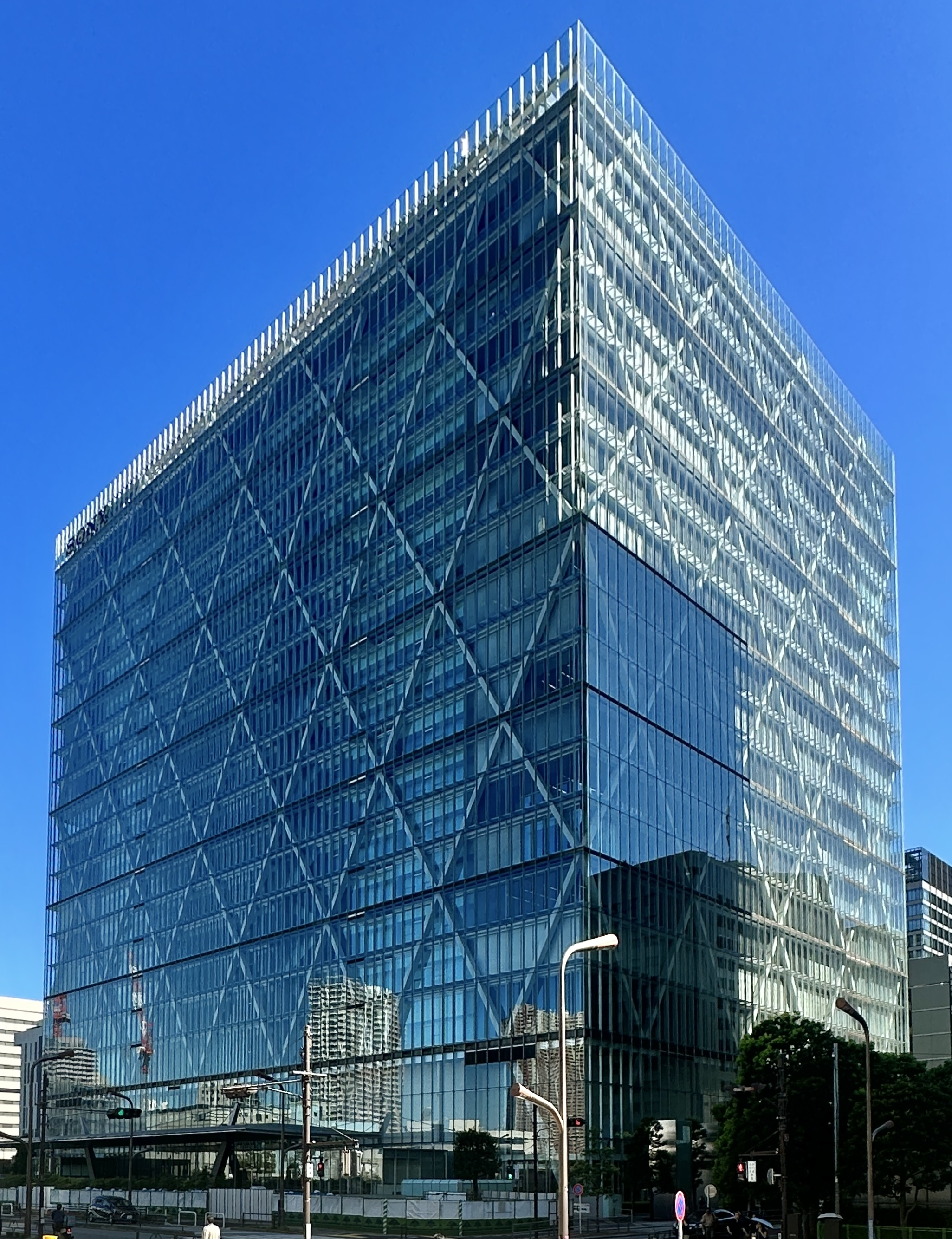
Sony Group Corporation headquarters at Sony City, Minato, Tokyo

Over the years, Sony Group Corporation and its subsidiaries has been the subject of public criticism, regulatory scrutiny and legal action.

This includes controversies surrounding its digital rights management strategies, antitrust and regulatory investigations, corporate surveillance activities, market practices, environmental policies, cybersecurity incidents, the management and distribution of digital and physical media and relations with industry partners and creative collaborators.

== Electronics ==
=== Price fixing ===
In 2007 an investigation launched in 2002 by the European Commission culminated in Sony, Fuji and Maxell receiving a total of 110 million US dollar fine for fixing professional videotape prices between 1999 and 2002 through regular meetings and other illegal contracts; at the time the three corporations shared a combined 85% control of the market.

Sony's part of the fine was raised by a third for trying to obstruct the investigation by refusing to answer inquiries made by the EU officials and shredding of evidence during the multiple law-enforcement raids. During the year 2001 prior to the investigation Sony sold professional videotapes for a total of €115 million inside the EU.

=== Environmental record ===
In November 2011, Sony was ranked ninth (jointly with Panasonic) in Greenpeace's Guide to Greener Electronics. This chart grades major electronics companies on their environmental work. The company scored 3.6/10, incurring a penalty point for comments it has made in opposition to energy efficiency standards in California. It also risks a further penalty point in future editions for being a member of trade associations that have commented against energy efficiency standards. Together with Philips, Sony receives the highest score for energy policy advocacy after calling on the EU to adopt an unconditional 30% reduction target for greenhouse gas emissions by 2020. Meanwhile, it receives full marks for the efficiency of its products. In June 2007, Sony ranked 14th on the Greenpeace guide. Sony fell from its earlier 11th-place ranking due to Greenpeace's claims that Sony had double standards in its waste policies.

As of May 2018 Greenpeace's 2017 Guide to Greener Electronics rated Sony approximately in the middle among electronics manufacturers with a grade of D+.

Since 1976, Sony has had an Environmental Conference. Sony's policies address its effects on global warming, the environment, and resources. They are taking steps to reduce the amount of greenhouse gases that it puts out as well as regulating the products it gets from its suppliers in a process that it calls "green procurement". Sony has said that it has signed on to have about 75 percent of its Sony Building running on geothermal power. The "Sony Take Back Recycling Program" allow consumers to recycle the electronics products that they buy from Sony by taking them to eCycle (Recycling) drop-off points around the U.S. The company has also developed a biobattery that runs on sugars and carbohydrates that works similarly to the way living creatures work. This is the most powerful small biobattery to date.

In 2000, Sony faced criticism for a document entitled "NGO Strategy" that was leaked to the press. The document involved the company's surveillance of environmental activists in an attempt to plan how to counter their movements. It specifically mentioned environmental groups that were trying to pass laws that held electronics-producing companies responsible for the cleanup of the toxic chemicals contained in its merchandise.

=== Smart TVs and customer surveillance ===
In December 2025, Texas Attorney General Ken Paxton filed a lawsuit against Sony and four other smart TV manufacturers, alleging that the companies were illegally "spying on Texans by secretly recording what consumers watch in their own homes" using automated content recognition (ACR) technology.

== Sony Interactive Entertainment ==
=== PlayStation Network hack ===
In April 2011, Sony experienced one of the largest security breaches in internet history when hackers compromised its PlayStation Network and Qriocity services. The intrusion exposed the personal identification data of approximately 77 million registered user accounts globally, including customer names, physical billing addresses, email addresses, login credentials, purchase histories and potentially unencrypted credit card details.

As a result of the incident, Sony completely shut down the PlayStation Network for 24 days, leaving millions of console owners unable to access online multiplayer gaming, digital storefronts or connected media applications while engineers rebuilt the platform's security infrastructure.

The company faced severe public, media, and governmental condemnation over its handling of the incident, particularly regarding its delay in notifying affected users. Sony waited nearly a week after discovering the intrusion before publicly disclosing that sensitive personal and financial data had been exfiltrated. The fallout led to international regulatory investigations, congressional inquiries in the United States, administrative fines from privacy enforcement agencies and a major class-action lawsuit that Sony ultimately settled by offering millions of dollars in free games, service credits, and identity theft protection coverage to affected customers.

=== Studio closures ===
In the early 2020s, Sony Interactive Entertainment sparked severe criticism over the closure of several key development studios and the elimination of nearly 1,000 global gaming jobs. Through a series of corporate restructurings, Sony liquidated long-standing internal divisions, shuttered newly acquired developers and canceled active projects, drawing widespread backlash from players and industry veterans alike.

In 2021, Sony reorganized and effectively dissolved Japan Studio, one of its oldest internal divisions responsible for acclaimed titles like Ape Escape, Gravity Rush, Shadow of the Colossus and The Last Guardian, ending decades of legacy development in Tokyo. Former PlayStation executive Shawn Layden later reflected on the shuttering, describing the closure as "like pruning a bonsai" to eliminate projects that lacked growth potential, while acknowledging the loss of the studio's eccentric creative legacy. Industry commentators, such as Inverse, criticized the move as one of Sony's "biggest mistakes".

In early 2024, Sony laid off approximately 900 employees across its global gaming workforce and completely shuttered London Studio, a 22-year-old development team known for pioneering virtual reality and experimental PlayStation hardware titles.

Later that year, Sony pulled the multiplayer hero shooter Concord offline, just two weeks after its August 2024 launch due to catastrophic commercial failure, permanently closing its developer, Firewalk Studios, shortly thereafter. During the same restructuring wave, Sony closed mobile developer Neon Koi before the studio could release its first game. Following the simultaneous closures of Firewalk Studios and Neon Koi in October 2024, the decisions drew sharp condemnation from labor organizations, including the Communications Workers of America (CWA). The union stated that the shutterings demonstrated how "highly-insulated video game CEOs are creating perilous working conditions for workers by eliminating their job security," while raising anti-competitive concerns over Sony's market dominance and its retreat from competing in the open mobile gaming space outside its proprietary PlayStation ecosystem.

=== Gran Turismo 7 review-bombing ===
Following its release in March 2022, Sony Interactive Entertainment and developer Polyphony Digital faced widespread backlash over the monetization and updates in Gran Turismo 7. Despite strong initial reviews, player backlash grew rapidly after Update 1.07 cut race payouts. This made expensive cars far harder to unlock without buying microtransactions, a feature that was turned on only after early reviews were published.

The issue got worse when Update 1.07 caused a 30-hour server outage. Because Gran Turismo 7 required an internet connection even for single-player modes, players could not use most of the game. In response, angry players review-bombed the game on Metacritic, dropping its user score to 2.0 out of 10, the lowest ever for a Sony-published title. Polyphony Digital CEO Kazunori Yamauchi later apologized, promising to raise rewards and giving affected players one million in-game credits.

=== Helldivers 2 review-bombing ===
In May 2024, Sony Interactive Entertainment sparked severe public backlash when it announced that PC players of the hit cooperative multiplayer shooter Helldivers 2 on Steam would be required to link their Steam accounts to a PlayStation Network account to continue playing. The announcement came three months after the game's initial launch. The policy decision immediately created a major geographic crisis because the PlayStation Network is officially available in only around 70 countries, leaving prospective players in over 170 countries and territories without legitimate access to PSN services. As a result, hundreds of thousands of PC players who had already purchased and played the game faced the sudden threat of being locked out entirely. Sony itself pulled Helldivers 2 from sale on Steam across all non-PSN supported regions, blocking new purchases across vast portions of the globe.

Players launched a massive "review bomb" campaign on Steam, submitting over 200,000 negative reviews within a few days and driving the game's recent review rating down to "Overwhelmingly Negative". Beyond storefront reviews, fans organized refund requests en masse, criticized Sony's corporate strategy on social media platforms and pointed out security concerns regarding mandatory PSN account creation following Sony's historical data breaches.

Faced with unprecedented pressure from players, widespread media coverage, and public opposition from the game's developer, Arrowhead Game Studios, Sony capitulated less than 72 hours after the initial announcement. The company issued an official statement on social media acknowledging the feedback and confirming that the mandatory account-linking update for Helldivers 2 would not move forward.

=== Removal of features and purchased content ===
System updates for Sony gaming consoles have occasionally removed previously advertised features or content. These removals were typically cited as measures to reduce licensing costs, enhance system security against modding, or adapt to expiring media distributions. In December 2023, Sony announced that it will remove the Discovery app and its content, even if previously paid for, from its gaming consoles.

Similarly, in 2026, Sony notified users in several European markets that over 550 movies and TV titles produced by Studiocanal would be deleted from PlayStation libraries without refunds, highlighting ongoing concerns regarding digital media ownership and licensing rights.

=== Dynamic pricing experiments ===
In early 2026, independent price-tracking platforms discovered that Sony was conducting unannounced dynamic A/B pricing tests across digital storefronts on the PlayStation Store. Data-mining of store API responses revealed experimental identifiers, such as IPT_PILOT and IPT_OPR_TESTING, showing that logged-in users within the same geographic region were being quoted differing prices and variable discount rates for identical digital titles. The algorithmically driven experiment spanned over 150 first- and third-party games, adjusting prices based on customer account data, historical purchasing habits and perceived price elasticity.

Consumer rights advocacy groups and gaming journalists sharply criticized the practice over its lack of transparent disclosure, raising concerns regarding consumer manipulation, algorithmic discrimination, and deceptive trade practices.

=== Ending of physical game production ===
On July 1, 2026, Sony Interactive Entertainment announced that physical disc production will end for PlayStation games released after January 2028. The announcement resulted in intense backlash, with the announcement on X being viewed more than 180 million times. After the announcement, PlayStation did not post on social media for 6 days, and thousands of comments were left on every PlayStation and Sony social media post criticizing the decision, including new game releases.

The announcement will have an impact on the pre-owned video game market, which was one of the main selling points of the PlayStation 4. Players have also expressed concern that digital games are licenses that can be revoked at any time, and stated that this decision may impact their future choice of purchasing a console. The PlayStation Store is also only available in 69 countries, leaving a large part of the world cut off from being able to officially purchase digital games.

Along the ongoing criticism and controversy, a senior director and video game industry advisor Mat Piscatella in his July 20 post on Bluesky stated that only 7 PlayStation games sold more than 100,000 physical copies year-to-date. The exact titles were not specified, with speculation falling on 007 First Light and Resident Evil Requiem based on top global estimates.

During the Q1 2026 earnings Q&A, Sony CFO Lin Tao acknowledged the criticism and said that the decision was made due to various reasons, the most notable being the natural progression of digitalization, and that they would be cautiously moving forward with this.

=== Digital game ownership ===
In June 2026, four consumers filed a proposed class-action lawsuit against Sony Interactive Entertainment in the U.S. District Court for the Northern District of California, alleging that the company failed to properly disclose that purchasing downloadable games does not confer permanent ownership or access. The complaint claimed that transaction language such as "Buy Now" and "Confirm Purchase" on the PlayStation Store violates California's Assembly Bill 2426, a 2024 digital transparency statute that took effect in January 2025 requiring storefronts to explicitly state in plain language that purchasing a digital good grants only a license.

In an August 2026 court filing requesting dismissal, Sony defended its storefront practices by pointing to text in its hyperlinked PlayStation Terms of Service and Software Product License Agreement accessible near the checkout button. The company asserted that "reasonable consumers would not be misled" into expecting physical ownership rights over digital media, arguing that digital software inherently functions as a shared license rather than discrete physical property. To support its position, Sony contended that if an individual consumer truly owned a digital copy, the seller would be legally precluded from simultaneously selling access to the same title to other users.

Public scrutiny over digital retention was further compounded in July 2026 when media outlets highlighted a long-standing clause in the European PlayStation Network Terms of Service. Under these terms, Sony reserves the right to terminate accounts that remain inactive for 36 consecutive months following a six-month email notification period, a process that permanently revokes access to all tied digital purchases, unlike competitor policies such as Microsoft's which exempt accounts with active game purchases from inactivity deletion.

The ongoing controversy intensified in August 2026 when Sony issued email notifications directly to PlayStation users delivering updated Terms of Service. The communications explicitly reminded customers that software on the platform is "licensed, not sold," sparking significant online pushback from critics who argued the emails highlighted growing player frustration over digital game removals and platform control. Player communities criticized Sony's legal position, highlighting that shoppers routinely skip linked terms buried in checkout text.

The backlash represented another setback for Sony in a short period of time, coming shortly after public criticism over its plans to phase out physical game disc production.

=== Dispute with Hideo Kojima ===
In September 2026, Sony Interactive Entertainment faced backlash following the abrupt cancellation of its publishing agreement and funding for Physint, an action-espionage game created by Hideo Kojima and announced as an exclusive title during a January 2024 PlayStation presentation. Kojima publicly revealed that PlayStation Studios notified him of the termination during a mid-June 2026 video call without providing a clear explanation, expressing shock at the decision. Industry reports attributed the publisher's withdrawal to escalating development budgets, missed milestones and corporate restructuring following executive leadership changes at Sony Interactive Entertainment.

Following the termination, Kojima Productions partnered with Xbox Game Studios to continue development and secure publishing rights for the project. The decision provoked significant outrage among PlayStation fans and online gaming communities, who widely criticized Sony for severing ties with a long-time creative collaborator and allowing a high-profile flagship project to transition to a competitor platform.

In the following days, Kojima Productions publicly addressed reports concerning the reasons for the change in publishing partners. The studio disputed what it described as unsubstantiated speculation regarding its relationship with PlayStation, the commercial performance of the Death Stranding, and the production planning and investment for Physint. It stated that none of the claims had come from an official or on-the-record source, and reaffirmed that the studio was in a healthy and profitable state, that development of Physint was continuing with Xbox, and that its relationship with PlayStation remained strong.

== Sony Pictures Entertainment ==
=== Dispute with Warner Bros. ===
When Sony acquired Columbia Pictures Entertainment in September 1989 for $3.4 billion, it sought Hollywood production talent to manage the studio's operations. The company recruited producers Peter Guber and Jon Peters, offering them lucrative management contracts alongside a $200 million acquisition of their production outfit, Guber-Peters Entertainment Company.

However, Guber and Peters had recently signed an exclusive, multi-year production contract with Warner Bros.. Warner Bros. sued Sony for $1 billion over breach of contract to block the executives from leaving, arguing that Sony had unlawfully induced the pair to violate their existing agreement.

To resolve the legal dispute and secure the executives, Sony was forced to negotiate a massive settlement package estimated to be worth between $400 million and $600 million in concessions to Warner Bros. Under the settlement terms, Sony transferred a 50% ownership stake in its Columbia House direct-mail music and video business to Warner Bros., surrendered exclusive cable television distribution rights for Columbia's film catalog, and traded its interest in the shared Burbank Studios lot.

=== Fake movie reviews ===
In 2001, news broke that Sony Pictures Entertainment had fabricated a fictional film critic named "David Manning" and attributed fake reviews to him in print advertisements for several poorly received Columbia Pictures films, including A Knight's Tale and The Animal.

An investigation by Newsweek revealed that while The Ridgefield Press was a real publication, no one named David Manning had ever written for it and the quotes had been manufactured internally by Sony's marketing department. The exposure of the deception led to significant public embarrassment and corporate disciplinary action, with Sony suspending the executives responsible.

The scandal also triggered legal repercussions. In 2004, a class-action lawsuit was filed on behalf of filmgoers who had bought tickets based on the fraudulent endorsements. To resolve the litigation, Sony agreed to a $1.5 million settlement, offering $5 refunds to consumers who had attended screenings of the advertised movies. Additionally, the company paid $326,000 in fines and costs to the state of Connecticut for violating state consumer protection laws prohibiting deceptive trade practices.

=== North Korean cyberattack ===
In November 2014, Sony Pictures Entertainment suffered a massive cyberattack by a hacker group known as the "Guardians of Peace", which was later attributed by the FBI to North Korea. The attack was launched in response to the planned release of The Interview, a satirical film depicting the assassination of North Korean leader Kim Jong Un.

The hackers deployed destructive malware that wiped internal networks, leaked confidential corporate emails, employee personal data, and unreleased feature films, and threatened physical violence against movie theaters screening the film. Following pressure from cinema chains, government officials, and free speech advocates, Sony canceled the nationwide theatrical rollout and instead released the film through digital platforms and independent theaters.

== Sony Music ==
=== Dispute with Michael Jackson ===
In 2002, the pop artist Michael Jackson became involved in a public dispute with Sony Music Entertainment chairman Tommy Mottola over the promotion and commercial performance of his album Invincible. Jackson accused Sony of deliberately withholding support from the album and alleged that the record industry exploited artists, particularly Black artists. During a July 2002 appearance at the National Action Network in Harlem, Jackson described Mottola as "racist" and "very, very, very devilish", and claimed that Mottola had used a racial slur when referring to an unnamed Black artist. Jackson also called Mottola "the devil" during an earlier appearance in London and led a protest outside Sony's New York headquarters, where he displayed an image of Mottola with devil horns and called for his removal.

Sony Music rejected Jackson's accusations, describing them as "ludicrous, spiteful, and hurtful" and defending Mottola's record of working with Jackson and other artists. Reverend Al Sharpton, who had appeared alongside Jackson during the dispute, also subsequently distanced himself from the specific allegations against Mottola, saying that the broader issue of racial inequality in the music industry should be addressed separately.

The controversy contributed to the breakdown of Jackson's relationship with Sony Music. Sony did not renew Jackson's recording contract after its expiration, while Jackson continued to publicly criticize the company and Mottola.

=== Customer surveillance ===
In 2005, Sony's then half-owned music division, Sony BMG, implemented copy-protection software on music CDs that secretly installed rootkit software on users' computers without explicit consent. The software surveilled user listening habits, modified operating system security settings, and created severe vulnerabilities for malware exploitation.

Following public outcry, Sony released an uninstaller tool, however, the patch was found to collect additional user data while creating further security risks. The scandal resulted in multiple regulatory investigations, class-action lawsuits, product recalls, and financial settlements.

== See also ==
- Criticism of Microsoft
- Criticism of Apple Inc.
- Criticism of Google
- Criticism of Amazon
