= Hustle Kings =

2009 video game

- Developers: VooFoo Studios (PS3); XDev, EPOS Game Studios (PS Vita & PS4)
- Publisher: Sony Computer Entertainment
- Platforms: PlayStation 3, PlayStation Vita, PlayStation 4
- Release: PlayStation 3: EU: 22 December 2009; NA: 28 January 2010; PlayStation Vita: EU: 22 February 2012; NA: 22 February 2012; PlayStation 4: EU: 18 February 2015; NA: 9 June 2015
- Genre: Sports simulation (cue sports)
- Modes: Single-player, multiplayer

Hustle Kings is a pool video game developed by British company VooFoo Studios and published by Sony Computer Entertainment for the PlayStation 3. It was released on the PlayStation Store in Europe on 22 December 2009 and in North America on 28 January 2010. The game features a career mode as well as various trick shot and tournament modes. The game also features online play allowing the user to compete against other players over the PlayStation Network. Hustle Kings is also available for the PlayStation Vita portable gaming system.

Hustle Kings allows the user to play their external music from the PlayStation 3 hard drive during gameplay. It also utilises the PlayStation 3's implementation of the YouTube API, allowing users to record video of their gameplay and upload it to the video-sharing website from within the game. Hustle Kings has also been confirmed to support PlayStation Move as an input method.

On 11 August 2014, it was announced that Hustle Kings would be coming to the PlayStation 4 in the form of a free-to-play release. On 18 February 2015, Hustle Kings was released for the PlayStation 4 in Europe and in North America on 9 June 2015. A port of Hustle Kings titled 'Hustle Kings VR' was released with the PlayStation VR headset for the PlayStation 4 on 13 October 2016. The PS Vita and PS4 versions of the game are developed by XDev and EPOS Game Studios.

== Snooker Pack ==
The Hustle Kings: Snooker Pack add-on module was released 8 June 2010. The pack provided snooker as well as pool simulation, both single- and multi-player.
