= AllClear ID =

- Type: Private
- Founded: 2004
- Headquarters: Austin, Texas
- Key people: Bo Holland, Founder and CEO
- Website: www.AllClearID.com/business

AllClear ID (aka AllClear and formerly Debix) provides products and services meant to protect people and their personal information from threats related to identity theft. AllClear ID's main service providers include technology and customer service teams.

== Data breach response services ==
The breach response services from AllClear ID include notification, call center & customer support, and identity protection products. Notification provides access to identity protection services. The call center provides a team experienced in managing the anxiety of breach victims to answer questions about the incident, reassure individuals, and explain the identity protection services offered. Products are available to mitigate risk from different types of breaches including compromised credit cards, passwords, health information, and Social Security numbers. AllClear ID has worked with large companies to manage sensitive and highly visible breach responses including The Home Depot, P.F. Chang's, Michael's–Aaron Brothers, The UPS Store, Dairy Queen, Albertson's–SuperValu, and Anthem BCBS. This is an advertisement

== Child identity theft research ==
In April 2011 AllClear ID released a report with Richard Power, a distinguished fellow at Carnegie Mellon University CyLab, on the prevalence of child ID theft. Using the data supplied by AllClear ID, Power completed the largest report ever done on child identity theft. From the database of over 40,000 children, Power found that 4,311 had someone else using their Social Security numbers.

The Today Show led a follow-up investigation, interviewing victims of child identity theft. Investigators found some of the thieves who were still living and working using a child's Social Security number.

In July 2011, CEO Bo Holland, along with leaders from the Social Security Administration, Identity Theft 911, The Identity Theft Resource Center, and more, spoke at Stolen Futures, the FTC forum on Child Identity Theft. There he presented the findings from the CyLab report on child identity theft, as well as findings from follow up data sampling since the report release.

In May 2012, AllClear ID released a follow-up report on child ID theft data involving 27,000 minors. This report further confirmed the growing problem of child identity theft, indicating that children were targeted at a rate 35 times greater than that of adults

== Awards and recognition ==
- 2010 – Debix was recognized as an AlwaysOn Global 250 winner "signifying leadership amongst its peers and game-changing approaches and technologies that are likely to disrupt existing markets and entrenched players in the Global Silicon Valley".
- 2011 – AllClear ID Pro was ranked second overall, with Identity Guard placing first. (reference needed as old reference invalid) In the category of Restoration, AllClear ID tied for first alongside Identity Force and Royal.
- August 2011 – Awarded "Best in Resolution" by Javelin Strategy & Research.
- February 2012 – Awarded 5 Stevie Awards for Sales & Customer Service: Customer Service Department of the Year, Contact Center of the Year, Best Use of Technology in Customer Service, Front-Line Customer Service Professional of the Year (Investigator Christy McCarley), Customer Service Leader of the Year (VP of Customer Services & Chief Investigator Jamie May).
- February 2013 – Awarded 5 Stevie Awards for Customer Service: Contact Center of the Year, Best Use of Technology in Customer Service, Front-Line Customer Service Professional of the Year, Contact Center Manager of the Year, and Customer Service Department of the Year.
- February 2014 – Awarded 5 Stevie Awards for Customer Service: Young Customer Service Professional of the Year, Customer Service Department of the Year, Innovation in Customer Service, Contact Center of the Year, Customer Service Professional of the Year.

== History ==
- 2004: Founded by Bo Holland, originally named Debix, Inc. After working in the financial industry, Holland used his knowledge of how banks and institutions handled credit requests to create Debix's identity protection network. Holland was previously founder and CEO of Works, Inc., which was acquired by Bank of America in 2005. Works is an electronic payment solutions provider, and Holland invented the patent-pending technology that enables large organizations to approve and control payments for operating expenses via credit cards.
- April 2011: Carnegie Mellon CyLab and AllClear ID released "Child Identity Theft" research reporting that child identity theft is a faster-growing crime than adult identity theft.
- April 2011: Debix introduced AllClear ID, the first free identity theft protection service for families. AllClear ID offers a free service which monitors data for stolen personal information and provides free identity repair in addition to a premium product.
- May 2011: Partnered with Sony for PlayStation Network outage in April.
- In July 2011, Debix was granted U.S. Patent No. 7,983,979 for multi-band, multi-factor authentication design.
- July 2011: Bo Holland presents Child Identity Theft research to Federal Trade Commission.
- March 2012: Debix company name changed to AllClear ID, Inc.
- May 2012: Released "Child Identity Theft" research reporting "Criminals are targeting the youngest children. 15% of victims were five years old and younger, an increase of 105% over the 2011 findings".
- August 2014: AllClear ID Plus offered to victims of the Home Depot Credit Card breach of 2014.
- February 2015: AllClear ID Secure and Pro offered to victims of the Anthem Inc. data breach of 2015.
- January 2018: AllClear ID offered to victims of the Guaranteed Rate Data Security Breach of September 14, 2017.
- April 2018: AllClear ID offered to Delta Air Lines victims of the [24]7.ai data breach in September – October 2017.
- April 2018: Massachusetts State Tax Department/ Child Support Division exposed private data of 6,100 people due to an apparent coding error in the COMETS HD system by the company Accenture. The software vendor covers all cost of AllClear ID to the affected people for 24 months.
