= Housemarque =

Finnish video game developer

Housemarque Oy
- Logo used since 2008
- Type: Subsidiary
- Industry: Video games
- Predecessors: Bloodhouse; Terramarque
- Founded: 19 July 1995; 31 years ago
- Founders: Ilari Kuittinen; Harri Tikkanen
- Headquarters: Helsinki, Finland
- Key people: Sami Hakala (managing director); Harri Tikkanen (creative director)
- Number of employees: 110 (2023)
- Parent: PlayStation Studios (2021–present)
- Website: housemarque.com

Housemarque Oy (or Housemarque Inc.) is a Finnish video game developer based in Helsinki. The company was founded by Ilari Kuittinen and Harri Tikkanen in July 1995, through the merger of their previous video game companies, Bloodhouse and Terramarque, both of which were founded in 1993 as Finland's first commercial developers. Housemarque is the oldest active developer in Finland and has about 110 employees as of 2023. It was acquired by Sony Interactive Entertainment in June 2021, becoming a part of PlayStation Studios.

== History ==
=== Bloodhouse and Terramarque (1993–1994) ===
Bloodhouse and Terramarque were founded in 1993, becoming Finland's first commercial video game developers. Bloodhouse was led by Harri Tikkanen, and released its first game, Stardust in 1993, with a version updated for the Amiga 1200, titled Super Stardust, released the following year. Terramarque was founded by Ilari Kuittinen and Stavros Fasoulas, and hired Miha Rinne in 1994. Fasoulas, at the time, was working on a clone of Bubble Bobble titled Galactic, but failed to find a publisher, wherefore the game ended up on a covermount in British magazine The One. The first game from Terramarque was Elfmania, released in 1994 to mixed reception. The company started work on a second game, P.I.D. (short for Private Investigator Dollarally), to be published by Renegade Software. When the Amiga was discontinued mid-development, production on P.I.D. was halted; when Terramarque members discussed whether the game should be ported to PlayStation, Fasoulas decided not to and quit game programming. A demo of the game has been released, but the game itself was not finished.

=== Formation of Housemarque and initial games (1994–1997) ===
In December 1994, Kuittinen began working closely with Tikkanen, and their two companies formally merged in 1995 to form Housemarque. Housemarque Oy, the legal entity, was registered on 19 July 1995. Housemarque is the oldest active video game developer in Finland. Both Bloodhouse and Terramarque were developing games for personal computers (PCs) at the time, with the joint team deciding to focus specifically on the evolving PC gaming market. The company started out by freelancing, and after setting up their first office in the Punavuori area of Helsinki, started hiring employees and ceased freelance work. The first PC games developed by Housemarque were the MS-DOS conversion of Bloodhouse's space shooter Super Stardust (1996), adventure game Alien Incident (1996), and shooter game The Reap (1997), all of which gained favourable reception but failed to succeed commercially.

=== Expansion and acquisition by Sony (2014–present) ===
At the end of 1997, Housemarque had just 18 employees. In February 2014, Housemarque had over 50 employees. In November 2017, the company announced that it would be stepping away from the arcade genre, which it had incorporated in all of its games since Super Stardust, as it was not generating enough revenue to justify developing further games in the genre. The following April, it announced Stormdivers, a battle royale game, anticipating a 2019 release. In December 2018, Housemarque's staff count was approaching 70 people. Housemarque eventually put all of its in-development projects, including Stormdivers, on halt in January 2020. Instead, it shifted its focus on a project the company considered to be its most ambitious thus far and had been in pre-production for three years. At the time, Housemarque had close to 80 staff members.

At the PlayStation 5 reveal event in June 2020, Housemarque announced its first AAA title, Returnal. It was released for the PlayStation 5 in April 2021, with the game selling over 560,000 copies by July. Returnal's commercial performance and Housemarque's increased collaboration with Sony Interactive Entertainment for this game led the latter to acquire the studio by 29 June 2021, with Housemarque becoming a part of PlayStation Studios. As of April 2023, the studio has 110 employees. Harry Krueger, the director of Returnal who had been with Housemarque for more than 14 years, left the studio in November 2023. The company relocated to new offices of 3,000 square metres (32,000 sq ft) within Helsinki in 2024. In February 2025, Housemarque announced during State of Play its new game, Saros, which was released on the PlayStation 5 in 2026.

== Games developed ==
=== Bloodhouse ===
| Year | Title | Platforms | Publisher |
|---|---|---|---|
| 1993 | Stardust | Amiga, Atari ST, MS-DOS | Bloodhouse |
| 1994 | Super Stardust | Amiga, Amiga CD32 | Team17 |

=== Terramarque ===
| Year | Title | Platform | Publisher |
|---|---|---|---|
| 1994 | Elfmania | Amiga | Renegade Software |
| Cancelled | P.I.D. | Amiga | Renegade Software |

=== Housemarque ===
| Year | Title | Platforms | Publisher |
|---|---|---|---|
| 1996 | Super Stardust | MS-DOS | GameTek |
| 1996 | Alien Incident | MS-DOS | GameTek |
| 1997 | The Reap | Microsoft Windows | Take-Two Interactive |
| 1999 | Supreme Snowboarding | Microsoft Windows | Infogrames |
| 2002 | Transworld Snowboarding | Xbox | Infogrames |
| 2005 | Gizmondo Motocross 2005 | Gizmondo | Gizmondo |
| 2007 | Super Stardust HD | PlayStation 3 | Sony Computer Entertainment |
| 2008 | Golf: Tee It Up! | Xbox 360 | Activision |
| 2008 | Super Stardust Portable | PlayStation Portable | Sony Computer Entertainment |
| 2010 | Dead Nation | PlayStation 3, PlayStation 4, PlayStation Vita | Sony Computer Entertainment |
| 2011 | Outland | Linux, macOS, Microsoft Windows, PlayStation 3, Xbox 360 | Ubisoft |
| 2012 | Furmins | iOS, PlayStation Vita | Housemarque |
| 2012 | Super Stardust Delta | PlayStation Vita | Sony Computer Entertainment |
| 2012 | Angry Birds Trilogy | PlayStation 3, Xbox 360 | Activision |
| 2013 | Resogun | PlayStation 3, PlayStation 4, PlayStation Vita | Sony Computer Entertainment |
| 2015 | Super Stardust Ultra | PlayStation 4 | Sony Computer Entertainment |
| 2016 | Alienation | PlayStation 4 | Sony Computer Entertainment |
| 2017 | Nex Machina | Microsoft Windows, PlayStation 4 | Housemarque |
| 2017 | Matterfall | PlayStation 4 | Sony Interactive Entertainment |
| 2021 | Returnal | PlayStation 5, Microsoft Windows | Sony Interactive Entertainment |
| 2026 | Saros | PlayStation 5 | Sony Interactive Entertainment |

=== Cancelled games ===
- Stormdivers
