= Resogun =

2013 video game

- Developers: Housemarque; Climax Studios (PS3, Vita)
- Publisher: Sony Computer Entertainment
- Producer: Ian Pickles
- Programmer: Harry Krueger
- Composer: Ari Pulkkinen
- Platforms: PlayStation 4 PlayStation 3 PlayStation Vita
- Release: PlayStation 4: NA: 15 November 2013; PAL: 29 November 2013; PlayStation 3 & PS Vita: EU: 17 December 2014; NA: 23 December 2014
- Genre: Shoot 'em up
- Modes: Single-player, multiplayer (PS4)

Resogun is a 2013 shoot 'em up video game developed by Housemarque and published by Sony Computer Entertainment for the PlayStation 4. Ports for PlayStation 3 and PlayStation Vita developed by Climax Studios were released the following year. It draws heavily from the games Defender and Datastorm, and is considered the spiritual successor to Housemarque's previous shoot 'em up games Super Stardust HD and Super Stardust Delta.

In the game, the player battles enemies and rescues trapped humans in a cylindrical, voxel-based world. The game was well received by video game journalists, who lauded its graphical prowess, fast-paced gameplay, and soundtrack, though it was criticized for its short length and lack of tutorials. Resogun won several awards, and was nominated for Action Game of the Year at the 17th Annual D.I.C.E. Awards, and also appeared at the 2014 GDC Choice Awards.

== Gameplay ==
In Resogun, the player battles enemies in a cylindrical, voxel-based world. Here, the player fights off enemies coming from both directions as they wait for the next human to be released.

In Resogun, the player battles phases of enemies on five distinct, cylindrical, voxel-based levels: Acis, Ceres, Decima, Febris, and Mefitis. Each level is separated into three phases and includes a unique boss enemy. Although the primary goal of each level is to eliminate all enemies, including the boss, humans can be saved in order to gain a bonus score towards the player's final score. In order to save a human, it must first be released from its chamber by killing a set of "keepers." Upon release, the player can pick up the human and bring it to one of two safety points.

Three ships (Nemesis, Ferox, and Phobos) are available for selection; each ship has different levels of agility, boost, and overdrive. In addition, various upgrades and powerups are available to the player throughout each level. Overdrive, once charged, produces a powerful beam of energy that is capable of taking out large quantities of enemies. Boost acts as a speed boost and allows the player to escape from enemies, as well as destroy enemies by colliding with them. The nova-bomb produces a large explosion that clears all enemies currently on the level. These are limited in quantity but can be obtained through pickups. Ship upgrades and extra lives can also be obtained through pickups, or by saving humans. You can also choose from a selection of custom made skins for your ship made by other people online.

Upon completion of each level, the player will receive a bonus score. The amount of bonus score depends on various factors, including the number of humans saved and the number of nova-bombs preserved, to name a few. In addition, the game features two game modes: Single Level and Arcade. In Single Level mode, the player selects one single level and attempts to complete that level for a single high score. In Arcade Mode, however, the player continues to the next level after the successful completion of each level. Difficulties include Rookie, Experienced, Veteran, Master, and Hero.

== Development and release ==
Resogun was developed by Housemarque, an independent game development studio from Finland known for its previous shoot 'em up games, and published by Sony Computer Entertainment. Resogun draws heavy inspiration from the games Defender and Datastorm, and acts as the spiritual successor to Housemarque's most recent Super Stardust games (Super Stardust HD and Super Stardust Delta), from which it directly borrows certain gameplay mechanics like the boost power-up. Harry Krueger, the lead programmer of Resogun, expanded on the inspiration for the game in an interview with S2P Magazine, explaining that "on the one hand, you have the classic shoot-and-survive gameplay of shoot 'em ups ... but there was this extra layer of gameplay there with micromanaging and saving the humans." Despite being a launch title, Resogun makes extensive use of the PlayStation 4's hardware, with each level being built by nearly 200 million voxels. Housemarque CEO Ilari Kuittinen stated that "we wanted to create a world which can break down into tiny pieces, so voxels were one of the options to use."

The game went through several stylistic changes through development, partly due to Housemarque's initial uncertainty of the graphical capabilities of the PlayStation 4. In the end, the developers struggled more with "how 'retro' the game had to look", going through several stages (including a colorful style reminiscent of games like Minecraft and Parodius) until they settled with the neon aesthetic of the game. Certain render-heavy visual effects were cut, however, to avoid placing too many fast-moving objects on the screen and to prevent visual clutter. Many Housemarque developers have remarked that the PlayStation 4 was easier to develop for than the PlayStation 3, which played a role in creating the GPU-intensive levels of Resogun. Tommaso De Benetti, community manager at Housemarque, explained that many PlayStation 3 features were initially poorly documented, and that "we [didn't] have to spend an afternoon reverse engineering basic features" during the development of Resogun.

Resogun was released in North America on 15 November 2013, in Europe on 29 November 2013, and in Japan on 22 February 2014 exclusively for the PlayStation 4 as one of two free titles offered to PlayStation Plus members. Resogun was completed mere days before its release in North America, due to last-minute tweaks and polishing by the developers. Prior to its release, a demo version of the game was playable at the Sony PlayStation booth at Gamescom 2013 and at the Eurogamer Expo in London. On 24 June 2014, the first Resogun DLC, Resogun: Heroes, was released, featuring a new game world, two new game modes, a new and improved leaderboard, and new trophies. The second DLC, Resogun: Defenders was released on 17 February 2015. The expansion includes 2 new modes, namely Protector mode and Commando mode. Several smaller DLC was also released, which includes additional skins for the ships and the humans. The official soundtrack was released on 9 June 2015. All the additional content is free for owners of the Season Pass.

== Reception ==
Reception

Aggregate score
Aggregator	Score
Metacritic	PS4: 84/100; VITA: 85/100

Review scores
Publication	Score
GameSpot	8/10
GamesRadar+	3.5/5
Giant Bomb	4/5
IGN	9.0/10
VentureBeat	65/100

Resogun received a generally positive response from critics upon release. Ben Kuchera, writing for The Penny Arcade Report, declared Resogun as "the best PlayStation 4 launch game". At Metacritic, which assigns a normalized rating out of 100 to reviews from mainstream critics, the game received an average score of 84 based on 66 reviews. Brian Albert of IGN gave Resogun a score of 9.0/10, praising the fast-paced, lagless gameplay, the energetic music, and the co-op experience, but insisted that several boss fights were not challenging enough. Peter Brown of GameSpot also praised the music, as well as the use of voxels, explaining that the "accompanying beat of the techno-laden soundtrack and the constant trickle of voxels are mesmerizing." Brad Shoemaker of Giant Bomb described Resogun as "a real audio-visual treat", also praising the graphics and sound.

Edge magazine gave Resogun a score of 8/10, praising Housemarque's use of voxels: "despite the modest expectations players might have ... Housemarque never wants you to forget that Resogun is running on new tech." Christian Donlan of Eurogamer praised Resogun's gameplay elements and challenge, such as the need for the player to be aware of their surroundings in order to do well. Eric L. Patterson of EGM gave Resogun a score of 9.0/10, describing it as "another expertly produced retro-inspired shooter from Housemarque."

McKinley Noble of GamesBeat gave Resogun a score of 65/100, praising it for its graphics and challenging gameplay, but criticizing it for its lack of clarity with regard to gameplay elements; in particular, the lack of any kind of tutorial level or "training wheels". Noble expanded on this by explaining that "some players might get bewildered when trying to figure out their weapons and when to use them, and the audio cues aren’t obvious enough to be helpful." Noble also criticized the game's lack of appeal to players who wanted to "blitz through tons of levels" and "unlock extra ships", stating that "you won’t find much content past what's offered upfront." Kyle Hilliard of Game Informer gave Resogun a score of 8/10, criticizing the graphics as "doing little to showcase the next generation", as well as the sound, which he described as "forgettable-yet-appropriate". Hilliard praised the game for its controls, however, as well as the accessible and fun nature of the gameplay. The game won several awards, and was nominated for Action Game of the Year at the 17th Annual D.I.C.E. Awards, in addition to appearing at the 2014 GDC Choice Awards.
