= Matterfall =

2017 video game

- Developer: Housemarque
- Publisher: Sony Interactive Entertainment
- Director: Tommi Hartikainen
- Designer: Jari Hokkanen
- Platform: PlayStation 4
- Release: NA: 15 August 2017; EU: 16 August 2017
- Genre: Shooter
- Mode: Single-player

Matterfall is a 2017 side-scrolling shooter video game developed by Housemarque and published by Sony Interactive Entertainment. The game was released for the PlayStation 4 in August 2017. It received mixed reviews from critics.

== Gameplay ==
Matterfall is a side-scrolling shooter game with platforming elements. The game is set on a futuristic science fiction world that has been infected by an alien material known as "Smart Matter". The player takes control of Avalon Darrow who dons an armoured battle suit. Darrow can jump, dodge, and blast aliens. Darrow can also create platforms to explore the environment and generate shields to deflect attacks of enemies.

== Development and release ==
Matterfall was developed by Housemarque and published by Sony Interactive Entertainment. The game was announced in October 2015 during Paris Games Week. It was released for PlayStation 4 on 15 August 2017 in North America and in Europe on the following day. Sony offered a copy of the game's soundtrack and a PlayStation 4 theme as a pre-order incentive for Matterfall.

== Reception ==
Reception

Aggregate score
Aggregator	Score
Metacritic	73/100

Review scores
Publication	Score
Computer Games Magazine	9/10
Destructoid	7.5/10
Electronic Gaming Monthly	4/5
Game Informer	8/10
GameSpot	6/10
IGN	7/10
Push Square	7/10
VentureBeat	80/100

Matterfall received "mixed or average" reviews from critics, according to review aggregator platform Metacritic. In Game Informer's Reader's Choice Best of 2017 Awards, the game came in fourth place each for "Best Sony Game" and "Best Action Game". It was also nominated for "Arcade Game" at The Independent Game Developers' Association Awards 2017, and for "Control Design, 2D or Limited 3D" at the 17th Annual National Academy of Video Game Trade Reviewers Awards.
