= Slusnik Luna =

Finnish electronic music duo

- Origin: Helsinki, Finland
- Genres: Trance
- Years active: 1994–present
- Labels: Anjunabeats
- Members: Niko Nyman; Nicklas Renqvist
- Website: Slusnik Luna official website

Slusnik Luna are a Finnish electronic music duo formed in Helsinki in 1994, composed of Niko Nyman and Nicklas Renqvist. The pair play and produce trance and house tracks. They also produced soundtracks for the Amiga CD32 version of the video game, Super Stardust, (1995) published by Team17 and developed by Bloodhouse.

Their debut single, "Sun", was initially released in October 2000 on Unity Records, a record label newly founded by the people behind the Helsinki club night Club Unity (headlined by DJ Orkidea). "Sun" was originally made as a theme for a yearly Sunday club night of the same name, also run by the Club Unity crew. Soon after the original Unity Records release ended in the hands of Pete Tong, in 2001 "Sun" was released throughout Europe on the UK independent record label, Incentive Music, in the US on Ultra Records, and on various other labels around the world. The single was a success in the clubs, and reached #40 in the UK Singles Chart in September 2001.

It took them another three years to release their second double A-sided single, "Sinner" / "Magic Kingdom", and their chillout album, Aamukaste 5AM. The latter of these two releases won Best Album of 2004 award at the 2005 Finnish Club Awards, getting more than three times the votes of its nearest contender, and following in the steps of Darude. The pair have also enjoyed success remixing other artists' tracks, including those of artists on Unity Records. Their most notable remix was the unofficial The KLF's "Last Train To Trancentral" in 2006. In 2011 they returned with Slusnik Luna - Sun 2011 EP which includes remixes by 4 Strings, Genix, Joonas Hahmo, Heikki L and many more.

== See also ==
- Slusnik Luna official website
- Slusnik Luna official Facebook page
- Slusnik Luna Twitter
- Slusnik Luna releases on Beatport.com
- Slusnik Luna discography at Discogs
- Slusnik Luna: The Sun Rises on Finland
