= Dead Nation =

2010 video game

- Developers: Housemarque; Climax Studios (PS4 and PS Vita)
- Publisher: Sony Computer Entertainment
- Platforms: PlayStation 3, PlayStation Vita, PlayStation 4
- Release: PlayStation 3: NA: 30 November 2010; PAL: 1 December 2010; PlayStation 4: NA: 4 March 2014; PAL: 5 March 2014; PlayStation Vita: NA: 15 April 2014; PAL: 16 April 2014
- Genre: Shoot 'em up
- Modes: Single-player, multiplayer

Dead Nation is a 2010 shoot 'em up video game developed by Housemarque and published by Sony Computer Entertainment for the PlayStation 3. Dead Nation takes place in a world afflicted by a zombie apocalypse. The player can choose between a male or female character and battle different types of zombies. Dead Nation was part of Sony's "Welcome Back" package, created to resolve the initial PlayStation Network outage. In February 2014 a PlayStation 4 version of the game titled the Apocalypse Edition was announced along with the PlayStation Vita version. The original Road of Devastation downloadable content was included for the PS3 and Vita versions, and the PS4 version was free for PlayStation Plus subscribers in March 2014.

== Gameplay ==
Players are awarded score multipliers and money when zombies are killed. Money is used to purchase and upgrade weapons at checkpoints, and multipliers to grant better scores. Each time players are hit, they lose multipliers and health. Players fight their way through ten levels, using weapon shops that allow weapon upgrading and armor swapping. Throughout the levels, players can find boxes that hold ammunition, multipliers, money, or armor pieces, and also loot cars and trunks for money. If a car is blown up before being looted, though, the loot is lost. At times the players are trapped in areas where they must survive until they have accomplished a certain goal (e.g. wait for an elevator while fighting zombies or kill all zombies in the area). Armor sets influence strength, endurance and agility.

Zombies are attracted by flares, car alarms, grenades, mines, and vending machines. Zombies can be killed by environmental hazards which the player can use to their advantage. Players can encounter a variety of zombies. Players can use a melee and rush attack against zombies, as well as a variety of weaponry.

The metagame allows players to follow their country's progress in relation to other countries, as well as local leaderboards. Using the PlayStation Network, players are grouped with other players from their country. When a country is rid of zombies, a new infection cycle begins. Multiplayer can be done locally or online for two players.

== Plot ==
Society has collapsed and most of the world's population have become zombies due to a virus outbreak. A year later, the protagonists (either Jack McReady, Scarlett Blake or both when played in co-op mode) are preparing to leave their shelter in search of food and water. They are immune to the current strain of the virus. After reaching a gas station, they pick up a radio transmission, but it is just static. They head to a police station, in search for a means to strengthen the radio signal, but find out they need to get to higher ground to do so.

After picking up the transmission, they are contacted by a Doctor Morton, who tells them he works for Egogate Pharmacy company, and that he is developing a cure, but need two things: a sample of their DNA and a tissue sample from Patient Zero, named Douglas Bane, the first human being to be infected; he then directs them to Marrow hospital, through the edge of the city.

They fight their way through infested streets and, at the hospital, they find out that the body was buried in a nearby graveyard. It is revealed that the body was moved to the harbor docks via train. However, the body was moved again to Raven's Field Airport, north of the harbor, so they head there and, after collecting Bane's head, they fly using an abandoned helicopter to the underground facility, where they are welcomed by the doctor and told that they will be injected with a serum to be synthesized by their bodies and they will be living sources of the cure. However, they are to be turned into biological weapons, controlled by the company to do their bidding.

Realizing that they have nothing to lose, and there is no way out, they bite a cyanide capsule they have implanted inside their molar, in case they are overwhelmed by zombies, to prevent enduring the pain of being eaten alive. As the doctor notes that they are dying, he rushes to see what is happening, but the zombie virus has mutated and they have been infected, turning into zombies right after the capsule is opened. Their first kill is the doctor.

Assuming the first person nature of the narrative, it is implied that they have become sentient zombies.

== Reception ==
Dead Nation

Aggregate score
Aggregator	Score		
Aggregator	PS Vita	PS3	PS4
Metacritic	68/100	77/100	74/100

Review scores
Publication	Score		
Publication	PS Vita	PS3	PS4
Destructoid	N/A	6/10	N/A
Edge	N/A	5/10	N/A
Eurogamer	N/A	6/10	N/A
GamePro	N/A	3.5/5	N/A
GameSpot	N/A	7.5/10	N/A
GameZone	N/A	8.5/10	7/10
Giant Bomb	N/A	2/5	N/A
IGN	7.5/10	7.5/10	8/10
Joystiq	N/A	5/5	N/A
PlayStation: The Official Magazine	N/A	9/10	N/A
PSM3	N/A	82%	N/A
The Digital Fix	6/10	N/A	N/A
Metro	N/A	6/10	5/10

The PlayStation 3 version of Dead Nation received "generally favorable reviews", while the PlayStation 4 and Vita versions received "average" reviews, according to the review aggregation website Metacritic. The game engine was noted for supporting large numbers of zombies on screen as well as impressive lighting effects.

In 2013, the PS3 version was included in IGN's Top 25 PlayStation Network Games, at position 12.

== Updates ==
Dead Nation lacked online voice chat upon release, but an update released on 10 March 2011 added this feature. The update also included laser sight upgrades for guns and display improvements including visual indications when the rush meter fills and when players take damage.

=== Road of Devastation ===
A DLC expansion called Road of Devastation was released in September 2011 for the PS3, and in April 2014 for the PlayStation Vita. The pack focuses on continuous survival, and presents players with upgrade paths instead of stages. Each round ends by returning to a laboratory, where the player receives prizes for their achievements before starting the next round. There are three main paths, each of which splits into two sub-paths. Once a round is completed, the player cannot re-enter the same path in the following round.

Gameplay has been altered slightly compared to the main game. When a player in co-op mode opens a box with money, the amount acquired is only given to the player that opened the box. Zombie strength, health and speed increase with each round. The game ends when the player dies, forcing them to restart from the beginning. A patch added an arcade mode to the DLC, where progress can be saved between rounds, but players are limited to play until Round 6, and the original mode now is called "Endless".

=== Reception ===
Dead Nation: Road of Devastation

Aggregate score
Aggregator	Score
Metacritic	75/100

Review scores
Publication	Score
GamePro	3.5/5
PSM3	8/10
411Mania	6/10

The PS3 version of the Road of Devastation DLC received "generally favorable reviews" according to Metacritic.
