= Super Stardust HD =

2007 video game

- PlayStation Store icon
- Developers: Housemarque; Ultra; D3T
- Publisher: Sony Computer Entertainment
- Director: Harri Tikkanen
- Producer: Ivan Davies
- Designer: Harri Tikkanen
- Composer: Ari Pulkkinen
- Platforms: PlayStation 3, PlayStation Portable, PlayStation 4
- Release: PlayStation 3: NA: 28 June 2007; PAL: 27 December 2007; PlayStation Portable: PAL: 25 November 2008; NA: 4 December 2008; PlayStation 4: NA: 10 February 2015; PAL: 11 February 2015
- Genre: Multidirectional shooter
- Modes: Single-player, multiplayer

Super Stardust HD is a 2007 multidirectional shooter video game developed by Housemarque and published by Sony Computer Entertainment for the PlayStation 3. It was released on the PlayStation Network, with a PlayStation Portable version titled Super Stardust Portable releasing the following year. An HD remake for the PlayStation 4 developed by D3T was released as Super Stardust Ultra in 2015. In 2016, Super Stardust Ultra VR, a PlayStation VR-compatible version that contains Super Stardust Ultra, was released as paid downloadable content and a separate product in itself.

The game combines the mechanics of Asteroids and Robotron: 2084 with a level of action found typically in modern games such as Geometry Wars. The game is an enhanced version of Super Stardust, developed by Bloodhouse, a predecessor of Housemarque, for the Amiga; Sony acquired the rights to the game before remaking it. Super Stardust HD was the first title with trophy support on the PlayStation 3.

A sequel, Super Stardust Delta, was released in 2012 for the PlayStation Vita.

== Gameplay ==
In Super Stardust HD, the player controls a space fighter craft that can move in any direction on a spherical shield surrounding a planet, while simultaneously firing in any direction independent of its movement. The primary threats against the player are three types of asteroids and various enemy spacecraft, which appear on the playfield at certain time intervals. The ship is equipped with three upgradeable weapons, a limited arsenal of bombs, and a boost capability that grants temporary invincibility and recharges after use. Each weapon is more effective against certain types of asteroid and enemies than others. Items are dropped onto the planet at certain time intervals, these items include weapon upgrades and a shield that absorbs one fatal hit against the player's ship.

Super Stardust HD provides several modes of play, each with their own online leaderboards. The default game mode, Arcade, takes the player through a series of five planets, each consisting of five main phases, the last of which is a boss battle. Planet Mode allows the player to play any one of five planets in the same way, ending the game after the planet is complete. Both of these modes support both single-player and two-player cooperative play.

== Updates and downloadable content packs ==
The Solo add-on pack (released in April 2008 and available for download via the PlayStation Store) adds several extra gameplay modes. Endless Mode pits the player against a continuous onslaught of rocks and enemies, gradually speeding up the action over time. Survival Mode challenges the player to last as long as possible while the playfield is filled with indestructible objects. Bomber Mode challenges players to score as many points as they can using only bombs and a single life – primary weapons and the boost ability are disabled. Time Attack mode challenges the player to complete a planet's worth of rocks and enemies in the shortest time possible – losing a life in this mode incurs a 3-minute penalty. The PSP version also received its own version of the Solo add-on pack, with only the Endless, Survival and Bomber modes, along with two new soundtracks. The Japanese version of the PSP game already comes with this pack.

With the release of game update version 2.40 on 2 July 2008, PlayStation trophy support was added to the title. This made Super Stardust HD the first title with trophy support on the PlayStation 3. A total of 17 trophies are available for the game.

The Team Pack was also released the same day, which includes split-screen co-op and player versus player modes. The pack also offers an additional orchestral soundtrack in 5.1 surround and the ability to customize the player ship's appearance. The Team Pack was available for purchase from within the game and via the PlayStation Store before being removed with the 2.40 firmware. It was soon reinstated on July 15, in a store update after Sony's E3 press conference.

Stereoscopic 3D support was demonstrated at the 2010 Consumer Electronics Show and released in June in the same year. Super Stardust HD is the first 3D game for the PS3 that runs at 720p resolution at 60 frames per second for each eye (120 frames per second). The original 2D version supports full 1080p resolution at 60 frames per second.

Impact Mode, released in April 2011 on the PlayStation Store, introduces much higher score multipliers. With weapons disabled in Impact Mode, the primary mode of attack is a modified version of the ship's boost capability, which remains active as long as there are targets to attack nearby.

== Reception ==
Reception

Aggregate score
Aggregator	Score		
Aggregator	PS3	PS4	PSP
Metacritic	85/100	74/100 (VR) 66/100	69/100

Review scores
Publication	Score		
Publication	PS3	PS4	PSP
Destructoid	N/A	7/10	N/A
Edge	8/10	N/A	N/A
Eurogamer	9/10	N/A	7/10
Famitsu	N/A	32/40	N/A
Game Informer	N/A	7.25/10	N/A
GameSpot	7/10	N/A	N/A
GameZone	N/A	N/A	6.7/10
IGN	(US) 8.7/10 (UK & AU); 8.5/10 (Solo) 8.2/10	N/A	6.5/10
PlayStation Official Magazine – UK	8/10	7/10	7/10
USgamer	N/A	4.5/5	N/A
The Digital Fix	N/A	7/10	N/A
Metro	N/A	7/10	N/A

The HD edition of Super Stardust received "favorable" reviews, while the Portable, Ultra, and its VR version received "average" reviews, according to the review aggregation website Metacritic. In Japan, where the Ultra version was ported for release on March 12, 2015, Famitsu gave it a score of one eight, one seven, one nine, and one eight for a total of 32 out of 40.

In 2013, the game entered IGN's "Top 25 PlayStation Network Games" list in the 4th position.

Super Stardust HD has sold approximately 400,000 units for the PS3 as of September 2010.

== Legacy ==
Super Stardust HD was one of the games given for free by Sony as part of their 'Welcome Back' package due to the PlayStation Network outage in 2011.

A remake, Super Stardust Ultra (known in Asia as Star Strike Ultra), was released in North America and the PAL region in February 2015 for the PlayStation 4. It adds an exclusive mode called Interactive Streaming, which is an endless mode where the game is streamed live over the Internet, and viewers are allowed to help or hinder the player. A port of Super Stardust Ultra titled Super Stardust Ultra VR, offering a unique perspective from within the cockpit, was released as a launch title for the PlayStation VR. The title was developed by UK based company D3T.

In 2022, Super Stardust Portable was re-released on the PlayStation 4 and PlayStation 5, with trophy support and the Solo add-on pack already included.
