= Super Stardust Delta =

2012 video game

- PlayStation Store icon
- Developer: Housemarque
- Publisher: Sony Computer Entertainment
- Director: Harri Tikkanen
- Producer: Mark O'Connor
- Designers: Amar Djouad; Henri Mustonen
- Programmers: Jere "XMunkki" Sanisalo; Markku Velinen
- Composer: Ari Pulkkinen
- Series: Stardust
- Platform: PlayStation Vita
- Release: JP: 19 January 2012; NA: 15 February 2012; PAL: 22 February 2012
- Genre: Multidirectional shooter
- Mode: Single-player

Super Stardust Delta is a 2012 multidirectional shooter video game developed by Housemarque and published by Sony Computer Entertainment for the PlayStation Vita. It is part of Housemarque's Stardust series and a sequel to Super Stardust HD.

== Gameplay ==
Using the PlayStation Vita's dual analog sticks, players control a starship orbiting a generic planet. The planet's orbit acts as the playfield, filled with asteroids, lasers, and enemies for the player to destroy or avoid. In the main arcade mode, there are 5 planets, consisting of 5 phases each. At the end of each planet, the player encounters a boss, as in a traditional platform or adventure game.

The ship is equipped with a wide variety of weapons, smart bombs, a temporary shield, and a speed booster system to defend or attack. The ship has two projectile weapons of opposite polarities (Ice and Fire) that can be switched between on-the-fly. While one is effective against a certain type of enemy, it can be almost useless against another so players must quickly adapt to situations, constantly choosing which weapon to use against what. Each weapon can be powered up over the course of the game by collecting tokens as in "space invaders" (dropped onto orbit from destroyed enemy craft/asteroids). The ship is also able to collect and deploy smart bombs, which usually clear most of the playfield. When deploying a smart bomb players can choose the desired effect: Black Hole, Missile Strike, or EMP bomb. The PlayStation Vita's touch-screen controls Missile Strike, rear touch opens Black Hole, and motion control (shaking) deploys the EMP Bomb.

Other unique features of Super Stardust Delta are that the view can be tilted to see around the planet, and the ship's speed boost system has a slow-motion feature that enables players to navigate the ship with more precision while boosting. Super Stardust Delta also has 11 unique game modes, more than in any of the preceding titles in the series. Each game mode has its own unique challenges and scenarios. The different game modes are "Arcade", "Planets", "Endless", "Bomber", "Impact", "Twin-Gun", "Crush!", "Disc Slide", "Orbit Bomber", "Rock & Roll", and "Trucker". The main game modes have three difficulty levels to choose from: "Casual", "Normal", or "Hardcore". Many of the game modes let players choose whether to play the game with the "Delta" or "Pure" control configuration. The "Delta" configuration allows gameplay with new features, with players using the touchscreen, motion controls, as well as button controls to play the game, enabling the Black Hole and Missile Strike smart bombs, as well as the speed boost getting the slow-motion feature. The "Pure" configuration features simple button controls only, and does not include the latter features.

Super Stardust Delta has global leaderboards accessible via PlayStation Network.

=== Downloadable content ===
The "Blast Pack" was available on launch day on the PlayStation Network. It gives players four new game modes. "Endless" provides ever-increasing waves of enemies and asteroids. "Bomber" tests how long players can survive when armed only with bombs. "Impact" tests how long players can keep their boost up; boosting through objects increases the boost meter. In "Twin-Gun" mode the player's ship two cannons which can be controlled simultaneously using the control sticks while motion controls are used for steering.

== Development ==
Housemarque encountered two problems during the development which caused lowered FPS. The problems were poor rendering performance on the GPU and poor simulation speeds on the CPU.

To solve these issues Housemarque changed to lighter and more efficient shaders. They optimized the GPU performance through small tweaks like they rendered the Black Hole effect on the same shader as the "game grid" (planet orbit/playfield).

To increase simulation speed on the CPU, the development team created a custom gameplay architecture where all gameplay code runs multithreaded. This architecture uses a fiber based system to switch between active simulations, ensuring that all of the CPU cores are utilized efficiently. This allows most of the CPU cores to calculate collisions and frame updates for the whole frame duration.

== Soundtrack ==
The game has four soundtracks. Three of the soundtracks are made by Ari Pulkkinen, who also provided the soundtracks for Super Stardust HD and Super Stardust Portable. The soundtracks are: "Delta" (the new PlayStation Vita soundtrack), "Arcade" (original Super Stardust HD soundtrack), "Orchestral" (a DLC soundtrack for Super Stardust HD), and "Retro" (old retro music from Stardust games of the 90's, composed by Risto Vuori). For the Arcade and Orchestral soundtrack, new tracks are unlocked each time the game is started. The Retro soundtrack required the Near app and is no longer unlockable after its closure in 2017.

== Reception ==
Reception

Aggregate score
Aggregator	Score
Metacritic	82/100

Review scores
Publication	Score
Destructoid	7.5/10
Edge	8/10
Eurogamer	8/10
Game Informer	8/10
GameRevolution	4/5
GameSpot	7/10
GameZone	8.5/10
Giant Bomb	4/5
IGN	9.5/10
PlayStation: The Official Magazine	8/10
Digital Spy	3/5
Metro	7/10

The game was reviewed on Metacritic.

Carolyn Petit of GameSpot said the game is a "fitting launch game for the Vita's download store" due to its abundant use of color and flash that emphasizes the display capabilities of the PlayStation Vita, but Petit added that the gameplay was unoriginal and similar to other dual-stick shooters in the genre.
