= Does Not Commute =

2015 video game

- App icon
- Developer(s): Mediocre
- Publisher(s): Mediocre
- Designer(s): Henrik Johansson
- Programmer(s): Dennis Gustafsson
- Artist(s): Henrik Johansson
- Writer(s): Simon Flesser
- Composer(s): Douglas Holmquist
- Platform(s): Android, iOS, tvOS
- Release: April 23, 2015 tvOS: October 19, 2015
- Genre(s): Puzzle, strategy
- Mode(s): Single-player

Does Not Commute is a 2015 puzzle and strategy game developed and published by the Swedish studio Mediocre. In the game, the player has to move vehicles to a certain point on a level while avoiding other vehicles from their previous attempts. It was released for Android and iOS devices on April 23, 2015. Received positively for its gameplay, the game won the 2015 edition of the Apple Design Awards.

== Gameplay ==
Set in a 1970s suburb, Does Not Commute is a puzzle and strategy game where the player starts with controlling a vehicle to a certain point on a level within a set amount of time. Once completed, time will reset, and the player will have to control a new vehicle that is added to the level. Previous vehicles will repeat their route the player has set. Marked collectibles can be picked up to increase time; the player may also use a rewind feature to undo their previous moves, but it will cost them one second. They may use shortcuts to avoid other vehicles, and an in-app purchase unlocks checkpoints. A practice mode is available.

== Development and release ==
Does Not Commute was developed by Mediocre, a Swedish indie studio composed of Dennis Gustafsson and Henrik Johansson. They had previously created games such as Smash Hit, Sprinkle Islands and Granny Smith.

Does Not Commute's soundtrack was composed by Douglas Holmquist. The time period the game was set in was decided early in development; initially, Holmquist opted for a "loungey" soundtrack involving the flute, vibraphone, and light percussion. The first version of the game's soundtrack was inspired by music from the movie Sideways and musicians such as Yusef Lateef, Cal Tjader, and the Modern Jazz Quartet. However, since the concept of the game became more "action-based", the soundtrack was considered "too soft", so "Sorta Blue" by Henry Mancini, was used for inspiration. The soundtrack for a level titled Beach was conceptualized after a bike ride with the game's co-developers Dennis Gustafsson and Henrik Johansson, and a band was scheduled for a four-day session. Showcased at GDC 2015, Does Not Commute was released on Android and iOS for free on April 23, 2015.

== Reception ==
Reception

Aggregate score
Aggregator	Score
Metacritic	87/100

Review scores
Publication	Score
Gamezebo	90/100
Pocket Gamer	4/5
TouchArcade	5/5
148Apps	4/5
Multiplayer.it	8/10
Vandal	8.9/10

On Metacritic, Does Not Commute received a "generally favorable" score of 87 based on eight critics. The game won the 2015 Apple Design Awards at the Worldwide Developers Conference and has been ranked among TouchArcade's and The Guardian's lists of best apps.

Several reviewers praised the gameplay. Most found the game and its dialogue entertaining, while others stated it was challenging or frustrating. Carter Dotson of TouchArcade approved how the game's in-app purchase offered players an opportunity for help, while Gamezebo's Nadia Oxford found that players were effectively forced to plan their decisions. Critics also found the game's minimalist graphics appealing.
