= Marek Rosa =

Slovak entrepreneur and software developer

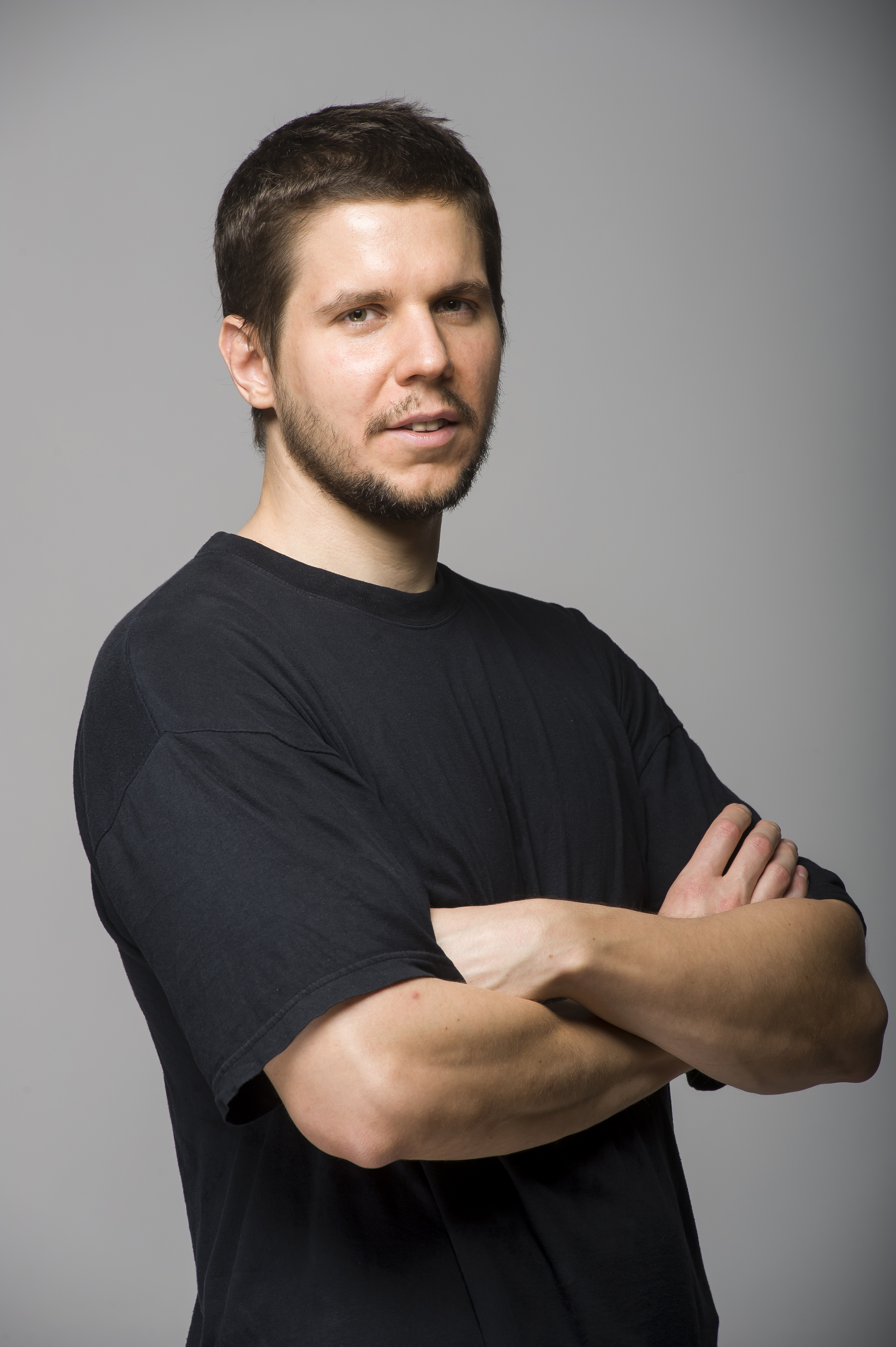
- Website: blog.marekrosa.org

Marek Rosa is a Slovak entrepreneur, programmer, and computer game developer. He is known as the CEO and founder of Keen Software House, an independent video game design studio, and CEO, Founder, and CTO of GoodAI, a company dedicated to the research and development of general artificial intelligence. Both companies are based in Prague, the Czech Republic, and have their headquarters in the historical Oranžérie.

== Keen Software House ==
In 2010, Marek founded Keen Software House. The company created video games including Space Engineers and Medieval Engineers.

== GoodAI ==
In 2014 Marek founded GoodAI with a $10 million personal investment and in 2015 the company was announced publicly. Marek is the CEO and CTO of GoodAI and set the mission which is to “develop safe general artificial intelligence - as fast as possible - to help humanity and understand the universe.”

In January 2017, Marek announced the creation of the AI Roadmap Institute, which aims to accelerate the creation of safe human-level artificial intelligence by encouraging, studying, mapping and comparing roadmaps towards this goal. In February 2017, he launched the General AI Challenge, pledging $5 million in prize money to tackle crucial research problems in human-level AI development.

In August 2020, Marek announced the GoodAI Grants initiative to provide a $300,000 grant fund for artificial intelligence research.

== Oranžérie reconstruction ==
Marek purchased the historical baroque chateau, the Oranžérie in 2018. He has reconstructed the building and it is now the headquarters of both GoodAI and Keen Software House.

== Panama Papers ==
Marek has been mentioned in the Panama Papers.
