= Teardown (video game) =

2022 video game

- Developer: Tuxedo Labs
- Publishers: Windows; Tuxedo Labs; PS5, Xbox Series X/S; Saber Interactive
- Director: Dennis Gustafsson
- Designers: Dennis Gustafsson; Emil Bengtsson
- Programmer: Dennis Gustafsson
- Artists: Emil Bengtsson; John Kearney
- Writer: Dennis Gustafsson
- Composer: Douglas Holmquist
- Platforms: Windows, PlayStation 5, Xbox Series X/S
- Release: Windows; 21 April 2022; PS5, Xbox Series X/S; 15 November 2023
- Genres: Sandbox, puzzle
- Modes: Single-player, multiplayer

Teardown is a 2022 sandbox game with puzzle and action elements. Developed and published by Tuxedo Labs, the game revolves around the owner of a financially stricken demolition company, who is caught undertaking a questionable job and becomes entangled in helping police investigations while taking on further dubious assignments. Teardown features levels made of destructible voxels, and the player follows the campaign through consecutive missions. In most missions, the player must collect or destroy objects connected to a security alarm that triggers a timer. The player has unlimited time to prepare and is given upgradable tools, vehicles, and explosives to create a path within the level that allows them to complete the objectives and reach a getaway vehicle before the timer runs out.

Teardown uses a proprietary game engine developed by Dennis Gustafsson, who began creating the technology after winding down his previous company, Mediocre, in 2017. He initially implemented destructible voxels with ray tracing and, after several discarded designs, conceived the two-phase heist concept. While working closely with the former Mediocre designer Emil Bengtsson, Gustafsson regularly shared development updates via Twitter and the resulting popularity led him not to pursue traditional marketing for Teardown. The game was announced in October 2019 and an early version was available through early access from October 2020, with the full game released in April 2022.

Teardown saw positive reactions leading up to and during its early access phase, and it received favourable reviews upon release. Critics praised the game's physics, interactivity, graphics implementation, art style, and music. Mixed opinions were voiced regarding the campaign progression and story, while some control elements were criticised. The game's support for mods was cited as a major factor for its potential longevity. Teardown had sold 1.1 million copies by August 2022, and the game's success led to Tuxedo Labs being acquired by Saber Interactive under Embracer Group. PlayStation 5 and Xbox Series X/S ports, published by Saber Interactive, were released in November 2023, upping the player count to 2.5 million.

== Gameplay ==
Teardown's levels consist of destructible voxels representing various materials. Here, a locked metal gate is broken open with an excavator.

Teardown is a sandbox game with puzzle and action elements. It is played from a first-person perspective. The player can freely navigate the game's nine levels, which consist entirely of aggregates of destructible voxels. The player starts out with a sledgehammer, fire extinguisher, and spraycan. The spraycan can be used to paint surfaces, for example to mark routes and points of interest. Other tools are unlocked throughout the campaign, including a blowtorch, a shotgun, bombs, and a rocket launcher, which have limited uses. Some voxel materials require these stronger tools to destroy. Wooden planks can be used to erect structures, such as ramps. Acquired tools can be upgraded using cash earned from collecting valuables scattered throughout levels. For example, the player can obtain more and longer planks and increase the damage caused by bombs. The player can additionally create explosions using propane tanks placed around levels. Vehicles like cars, trucks, cranes, excavators, and boats can be used for traversal and destruction. While operating them, the game temporarily switches to a third-person view.

Each mission comprises one or more objectives, of which some are required and some optional. In most missions, the player is tasked with stealing or destroying a predetermined set of objects connected to a security alarm. Once an alarm is triggered, the player has sixty seconds to complete the required objectives and reach a getaway vehicle. Failing to do so results in a security helicopter spotting the getaway vehicle and the player failing the level. The initial setup time is unlimited to allow the player to plan and create a fast route between the objectives. Level overviews and route replays are presented from a top-down view. In other kinds of missions, the player must raze buildings to an indicated height, move heavy objects to one location, dodge an attack helicopter, evade security robots, or extinguish fires from lightning strikes to avoid triggering a fire alarm. Some levels feature multiple missions with slightly altered world designs, and there are 40 missions in the main campaign. All missions are accessible via a hub world, and previous level progress can be reloaded after a quick save.

In multiplayer, up to twelve players can play the campaign cooperatively, roam sandbox levels, and engage in competitive modes like deathmatch, team deathmatch, and capture the flag. Through accessibility options, the player can adjust the game's difficulty, such as by increasing the time they have to complete a level after triggering the timer. Outside of the campaign, the Sandbox mode puts the player into any of the unlocked levels with all tools and their upgrades but without objectives. In the Creative mode, the player can model 3D objects by painting voxels inside the game world. These objects can be saved and repurposed in other levels. Three challenge modes can be played on each unlocked level: In Mayhem, the player must destroy as many voxels as possible within sixty seconds; in Hunted, the player is tasked with collecting randomly appearing items while being chased by an attack helicopter; and in Fetch, the player has to collect as many items as possible in a sixty-second time frame.

=== Modding ===
Custom levels and structures can be modelled using the program MagicaVoxel and imported into the game. On PCs, Teardown includes a level editor and integration with the Steam Workshop. Most game elements are scriptable using the Lua programming language. Early on, players created art using the in-game tools, while mods had appeared by November 2020. Certain mods provide alternative gameplay in different genres. More than 6,000 mods had been submitted to the Steam Workshop by September 2023, up from 1,100 in May 2022 and over 5,000 in March 2023. Modding competitions are held biannually. Teardown on PCs highlights developer-curated mods in the main menu. On consoles, select mods are released as part of "Mod Pack" collections. Six such packs were released by September 2026.

== Plot ==
Teardown's story is primarily told through emails that the player character receives. The game takes place in the fictional Löckelle Municipality, and the player controls the owner of Löckelle Teardown Services. (Note: To leave the protagonist's design to the player's imagination, the character initially had no name, age, gender, personality traits, or ability to respond to emails. An October 2024 update added several playable characters, including custom avatars.) The company is facing financial hardship due to a lack of clients, so the owner accepts a dubious job from Gordon Woo, the general manager of the Evertides Mall, who requests an old building to be destroyed during the night to make way for the mall's construction. On the day after the demolition, the owner's mother, Tracy, alerts them to the fact that the razed building was under cultural heritage protection and that a traffic camera had caught the company vehicle entering the site. Parisa Terdiman, a Löckelle Police Department criminal investigator, agrees not to pursue an investigation if the owner helps her investigate Lawrence Lee Junior and his company, Lee Chemicals. Under her orders, the owner repeatedly breaks into the premises of Lee Chemicals and into Lee's private properties to retrieve information about a mystery client.

While Lee and Woo repeatedly request destruction jobs aimed at the other, Terdiman discovers that the Lee Chemicals client is BlueTide, an energy drink producer run by Mr. Amanatides. As no official records exist on Amanatides, Terdiman asks the owner to retrieve communication data from BlueTide's premises on Hollowrock Island, as well as accounting data from Lee Chemicals. Through Woo, Amanatides learns of the owner's services and hires them to increase BlueTide's security by obtaining confidential information on autonomous guard robots. As Terdiman investigates an unknown addictive substance found in BlueTide's drinks, a leftover shipping label recovered from Hollowrock Island reveals that Amanatides controls the Evertides Mall and uses it as a repackaging hub for the substance. Shipping logs from the Evertides Mall lead the owner to the Muratori Islands, where Terdiman orders them to secure evidence and destroy the local supply chain.

As a result of the disruptions on Hollowrock Island, at the Evertides Mall, and on the Muratori Islands, Amanatides fires Woo as the mall's manager and plots revenge against those who he believes harmed BlueTide's business. He orders the owner to retrieve a truck, autonomous robots, and nitroglycerin. Amanatides uses these components to assemble a destructive machine he dubs the Truxterminator. Terdiman and the Löckelle Police Department raid Hollowrock Island and apprehend Amanatides, who reveals that he had already deployed the Truxterminator to destroy the town of Cullington, where he had spotted a Löckelle Teardown Services company vehicle in Tracy's driveway. Tracy is unaware of her fate as she is trying out her new tanning bed, so the owner arrives in Cullington and safely guides the Truxterminator through the town and into the sea.

== Development and release ==
=== Technology and prototypes ===
Teardown was developed by Tuxedo Labs, an indie game studio founded by the Swedish programmer Dennis Gustafsson. Gustafsson had previously been involved with companies developing middleware for game physics. With Henrik Johansson, he founded the mobile game studio Mediocre in 2010, where they worked on Smash Hit, PinOut, and the Sprinkle series. After shutting down Mediocre in 2017, Gustafsson began working on technology for destructible environments using voxels, an idea he had been looking to pursue for some time. Destructible voxels appeared easier to implement because regular polygons would have led to arbitrary geometry with overly complex collision detection. He implemented the voxel technology alongside real-time ray tracing, which the simplicity of voxel-based scenes made possible. The voxel style was inspired by MagicaVoxel, which Gustafsson had discovered on Twitter. Ultimately, ray tracing was used for most graphics elements, allowing for more realistic lighting. Reflection colours use the "screen space reflection" model instead of full-path tracing "for performance reasons". Smoke is simulated using a fluid animation system Gustafsson had authored for Sprinkle. Unlike traditional voxel engines that manage all voxels in a single volume, Gustafsson chose to use several volumes that contain a smaller number of voxels to allow for local translation. The resulting game engine and custom tools were written in C++. In the engine, voxels were implemented using an 8-bit colour palette, where each material determines a voxel's colour, roughness, emissiveness, reflectivity, and physical type.

After creating a voxel sandbox, Gustafsson worked alongside the former Mediocre designer Emil Bengtsson to come up with gameplay concepts. Like with Smash Hit and Sprinkle, Gustafsson wanted to model the gameplay around the technology, this time using destruction as a key element. He described this process as difficult "because any traditional game objective could just be solved by the player creating a straight line from A to B", with walls and doors unable to restrict the player. Several ideas were floated, starting with a driving game in which the player would drive into and topple objects. They decided against this concept because the destruction was merely an effect rather than central to the gameplay. Several stealth game prototypes followed over the span of several months, but Gustafsson and Bengtsson were unable to construct stealth gameplay where the enemies were insensitive to the sound of the player's destruction. Lastly, they toyed with a heist concept, requiring the player to steal a predefined set of objects but considered this task too trivial and regarded using limited tools and caches as too restrictive. In early 2019, seven months into the development, after the two could not agree on a gameplay variant, Bengtsson left the project. Gustafsson further experimented with the technology on his own. He explored a survival game prototype featuring giant spiders but was generally not content with the use of enemies, which would disrupt the destructive gameplay. Gustafsson stated that it was difficult to find a justification for the possible destruction in the game without resorting to a shooter game or violent gameplay in general. As a result, the game was solely a sandbox for most of its development. He considered the design process his most frustrating yet.

=== Game design and implementation ===
Gustafsson shared the progress of his technology on Twitter from 2018 onwards. By August 2019, he had developed a game concept that he planned to release. Gustafsson came up with the two-phase heist structure with unlimited setup time and limited execution time. He said that it was "compatible with all the limitations (or lack thereof)" of a fully destructible environment while "offering an interesting challenge". As a result of the destructibility, obstacles within levels could only be designed with elevation, distance, water, and unbreakable objects. Additionally, Gustafsson intended to use few unbreakable parts, mostly for lower level bounds. He avoided overly large maps, initially due to a technical restriction, and later to keep navigation from becoming tedious. Within the second phase of the structure, Gustafsson settled on a simple timer, rather than other concepts, such as a slowly flooding cavern. The initial levels Gustafsson designed with this concept in mind were long, straight corridors that the player would have travelled twice, reaching an item and returning to the getaway vehicle. He discovered that the game played much better when it featured multiple objectives in a non-linear open world, which became the final design. Bengtsson soon re-joined the project to design levels and missions for it.

Levels were designed with MagicaVoxel. For the quick save system, Gustafsson used run-length encoding to compress world data at high speeds, seeking to encourage the system's use by eliminating long load times. A popular request from fans was to have the security helicopter not spot the getaway vehicle when the timer runs out and instead chase after the player. Gustafsson disliked this idea, saying that it "would introduce an element of randomness that would discourage the strategic thinking and careful planning". He once looked into procedurally altering levels between sessions to reflect damage the player had inflicted earlier but scrapped the idea due to time. Adding multiplayer was not planned at the time, as the engine was written for single-player gameplay, and the team considered the networked synchronisation of all voxel physics technically infeasible. Anticipating that players would want to mod the game, he moved much of the game's gameplay logic from C++ to Lua. Gustafsson cited as the ultimate goal that modders should be able to create entirely new gameplay mechanics within the game's framework.

=== Music and sound design ===
Douglas Holmquist, who had worked on many of Mediocre's games, created Teardown's music and sound design, starting part-time in November 2019 before joining full-time in February 2020. He recorded impact, break, and squeak sounds for the in-game materials, weapon sounds (using a Benelli M4 and Colt M1911), vehicle sounds, and ambience. He cooperated on Foley with the sound engineer Mathias Schlegel. During the development, unused sounds Holmquist had created for Smash Hit were used as placeholders. He composed and performed the game's soundtrack with Andreas Baw on the drums, Hans Kristian Durán providing vocals for the song "Löckelle", and Håkan Åkesson mastering the songs at Nutid Studio.

=== Early access and release ===
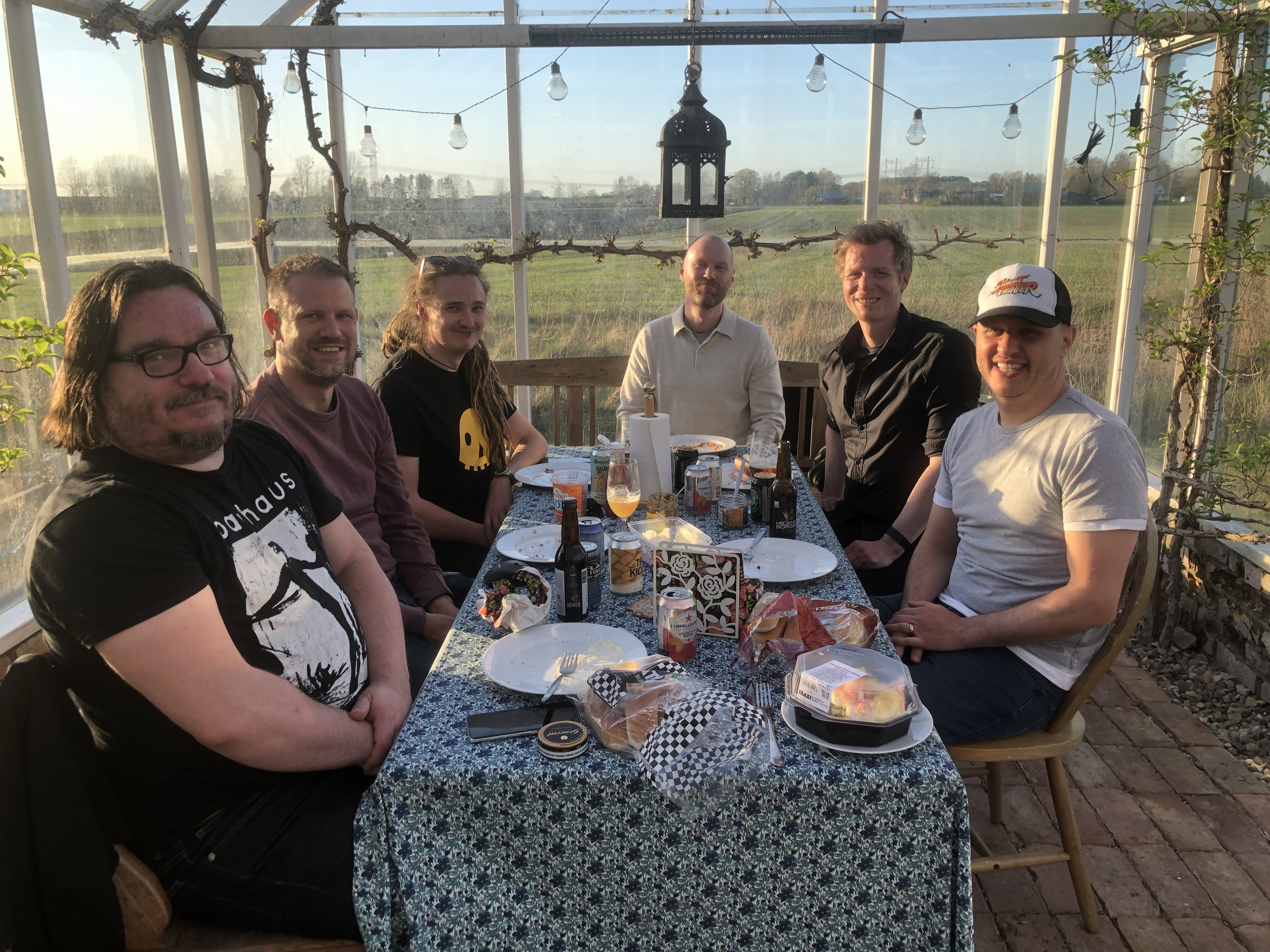
From left to right, Tuxedo Labs's Emil Bengtsson, Marcus Dawson, Olle Lundahl, Jim Winberg, Dennis Gustafsson, and John Kearney on Teardown's release day

Gustafsson established the company Tuxedo Labs in Malmö in 2019. On 1 October 2019, he revealed the game as Teardown. The announcement was coupled with the release of a walkthrough video, a website, and a preparatory Steam storefront page. Later development updates shared by Gustafsson documented dynamic weather, further vehicles and levels, and other content being added. The game's online presence grew its pre-release popularity substantially, and Gustafsson thus chose not to use any traditional marketing techniques. Another trailer showcased Teardown during the Gamescom Opening Night Live in August 2020. Gustafsson released an early version of the game via Steam Early Access on 29 October 2020. By this time, the development team comprised Gustafsson, Bengtsson, and five contractors. They later brought on John Kearney as Teardown's art director. The early access phase was to last approximately one year, subject to change depending on player feedback, to allow for the addition of more content. The initial release included one half of the campaign, dubbed Part 1. Part 2, released on 2 December 2021, added further missions and tools, enemy robots, and tornadoes. The completed game was released on 21 April 2022. The trailer announcing the release date, published earlier that month, highlighted the updates made during the early access phase.

=== Post-launch content and console ports ===
On 1 July 2022, Tuxedo Labs was acquired by Saber Interactive, itself a subsidiary of Embracer Group. Saber Interactive justified its purchase by arguing that Teardown's technology could be expanded into a larger platform and compete with Minecraft and Roblox. By the time the acquisition was announced in August 2022, Gustafsson had grown the studio to six people, taken the title of chief technology officer, and hired as the chief executive officer (CEO) Marcus Dawson, the former CEO of Illusion Labs. Gustafsson said these changes allowed him to drop his managerial role and focus more on development. Tuxedo Labs released a free expansion, Art Vandals, in December 2022. It was developed using the modding system to introduce players to its capabilities. In March 2023, the game's price was raised from US$20 to $30 while further free updates, including online multiplayer, were in development. At the time, Tuxedo Labs did not plan to release purchasable downloadable content (DLC).

In May 2023, Tuxedo Labs announced that Teardown, published by Saber Interactive, was coming to PlayStation 5 and Xbox Series X/S later that year. In September, the company announced 15 November as the release date, alongside four purchasable DLC packs. The console versions comprise three editions: The "Standard Edition" contains the base game, the "Deluxe Edition" also includes the Time Campers and Folkrace DLC packs, and the "Ultimate Edition" adds two further upcoming DLC packs. The DLC is also purchasable separately and as part of a season pass. On the Xbox Series X/S, pre-ordering the game grants access to bonus content, while the "Standard Edition" on the PlayStation 5 was included in the game catalogue of the PlayStation Plus subscription service. The console launch trailer was narrated by the actor Owen Wilson.

Time Campers was released alongside the console ports, while the pre-order-exclusive Löckelle Motor Park content pack became free DLC in December 2023. When Saber Interactive was divested in March 2024, Embracer Group retained Tuxedo Labs as a direct subsidiary. Folkrace was released in June 2024. With the continued reorganisation of Embracer Group, Tuxedo Labs was announced as being spun off as part of Coffee Stain Group in May 2025. Tuxedo Labs and Coffee Stain Publishing released the third DLC pack, The Greenwash Gambit, in June 2025. The multiplayer component was announced in March 2025 and, following a lengthy public test phase, it was released for the PC version on 12 March 2026. Thereafter, the game reached a record 15,172 concurrent player count on Steam. A multiplayer update for consoles and a multiplayer racing mode are set to release later in 2026. Cross-platform play support was not planned. Relics of Barkuna, the fourth DLC pack, was released in June 2026. With the season pass fulfilled, it was deprecated on Steam alongside the "Ultimate Edition", which was replaced by the "Ultimate Bundle" that also includes all DLC packs. The multiplayer update to was extended to consoles in September.

== Reception ==
=== Previews ===
During its early access phase, Teardown was well received. Graham Smith of Rock Paper Shotgun lauded the game's voxel destruction mechanics and their intrinsic value to the gameplay, considering the destruction technology to outperform prior destruction-focused games like Red Faction: Guerrilla. GameStar's Christian Just praised the game's sandbox approach to level destruction and the technology's level of detail. Rick Lane of Bit-Tech called the game's puzzles "highly open ended yet beautifully challenging". Smith regarded the game as rarely frustrating due to its use of quick saves, which Andy Kelly of PC Gamer echoed. Smith also described the successful completion of a level within sixty seconds, after having spent up to an hour planning the route, as rewarding. Likewise, Nathan Grayson of Kotaku stated that it felt "amazing" to complete a level with only a few seconds left. Connor Sheridan of GamesRadar+ regarded the game's music as "slick". Lane noted that the visual style was "splendid". Eurogamer's Robert Purchese was amazed by the unexpected existence of a story that made it more than merely "a game about smashing stuff up". PC Gamer's Natalie Clayton praised Teardown's ray-traced lighting implementation and overall art style as "something utterly gorgeous". She believed that its mod support had transformed it "from a fun curiosity into a worthy successor to the king of physics sandboxes, Garry's Mod" and that it "never gets old".

With only Part 1 released at the time, Just felt that the game lacked varying content, making it feel "lifeless and dull" after an initial "wow effect". He called the game's worlds "oddly cold and empty" and further cited a perceived lack of optimisation. Smith criticised some imprecise interactions between the game's elements, such as the player colliding with "glitchy" object edges, or large, partially destroyed structures being supported by very few voxels due to the game not accounting for compressive stress.

=== Reviews ===
Reception

Aggregate score
Aggregator	Score
Metacritic	PC: 80/100; PS5: 78/100; XSXS: 85/100

Review scores
Publication	Score
GameSpot	7/10
NME	4/5
PC Gamer (US)	90/100
PC Games (DE)	9/10
Push Square	8/10
Shacknews	9/10
CD-Action	9/10
Eurogamer.de	7/10
Eurogamer.it	7/10
GamingBolt	PC: 7/10; PS5: 8/10
Multiplayer.it	7.5/10
Pure Xbox	8/10

Teardown received "generally favorable reviews" on all platforms, according to the review aggregator website Metacritic, which calculated weighted average ratings of 80/100 for PCs, 78/100 for the PlayStation 5, and 85/100 for the Xbox Series X/S. Clayton, who reviewed the game for PC Gamer, labelled the game "the most creative sandbox platform since Garry's Mod" and an "endlessly delightful destruction sandbox". Stefania Netti of Eurogamer.it similarly called it "the interactive fulcrum par excellence, that twisted gratification that never tires". Dawid Biel of CD-Action described interactions with fires, explosions, and destruction of large structures as "mesmerising". Teardown's physics were praised as "superb" by GameSpot's Alessandro Barbosa, who felt that "the chaotic nature of its physics are a consistent source of joy". However, Netti and Annika Menzel of PC Games lamented that buildings could remain unrealistically supported by very few voxels. Benjamin Schmädig of Eurogamer.de cited this as a stark contrast to the ease with which some materials could be destroyed. John Cantees of GamingBolt found the interactions with some objects "finicky" and criticised "floaty" controls while jumping.

Cantees found the voxel art style apt for the game and its destruction-based gameplay. Biel regarded it "extremely visually attractive". Chris Jarrard reviewed Teardown for Shacknews and called the game "an absolute stunner", citing its use of ray tracing for lighting, shadows, and reflections, bounce lighting, ambient occlusion, and diffuse reflections. He further believed that the fire propagation exceeded that of his prior favourite, Far Cry 2. The PlayStation 5 version was applauded for its performance by Push Square's Christian Kobza, Digital Foundry's Alex Battaglia, and Multiplayer.it's Francesco Serino. Mohd Usaid of GamingBolt noted how the PC-centric user interface had been poorly adapted for the platform.

Barbosa criticised the pace of upgrades in the campaign, feeling that it hindered the "ability to tear maps apart in entertaining ways" and prevented drastic changes in mission objectives. Kobza similarly felt that the first half of the game had too little variety of mission objectives, although the second half performed better in that regard. Menzel cited monotony in returning to the same maps with different mission objectives. In contrast, Jason Coles of NME found satisfaction in discovering new shortcuts on previously played levels after unlocking the planks. Jarrard exclaimed that completing a mission with only seconds left was "a legitimate rush".

Barbosa felt that the challenge modes had no lasting appeal. Clayton, Kobza, and Pure Xbox's PJ O'Reilly bemoaned a lack of a multiplayer component, while O'Reilly additionally lamented the limited availability of mods on consoles. She considered the modding scene to be the game's "enduring lifeblood" and believed that it made Teardown a spiritual successor to Garry's Mod. Coles similarly believed that mods would be Teardown's legacy. Menzel and Netti warned of possible motion sickness, and Cantees faulted an inconsistent performance. Schmädig found the game's gamepad support cumbersome.

=== Sales ===
Teardown was among Steam's best-selling games in the first few days of its early access phase. In the same time frame, the game received more than 1,800 player reviews, of which 96% were positive, indicating an "overwhelmingly positive" reception. Gustafsson attributed the early success to the popularity of his Twitter videos. By August 2022, Teardown had sold 1.1 million copies. In December 2023, following the release of the console versions, the game had 2.5 million players.

=== Accolades ===
Teardown received nominations for multiple year-end accolades, winning "Excellence in Design" at the 2021 Independent Games Festival. It was an honourable mention for "Best Technology" at the 2023 Game Developers Choice Awards. Shacknews named Teardown the best early access game of 2020 and, after its release, the best PC game of 2022. Rock Paper Shotgun's editors cited the game as one of their favourites of 2020, while GameSpot cited it as one of 2022's best games. Kotaku regarded it as one of the year's best games for the Steam Deck platform. PCGamesN said Teardown was one of the "best relaxing games in 2022", while PC Gamer named it the year's best sandbox game. On PC Gamer's list of the "top 100 PC games", Teardown ranked #25 in 2022 and #95 in 2023. The site's Morgan Park championed the game as "one of the best games of the decade so far". In Wired, Reece Rogers named the game as one of the best on PlayStation Plus in January 2024. Google DeepMind used Teardown, among other games, to train SIMA, a machine learning model that can navigate and interact with arbitrary video game worlds on command.

Year	Award	Category	Result	Ref.
2021	Independent Games Festival	Excellence in Design	Won	
2021	Independent Games Festival	Seumas McNally Grand Prize	Nominated	
2022	Golden Joystick Awards	Best Indie Game	Nominated	
2022	Golden Joystick Awards	PC Game of the Year	Nominated	
2022	Golden Joystick Awards	Ultimate Game of the Year	Nominated	
2022	The Steam Awards	Most Innovative Gameplay	Nominated	
2023	D.I.C.E. Awards	Outstanding Technical Achievement	Nominated	
