= Smash Hit =

2014 video game

- Developer: Mediocre
- Publisher: Mediocre
- Designer: Henrik Johansson
- Programmer: Dennis Gustafsson
- Artist: Henrik Johansson
- Composer: Douglas Holmquist
- Platforms: Android; iOS; Oculus Go; Oculus Rift; Samsung Gear VR
- Release: 6 March 2014: Android, iOS; 6 March 2014; Oculus Rift, Samsung Gear VR; 2015; Oculus Go; 2018
- Genre: Rail shooter
- Modes: Single-player, multiplayer

Smash Hit is a 2014 rail shooter video game developed and published by the Swedish indie game studio Mediocre. Through the game's 11 levels, the player takes a first-person perspective, shooting metal balls to destroy glass obstacles. Additionally, the player can shoot up to five balls at once by smashing a consecutive sequence of crystals and gather power-ups that are activated for a limited amount of time. The game also includes a one-time in-game purchase that allows the player to start from any unlocked checkpoint as well as play a variety of different gamemodes.

The game's development began in 2012. Dennis Gustafsson programmed the game and created its physics engine and acoustics, while Henrik Johansson designed its levels. Douglas Holmquist was hired to compose the soundtrack and sound effects. The game was released for free on iOS and Android on 6 March 2014. A virtual reality adaptation of the game was released for platforms in 2015 and 2018. Smash Hit received positive reviews from critics, who praised its physics engine, graphics, music, and sound effects. CNET and Apple Inc. listed it as one of the best mobile games of 2014. After Mediocre closed in 2017, Gustafsson and Holmquist worked on the 2022 video game Teardown.

== Gameplay ==
A screenshot of the game, with the player breaking a glass obstacle in order to progress further in the game

Smash Hit is a first-person 3D rail shooter and endless runner video game in which the player travels forward and must shoot metal balls to destroy glass obstacles while conserving their supply, as the game ends when the player runs out of balls. Colliding with an obstacle results in the loss of ten balls. The player can gain more balls by shooting at crystals, with the number of balls given depending on the crystal's shape. As the player advances, dynamic music plays in the background.

By default, the player shoots one ball at a time, but can shoot up to five at once by smashing a consecutive sequence of crystals; missing a crystal or sustaining damage breaks the combo mechanic and resets the number of balls to one. Regardless of the number fired, each shot only deducts one ball from the player's ammunition. The player can also gather power-ups and activate them for a limited amount of time. Each power-up gives a special effect when activated, such as providing the player an endless supply of balls, making all their balls explosive—which causes larger chunks of glass to break—or slowing down the game's speed.

Smash Hit has 11 levels, each with a different appearance. As the game progresses, the levels become more difficult. The game covers the player's distance as their score. By default, the player starts at the beginning of the first level; however, a one-time in-game purchase allows the player to start from the beginning of any unlocked level and sync progress via a cloud system such as iCloud.

After its release, Smash Hit introduced three different game modes, including a training mode, as well as two multiplayer modes: versus, where two players compete on the same device, and cooperative, where two players complete the game together on the same device.

== Development and release ==
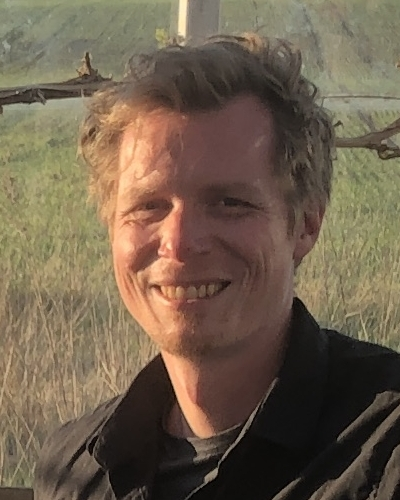
Dennis Gustafsson, the co-founder of Mediocre

Smash Hit was developed and published by the Swedish indie studio Mediocre, co-founded by Dennis Gustafsson and Henrik Johansson in 2010. The studio previously developed the Sprinkle video game series and Granny Smith. Gustafsson programmed the game, while Johansson was its artist and level designer. Douglas Holmquist composed the game's soundtrack and produced its sound effects.

Gustafsson and Johansson began developing the game in 2012, and Holmquist joined the team in January 2013. Mediocre tasked Holmquist with creating an electronic soundtrack and listed Gold Panda's Fifth Ave, Shigeto's Look at all the Smiling Faces, and Robot Koch's Water and Solutions as reference tracks. Gustafsson helped Holmquist by working on the game's acoustics. Instead of using OpenAL or OpenSL audio application programming interfaces, he opted for creating a custom mixer to fully control the game's surrounding effects and audio processing. Gustafsson implemented the game's reverberation and echoing systems, and the game's camera is harmonised with the dynamic music.

Gustafsson also worked on creating the game's physics engine, wanting the glass shattering system to be "fully procedural" and reliable. He was satisfied with the end result but admitted that it was not realistic, considering that the glass shatters at the point where it is hit instead of shattering at its most unsteady point. The game's obstacles are procedurally generated and were written with the Lua programming language, while shadows were based on the ambient occlusion rendering technique.

In November 2013, the developers announced the game to the public. It was released for free on iOS and Android on 6 March 2014. The game's music initially had 33 tracks that were combined in various ways; Holmquist composed seven more in May 2014 and three after the introduction of new game modes in July 2014. Smash Hit was the most downloaded video game on iOS in March 2014, while on Android devices, it was the sixth most downloaded. The game was downloaded more than 280 million times by October 2024.

== Reception ==
Reception

Aggregate score
Aggregator	Score
Metacritic	80/100

Review scores
Publication	Score
Gamezebo	4/5
MacLife	4/5
Pocket Gamer	3/5
TouchArcade	4.5/5
148Apps	4.5/5
AppSpy	4/5
Common Sense Media	5/5
Multiplayer.it	8/10
Shpil	9.5/10

Smash Hit has received "generally favourable" reviews, according to the review aggregator Metacritic. CNET and Apple Inc. rated Smash Hit as one of the best mobile video games of 2014. Smash Hit received honourable mentions for the Independent Games Festival's 2015 Main Competition.

The game's physics engine and gameplay were praised by reviewers. (Note: Attributed to the following reviews:) They have, however, commented that the game does not offer much beyond its shooting mechanics, which Tommaso Pugliese of Multiplayer.it considered a negative aspect of the game. Denis Zaichenko of Shpil described the physics engine as flawless and noted that the game differs from other rail shooters because of the engine and rate of fire mechanics. Common Sense Media praised the game as mesmerising with "a therapeutic experience". Pocket Gamer named Smash Hit as one of the hardest mobile video games. Writing for Gamezebo, Nadia Oxford also said that the player's hitbox could be hard to track down. Harry Slater of Pocket Gamer saw the game as entertaining but irritating; according to Alex Beech of AppSpy, the checkpoint system ultimately undermined the endless mode scoreboard idea. In a review for MacLife, Andrew Hayward added that initial levels could be toiling to players without the in-game purchase when constantly replaying the game.

Reviewers also commended the game's visuals, music, and sound effects. (Note: Attributed to the following reviews:) Michelle Starr of CNET described the glass-shattering visual effect as impressive, while Pugliese viewed them as detailed and naturalistic. Hayward commended the game's minimalist looks as well as the glass-shattering effects. Starr also said that the game's graphics and mechanics were refined in contrast to Sprinkle and Granny Smith. Chris Carter of TouchArcade hailed the game's graphics as fable-looking. Charlie Miller of 148Apps saw the shattering sounds as pleasing while describing the game's music as fitting its ambience. Pugliese also noted that the game's music was well adapted to its graphics.

== Legacy ==
Mediocre released an adaptation of the game for Samsung Gear VR, titled Smash Hit VR, for free in 2015. Gustafsson commented that the idea for a VR version was brought up before the game was initially released for mobile; once the virtual reality headset gained popularity, the developers thought it was a "good fit". He also revealed that the levels had to be partially redesigned due to the revamped shooting system. Ian Hamilton of UploadVR said that the virtual reality adaptation of the game is an enjoyable presentation to virtual reality. The game was also later released for Oculus Rift and Oculus Go headsets in 2015 and 2018, respectively. Computer scientists Margherita Antona and Constantine Stephanidis reported that no differences in difficulty were seen between the mobile and virtual reality versions of Smash Hit.

Mediocre developed another video game involving balls, PinOut, and released it in October 2016. The studio was closed in 2017, after which Gustafsson began working on creating a game using destructible environments with voxels. He hired Mediocre's additional designer, Emil Bengtsson, to work on his game, Teardown. Like Smash Hit, the gameplay of Teardown was modelled around the game's technology. Holmquist composed its music and sound effects, while unused sounds from Smash Hit were used as placeholders during the development. Teardown was released in 2022.

An Apple Arcade version of the game, titled Smash Hit+, was released by Mediocre on 3 October 2024. The version removed the in-game purchase option and ads from the game and made all game modes available to the player from the beginning.
