= Miner Wars 2081 =

2012 video game

- A promotional poster for the game
- Developer: Keen Software House
- Platform: Microsoft Windows
- Release: 28 November 2012
- Genres: First-person shooter, survival
- Modes: Single-player, multiplayer

Miner Wars 2081 is a six degrees of freedom action-survival space-shooter simulation game produced by Keen Software House. The gameplay offers a choice of single player, co-op, and deathmatch multi-player. The game is set in the year 2081, 11 years after the destruction of all planetary objects in the Solar System. The story introduces the player to many types of missions: rescue, exploration, revenge, base defense, theft, transportation, stealth, search and destroy, pure harvesting or racing. A multiplayer spin-off game, Miner Wars Arena, was also released in 2012.

== Gameplay ==
The player controls a mining ship on a trek adventure across the inner Solar System. Miner Wars 2081 is an action-oriented game, set in a fully destructible and open-world environment, which remains persistent as players complete missions or play online with others. Realism and survival is the key aspect of gameplay. Inventory and the way players use resources such as fuel, ammunition, oxygen, ore, and weapons is important when surrounded by dozens of warring factions. The game features both competitive and co-operative multiplayer. Players are able to complete the entire story campaign with multiple online allies.

== Plot ==
The game is set in the year 2081, 11 years after the destruction of Earth. Being so early in space technology and colonization, the people of Earth are ill-equipped to survive in space indefinitely. Mining colonies previously established in space allowed some 120,000 people to live in space and continue the species.

== Development ==
Development on Miner Wars began in 2002 as a side project by Marek Rosa, the founder and CEO of Keen Software House. In 2009, the project began full-time work and a production team was formed. Originally planned for release in 2011, the production team continued to grow in 2010, and there are currently around 10 core developers both working internally at their headquarters in Prague, and externally in America. The website has undergone several changes, and collects regular feedback from gamers through the forums.

Miner Wars 2081 is running on the VRAGE Voxel game engine built and tailored specifically for the title. The company is also working on the development of VRAGE 2.0, the newest version of the engine and as it has been announced it will be used for the development of their project called Space Engineers.

=== Release ===
In October 2010, the pre-alpha version of Miner Wars 2081 was released to the public, with a free demo version and discounted pre-order version. Miner Wars 2081 is available for Microsoft Windows, and was later released on Xbox Live Arcade.

In October 2012, it was approved for distribution by Valve's Steam Greenlight program.

As of January 17, 2013, the Steam version was patched so that no internet connection is required for single player, but still required for multiplayer and to access the editor. Non-Steam versions however, still require an active internet connection during installation and game play. Valid keys from other vendors can be registered on minerwars.com where a Steam key can then be generated at no extra cost .

=== Source code ===
In March 2013, the game's source code has been released for easier modding purposes only. Content and assets are still proprietary and commercially sold.

== Reception ==
The game received mixed reviews from critics. The most negative review was published by Eurogamer which gave 3/10. Eurogamer criticised Keen Software House that they didn't keep promises to players. Another point of criticism was technical processing and story.

The most positive review was published by Gamesite.Sk, which gave the game 77%. It praised the story, world, engine and co-op mode of the game. On the other hand it criticised that the engine wasn't used fully, there were bugs and that the game is sometimes stereotypical.
