= Miner Wars Arena =

2012 video game

- Developer: Keen Software House
- Engine: Unity
- Platforms: Windows; OS X
- Release: 28 August 2012
- Genre: Action
- Modes: Single-player, multiplayer

Miner Wars Arena is a 2012 action video game developed by Keen Software House. It is a spin-off to Miner Wars 2081. The game is inspired by Tunneler (1991). The game is set in 2090 when the Solar System underwent a political breakdown and humanity is fighting for resources on asteroids.

== Gameplay ==
The gameplay is very similar to Tunneler. The player controls a mining ship and his goal is to defeat his enemies in a bed-rock covered arena. There are multiple game modes. In skirmish, players set up custom battles. Tournament mode consists of 15 levels. In every level, the player has a different weapon and ship. There is also a split-screen multiplayer mode which is limited to 2 AI opponents. The special edition also contains a "protect the generator" mode.

Players can choose from 3 different ships and 5 types of weapons. There are also 10 possible upgrades and power-ups. Player can also rank up to 12 military ranks.
