= Cube World =

2019 video game

- Developer: Picroma
- Publisher: Picroma
- Designer: Wolfram von Funck
- Artist: Sarah von Funck
- Platform: Windows
- Release: September 30, 2019
- Genre: Action role-playing
- Modes: Single-player, multiplayer

Cube World is an action role-playing game developed and published by Picroma for Microsoft Windows. Wolfram von Funck, the game's designer, began developing the game in June 2011, and was later joined by his wife, Sarah. An alpha version of the game was released on July 2, 2013, but saw sparse updates and communication from von Funck, with many considering the game to be vaporware until he officially released it on September 30, 2019.

== Gameplay ==
A mage character on the overworld

In Cube World, the player explores a large voxel-based world. It contains dungeons, including caverns and overworld castles, as well as biomes including grasslands, snowlands, deserts, and oceans. Players can use items such as hang gliders and boats to traverse the world more quickly.

The game features character creation, which involves the player first choosing a race and sex, then customising the look of the character. The player then chooses one of four classes: warrior, rogue, ranger, or mage, each of which have access to unique armour, weapons, and abilities. The world is populated with monsters and creatures that can be killed for better armor and weapons, which results in stronger stats and abilities and allows players to choose specializations which best suit their playstyle, such as warriors being able to choose between focusing on damage or defensive abilities, or mages focusing on damage or healing abilities. Players can also tame animals, such as sheep or turtles, which fight alongside them, or, in some cases, can be ridden to traverse the world more quickly. Crafting is also a part of the game; it allows players to create food, potions, weapons, and armor, as well as cosmetics.

== Development ==
Cube World began development in June 2011, with designer Wolfram von Funck describing it as a 3D voxel-based game with a focus on exploration and role-playing game elements, citing games such as The Legend of Zelda, Secret of Mana, and World of Warcraft as inspiration. He was later joined by his wife, Sarah von Funck, who contributed the game's sprites and assisted in implementing new content. In January 2012, it was erroneously reported that Minecraft's developer Mojang had hired von Funck to help support him in developing Cube World.

An alpha version of Cube World was first released on Picroma's website on July 2, 2013, but was eventually made unable to be repurchased. At the time, the game's download server suffered a DDoS attack, an unexpected event which von Funck later described as traumatizing. During its alpha release, many players were concerned about further development of the game due to the general lack of updates from von Funck, with many considering the game to be vaporware, despite him stating several times during development that the game was still being worked on. In September 2019, von Funck announced that the game would be officially released via Steam on September 30, and that purchasers of the alpha release would receive a Steam key for free.

In May 2023, nearly four years after release and since the last update, von Funck announced the development of Cube World Omega, the name being a reference to the alpha version of the game and his intent to "develop it in the spirit of that version, but with a new engine and new features." Omega is to include a new graphics engine, procedurally generated characters, and a new GUI, along with alpha features that were dropped in the full release, like experience, leveling, and skill trees. Cube World Omega went into a closed beta phase on October 6, 2026.

== Reception ==
The full release of the game has been criticized for its region-based progression system and balancing issues. James Davenport of PC Gamer criticized the repetitiveness of the game, calling it "shallow" and "boring". Luke Plunkett of Kotaku wrote that although the world was "very pretty", it is "badly in need of a tutorial" and "somehow worse than its alpha". Some reviewers commented that the game could not live up to fans' expectations after an extended wait. However, the alpha version was praised by Rock Paper Shotgun for its compulsion loop and visuals.
