= PinOut =

2016 mobile video game

- Developer: Mediocre
- Publisher: Mediocre
- Designer: Emil Bengtsson
- Programmer: Dennis Gustafsson
- Artist: Henrik Johansson
- Composer: Douglas Holmquist
- Platforms: Android, iOS
- Release: October 27, 2016
- Genre: Pinball
- Mode: Single-player

PinOut is a 2016 pinball video game developed and published by the Swedish indie game studio Mediocre. It was released on 27 October 2016 for Android and iOS devices. The goal of the game is to propel a ball in the pin machine as far as possible before time runs out. After the first seven levels the endless mode begins.

== Gameplay ==
The game has the basic appearance of a conventional pinball game, with a rolling ball propelled upward on the play field by hitting it with flippers. However, unlike a conventional pinball game, the play field extends upwards endlessly. The display follows the ball as it moves. Multiple flippers are placed throughout the play field. There is no drain; play is limited by a timer. The challenge is to go as far as possible up the play field, within the available time.

The player controls the flippers by tapping the left or right of the screen. The player can also hold the flippers to "catch" the ball, for a more precise shot.

To gain additional time, the player can hit glowing dots with the ball, gaining 1 second per dot. If the time runs out, the game ends. There are ten checkpoints in the game. With an in-app purchase, the player can enable restarting from past checkpoints, restoring their progress to that point. Otherwise, players must start at the beginning.

If the player makes it past the main play fields, there is an "Overtime" mode, where the player keeps playing the same course until time expires.

=== Minigames ===
There are four different minigames (one of these is an easter egg referencing Does not Commute, another Mediocre AB game) which, upon losing the minigame, the resulting score will be added to the timer. These minigames appear in a small area at the top of the screen, reminiscent of the "video mode" minigames in hybrid electronic pinball games.

=== Power-ups ===
Like the minigames, power-ups appear as colored orbs on the playing field, and are obtained when the ball touches the orb. The game then offers the player a choice between two of the following:

- Slow Motion — temporarily slows the ticks of the timer.
- Time Freeze — stops the timer for 10 slips of the flippers.
- Motion Link — for a limited time, the timer only ticks when the ball is in motion.
- Push — temporarily allows the player to move the ball in any direction.
- Warp — instantly skips the player ahead to a further section of the level.
- Time Doubler — temporarily makes the glowing dots worth 2 seconds instead of 1.
- Random — one of the other power-ups listed above is granted.

== Reception ==
Reception

Aggregate score
Aggregator	Score
Metacritic	81/100

Review scores
Publication	Score
Gamezebo	4.5/5
Pocket Gamer	9/10
TouchArcade	4/5

Metacritic gave the game an average score of 81 out of 100, indicating "generally favorable reviews". Gamezebo gave PinOut a rating of 4.5 stars, praising its graphics and soundtrack, while criticizing the timer as oppressive. Pocket Gamer praised the originality, game-play, and aesthetics, but said it can be "a little tough".

== See also ==
- Smash Hit – another game from Mediocre involving balls smashing into glass.
