= Voxel =

Element representing a value on a grid in three dimensional space

A set of voxels in a stack, with a single voxel shaded

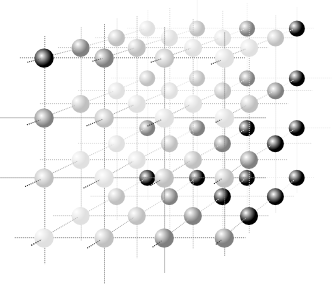
Illustration of a voxel grid containing color values

In computing, a voxel is a representation of a value on a three-dimensional regular grid, akin to the two-dimensional pixel. Voxels are frequently used in the visualization and analysis of medical and scientific data (e.g. geographic information systems (G.I.S.)). Voxels also have technical and artistic applications in video games, largely originating with surface rendering in Outcast (1999). Minecraft (2011) makes use of an entirely voxelated world to allow for a fully destructible and constructable environment. Voxel art, of the sort used in Minecraft and elsewhere, is a style and format of 3D art analogous to pixel art.

As with pixels in a 2D bitmap, voxels themselves do not typically have their position (i.e. coordinates) explicitly encoded with their values. Instead, rendering systems infer the position of a voxel based upon its position relative to other voxels (i.e., its position in the data structure that makes up a single volumetric image). Some volumetric displays use voxels to describe their resolution. For example, a cubic volumetric display might be able to show 512×512×512 (or about 134 million) voxels.

In contrast to pixels and voxels, polygons are often explicitly represented by the coordinates of their vertices (as points). A direct consequence of this difference is that polygons can efficiently represent simple 3D structures with much empty or homogeneously filled space, while voxels excel at representing regularly sampled spaces that are non-homogeneously filled.

One of the definitions is:

Voxel is an image of a three-dimensional space region limited by given sizes, which has its own nodal point coordinates in an accepted coordinate system, its own form, its own state parameter that indicates its belonging to some modeled object, and has properties of modeled region.

This definition has the following advantage. If fixed voxel form is used within the whole model it is much easier to operate with voxel nodal points (i.e. three coordinates of this point). Yet, there is the simple form of record: indexes of the elements in the model set (i.e. integer coordinates). Model set elements in this case are state parameters, indicating voxel belonging to the modeled object or its separate parts, including their surfaces.

== Etymology ==
The word voxel originated by analogy to "pixel", with vo representing "volume" (instead of pixel's "picture") and el representing "element"; a similar formation with el for "element" is the word "texel". The term hypervoxel is a generalization of voxel for higher-dimensional spaces.

== Rendering ==
A volume described as voxels can be visualized either by direct volume rendering or by the extraction of polygon iso-surfaces that follow the contours of given threshold values. The marching cubes algorithm(s) and Inertial frame of reference(s) are often used for iso-surface extraction, however other methods exist as well.

Both ray tracing and ray casting, as well as rasterisation, can be applied to voxel data to obtain 2D raster graphics to depict on a monitor.

=== Incremental error rasterisation ===
Another technique for voxels involves raster graphics where one simply raytraces every pixel of the display into the scene, tracking an error term to determine when to step. A typical implementation will raytrace each pixel of the display starting at the bottom of the screen using what is known as a y-buffer. When a voxel is reached that has a higher y value on the display it is added to the y-buffer overriding the previous value and connected with the previous y-value on the screen interpolating the color values. There is a major downside to voxel rasterization when transformation is applied which causes severe aliasing. The advantage was the ability to rasterise using cheap integer calculations on a CPU without hardware acceleration.

Outcast, and other 1990s video games employed this graphics technique for effects such as reflection and bump-mapping and usually for terrain rendering. Outcast's graphics engine was mainly a combination of a ray casting (heightmap) engine, used to render the landscape, and a texture mapping polygon engine used to render objects. The "Engine Programming" section of the game's credits in the manual has several subsections related to graphics, among them: "Landscape Engine", "Polygon Engine", "Water & Shadows Engine" and "Special effects Engine". Although Outcast is often cited as a forerunner of voxel technology, this is somewhat misleading. The game does not actually model three-dimensional volumes of voxels. Instead, it models the ground as a surface, which may be seen as being made up of voxels. The ground is decorated with objects that are modeled using texture-mapped polygons. When Outcast was developed, the term "voxel engine", when applied to computer games, commonly referred to a ray casting engine (for example the Voxel Space engine). On the engine technology page of the game's website, the landscape engine is also referred to as the "Voxels engine". The engine is purely software-based: it does not rely on hardware-acceleration via a 3D graphics card.

John Carmack also experimented with voxels for the Quake III Arena engine. One such problem cited by Carmack was the lack of graphics cards designed specifically for such rendering requiring them to be software rendered.

Comanche was also the first commercial flight simulation based on voxel technology. NovaLogic used the proprietary Voxel Space engine developed for the company by Kyle Freeman (written entirely in Assembly language) to create open landscapes. This rendering technique allowed for much more detailed and realistic terrain compared to simulations based on vector graphics at that time.

=== Gallery ===
3D rendering of a μCT scan of a leaf piece, resolution c. 40 μm/voxel when viewed at the full size

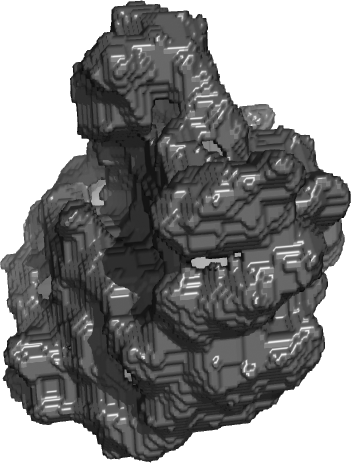
A (smoothed) rendering of a data set of voxels for a macromolecule

Geographic data represented in a voxel-based video game

== Data ==
A voxel represents a single sample, or data point, on a regularly spaced, three-dimensional grid. This data point can consist of a single datum, such as an opacity, or multiple data, such as a color in addition to opacity. A voxel represents only a single point on this grid, not a volume; the space between each voxel is not represented in a voxel-based data set. Depending on the type of data and the intended use for the data set, this missing information may be reconstructed and/or approximated, e.g. via interpolation.

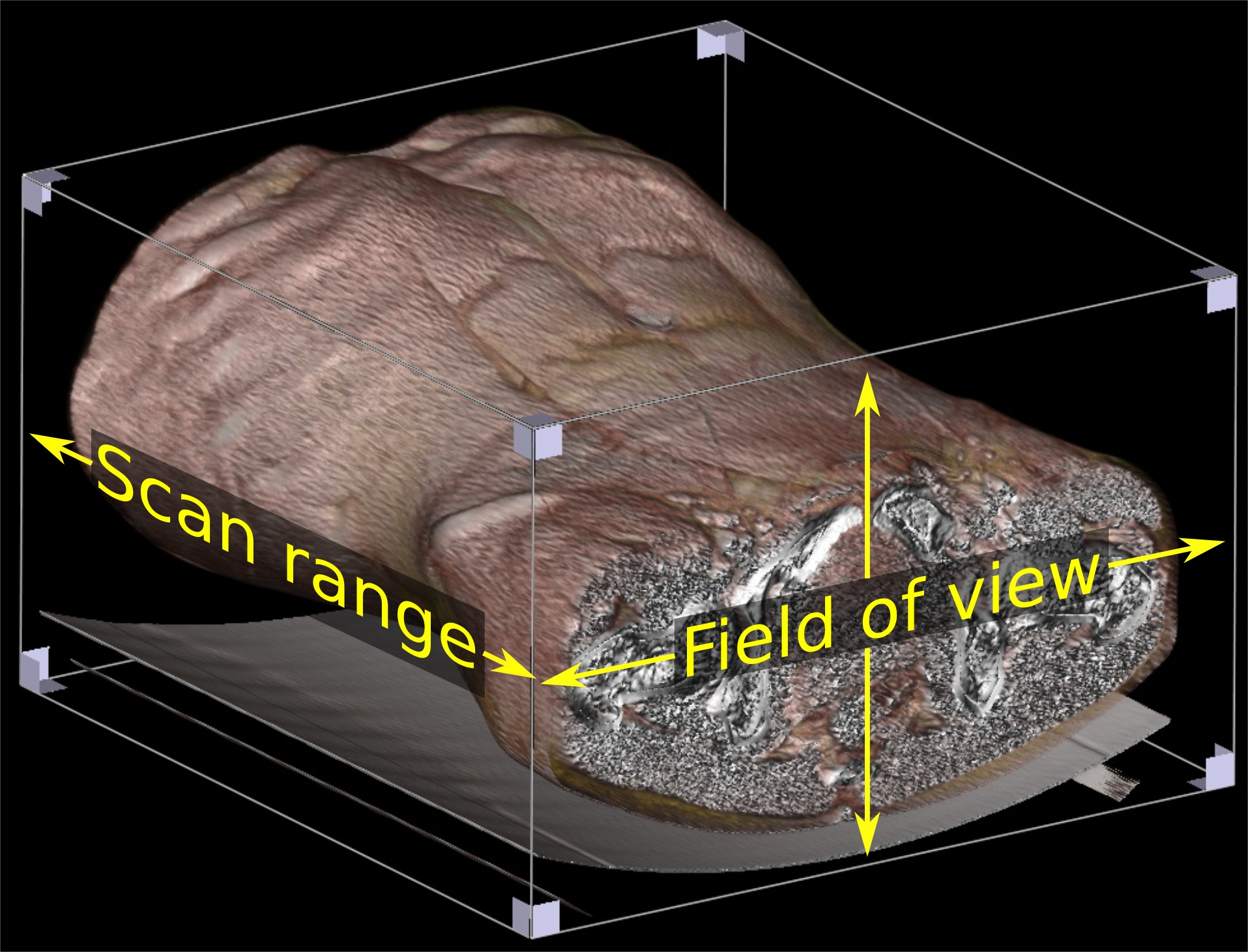
In computed tomography (abdominal CT pictured), voxels are generated by multiplying the field of view (F.O.V.) by the scan range.

The value of a voxel may represent various properties. In C.T. scans, the values are Hounsfield units, giving the opacity of material to X-rays. Different types of value are acquired from M.R.I. or ultrasound.

Voxels can contain multiple scalar values, essentially vector (tensor) data; in the case of ultrasound scans with B-mode and Doppler data, density, and volumetric flow rate are captured as separate channels of data relating to the same voxel positions.

While voxels provide the benefit of precision and depth of reality, they are typically large data sets and are unwieldy to manage given the bandwidth of common computers. However, through efficient compression and manipulation of large data files, interactive visualization can be enabled on consumer market computers.

Other values may be useful for immediate 3D rendering, such as a surface normal vector and color.

== Uses ==
Uses of voxels include volumetric imaging in medicine and representation of terrain in games and simulations. Voxel terrain is used instead of a heightmap because of its ability to represent overhangs, caves, arches, and other 3D terrain features. These concave features cannot be represented in a heightmap due to only the top 'layer' of data being represented, leaving everything below it filled (the volume that would otherwise be the inside of the caves, or the underside of arches or overhangs).

=== Computer games ===
- 3D Dot Game Heroes uses voxels to present Lego-like graphics.
- 7 Days to Die is a voxel-based open-world survival horror game developed by The Fun Pimps Entertainment.
- Ace of Spades used Ken Silverman's Voxlap engine before being rewritten in a bespoke OpenGL engine.
- Amok uses voxels for its environments.
- Armored Fist 3 is a computer game made by NovaLogic that used voxel-based rendering technology.
- Blade Runner is a video game that used voxels to render characters and artifacts.
- Castle Story, a castle-building real-time strategy game in development, has terrain consisting of smoothed voxels.
- Cloudpunk, a cyberpunk adventure game, is almost entirely voxel-based.
- Comanche, a series of computer games made by NovaLogic that used the Voxel Space voxel rasterization for terrain rendering.
- Command & Conquer: Tiberian Sun, Command & Conquer: Red Alert 2 and Command & Conquer: Yuri's Revenge are computer games made by Westwood Studios that used voxels to render most vehicles.
- Crossy Road was released in 2014 for IOS and Andriod and has voxel graphics.
- Crysis, as well as Cryengine 2 and Cryengine 3, use a combination of heightmaps and voxels for their terrain systems.
- Cube World, an action role-playing game, features procedurally generated voxel landscapes.
- Delta Force is a computer game made by NovaLogic that used the in-house Voxel Space rendering engine.
- Donkey Kong Bananza, a 3D platformer, used smoothed voxels for the game's destructible terrain.
- Dual Universe is a single-shard universe M.M.O.R.P.G. that uses voxels to build spaceships, civilizations and space stations.
- Enshrouded is a voxel-based survival R.P.G. by Keen Games released in 2024.
- EverQuest Next and EverQuest Next: Landmark, cancelled M.M.O.R.P.G.s by Sony Online Entertainment, made extensive use of voxels for world creation as well as player-generated content
- Hexplore, a multiplayer role-playing game, uses a voxel engine allowing the player to rotate the isometric rendered playfield.
- Hytale, an early-access sandbox, voxel-based R.P.G. developed by Hypixel Studios.
- Luanti (previously Minetest) is a modifiable sandbox video game that uses voxels to store terrain data, but does not use voxel-rendering techniques. Instead, it uses polygon rendering to display each voxel as a cubic "node".
- Master of Orion III uses voxel graphics to render space battles and star systems. Battles displaying 1000 ships at a time were rendered slowly on computers without hardware graphic acceleration.
- Medieval Engineers is the second voxel-based engineering game by Keen Software House inspired by medieval technology.
- Minecraft is a sandbox video game that uses voxels to store terrain data, but does not use voxel-rendering techniques. Instead it uses polygon rendering to display each voxel as a cubic "block".
- Moonglow Bay is a fishing role-playing video game released in 2021 and developed by Bunnyhug, using voxel art style.
- Miner Wars 2081 is a 6DOF open-world game made by Keen Software House that uses its own VRage voxel-rendering engine to let the user deform the terrain of asteroids allowing tunnels to be formed.
- Nivalis is an upcoming cyberpunk slice-of-life set in voxel-based world, previously featured in Cloudpunk.
- No Man's Sky is a space exploration game consisting of procedurally generated star systems containing explorable planets, moons and asteroids made of voxels. The voxel engine allows for both terrain destruction and creation.
- Outcast, is a third-person action computer game made by former Belgian video game developer Appeal, with landscapes rendered by a voxel engine.
- Planet Coaster is a 2016 construction and management simulation developed and published by Frontier Developments which uses a voxel-based terrain editor.
- Resogun is a 2013 voxel-based side-scrolling shoot-'em-up developed by Finnish developer Housemarque.
- Roblox uses voxels for terrain, as well as for primitive global illumination and shadows.
- Robocraft, a vehicular combat game in which players build combat machines out of voxels and premade components
- Shadow Warrior and Blood use Build engine for first-person shooter voxel rendering, instead of sprites, as an option for many of the items and scenery. Duke Nukem 3D has a fan-created pack in a similar style.
- Shattered Steel featured deforming landscapes using voxel technology.
- Sid Meier's Alpha Centauri uses voxel models to render units.
- SkySaga: Infinite Isles is a voxel-based sandbox M.M.O.R.P.G., being developed by Radiant Worlds and published by Smilegate.
- Space Engineers is a voxel-based sandbox game set in space, developed and published by Keen Software House.
- Starbase, a voxel-based massively multiplayer online role-playing game set in space, being developed and published by Frozenbyte.
- StarMade, a voxel-based sandbox game set in space, developed and published by Robin "Schema" Promesberger.
- Teardown, a voxel-based game featuring fully destructible environments, developed and published by the studio Tuxedo Labs
- The Sandbox
- Trove is a voxel-based M.M.O.R.P.G. with building elements, developed and published by Trion Worlds.
- Vangers is a computer game uses voxels for its two-level terrain system.
- Veloren, is an open source action-adventure role-playing game set in a vast fantasy world.
- Vintage Story, is a sandbox survival game developed and published by Anego Studios.
- Vox, released in 2012, is a voxel-based exploration/R.P.G. game focused on player-generated content.
- Voxatron, a computer game produced by Lexaloffle, is composed and generated fully using voxels.
- Werewolf vs. Comanche is a computer game made by NovaLogic that used voxel-based rendering technology. It was originally bundled and shipped with the Comanche 2 game although they were two separate games.
- Worms 4: Mayhem uses a voxel-based engine to simulate land deformation similar to the older 2D Worms games.

== Editors ==
While scientific volume visualization does not require modifying the actual voxel data, voxel editors can be used to create art (especially 3D pixel art) and models for voxel-based games. Some editors are focused on a single approach to voxel editing while others mix various approaches. Some common approaches are:

- Slice-based: The volume is sliced in one or more axes and the user can edit each image individually using 2D raster editor tools. These generally store color information in voxels.
- Sculpture: Similar to the vector counterpart but with no topology constraints. These usually store density information in voxels and lack color information.
- Building blocks: The user can add and remove blocks just like a construction set toy.

There are a few voxel editors available that are not tied to specific games or engines. They can be used as alternatives or complements to traditional 3D vector modeling.

An animated 7×10×10 voxel art sculpture with 3 frames

== Extensions ==
A generalization of a voxel is the toxel, or temporal voxel. This is used in the case of a 4D data set, such as an image sequence that represents 3D space together with another spatial dimension or a time dimension. In this way, an image could contain 100×100×100×100 voxels, which could be seen as a series of 100 frames of a 100×100×100 volume image (the equivalent for a 3D image would be showing a 2D cross-section of the image in each frame). Although storage and manipulation of such data requires large amounts of memory, it allows the representation and analysis of spacetime systems.

== See also ==
- Maxel – material element
- Hogel - holographic element
- Pixel – picture element
- Plane partition
- Resel – resolution element
- Sparse voxel octree
- Texel – texture element
- Tixel - tactile element
- Tomography
- Volume mesh
- Volume rendering
- Volumetric display
