= Keen Software House =

Independent video game developer

- Type: Video game developer
- Industry: Video games
- Founded: 2010
- Headquarters: Prague, Czech Republic
- Key people: Marek Rosa
- Products: Miner Wars Arena; Miner Wars 2081; Space Engineers; Medieval Engineers; Space Engineers 2
- Number of employees: 50-200
- Website: keenswh.com

Keen Software House is an independent video game developing company based in Prague, Czech Republic. The company was founded by Marek Rosa in 2010.

Keen Software House's technological know-how and proprietary VRAGE game engine has allowed the company to create games that leverage elements of science into the gameplay. The studio's first game, Miner Wars 2081, focused on an open world with destructible terrain, while the second game, Space Engineers, presents volumetric physics as gameplay in a space-based environment focused on engineering, construction, and maintenance of spaceships and stations. The company's proprietary VRAGE game engine powers both of the titles and is currently in iteration 3.0. Additionally, they have created a separate team charged with development of Medieval Engineers — utilizing similar rendering styles, while adding in weight and block-based destruction / deformation with physics calculations set in medieval times. This game offers both a single and multiplayer experience set on planets from Space Engineers but with a territory-based grid system where clans can battle for ground to build on. Realistic mechanical contraptions such as catapults can be created to damage structures in real-time. In January 2025, the studio launched the sequel, Space Engineers 2, on Steam Early Access.

== Games ==
Title	Year	Platform(s)	Genre	Description
Miner Wars Arena	2012	Windows, OS X	Arcade, action	Arcade action game inspired by the game Tunneler.
Miner Wars 2081	2012	Windows, Xbox 360	Space simulator	Six degrees of freedom action game.
Space Engineers	2013 (Alpha), 2016 (Beta), 2019 (Full-release)	Windows, Xbox One, PlayStation 4, PlayStation 5	Sandbox game	A game about engineering, construction and maintenance of space works
Medieval Engineers	2015 (early access), 2020 (Full-release)	Windows	Sandbox game	A game about engineering, construction and maintenance of architectural works and mechanical equipment using medieval technology
Space Engineers 2	2025 (Alpha)	Windows	Sandbox game	A sequel to Space Engineers, the voxel-based game centered on engineering, construction and exploration in space.

=== Miner Wars 2081 ===
The first big project for Keen Software House was Miner Wars 2081, which was presented at Game Developers Conference in 2012. The game received mixed reviews by critics. Miner Wars 2081 is an survival space-shooter set in the year 2081, 10 years after the destruction of all planetary objects in the Solar System. The story introduces the player to many types of missions: rescue, exploration, revenge, base defense, theft, transportation, stealth, search and destroy, pure harvesting or racing.

==== Open source ====
The source code for Miner Wars 2081 was released in March, 2013, under a commercial (non-copyright, restricted-use) license. The code may only be redistributed to allow for "mods" of the original game, and the code must continue to perform a license-ownership check.

=== Space Engineers ===
The studio's second project, Space Engineers, is a voxel-based sandbox game that launched on Steam Early Access on October 23, 2013, and released on February 28, 2019. The game presents the player with an open world star system with planets, moons and asteroids, wherein they can mine resources, build ships, stations and rovers, play with physics, and much more. Space Engineers is a sandbox game about engineering, construction and maintenance of space works. The game had sold more than 500,000 copies by May 6, 2014. Space Engineers was well received by both critics and the gaming community.

During the majority of its developmental life, Space Engineers was updated on a weekly basis based on stated development goals and community feedback. Since its initial launch, the game experienced major updates adding survival mode, multiplayer, planets, dedicated server support, economy, PvE Encounters and much more. Space Engineers is open to community creation and modding.

On October 20, 2014, Keen Software House announced that Space Engineers had sold over 1,000,000 copies.

On May 14, 2015, the development firm provided open access (but not making the game free) to the source code to accelerate mod development.

On February 28, 2019, the game was officially released and continues to enjoy periodic software updates.

In total as of 2024 the game has sold over 5 million copies.

=== Medieval Engineers ===
On January 13, 2015, Keen Software House announced their third title and second engineering game named Medieval Engineers. It was also announced that the game will be available on Steam Early Access.

Medieval Engineers is a sandbox game about engineering, construction and the maintenance of architectural works and mechanical equipment using medieval technology. Players build cities, castles and fortifications; construct mechanical devices and engines; perform landscaping and underground mining.

Medieval Engineers is inspired by real medieval technology and the way people survived and built architectural and mechanical works in medieval times. Medieval Engineers strives to follow the laws of physics and real history and does not use technologies that were not available from the 5th to the 15th century.

=== Space Engineers 2 ===
On November 28, 2024, Keen Software House released their first teaser title for their third engineering game named Space Engineers 2. They released their second teaser on December 5, announcing the date of their final teaser. The final teaser, released December 10, would be the first time the game was referred to by name.

On December 19, 2024, the studio revealed additional details about Space Engineers 2, including the first official trailer and the announcement of the Alpha version.

On January 27, 2025, Space Engineers 2 officially launched in Early Access on Steam.

== VRAGE ==
Keen Software House developed and utilizes a video game engine called VRAGE. VRAGE stands for "volumetric rage" and/or "voxel rage".

The first iteration of VRAGE, VRAGE 1.0, was built and tailored specifically for Miner Wars 2081 and the game's need for destructible voxel terrain and an open-world. With the open source release in 2013 of Miner Wars 2081, the VRAGE 1.0 engine was also open sourced, under a restrictive commercial license. The second iteration of the engine, VRAGE 2.0 is the latest version and powers the studio's latest games, Space Engineers and Medieval Engineers while VRAGE 3.0 is a core feature of Space Engineers 2, planned to release on January 27, 2025.

VRAGE 2.0's core feature is volumetricity within the environment. Volumetric objects are structures composed of block-like modules interlocked in a grid. Volumetric objects behave like real physical objects with mass, inertia and velocity. Individual modules have real volume and storage capacity and can be assembled, disassembled, deformed and destroyed. Due to Medieval Engineers development, VRAGE received a fresh upgrade: structural integrity and DirectX 11 rendering.

On April 25, 2022, Marek Rosa announced that VRAGE 3.0 is expected to add volumetric water on a planetary scale, with support for flow simulation, gravity, pressure, buoyancy, and surface tension, with regular development updates being shown in the company's bi-weekly newsletter.

== Controversies ==
=== Medieval Engineers ===
On March 17, 2020, Keen announced that Medieval Engineers would leave the Early Access stage, even though the game had no major updates since February 2019, and with only an update to fix major bugs and stabilisation on release date. This caused an uproar in the Medieval Engineers community, causing players to leave many negative reviews. The game received an 85 percent negative review rating in March 2020. Medieval Engineers development was restarted in April 2022 as 'Community Edition' by a team of community volunteers.
