= Tixel =

Smallest element of a tactile matrix

A tactile pixel or tixel is the smallest measuring/transmitting element of a tactile matrix. Is a part of haptic technologies.

Design of a tactile pixel consists of a switching transistor and a resistive touch sensor. The electrical connection to the transistors is provided through high-resolution vias.

== Tactile matrix ==
Tactile matrix is a machine-readable system, which provides reading information from its surface, and then later transmitting it to a receiver (exoskeleton interface, tactile capturing software etc.).

== Types of tactile pixels ==
Temperature tactile pixels - transmit the effect of temperature on the receiver. When transmitting a matrix of proportional temperature sensors (tactile temperature matrix) is used.

Pressure tactile pixels (pressure capturing tixels) - transmit the level of pressure on the receiver. When transmitting a force sensor matrix is used.

When a pressure capturing pixel is being used in an exoskeleton-type technology where a signal is being transmitted on a human skin, tactile pixel provides a “feeling of gliding over material” (in case if the delay between transmitting signals isn't longer than an average human brain frequency of receiving information from the outer source).

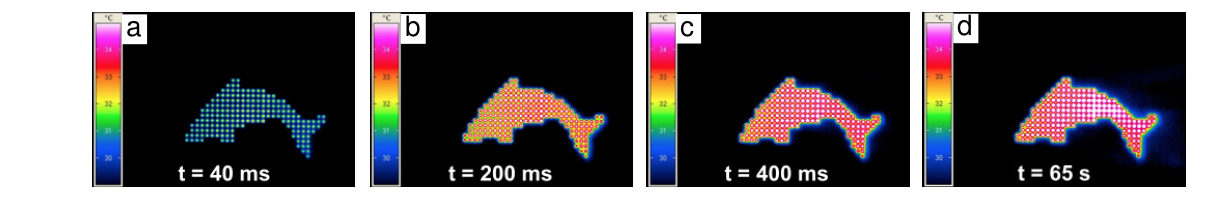
Images in the shape of a dolphin generated by the temperature sensitive matrix.

== Usages of tactile pixels ==
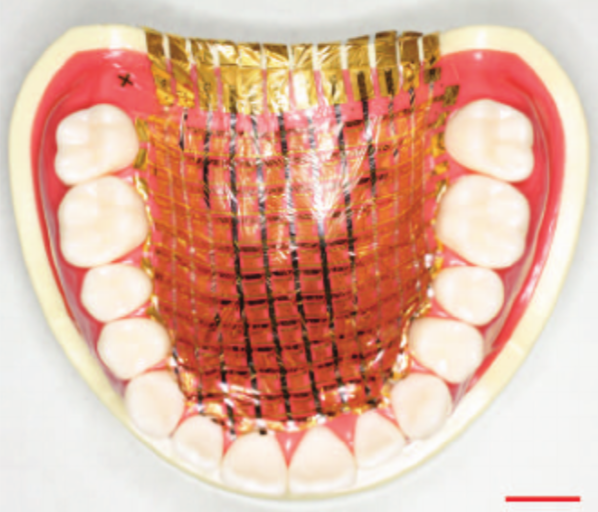
Tactile sensor sheet tightly conforming to a model of the human upper jaw.

Tactile pixels have a wide range of possible usages. As for right now most common fields for them are VR/AR studies (simulating surfaces for gaming) and medicine (laparoscopy, supporting system for blind people). But as it's a fairly new study, those examples of course do not cover the full potential of this technology.

== E-sense ==
In 2011 Swedish company Senseg announced their new technology E-sense. E-sense was supposed to be ready to recreate the feeling of wide range of textures on haptic devices. It used to generate an electric field several millimeters above a devices surface.

The company planned to use tixel technology in a mobile phone production, to more accurately replicate the feeling of a real keyboard and so on. The company also stated that it has the potential to develop in video game industry. As it will make possible to develop games based on feel rather than visuals.

== See also ==
- Computer-mediated reality
- Augmented reality
- Virtual reality
- Haptic technologies
- Exoskeleton
