= Sprinkle Islands =

2013 video game

- App icon
- Developer(s): Mediocre
- Publisher(s): Mediocre
- Designer(s): Henrik Johansson
- Programmer(s): Dennis Gustafsson
- Composer(s): Douglas Holmquist
- Platform(s): Android; iOS
- Release: July 11, 2013
- Genre(s): Puzzle
- Mode(s): Single-player

Sprinkle Islands is a 2013 puzzle video game developed and published by the Swedish indie game studio Mediocre. The game is a part of the Sprinkle video game series and is a sequel to Sprinkle, released in 2011. Released on July 11, 2013, for Android and iOS, Sprinkle Islands garnered a positive reception.

== Gameplay ==
Sprinkle Islands is a physics-based puzzle video game in which the player controls a vehicle similar to a firetruck. In each of the game's 48 levels, the player is given a limited supply of water to extinguish fires within each level. Once all fires are extinguished, the vehicle will progress to another level.

== Release ==
Sprinkle Islands was released for Android and iOS on July 11, 2013.

== Reception ==
Reception

Aggregate score
Aggregator	Score
Metacritic	77/100

Review scores
Publication	Score
Eurogamer	8/10
Gamezebo	3/5
Pocket Gamer	3.5/5
TouchArcade	4/5
148Apps	4/5
AppSpy	4/5
Common Sense Media	4/5

On the review aggregator website Metacritic, Sprinkle Islands has received "generally favorable" reviews with a score of 77/100, based on 13 critics.

Multiple critics gave positive reviews.
