= Space Engineers =

2019 video game

- Developer: Keen Software House
- Publisher: Keen Software House
- Composer: Karel Antonín
- Engine: VRAGE 2.0
- Platforms: Microsoft Windows; Xbox One; PlayStation 4; PlayStation 5
- Release: Windows; February 28, 2019; Xbox One; April 15, 2020; PS4, PS5; May 11, 2023
- Genres: Sandbox, simulation
- Modes: Single-player, multiplayer

Space Engineers is a voxel-based sandbox game, developed and published by Czech independent developer Keen Software House. In 2013, the initial developmental release of the game joined the Steam early access program. During the following years of active development, Space Engineers sold over one million units. As of 2024, the game has sold over 5 million copies. In May 2015, for approximately a year and a half, the game's source code was officially available and maintained by KSH to assist the modding community. On December 15, 2016, the game entered Beta and was later officially released on February 28, 2019.

== Gameplay ==
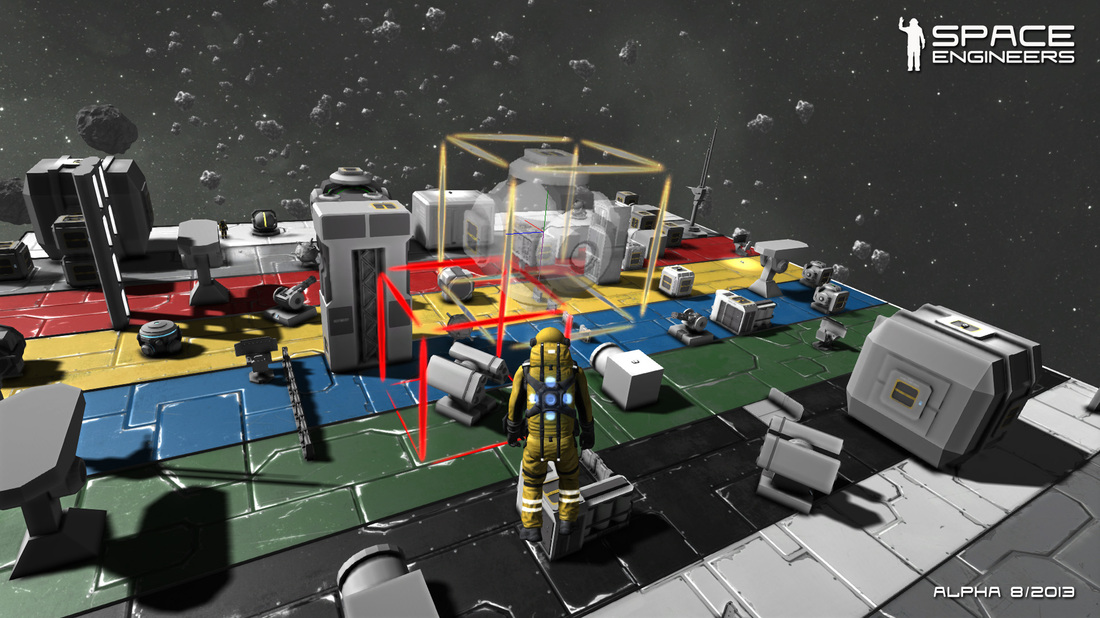
An old 2014 screenshot showing assorted functional blocks attached to a painted light armour baseplate

A player mining basic resources, from an asteroid

First-person view of a player controlling a mining space ship, inside of its industrial cockpit

Space Engineers is 3D singleplayer and multiplayer sandbox game, which doesn't have a specific end goal. Instead, the players (Space Engineers - Astronauts) are encouraged to create their own goals, which they have to achieve, by utilising engineering, in space and/or planetery environments (including asteroids and moons). More specifically, the players use a combination strategically placed "blocks", game mechanics and system interactions, to gradually build up to their goal. For example, creating a space ship that can go to space. Although, for players that want a more specific end goal, the game includes some built-in npc interactions, but it also provides a collection of pre-included story driven scenarios to choose from, while also providing the ability to use custom instances created by other users, both based around the core game. Expanding on that, the game furthermore offers the ability of using custom player made scripts and/or mods, to enchance or build on the already existing in-game vanilla content, which are also sometimes used in custom made scenarios. Finally, it is worth mentioning that the players can also share their builds amongst them, through the use of blueprints, has two modes, survival and creative, and that the game has the unique characteristic, compared to other games in its genre, to be able to allow players to fully interact with their creations, without any major limitations.

=== First steps into the game ===
Players begin by selecting whether to play in single player mode, or to join a multiplayer server.

There are multiple multiplayer servers, all with different content and therefore different persistent worlds. These settings determine features such as the number and arrangement of asteroids, the inclusion of planets, and the starting equipment provided. During world creation, advanced options allow players to modify gameplay dynamics, such as tool and machine efficiency, inventory capacity, and whether procedural generation is enabled—effectively creating an infinite universe.

Once in-game, the player controls a customizable astronaut, known as a "Space Engineer," equipped with tools including a drill, welder, and grinder (if enabled). Gameplay revolves around the construction and management of voxel-based structures, starting with the placement of foundational blocks. Players can create grids by placing blocks freely in open space, which form the basis of ships, stations, or other constructs.

Each block has specific properties, serving structural, functional, aesthetic, or interactive roles. For example, armor blocks are the primary building material and can deform or be destroyed through collisions or weapon fire. Functional blocks, such as assemblers and refineries, require power, which can be generated by solar panels or reactors.

=== Structures and Grids ===
Players can create three types of structures:

- Small Grids: Used for small ships, rovers, and fine detailing, requiring fewer resources per block.
- Large Grids: Used for large ships, rovers and stations, enabling more robust and complex designs.
- Static Grids / Stations: Immovable structures anchored to a terrain voxels, which can be converted into ships if disconnected.

Grids are classified as small or large based on initial block size. The player cannot place small grid block onto large grid blocks and vice versa. A block intersecting terrain forms a station, and a stationary large grid ship can be converted to a station via the ship interface. Functional connections often use conveyors for resource and power transfer. Grids can connect through methods like connector blocks or landing gear.

All placeable objects can be colored before they are placed using a slider-based graphical user interface (GUI). Players can adjust the hue, saturation, and value of the color, allowing for a wide spectrum of options. There are 14 slots available to save new colors for future use within the same world.

=== Movement and Physics ===
Ships can be moved and rotated as long as they have power, a gyroscope, a thruster system, and a cockpit or remote control block. For effective movement and stabilization, thrusters must be placed in all six directions, and inertia dampeners can be enabled to assist in stopping motion automatically. Gyroscopes allow for rotational control, while additional thrusters enhance thrust and movement capabilities.

Astronauts can move freely in all environments using a jetpack, which allows for six degrees of motion: forward, backward, up, down, left, and right. In gravitational fields (natural or artificial), movement is restricted to a standard horizontal plane when the jetpack is disabled, mimicking standard terrestrial physics. "Mag-boots" enable players to walk on surfaces lacking gravity but will disengage upon jumping.

=== Resources and Environment ===
The environment includes editable voxel terrain like asteroids, planets, and moons, which can contain numerous resources. Players can mine these materials to craft components needed to make blocks and expand their grids. While asteroids lack gravity, planets and moons feature natural gravitational fields that affect players and ships. Artificial gravity can be generated on ships and asteroids using gravity generator blocks.

Asteroids and planets are made up of terrain voxels, which are significantly different from blocks. While players can destroy these terrain voxels, they cannot create them unless they are in creative mode. Celestial objects, such as planets and asteroids, are fixed in space and do not move. However, rock and mineral chunks that have been mined are affected by gravity and will react accordingly. Asteroids can take on various basic shapes, including spherical, toroidal, and rod-shaped forms, as well as other variations or combinations of these shapes.

Planets are somewhat resource-rich, though extraction of useful products from the surface can be difficult. Resources are spread out, and due to planetary gravity and the inefficiency of ion engines within the atmosphere, the player must build ground-based alternatives. Atmospheric flight is possible even on worlds with oxygen-deprived atmospheres. In order to leave a planet, the player will need to use hydrogen engines with sufficient fuel or build a hybrid spacecraft with atmospheric engines (for liftoff) and ion engines (upper atmosphere to space).

Planets in Space Engineers were released on November 12, 2015, after being in development since February 2015. There are several types of planets, themed after Earth, the Moon, Mars, Titan, Europa, and an "alien" planet. All of these feature multiple space stations that can be traded with for entire grids and materials or gases. The alien planets feature Sabiroids, hostile 6-legged, spider-like NPCs, and the Earth-like planet features wolves, hostile dog-like NPCs.

=== Creative mode ===
In creative mode, players are able to spawn unlimited resources, can instantly build tools and blocks, and are invincible. Some building tools, such as symmetry mode and copying and pasting of ships, are only available in this mode. Players are also able to build and manipulate asteroids or planets using a space tool known as "Voxel Hands." Although resources are available for collection and refinement, they are not required to create new ships or stations. Creative mode was initially the only mode available in the game. This mode eliminates the survival aspect of the game, allowing players to implement ideas quicker and easier. Grids that you build can also be, copied, pasted, or saved as blueprints.

=== Survival mode ===
In survival mode, players need to mine, collect, and refine various chemical elements from asteroids and planets in order to craft tools, weapons, and blocks as well as produce electricity. Resources can be mined manually using a hand drill, or by using ships with the necessary equipment. Components are produced by assembling them from raw materials; however, they can also be harvested by salvaging cargo ships. To avoid death, players must monitor their health, energy and oxygen levels. Damage can be inflicted on the player by collisions, weapons, contact with thrusters, meteor showers, or by running out of space suit energy. As the acceleration value of gravity generators stacks, damage from falling can be much more dangerous when multiple gravity generators are active. A player's health and energy can be restored using a Medical Room block, or a Survival Kit block. Energy can also be replenished by sitting in the cockpit of any powered structure.

=== Materials and items ===
In the survival mode of the game, all actions, including survival itself due to the power requirements of the space-suit's life-support system, depend on the gathering and refining of certain minerals. These minerals can be found on asteroids or planets, plundered from randomly spawned ships, or recovered from unknown signals. Raw materials are extracted from ore deposits on asteroids and then transported to a refinery, where they are processed into minerals for use in assemblers. The refined materials are formed into various components in the assembler which can then be used in the construction of ships or stations.

=== Single-Player and Multiplayer ===
Space Engineers supports both single-player and multiplayer gameplay. In single-player mode, players can explore and build independently within their world, focusing on creative construction or survival challenges by themselves. Despite the lack of other players, Space Engineers allows players to transfer grids over to different factions present within the game. This allows for solo plays to still partake in combat with AI controlled versions of their grids.

In multiplayer, players can connect with others through various options:

- Dedicated Servers: Players can join (or host) online servers, allowing for cross-platform play between PC, PlayStation and Xbox users. Dedicated servers offer persistent worlds with customized settings managed by a server hosts. A dedicated server can only be started from a PC and requires you to have a copy of the game installed to gain access to the dedicated server creation tools. Alternatively, you can hire a server from the official hiring website or join an official server hosted by Keen Software.
- Local Hosting: Players can host their own multiplayer sessions directly from their platform. These sessions are limited to players using the same platform (e.g., PC-only or Xbox-only) and are ideal for smaller, cooperative gameplay experiences between users. The maximum number of players who can join a local hosting world is dependent on the capabilities of the platform used. As a default, it is set to four, but can be extended to upwards of 32.

Multiplayer supports collaborative construction, resource sharing, and competitive gameplay, enabling large-scale projects or faction-based conflict. Server settings can be customized to include rules, mods, and gameplay scenarios.

=== Modding ===
Space Engineers features modding capabilities, allowing players to customize and enhance their gameplay experience. The game supports user-created modifications, including new blocks, tools, scripts, environments, and entirely new gameplay mechanics.

Mods can be accessed and shared through two platforms:

- Steam Workshop: For PC players, the Steam Workshop serves as the primary hub for browsing, downloading, and sharing mods. Players can subscribe to mods directly, which are then automatically downloaded and updated through Steam.
- Mod.io: For Console players and cross-platform compatibility, the Mod.io platform provides a similar functionality. Mods can be browsed and installed through an in-game interface, allowing console players to also have access to a range of user-generated content.

The modding community is said to by Keen to be highly active, creating content ranging from decorative blocks to performance optimizations and advanced scripting tools. Players can integrate mods into both single-player and multiplayer sessions, with dedicated servers often running mod lists to create distinguishable experiences. Players can also share their in game grid designs on these websites in the form of blueprints.

=== Unknown signals ===
On August 17, 2017, "unknown signals" were added to survival mode. These signals spawn randomly within a certain range of the player, and indicate the position of a small probe via a GPS coordinate and a repeating tone. Each probe contains components and can be disassembled, preventing the player from encountering dead end situations in which they do not have the components needed to produce the basic machines which are essential for constructing components and other machines, effectively preventing a catch-22.

Each probe also possesses a button, which when pressed has a chance to reward the player with a collectible skin, similar to a loot box. The skin can be for the player character's helmet, suit, boots, or tools, and can be traded or sold on the Steam Market. Each skin can be obtained for free in-game, with the exception of three sets: the Veteran Set, which was awarded to players who had owned the game before and played between August and September 2017; the Medieval Set, which is awarded to players who also own Medieval Engineers; and the Golden Set, which is awarded to players who purchase the Space Engineers Deluxe Edition.

== Development ==
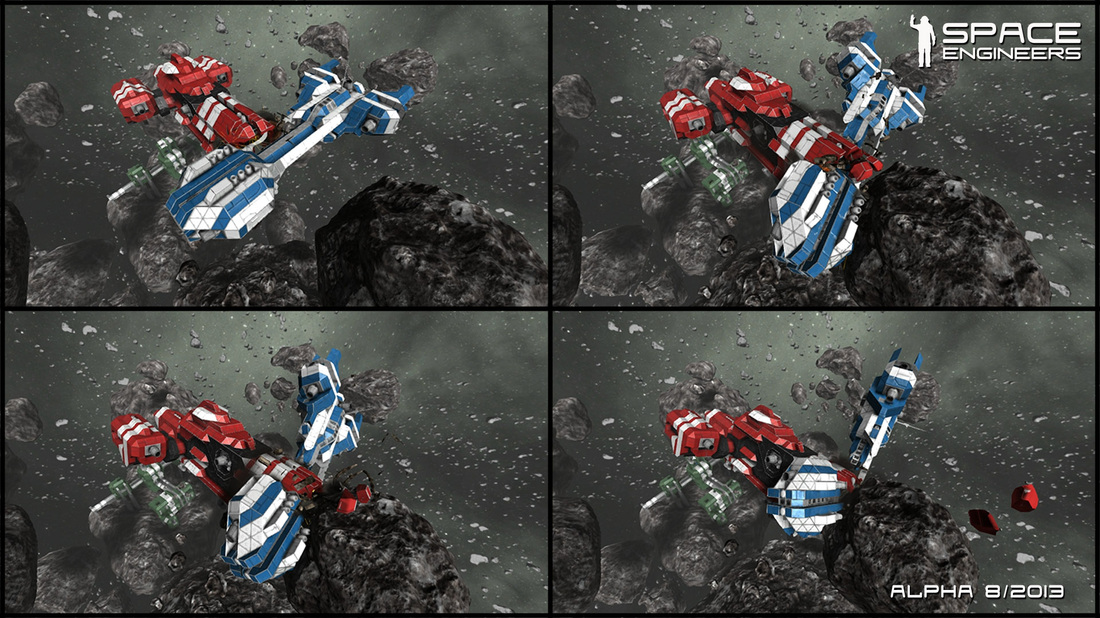
Demonstration of real-time collision between two spacecraft

Space Engineers was developed and published by the indie video game developer Keen Software House based in the Czech Republic. Implemented as a voxel-based sandbox game set in an asteroid field in space, built on their own game engine, VRAGE 2. Its core feature is volumetricity of the environment. Volumetric objects are structures composed from block-like modules interlocked in a grid and match the scale of the player character. Volumetric objects behave like real physical objects with mass, inertia and velocity. Individual modules have real volume and storage capacity and can be assembled, disassembled, deformed, and repaired or destroyed.

=== Pre-release ===
The pre-release alpha build was released on October 23, 2013, on Steam, featuring a single-player "creative" mode. On February 24, 2014, the company announced that Space Engineers had sold over 250,000 copies in four months. On March 24, 2014, Keen Software House announced that two key milestones in the development of Space Engineers have been achieved: survival mode and multiplayer. Content updates and bug fixes for the game are released weekly. On October 20, 2014, Keen Software House announced that the game had sold over 1,000,000 copies. On January 13, 2015, the studio announced their second engineering game, Medieval Engineers, a sandbox game about engineering, construction and the maintenance of architectural works and mechanical equipment using medieval technology.

On May 14, 2015, the source code was made freely available on GitHub to the public to allow easier modding. In February 2016 more parts of the game's source code were released. Updates to the public code repository were discontinued at the end of 2016.

=== Full-release ===
Space Engineers officially released out of early access on February 28, 2019, alongside The Survival Overhaul Update.

=== Console-Release ===
Space Engineers was only on Steam for five years and had only been fully released a year before it was confirmed to be coming to Xbox. The announcement was made and the game was set to be released on April 15th, 2020. Many people had asked for it to be brought to PlayStation, now that it was on Xbox, but the developers originally did not intend for it to be ported over. However with many fans asking, it made the developers start to consider it. After some time it was announced that the beta of the game was set to release to PlayStation 5 and PlayStation 4 on May 11th, 2023. On its release it was going to launch with cross-play enabled so that away all forms of gamers could enjoy the pursuit of engineering in space together.

=== Post-release updates and DLCs ===
Following the release, Keen has continued to release various updates to the game. In most, if not all cases, Keen has divided each update into a mechanical and an aesthetic component; the mechanical component being released for free while the aesthetic component (new block models, texture overlays, engineer suits, and emotes) have been released as a purchasable DLC. This may be a compromise between the need for a semi-predictable revenue stream for continued support of the game, and the need to avoid creating a "pay-to-win" situation.

Update title	Update Description	DLC Title	Date	DLC Description
		Decorative Pack #1	2019 April	New small and large cockpit blocks designed for better downward visibility than existing models. Additionally, the pack contained various interior furnishings for large ships, crawlers, and fixed installations.
		Style Pack	2019 June	Additional engineer suit models and emotes, as well as new block texture overlays.
Economy	Added NPC trading stations, NPC factions, a faction reputation system and faction icons.	Economy Deluxe	2019 August 22	Adds vending machine and ATM blocks, as well as additional suits, block texture overlays, Safe zone textures, and additional faction icons.
		Decorative Pack #2	2019 October	Adds Dispenser and jukebox blocks, a transparent LCD panel (useful for creating custom HUDs), various interior furnishings and window blocks, new catwalk blocks, railings, stairs and half stairs, a rotating warning light fixture, and a small collection of decorative metal crates.
Frostbite Pack	Added a new planet (Triton), and the Frostbite scenario.	Frostbite	2020 March 19	Adds the Frostbite Scenario, the Antenna Dish, decorative engineer cadavers (skeletons in suits, for atmosphere), a 7.5m wide by 5m tall airtight door block, an offset door, a blizzard-themed block texture overlay, a pair of "I'm Cold" and "Checking suit vitals display" emotes, and some LCD posters.
Sparks of the Future	Added Global Automatic Weather to planets.	Sparks of the Future Pack	2020 June 24	Includes a set of decorative neon tubes, sci-fi versions of various blocks such as the "Ion" and "Atmospheric" thrusters, LCD panels, Interior walls, button panels, sliding doors, and various button panels. Also includes a Sci-fi block texture overlay, two "Neon" block texture overlays, 8 new emotes, and a bar counter.
Wasteland	Added a new planet (Pertam), and the Scrap Race scenario	Wasteland Pack	2020 November 25	Adds a set of wheels with airless tyres, an exhaust pipe block, a buggy-style cockpit, two automotive-style lighting blocks, an assortment of "barred" window blocks, two view port blocks, three flavours of Storage Shelves (with crafting recipes that correspond to the items shown on the shelves), three block texture overlays ("Concrete", "Dust", "Rust 2", and "Retro future"), a "Scavenger" engineer suit model, and two new character emotes.
Warfare I	Added 3 pistols, 2 handheld rocket launchers, and the Uranium Heist scenario.	Field Engineer	2021 April 22	Adds the "Fire Cover" and "Half window" blocks, a weapon rack block, five new "passageway" blocks, an embrasure block, two new emotes, and the "Assault" suit.
Heavy Industry	Added magnetic plates and plate armor blocks.	Heavy Industry Pack	2021 July 28	Adds a Large (7.5m by 7.5m) Magnetic plate, a set of truss beam blocks and Industrial conveyor pipes, a decorative cylindrical column block, a vertical button panel, remodeled versions of the Large Hydrogen Tank; Large Cargo Container; Refinery; Assembler; and Hydrogen Thrusters. And a hazard pattern block texture overlay.
Warfare II	Added various turrets and block weapons, and a fire control computer for providing elevation and azimuth data to player-made turrets.	Broadside Pack	2022 February 4	A model and texture overhaul of the nuclear reactors; battery blocks; airtight hangar doors; rocket pod and gatling gun; and couch block. It also contains a "searchlight" block (a spotlight-camera-turret combo), a heat vent block, a set of bridge windows, a light panel, a "helm" station, a new helmet, a reinforced sliding door, and two new emotes.
Most Wanted	Free update that added New Armor shapes, conveyors, round windows and tons of other blocks requested by community		2022 April 28	-
Automatons	Added grid AI blocks and event controller that made automation of your ships and drones possible. Also Willis Ducts, 2x2 wheels, full block air vent, small connector and combat improvements.	Automatons Pack	2023 April 13	Emotion Controller, Saddle Cockpit, Compact Saddle Cockpit, Robot Helmet Skin, Plastic Armor Skin, Warning Signs, Top Mounted Camera, Angled Interior Walls, Inset Light Block, Pipework Blocks, Access Panels, Air Vent Fan, Automaton Programmable Block, Automaton Timer Block, Automaton Sensor.
Warfare Evolution	Added new PvP scenario Space Standoff, performance and AI improvements, Round Armor Panels, Short Wheel Suspensions, Flat Atmospheric Thrusters, Control Pedestals and AI Warning Signs.	Decorative Pack #3	2023 August 29	Warworn Armor Skin, Cab Cockpit, Twin-blade Wind Turbine, Colorable Solar Panels, Holo LCD, Inset LCD panel, Sloped LCD panel, Curved LCD panel, Round Beacon, Inset Couch, Inset Bed, Inset Button Panel, Entertainment Corner, Inset Bookshelf, Inset Aquarium, Inset Kitchen, Inset Cryo Room, Corner Medical Room, Half Bed, Half Bed Open, Scaffold Set, Crates & Barrels and Explosive Barrel.
Signal	Added Broadcast Controller, Action Relay, Additional Round Armor Panels, Compact Antenna, Scenario selection menu overhaul, New Red Ship Starting Scenario, Claiming NPC Grids, QoL improvements + PvE preparation	Signal Pack	2024 May 13	Truss Set, Corridor Blocks, Narrow Corridor & Stowage, Narrow Door, Inset Walls Set, Decorative Console Blocks, Bay Windows Set, Extra Live Orchestra Jukebox Tracks.
Contact	PvE Encounters (Planetary & Global), Faction Changes, The Factorum & Prototech endgame blocks, Toolbar Actions, Inset Connector, Ownership Changes, AI Improvements, more and upgraded Official Servers, QoL improvements	Contact Pack	2024 October 14	Gatling Turret Type II, Rocket Turret Type II, Small Gate Tall, Small Gate Wide, Modular Bridge Set, Captain's Desk, Square Piston, Flood Light Set, Parabolic Antenna, Kitchen set, First Aid Cabinet, Bunk, Modular Cargo Container, Media Player.
Fieldwork	Added Prototech Fusion Reactor, Small Oxygen Tank, Large Grid Small Connector, Refill Station, Complete Cargo Ships Overhaul, Complete Unknown Signals Overhaul, additional Set Value Actions and many QoL Improvements	Fieldwork Pack	2025 April 28	Lab Desks, Lab Experiments, Lab Vat, Lab Freezer, Lab Sliding Doors, Lab O2/H2 Generator, Lab Small H2 Tank, Lab Small O2 Tank, Lab H2 Tank, Round Passages, Pipes, Decorative Floors, Cargo Access Terminals, Exhaust Cap.
Apex Survival	Added Food System, Farming & Harvesting, Meaningful Death & New Buff System, Reorganized World Settings, New Consumables, New Environmental Hazards (Radiation, Weather, Meteor overhaul), 30 New Random Encounters	Apex Survival Pack	2025 September 8	Welder Type II, Grinder Type II, Drill Type II, Half Oxygen Farm, Half Algae Farm, Inset Terrarium Desert, Inset Terrarium Forest, Inset Planter, Survival Kit Type II, Ore Detector Type II, Storage Bin Set, Conduit Set, Warning Signs

== Reception ==
Reception

Aggregate score
Aggregator	Score
Metacritic	(XONE) 68/100

Space Engineers won the "4th best Indie Game of 2013" award from IndieDB, an honorable mention in the "Indie of the Year 2014" and first place in "Indie of the Year 2015".
