= Granny Smith (video game) =

2012 platform video game

- App icon
- Developer: Mediocre
- Publisher: Mediocre
- Designer: Henrik Johansson
- Programmer: Dennis Gustafsson
- Composer: Douglas Holmquist
- Platforms: Android; iOS
- Release: August 30, 2012
- Genre: Platformer
- Mode: Single-player

Granny Smith is a 2012 platform video game developed and published by Swedish indie game studio Mediocre.

== Release ==
Granny Smith was released for Android and iOS on August 30, 2012.

== Reception ==
Reception

Aggregate score
Aggregator	Score
Metacritic	80/100

Review scores
Publication	Score
Gamezebo	3.5/5
Pocket Gamer	4/5
TouchArcade	3.5/5
148Apps	4.5/5
AppSpy	4/5
CNET	8.5/10

On the review aggregator website Metacritic, Granny Smith has received 'generally favorable' reviews with a score of 80/100, based on 9 critics.

Multiple critic reviewers gave positive reviews.
