= Linux Game Publishing =

English game development company

Linux Game Publishing, Ltd.
- Type: Limited company
- Industry: Video games
- Founded: 5 September 2001
- Defunct: 3 May 2011
- Headquarters: Nottingham, UK
- Key people: Clive Crous, CEO (2012 - Present); Michael Simms, Founder and LGP Business Adviser (CEO: 2001 - 2012); Frank C. Earl, Senior Developer
- Website: www.linuxgamepublishing.com

Linux Game Publishing (sometimes also referred to as LGP) was a software company based in Nottingham in England. It ported, published and sold video games running on Linux operating systems. As well as porting games, LGP also sponsored the development of Grapple, a free software network library for games. As well as acting as a Linux game porter in of themselves, they also functioned as a publisher for other Linux game developers and porters. The company was dissolved on 3 May 2011.

== History ==
=== 2001-2012 ===
Creatures: Internet Edition was the first game published by LGP.

The company was founded on 5 September 2001 by Michael Simms when the similarly oriented Loki Software filed for bankruptcy. Simms had previously founded the Tux Games retailer a few years earlier, and the collapse of Loki would have gravely affected his available stock. Linux Game Publishing had initially tried to pick up the support rights to many of Loki's titles, but in the end it was only able to acquire the rights to MindRover: The Europa Project. It was able, however, to independently pick up the publishing rights to Creatures: Internet Edition as well as the rights to the port of Majesty: Gold Edition which was previously being developed by Tribsoft. Empowered by the addition of former Loki employee Mike Phillips, LGP released its first title on 21 December 2001. In 2002 Ryan C. Gordon (a.k.a. icculus, former Loki Software) started porting the puzzle game Candy Cruncher to Linux and he was looking for beta testers. The first Linux version of Candy Cruncher was released in 2002 by Pyrogon (an indie game company founded by former employee of 3dfx and id Software Brian Hook) as a digital download. LGP took interest in publishing Pyrogon games on physical CDs, and on 10 September 2002, LGP and Pyrogon announced a publishing partnership for Pyrogon's Linux titles. Upon learning about the release of Postal 2 in 2003, Ryan decided to contact the developer behind it wondering if they would be interested in him making a port of the game to Linux. Loki had previously ported the original Postal to Linux, and he was interested in keeping the franchise compatible. Running with Scissors agreed, and the finished port was shipped on 14 February 2005, with LGP initially handling the publishing of the Linux version. In 2003, Hyperion Entertainment and Metropolis Software extended their existing license agreement for Gorky 17. Linux gaming developers Steven Fuller and Joe Tennies joined the Hyperion Entertainment game development team and they ported Gorky 17 to Linux, which three years later was published by LGP.

Shadowgrounds Survivor is the latest game published by LGP.

David Hedbor, founder and main programmer of Eon Games—an independent game development company specializing in creating games for desktop computers and handheld devices, ported NingPo MahJong and Hyperspace Delivery Boy! to Linux, which later were published by LGP. (the first version of NingPo Mah Jong for Linux, however, was released in 2003 by Pyrogon only as a digital download). Eon Games stopped development and porting of games for Linux and other platforms in 2005 (and later closed in 2010). In 2003, LGP began working with Epic Interactive, a German company specializing in porting and publishing games to alternative platforms. Epic Interactive ported Knights and Merchants: The Shattered Kingdom and Software Tycoon to Linux. In 2005 Epic Interactive has changed its name to Runesoft Entertainment. In 2005 Czech development studio Mindware Studios released the Linux demo of Cold War. Cold War was the first LGP game published on a DVD disc. LGP gained the publishing rights to several other game titles including Soul Ride, as well as Disciples II: Dark Prophecy. The latter has been described by Michael Simms as "LGP's DNF" and "the game that refused to be ported" and has been said to have been the cause of several resignations from the company, including that of aforementioned employee Mike Phillips. It has still, alongside another long delayed game Bandits: Phoenix Rising, yet to be released.

In 2005, LGP announced the opening of their beta test for Linux version of X2: The Threat.

On 13 March 2008 Finnish game company Frozenbyte announced a partnership with Linux specialist IGIOS Ltd to port and release Shadowgrounds and Shadowgrounds Survivor on the Linux platform. Both ports were later published by LGP, and LGP was actively involved in developing the Shadowgrounds Survivor port alongside IGIOS.

In December 2008, LGP released X3: Reunion and X3: Reunion Special Edition, which were first games using copy protection and the new installer written to use the GTK2 toolkit and support for using XDG menus.

In December 2008, LGP launched PenguinPlay, a new website for Linux gamers, allowing matchmaking for multiplayer games, and social networking.

In June 2009 they began offering downloadable games and game rentals.

In August 2009 they grudgingly dropped support for all PowerPC games, stating that "demand for PPC versions of LGP games has been almost non existent".

On 10 August 2009 Michael Simms confirmed that LGP is working on an original simple game based on Sudoku.

In September 2009 Shadowgrounds (the first LGP game available in Finnish) and Shadowgrounds Survivor were finally released, the latter becoming the first commercial game for Linux using the Nvidia PhysX middleware. In late December 2010 the IGIOS Linux team founded a new Finnish company named Alternative Games, which is focused upon porting games to Linux as well as to Mac OS X. Later they will also port the Linux version of Trine for Frozenbyte without Linux Game Publishing.

In late September 2010 the Linux Game Publishing server suffered a massive hard drive failure which took down all of their online infrastructure, including related websites such as Tux Games and The Linux Game Tome. Various other unforeseen issues caused the recovery not to take place until late November, with partial service being restored on 23 November 2010, with full recovery not being made until 8 December 2010. They have since stated that work is going well on their current project, and that they have a working build of it in internal alpha testing.

=== 2012–2020 ===
On 31 January 2012, after over a decade with the company, Michael Simms announced in a blog post, that he was stepping down as CEO, saying "you can't continue on a high energy rampage for 10 years without something breaking", and handing over control to Clive Crous, citing his "unrestrained enthusiasm for Linux gaming" as his primary qualification. Since August 2012, LGP has started selling their games in stores like Desura, Gameolith and Ubuntu Software Center (USC). However, early information about LGP games in USC had shown up on the Canonical blog two years before. In 2012, they shut down the PenguinPlay website. In 2015, LGP decided to host their website on the Heroku cloud service and they closed their support system hosted on Tender. In 2013, LGP removed several of their resellers from their list e.g. Fun4tux, Ixsoft, Linuxpusher etc. In 2014 - 2015 LGP's resellers stopped offering rentals or eight specific games for download which used LGP copy protection. The website was brought back for archival purposes in 2020.

== Games published ==
=== Supported ===
Title	Genre	Date of Release	Available Languages	Developer	Porter	Publisher
Creatures: Internet Edition	Simulation	21 December 2001	Dutch, English, French, German, Italian, Spanish	Creature Labs	Creature Labs	Linux Game Publishing
MindRover: The Europa Project	Strategy	13 December 2002	English	CogniToy	Loki Software/Linux Game Publishing	Linux Game Publishing
Candy Cruncher	Puzzle	6 February 2003	English	Pyrogon	Ryan C. Gordon	Linux Game Publishing
Majesty: Gold Edition	Real-time strategy	15 April 2003	English	Cyberlore Studios	Tribsoft/Linux Game Publishing	Linux Game Publishing
NingPo MahJong	Puzzle	21 January 2004	English	Pyrogon	Eon Games	Linux Game Publishing
Hyperspace Delivery Boy!	Puzzle/Action	10 May 2004	English	Monkeystone Games	Eon Games	Linux Game Publishing
Software Tycoon	Simulation	10 January 2005	English, German	destraX Entertainment Software GbR	RuneSoft	Linux Game Publishing
Postal²: Share The Pain	First-person shooter	4 February 2005	English	Running with Scissors	Ryan C. Gordon	Linux Game Publishing
Soul Ride	Sports	24 June 2005	English	Slingshot	Linux Game Publishing	Linux Game Publishing
Gorky 17	Tactical RPG	15 June 2006	English, German, Spanish, French (Text Only)	Metropolis Software	Hyperion Entertainment	Linux Game Publishing
Cold War	Stealth	4 August 2006	English, German, French, Russian, Spanish (text only), Italian (text only), Polish (text only), Czech (text only)	Mindware Studios	Mindware Studios	Linux Game Publishing
Knights and Merchants: The Shattered Kingdom	Real-time strategy	13 March 2007	English, German, Spanish, French	Joymania Entertainment	RuneSoft/Linux Game Publishing	Linux Game Publishing
Ballistics	Racing	7 June 2007	English	Grin	Linux Game Publishing	Linux Game Publishing
Jets'n'Guns	Shoot 'em up	29 January 2009	English	RakeInGrass	RakeInGrass/Linux Game Publishing	Linux Game Publishing
Sacred: Gold Edition	Action role-playing	9 April 2009	English	Ascaron Entertainment	Linux Game Publishing	Linux Game Publishing
Shadowgrounds	Shooter	16 September 2009	English, Finnish	Frozenbyte	IGIOS/Linux Game Publishing	Linux Game Publishing
Shadowgrounds Survivor	Shooter	18 September 2009	English, Finnish	Frozenbyte	IGIOS/Linux Game Publishing	Linux Game Publishing

=== Unsupported ===
Title	Genre	Date of Release	Available Languages	Developer	Porter	Publisher
X2: The Threat	Space simulation	30 May 2006	English, German, French, Italian	Egosoft	Linux Game Publishing	Linux Game Publishing
X3: Reunion	Space simulation	5 December 2008	English, German, French, Italian (text only)	Egosoft	Linux Game Publishing	Linux Game Publishing
X3: Reunion - Special Edition	Space simulation	5 December 2008	English, German, French, Italian (text only)	Egosoft	Linux Game Publishing	Linux Game Publishing

=== Upcoming ===
Title	Genre	Date of Release	Available Languages	Developer	Porter	Publisher
Unknown Title (Original LGP game)	Puzzle	in development since 2009	?	Linux Game Publishing	Linux Game Publishing	Linux Game Publishing
Bandits: Phoenix Rising	Racing	in development since 2003	English	Grin	Linux Game Publishing	Linux Game Publishing
Disciples II: Dark Prophecy	Turn-based strategy	in development since 2002	English	Strategy First	Linux Game Publishing	Linux Game Publishing

== Technology ==
=== Grapple ===
Grapple was a free software package created in 2006 by Michael Simms for adding multiplayer support to computer games and applications. It used Internet protocols, supporting both TCP/IP and UDP/IP. It was intended to be simple enough that multiplayer features can be added to a game "as little as a dozen lines of code".

Grapple took care of creating, monitoring and closing connections to a server, and allowed support for multiple servers. It was message-oriented, where clients and servers each maintained a message queue, but also permitted relaying messages from client to client. There was also support for a game lobby system. The package was released under the GNU LGPL.

==== Games using Grapple ====
- Ballistics (Linux Version) by Linux Game Publishing
- Candy Cruncher (Linux Version) by Linux Game Publishing
- Jets'n'Guns (Linux Version) by Linux Game Publishing
- Knights and Merchants: The Shattered Kingdom (Linux Version) by Linux Game Publishing
- Majesty: Gold Edition (Linux Version) by Linux Game Publishing
- Sacred: Gold (Linux Version) by Linux Game Publishing

==== Applications using Grapple ====
- PenguinPlay, Multiplayer matchmaker for games.

=== Copy protection ===
Linux Game Publishing employs a simple form of digital rights management similar to that employed by Games for Windows – Live. Upon the first run of the game, the user is prompted for a license key, alongside their LGP user name and password.

Some features include:

- LGP copy protection does not require internet connection to install or play the game.
- This system does not require user to keep the disc inside the CD drive while playing games.

This system enables users to install the game on multiple systems (as there is not a limited number of activations), while also discouraging sharing by noting that any user who has access to the owner's LGP account credentials could potentially lock the owner out of their own game.

==== Games published ====
Currently, LGP has published nine games that contain their DRM technology:

DRM by title
Title	Box version	Digital version
Ballistics	No	None
Ballistics (r2)	None	Yes
Jets'n'Guns	Yes	Yes
Majesty Gold	No	None
Majesty Gold (r2)	Yes	Yes
Sacred: Gold Edition	Yes	Yes
Shadowgrounds	Yes	Yes
Shadowgrounds Survivor	Yes	Yes
X2: The Threat	No	None
X2: The Threat (r2)	None	Yes
X3: Reunion	Yes	Yes
X3: Reunion - Special Edition	Yes	None

Owners of a game license can transfer the license to someone else, download a replacement disc image and allow people to see that the license is valid if they buy your game. Owners can retrieve lost keys and forgotten passwords. Buyers can check to see if they are buying a game with a valid license.

=== Open source projects ===
Besides Grapple, above, LGP released and contributed to several open-source projects. They created several patches for OpenPlay, that fix broken Linux support, bring some functionalities that are present in DirectPlay. They worked on other open source projects such as SDL or OpenAL. LGP worked on GPL'd the Soul Ride engine at SourceForge. Michael Simms also claimed that LGP avoids publishing games similar to popular open source video games.

== Canceled projects ==
LGP canceled Angry-Pixel project, which was sponsor the creation of a new company for the development of games for Linux.

The game Tzar: The Burden of the Crown was considered by Linux Game Publishing to be ported to Linux, but it was rejected due to concerns within the company about its gameplay and after hearing negative comments about the game from the Linux gaming community.

On 6 February 2003 LGP released Candy Cruncher to Linux running on computers with Sparc processors, but two years later they removed this information from their website without explanation.

On 24 June 2005 LGP released Soul Ride to Linux running on computers with Alpha and Sparc processors.

On 30 August 2005 Linux Game Publishing cancelled a contract to publish the Linux version of Northland which is the third game in the Cultures real-time strategy series, because technical issues with the game that Runesoft, who were doing the development work on the port, could not resolve to their satisfaction. However, on 25 January 2006 Runesoft released Northland for Linux, but the multiplayer mode is still not supported.

LGP grudgingly dropped support for five PowerPC games:

- Candy Cruncher
- Gorky 17
- Majesty Gold
- NingPo MahJong
- Soul Ride

Title	Platforms		
Title	PowerPC	SPARC	Alpha
Candy Cruncher	Yes	Yes	No
Gorky 17	Yes	No	No
Majesty: Gold Edition	Yes	No	No
NingPo MahJong	Yes	No	No
Soul Ride	Yes	Yes	Yes

PenguinPlay was a website for Linux gamers, allowing matchmaking for multiplayer games, and social networking. LGP added PenguinPlay lobby for six games:

- Ballistics
- Candy Cruncher
- Jets'n'Guns
- Knights and Merchants: The Shattered Kingdom
- Majesty Gold
- Sacred: Gold Edition

In October 2012 they informed their customers that the license agreement with Egosoft for X2 and X3 (including Special Edition) had expired and were no longer able to offer these titles to new customers.

== Unreleased projects ==
A Linux client of World of Warcraft was developed, and negotiations with Linux Game Publishing were under way until Blizzard Entertainment cancelled the project without warning or explanation, even though it was functionally complete and ready to go.

Since 2004 Frank C. Earl (also known as svartalf) worked on PowerPC and Athlon64 versions of Ballistics and Soul Ride, but these versions of the games were never released. However, he prepared demo version of Soul Ride for Linux x86_64 for GDC 2003, but this demo is not publicly available. Svartalf was also the lead developer of Disciples II: Dark Prophecy and he worked on PowerPC and x86-64 versions of Disciples II, but work on the game still ended and LGP stopped working on games for PowerPC. However, LGP is still working on IA-32 version of Disciples II.

LGP still did not release the demo version of Sacred: Gold and patch 1.08 for Linux version of MindRover: The Europa Project.

== Tux Games ==
Tux Games was one of the earliest online Linux game retailers, founded on 1 January 2000 by Michael Simms, who would later also found Linux Game Publishing. It was originally created in response to Simms being unable to order a version of Loki Software's port of Civilization: Call to Power from any British reseller.

Tux Games, being one of the older sellers, was part of the few places selling Loki Software stock. It also offered the unique service of selling Linux boxed copies of many games whose ports otherwise require the presence of a Windows boxed version, such as with several id Software products. Doing this made sure that it would count as a Linux sale.

In addition to its services as a games seller, Tux Games has attempted to branch out into other areas, such as selling gaming oriented computer systems, and attempting to open a Donation Center for free software projects. In the end, neither of these were successful, but hosting of old Loki Software demos was met with praise.

Tux Games received many requests for sales statistics, which prompted Simms to add a sales information chart to the main website. The overall top five overall sellers were Sid Meier's Alpha Centauri, Tribes 2, Return to Castle Wolfenstein, Neverwinter Nights, and Majesty Gold.

Towards the end of its run, Tux Games gained some competition from other similarly focused retailers, such as Fun4Tux, Wupra, ixsoft and LinuxPusher. All retailers based in continental Europe, most also served as re-sellers for LGP. It was also competing with the online digital distribution services Gameolith and Desura. It was also occasionally criticized for poor order handling.

On 31 January 2012 after over a decade with the company, Michael Simms announced he was stepping down as CEO and handing over control to Clive Crous. The store went down in 2014.

== See also ==
- Hyperion Entertainment
- Loki Software
- Ryan C. Gordon
- Steam Powered
