= Trine 5: A Clockwork Conspiracy =

- Developer: Frozenbyte
- Publisher: THQ Nordic
- Director: Maija Koivula
- Producer: Antti Rantanen
- Designer: Kim Juntunen
- Programmer: Teemu Lindborg
- Artists: Charlotta Tiuri; Mio Mäkijärvi
- Writers: Maija Koivula; Silja Partanen; Petra Koponen
- Composer: Ari Pulkkinen
- Engine: Storm3D
- Platforms: Microsoft Windows; Nintendo Switch; PlayStation 4; PlayStation 5; Xbox One; Xbox Series X/S
- Release: August 31, 2023
- Genres: Platform, puzzle
- Modes: Single-player, multiplayer

Trine 5: A Clockwork Conspiracy is a platform-puzzle video game developed by Frozenbyte and published by THQ Nordic. It is the fifth installment in the Trine series, following Trine 4: The Nightmare Prince. The game was released on August 31, 2023, for Microsoft Windows, Nintendo Switch, PlayStation 4, PlayStation 5, Xbox One, and Xbox Series X and Series S.

== Gameplay ==
Like Trine 4: The Nightmare Prince, its predecessor, A Clockwork Conspiracy is a 2.5D side-scrolling video game. The game features 20 levels and three playable characters: Amadeus the Wizard, Zoya the Thief, and Pontius the Knight. The game introduces new abilities for the returning characters: Amadeus can now reverse gravity, Zoya has access to ricochet arrows, and Pontius can use a throwing sword, creating new anchor points for traversal. As players progress in the game and complete quests, they will collect experience, allowing them to unlock more abilities for each character. According to the developer, combat in Trine 5 is more challenging than Trine 4, with the game introducing multi-phase boss fights. As with previous games in the series, the game has a large focus on physics puzzles. New elements, including air, light, magnets, and electricity, are introduced in Trine 5.

The game's campaign supports both local and online multiplayer. There is also a four-player cooperative multiplayer mode, allowing players to utilize different combinations of characters. Difficulty of the game's puzzle, combat and resurrection can be adjusted separately.

== Story ==
The kingdom is thriving, defended by Amadeus, Pontius and Zoya, whose powers of Trine allows them to swap places and cheat death. However, Lady Sunny and inventor Lord Goderic plot a coup. They convince the Great Council to replace the kingdom's knights with Goderic's clockwork automata, then incapacitate the Astral Academy's wizards with a machine that steals minds and magic. Sunny tricks the heroes to extract their magic of Trine, but the attempt fails, leading Sunny to use a bomb that destroys the Academy and blaming the trio.

The three rush to the Great Council to warn them of Sunny, but finds them missing. Goderic, pretending to be an ally, tricks them into triggering another bomb that disintegrates all buildings in the city but leaves people unharmed. Sunny accuses the heroes, while also implying she has kidnapped Amadeus's three children. They surrender and are thrown in the dungeons, while Sunny declares herself queen.

The heroes escape with the help of librarian Nenet, who Zoya met during an earlier heist. Amadeus realizes the Astral Observatory, an outpost of the Astral Academy, might still have wizards able to help them. There, they learn that Goderic has been stealing magic from wizards (including the students seen in Nine Parchments and Trine 4) to power his own automata. After assisting the Observatory wizards, one of them, seeress Barbara, divines that Amadeus's children are being taken to Goderic's factory on a floating archipelago by airship. Sunny and Goderic plan to extract the children's minds and powers, but at the last moment, the heroes use the power of Trine to swap places with the triplets. Cornered, the villains attempt to escape, but seemingly fall to their deaths.

With Sunny and Goderic defeated, the wizards are restored, the kingdom begins rebuilding, Amadeus reunites with his children, Zoya goes on an expedition with Nenet, and Pontius wonders about the future.

== Development ==
Series developer Frozenbyte and publisher THQ Nordic officially announced the game in April 2023. According to the team, combat in the game is "organic", and more similar to Trine 2 than Trine 4: The Nightmare Prince. The game was released on August 31, 2023, for Windows PC, Nintendo Switch, PlayStation 4, PlayStation 5, Xbox One, and Xbox Series X and Series S.

== Reception ==
According to review aggregator website Metacritic, the game received "generally positive reviews" upon release.
