= Shadowgrounds =

2005 video game

- Developer: Frozenbyte
- Publishers: FL: Plan 1; WW: Meridian4; Linux Game Publishing (Linux)
- Director: Lauri Hyvärinen
- Producer: Jeff Giasson
- Designer: Timo Maaranen
- Writers: Joel Kinnunen; Ari Pulkkinen; Ilkka Kuusela
- Composer: Ari Pulkkinen
- Engine: Storm3D
- Platforms: Windows, Linux, Mac OS X
- Release: Windows: EU: November 17, 2005; AU: March 2006; NA: April 25, 2006; UK: May 5, 2006; Linux; September 16, 2009; Mac OS X April 13, 2011
- Genre: Top-down shooter
- Modes: Single-player, multiplayer

Shadowgrounds is a top-down shooter for Windows, Linux and Mac OS X, developed by Frozenbyte. The game takes place on a space colony on Ganymede which is being attacked by aliens. It was released for Windows on November 17, 2005, in stores in Finland and Germany, and in 2006 in the rest of Europe and North America.

As well as being available through retail stores, the game began being distributed on Valve's Steam on May 8, 2006. The game was also available on Gametap as of January 31, 2008 until its close, and is on Good Old Games as of March 3, 2011. The game was later ported by IGIOS and published to Linux by Linux Game Publishing, with the Linux version being released on September 16, 2009. It was made available on Desura on April 10, 2011.

A sequel, Shadowgrounds: Survivor, was released in 2007 and focuses on three separate characters trying to survive the alien onslaught shown in the first game. Both games were later released together along with two other Frozenbyte titles, Trine and Splot, to form the third Humble Indie Bundle. The Humble Frozenbyte Bundle games were also offered as incentives in the later Humble Frozen Synapse Bundle.

== Gameplay ==
The game is a fast-paced top-down shooter reminiscent of the Alien Breed series. Like the earlier Finnish game Death Rally, Shadowgrounds presents a familiar concept with modern resources. The plot of a monster attack on a space colony exists primarily as a justification for the action; monsters are plentiful and weapons large.

Shadowgrounds uses light and darkness as vital components of gameplay and atmosphere, hence the name. The game is largely dark, and the hero carries a motion scanner and a flashlight with a regenerating but limited power supply (a common gaming trope). There are ten weapons, all with three possible upgrades. Medpacks, weapons and ammunition are found in stores and near dead soldiers.

Players explore indoor and outdoor facilities in order to complete a usually linear series of tasks (usually of the "FedEx" or "get to Point B" varieties, though other tasks include disarming force fields, enabling a radio transmitter, or fixing various broken machinery), while clearing the area of a chain of progressively more powerful creatures. Occasionally, other NPCs fight alongside the player, but, especially in the case of characters central to the plot, they are invulnerable and can be left to kill while the player recharges his flashlight or hunts for items.

In order to enable upgrades the weapons, players collect upgrade pieces from killing monsters. Players can also pick up weapons and ammunition and health packs and destroy a large number of crates (another cliché of the genre). Finally, there are PDAs and computer terminals scattered through the maps that serve to loosely advance the plot with some optional exposition.

There are a number of vehicles shown both in cutscenes and on the various maps, including an alien ship and an earth mover; however, none of these are player-drivable, and the game will switch to a non-interactive cutscene if a task involves a vehicle.

=== Cooperative mode ===
Cooperative gameplay, which was added late in development as a bonus for fans, is available within the single-player story. Cooperatively, one player controls Tyler via the keyboard and mouse, and one to three more can play as unnamed characters, using gamepads attached to the same computer. There is no Internet or LAN support.

There are a few other gameplay differences between the single-player and cooperative modes. The respawns that are available in single player mode are still a facet of the game; however, each time any player of the team dies, all players are respawned at a safe location, and one respawn from the respawn pool is used. Similarly, weapons collected are made available to all players, and upgrade parts are shared (ammunition, however, is not distributed).

== Plot ==
Players take the role of Wesley Tyler, a senior mechanic on the IGTO Repair Base on Ganymede, who is tasked with the repair of various systems. At the start of the game, Tyler is ordered to repair the backup generators, and he and two other technicians drive out to fix them. On the way there, they discuss Tyler's past, how he was previously in charge of a security team, before being blamed for an accident involving faulty equipment. Upon fixing the power however, Tyler loses radio contact with the others, and starts encountering small three-legged insect like creatures. He then starts finding bodies, and larger more dangerous versions of the aliens he had encountered before. He finds a pistol and begins to battle the increasingly hostile aliens.

He eventually receives a message from a Corporal Jane Awryn, who is trapped in a water treatment facility. Tyler proceeds to rescue her and the two of them attempt to battle their way to the main colony of New Atlantis. On the way, they are ordered to report to "Weather Station 5", an illegal military compound and one of the first of the IGTO's secret military and research projects that Tyler will encounter throughout the game. Tyler is tasked by Lieutenant Dan Baxter with various different missions, before being reunited with Jane and sent to restore the ISERCom facility so that a message can be sent to any nearby space ships. The Provectus, a large carrier class ship, hears the message and proceeds on route to help.

Meanwhile, Jane and Tyler are ordered to report to New Atlantis in order to protect the civilians living there. Despite some sizeable resistance, the colony had already mostly been trashed, and Tyler encounters few survivors. He and Jane do manage to rescue Dr. Harold Weiss, an IGTO research scientist, who informs them of the unfortunate news that the Provectus had already been shot down. Tyler and the rest search the stricken ship and eventually find and rescue Colonel Roger Smith, who despite the crash is still defiant and confident that they can take down the alien's mothership. Tyler is sent to go to the mines and find Baxter and his team to provide additional reinforcements, but arrives too late and only finds Baxter shortly before he dies.

Now on their own, Tyler reunites with Jane, Weiss, and Smith and they attempt to launch a series of defensive missiles. The missiles fail to launch, being engulfed on the launch pad. Ever undaunted, Smith devises another plan; they will take the alien pod, one of the many alien technologies that was being researched in secret by the IGTO, and the also alien AMEW bomb and blow up the ship from the inside. With Smith staying behind to man the launch, Tyler, Jane, and Weiss are flown into the heart of the mothership. Upon reaching the centre of the ship and defeating a final boss, the last of the Ancient ones, they are approached by the aliens' collective consciousness who inform them of the real reasons for the invasion and the danger they are posing to themselves and the whole Solar System.

The AMEW bomb was based on technologies that they had developed many years before, utilizing an energy source so powerful that it could destroy stars. The aliens had abused it themselves, destroying their home planet and most of their own race. Those that remained were intent that no one else should share the same fate. They had tried to recover all of the energy they had spread throughout the universe, but were disturbed to find out humanity's attempts to utilize it much as they did. They tried to warn them, but those in charge refused to listen, so they sent an army of genetically engineered warriors to protect humanity from itself. The bomb that they hold in their hands could take out every planet and moon orbiting the Sun. Weiss deactivates the bomb, and the aliens promise to never again meddle in our affairs, and return Jane, Tyler, and Weiss back to safety.

== Modifications ==
Frozenbyte has released extensive documentation on how to make modifications on the Shadowgrounds engine, as well as how to make custom maps and scenarios. While the first version of the official Level Editor, released on June 29, 2006, was only for retail versions of the game, users who purchased the game via Steam received access to the editor on July 13, 2006. With that release, all of the filesystem for the Editor was moved onto the Steam platform.

After the game was included as part of the third Humble Indie Bundle, the Shadowgrounds and Shadowgrounds: Survivor source code (but not their graphics or level editor) was publicly released. The source-code license prohibits commercial use and permits Frozenbyte to change the license terms at will.

== Reception ==
Reception

Aggregate score
Aggregator	Score
Metacritic	74/100

Review scores
Publication	Score
4Players	80%
Computer Games Magazine	3.5/5
Eurogamer	6/10
Gamekult	5/10
GameSpot	6.9/10
GameZone	7.5/10
IGN	7.5/10
Jeuxvideo.com	12/20
PC Gamer (US)	81%
X-Play	3/5

Shadowgrounds received "mixed or average reviews" according to the review aggregation website Metacritic.

== See also ==
- Shadowgrounds: Survivor
