= Trine 4: The Nightmare Prince =

2019 video game

- Developer: Frozenbyte
- Publisher: Modus Games
- Director: Lauri Hyvärinen
- Producer: Antti Rantanen
- Programmer: Eetu Röpelinen
- Artist: Charlotta Tiuri
- Writer: Maija Koivula
- Composer: Ari Pulkkinen
- Platforms: Microsoft Windows; Xbox One; PlayStation 4 Nintendo Switch; Stadia
- Release: Windows, Switch, PlayStation 4, Xbox One; October 8, 2019; Stadia; March 30, 2021
- Genres: Puzzle-platform, action-adventure
- Modes: Single-player, multiplayer

Trine 4: The Nightmare Prince is a 2019 video game developed by Frozenbyte and published by Modus Games for Microsoft Windows, Nintendo Switch, PlayStation 4, and Xbox One in October 2019 and released for Stadia in March 2021. It is the fourth installment of Trine series, following Trine 3: The Artifacts of Power, and features a return of the series' three protagonists and medieval fantasy location.

A successor, Trine 5: A Clockwork Conspiracy, was released in 2023.

== Gameplay ==
Trine 4 refines the gameplay of the previous installments. It is a 2.5D platformer with a focus on physics puzzles. The abilities available to the player for solving puzzles include conjuring boxes, attaching ropes to objects, and telekinesis.

The player character in the game is, story-wise, three characters in one. The player can transform into one of these three characters at a time: Amadeus the wizard, Zoya the thief, and Pontius the knight. Amadeus can conjure boxes, spheres, and planks, and he can telekinetically move some objects. Zoya can affix ropes to objects either to swing from them, immobilize them, or create rope bridges. She is also armed with a bow. Pontius has a shield with which he can deflect certain projectiles at other targets, and jump-stomp. Pontius is also armed with a sword.

As with previous entries, the gameplay is a mix of physics puzzles and combat.

While Trine 3 experimented with 3D platforming Trine 4 returns to the strictly 2-dimensional movement of the first two Trine games.

In another return to form, Trine 4 adds character progression (which was missing from the third game). While certain core abilities (such as Zoya's "fairy rope") are unlocked at fixed points in the game, there are optional abilities that the player can purchase using tokens collected over the course of the game. These abilities give the player new options for solving puzzles, or new ways to fight monsters. If the player wishes, they can replay earlier levels with unlocked abilities to solve those earlier puzzles in new ways.

== Plot ==
Prince Selius (introduced in Nine Parchments) had aptitude for magic, but misused his father's spellbook, releasing the shadow of his soul and destroying his family's castle. His parents therefore sent him away to the Astral Academy, but the Academy wizards were unable to control the prince's nightmare magic and he eventually escapes. Amadeus the wizard, Pontius the knight and Zoya the thief are tasked by the Academy headmaster to bring Selius back. At first the trio tries to convince him to return, but Selius refuses, revealing that the Academy simply locked him in the dungeons. His unstable shadow magic causes his own nightmares, those of the heroes, and even the inhabitants of the wilderness to manifest physically, and Selius flees.

While tracking the prince, the trio helps the creatures of the wilderness in fighting their nightmares and in return three nature spirits give them a potion of light, which should help Selius—it does, but it also empowers Selius's shadow, since the brighter the light, the deeper the shadow it casts. The trio assists Selius in fighting his shadow; ultimately, the prince is able to use the power of light to seal his shadow back into his soul. His magic now stabilized, he agrees to return to the Astral Academy.

=== Melody of Mystery ===
Some time after returning Prince Selius to the Astral Academy, some of the students (all first seen in Nine Parchments) began rehearsing for an autumn play. One of them, Cornelius, stumbles upon a magic music box, accidentally releasing a spirit known as Melody, who traps the students in a magical dream where their wishes come true. Selius, unaffected thanks to his own dream magic, summons the heroes of Trine into the dream world, seeking their assistance. The heroes traverse the students' dreams, and learn that Melody is a genie-in-training who uses dreams as a way to grant wishes, not understanding that it is harmful for humans to sleep forever. The heroes successfully wake up all the students except Cornelius, who is so attached to his dream that he must be forced to awaken.

== Reception ==
Reception

Aggregate score
Aggregator	Score
Metacritic	NS: 80/100; PC: 81/100; PS4: 80/100; XONE: 80/100

Review scores
Publication	Score
Destructoid	7/10
Eurogamer	Recommend
GameRevolution	4/5
IGN	8.5/10
Jeuxvideo.com	15/20
Nintendo Life	8/10
PC Gamer (US)	7/10
Push Square	8/10
MondoXbox	8/10

The game has received positive reviews. The game was given "generally favorable" reviews according to Metacritic.

IGN gave the game an 8.5/10 saying, "Trine 4: The Nightmare Prince is a sequel that plays it very safe – which, in this particular case, is for the better. Coming back to the traditional style of co-op gameplay and puzzle solving that made the first two games so delightful is exactly the kind of refocusing that the Trine series needed after the misfire of Trine 3. Some lackluster puzzle designs, technical issues, and a lack of difficulty stand in the way of it overtaking Trine 2 as the best of the series, but Trine 4 still remains a shining example of how cooperative gaming should be, and is one of the most gorgeous looking 2.5D games of 2019."

Eurogamer stated that the game was "Outrageously pretty and newly refined, Frozenbyte's series finally strikes gold."

Destructoid also reviewed the game, saying, "It's an easy recommendation for platform fans, but it's also just a plain fun time. It's not revolutionary or trailblazing, but it does what it needs to prove that Frozenbyte hasn't lost its touch. I wouldn't necessarily expect a Trine 5 or anything, but clearly, this series has some life left in it."
