= Trine 3: The Artifacts of Power =

2015 video game

- Developer: Frozenbyte
- Publisher: Frozenbyte
- Director: Lauri Hyvärinen
- Producer: Jari Kantomaa
- Designer: Kim Juntunen
- Programmer: Jani Mäkinen
- Artist: Teemu Lintunen
- Writer: Maija Koivula
- Composer: Ari Pulkkinen
- Series: Trine
- Platforms: Microsoft Windows; Linux; OS X PlayStation 4 Nintendo Switch
- Release: Windows; August 20, 2015; Linux; November 5, 2015; OS X November 19, 2015; PlayStation 4 December 22, 2015; Nintendo Switch; July 29, 2019
- Genres: Puzzle-platform, action-adventure
- Modes: Single-player, multiplayer

Trine 3: The Artifacts of Power is a 2015 action-adventure puzzle-platform video game developed by Frozenbyte, released on August 20, 2015 for Microsoft Windows. It was made available on Linux, OS X and PlayStation 4 later in 2015. It is the sequel to Trine 2 and features a return of the series' three protagonists and medieval fantasy location. The game is the first in the series to feature fully 3D gameplay. A port to the Nintendo Switch was released in 2019.

A sequel, Trine 4: The Nightmare Prince, was released in 2019 to critical acclaim.

== Gameplay ==
Similar to its predecessors, Trine 3: The Artifacts of Power is an action-adventure platform game with puzzle elements, which requires the players to utilize the skills of three different returning characters: Pontius, Amadeus and Zoya. Abilities varied among characters. Pontius is a knight equipped with a sword and a shield to defend himself against enemies. Zoya is a thief that is equipped with arrows and a grappling hook, while Amadeus is a wizard that has the ability to manipulate and levitate objects. Players can swap between the three playable characters freely during the campaign. Trine 3 is the first game in the series to feature 3D gameplay, while the 2D gameplay remains the game's focus as with previous installments. The game also includes three-player co-operative multiplayer, special challenge levels and a level editor.

== Plot ==
As in Trine 2, the Trine artifact summons Amadeus the wizard, Pontius the knight and Zoya the thief from across the realm for a quest, this time defending the Astral Academy. While the artifact gives the trio the power of immortality, they are tired of being bound this way, and decide to return the power to the Trine in return for their freedom. Their plan fails, though, and the artifact shatters, releasing an evil spirit known as Sarek, who rushes to the Academy.

The trio ventures into the Academy and learn from the spirit of the Trine that Sarek was a powerful wizard who became invincible by sealing his heart away; in doing so he became insane. Since no one could locate his heart, the only alternative to stopping him was binding his body. Two sisters did battle with him; they were successful but died in the process, creating the three artifacts of power (previously seen in the first Trine): one of the sisters, known as Trine, had her spirit encased in the artifact of soul, the other in the artifact of mind, and Sarek himself in the artifact of body. The two sisters were able to use the combined powers of the two artifacts to keep Sarek subdued, until the Trine was damaged.

The Trine is willing to take back the power she granted the heroes and release them if they collect all her shards and repair her, then find and destroy Sarek's heart. The trio agrees and finds one such shard. Meanwhile, Sarek has managed to locate the artifact of mind within the Astral Academy and corrupt the spirit of Trine's sister. The game then ends and the story is left incomplete. An easter egg in Trine 4 reveals they were indeed able to restore the Trine and defeat Sarek.

== Development ==
The game was revealed by Frozenbyte on March 2, 2015. Alongside the announcement, a debut trailer was released. A nine-minute gameplay trailer of the game was released on April 9, 2015, showcasing the ways the three playable characters interact with the three-dimensional world. The game entered early access on April 21, 2015, so as to allow the company to receive player feedback regarding the new gameplay elements featured. The early access of the game only featured two maps, with the developers saying the full release would be "significantly longer". As promised, the game remained in the early access phase for "a few months" and was released on August 20, 2015 "initially" for Microsoft Windows. Ari Pulkkinen, the composer of the original Trine and Trine 2, returned to compose the music for Trine 3. The game's budget was $5.4 million, triple that of Trine 2.

The developer of the game called the introduction of 3D graphics something "challenging and time consuming", as the skills and the abilities of the three playable characters had to undergo overhaul and redesign without damaging the characters' characteristics. Trine 3: The Artifacts of Power was released on August 20, 2015 for Microsoft Windows. A public beta for Linux and OS X was made available in October 2015. Linux platforms received full support on November 5, 2015, followed by an OS X release on November 19, 2015. In December 2015, a PlayStation 4 version of the game was announced, releasing later that month on December 22, 2015. A port to the Nintendo Switch was released on July 29, 2019.

== Reception ==
Reception

Aggregate score
Aggregator	Score
Metacritic	PC: 68/100; PS4: 65/100; NS: 64/100

Upon release, players complained that the game was too short. Frozenbyte later responded that if they had extended the length of the game, it would have cost $15 million, a price that they could not afford. Joel Kinnunen, VP from Frozenbyte, added that,"[they] tried to make something too ambitious, and it ended up financially impossible". While the developer was proud of the game they had created, Kinnunen indicated at the time that the future for the franchise "is now in question".
