= Trine 2 =

2011 puzzle-platform video game

- Developer: Frozenbyte
- Publisher: Frozenbyte; Atlus USA (PS3 and X360): JP: Nintendo (Wii U)
- Director: Lauri Hyvärinen
- Producer: Joel Kinnunen
- Designer: Kim Juntunen
- Programmer: Jari Kantomaa
- Artist: Santtu Huotilainen
- Writer: Maija Koivula
- Composer: Ari Pulkkinen
- Series: Trine
- Engine: Storm3D
- Platforms: Microsoft Windows, macOS, Linux, PlayStation 3, Xbox 360, Wii U, PlayStation 4, Nvidia Shield, Switch, Xbox One
- Release: December 7, 2011: Windows, OS X; WW: December 7, 2011 Linux; WW: March 31, 2012 PlayStation 3; NA: December 20, 2011; EU: March 7, 2012 Xbox 360; WW: December 21, 2011 Wii U; NA: November 18, 2012; EU: November 30, 2012; AU: February 1, 2013; JP: January 22, 2014 PlayStation 4; NA: November 15, 2013; EU: November 29, 2013 Nvidia Shield; WW: July 22, 2014 Nintendo Switch; WW: February 18, 2019 Xbox One; WW: September 30, 2019
- Genre: Puzzle-platform
- Modes: Single-player, multiplayer

Trine 2 is a puzzle-platform game developed and published by Frozenbyte. It is the sequel to Trine and was released on Microsoft Windows, OS X, PlayStation 3, and Xbox 360 in December 2011, and later for Linux in March 2012. Trine 2 allows three players to play the iconic roles of a wizard, a thief, and a knight in a simultaneous cooperative mode. A Director's Cut edition was released via the Wii U's eShop on the console's launch day in all regions except Australia and Japan. The game was also released as a launch title for the PlayStation 4 in North America and Europe in 2013. On February 13, 2019, it was announced that a port to the Nintendo Switch would be released on February 18, 2019.

A successor, Trine 3: The Artifacts of Power, was released in 2015.

== Gameplay ==
Trine 2 is a puzzle-platform game, requiring the player to use the skills of the three characters, Amadeus the wizard, Zoya the thief, and Pontius the knight, to navigate each game level. As with the first game, the mystical "Trine" has bound the three characters together into one common entity, and thus the player controls only one character which can be switched to the other two at any time. Each of the characters has unique abilities: Amadeus can use magic to grab onto certain objects in the game world, and create boxes and planks to be used to get around; Zoya can strike at objects with her arrows, and grapple onto certain surfaces; and Pontius is strong in combat against foes, can bash apart walls, and deflect projectiles with his shield. A combination of these elements is necessary to complete each stage in the game's world.

Characters have individual life meters, and if one character's meter depletes, that character cannot be used until the next checkpoint is reached. If all three characters lose their life meter, the player must start back at the last checkpoint. Throughout the game world are special magical vials, and for every fifty of these collected, the player receives a skill point, which can be used to gain abilities through a skill tree for each character. These skill points can be used collectively for each of the three characters, and can be traded between them.

Trine 2 also supports up to three players in a cooperative mode. In this mode, each player controls one of the three characters, but all must be unique; three players will be forced to play as Amadeus, Zoya, and Pontius. Two players can switch characters as long as both agree to the swap. If a character dies, the other players can revive the character at the next checkpoint. The skill tree is shared among all characters, based on the hosting player's saved game.

Story elements are incorporated into the game through the use of an all-knowing narrator (voiced by Terence WiltonTerry Wilton) as well as in-game scripted sequences. Scattered throughout the levels are also letters, poems, and documents which further flesh out the backstory and provide additional insight into the game's characters.

== Plot ==
Trine 2 takes place several years after the events of the first game. The three heroes, Amadeus the wizard, Pontius the knight, and Zoya the thief, are summoned by the magical artifact known as the Trine to embark on a new adventure. Their journey begins when they encounter a mysterious light that leads them into an enchanted forest. They soon find out that a curse has fallen upon the kingdom, and they must help Princess Rosabel, who is desperate to save her sister Isabel and restore balance to the realm.

As they venture deeper into the forest, they uncover a twisted tale of sibling rivalry between the two princesses. Rosabel, consumed by jealousy of Isabel's magical powers, imprisoned her sister in an enchanted tree, causing the land to fall into chaos. The heroes eventually confront Rosabel, only to discover that Isabel has been held captive by her sister for years, causing the forest's overgrowth and allowing goblins to invade the kingdom. After defeating Rosabel, Isabel awakens and, despite the bitterness between them, dives into the waters to save her sister.

The game ends with the three heroes returning home after their victory, while the fate of the two princesses remains unclear. However, with Isabel's magic, the kingdom and forest are set to recover.

=== Goblin Menace ===
The heroes return home only to discover that the goblins they fought in the forest are launching an attack on their own kingdom. During the siege, Amadeus's wife, Margaret, is kidnapped by the goblins, leading the heroes on a new adventure to rescue her.

The trio travels across various locations, including a desert temple and the floating Cloudy Isles, where they discover that the goblins are led by an inventor named Wheeze. After battling Wheeze and his forces, the heroes find that Margaret was protected by the Trine all along, hidden in a shield of light due to her resemblance to an ancient goblin deity. With Margaret safe, the heroes return home, and the goblins’ invasion is thwarted.

== Development ==
The Humble Frozenbyte Bundle, one of the Humble Bundles, started on April 12, 2011, and featured five games from Frozenbyte, including the original Trine, as well as the games Shadowgrounds and Shadowgrounds: Survivor. It also contained an executable version along with source code for an unfinished game, Jack Claw, and a pre-order for their upcoming game, Splot. By April 22, 2011, the Humble Frozenbyte Bundle had surpassed $700,000. Most of the money generated by the sale went to finishing the development of Trine 2 after it was suggested by lead developer, Mike Donovan, that a sequel be made.

The Linux version was delayed from the rest to allow for additional development; it was the first Frozenbyte title ported to Linux in-house, with their other games having previously been ported instead by Alternative Games. Jukka Kokkonen, Frozenbyte's Senior Programmer, revealed that the actual porting was actually "easier than expected", although he did comment that they had some trouble with testing. The port was released as a beta in late March, and is to be released on services including Desura and Gameolith. Kokkonen stated that he hopes that Trine 2 "shows that Linux can provide a proper gaming experience" and that they are "very excited to see how Linux users react to the game.”

The basic porting process for the Wii U's Director's Cut edition was achieved by Frozenbyte in just two days, which gave the development team plenty of time to adjust visuals and implement the exclusive touch screen functionality, and subsequently made the game ready to be launched alongside the Wii U console launch date in all regions. According to Frozenbyte's sales and marketing manager Mikael Haveri, Nintendo's initial approach and close contact with their company helped support the process of releasing the game for Wii U, and subsequently made it Frozenbyte's first self-published title without the involvement of Atlus, the game's publisher for other platforms. The support for Trine 2: Director's Cut is cited as one of Nintendo's initial steps into reaching out to the independent video game development community. Haveri adds that working with Nintendo has been "very freeform" and positive.

== Expansions ==
=== Goblin Menace expansion ===
An expansion pack for the game entitled Trine 2: Goblin Menace was released September 7, 2012. It features six new levels, a new story, and several new skills which will also be available in the original game. Frozenbyte marketing director Mikael Haveri has also revealed that it will also feature several new puzzles based on light, water, low gravity and magnetic elements. The expansion, originally only released for the PC platforms, will be included alongside the Wii U release of the game, and the Wii U is the only non-PC console planned to receive this expansion.

On February 7, 2013, a Frozebyte representative reported on their website that due to relatively poor sales for Trine 2 on Xbox 360 Live Arcade and PlayStation 3 Network, the conversion for the expansion for these consoles would not be cost-effective, thus Trine 2: Goblin Menace was not likely to be seen on Xbox 360 or PlayStation 3.

=== Director's Cut edition ===
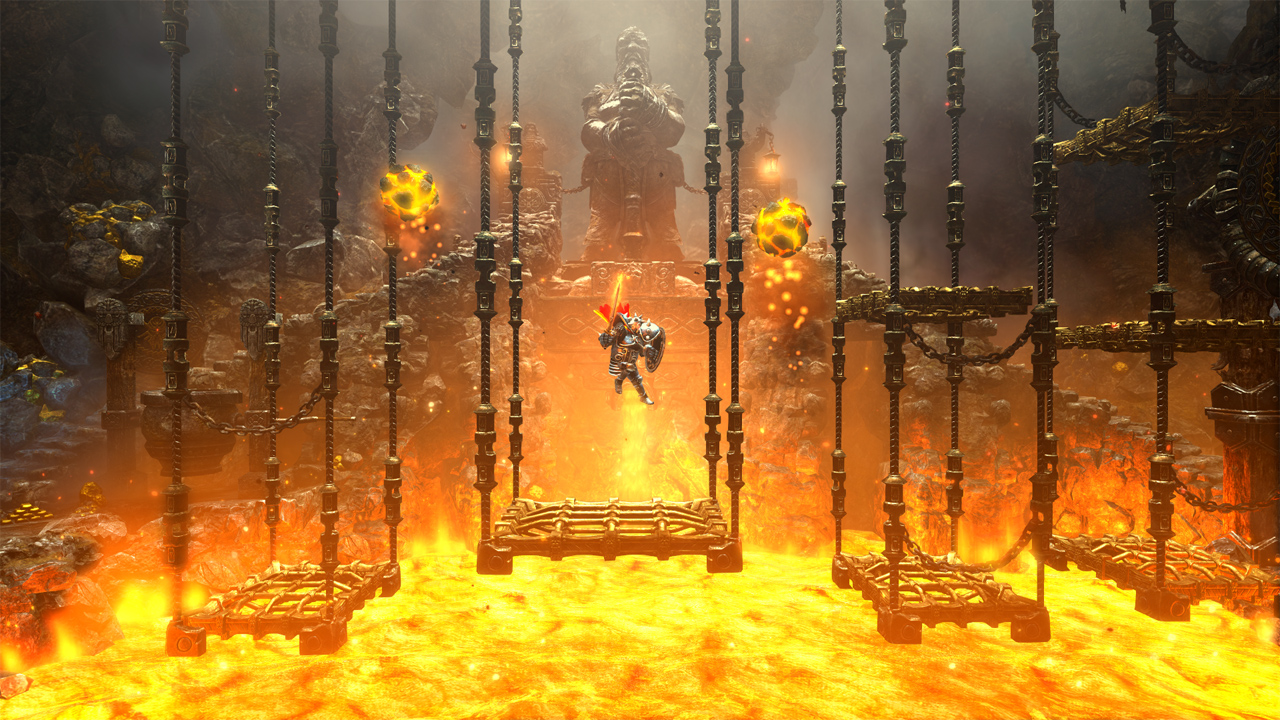
Pontius navigates platforms dangling over a pit of lava in this scene from the Dwarven Caverns chapter.

The Trine 2: Director's Cut edition, released at first only for Nintendo's Wii U console, features the original game with the Goblin Menace expansion, alongside the enhanced controls that take advantage of the GamePad controller, as well as an exclusive level called the "Dwarven Caverns". A multiplayer mode called Magic Mayhem was in development at one point but was later scrapped in favor of more focus on the Dwarven Caverns level. Director's Cut edition also features a flexible control scheme, especially for the game's multiplayer mode which is both local and online, where players can, alongside the GamePad, use Wii Remotes, Nunchuks, Wii U Pro Controllers, and even the original Wii Classic Controllers. Additionally, Frozenbyte has plans to include some Miiverse support at some point in the future, with Mikael Haveri citing that "it's opening up the possibilities of what you can do in terms of interaction with other players and so on." Other additions include minor things such as patching support, although the patching process is currently unknown at this time. The Wii U release is the only version of Trine 2 to be available in Japan, released on January 22, 2014, under the title Trine 2: Forest of Mystery and the Power of Three (TRINE 2 三つの力と不可思議の森, TRINE 2 mittsu no chikara to fukashigi no mori). The Japanese release was a courtesy of Nintendo.

=== Complete Story edition ===
A patch released June 6, 2013 for the Steam version of Trine 2 upgraded it to the Trine 2: Complete Story edition, if the Goblin Menace expansion had been previously purchased. This new edition includes the Dwarven Caverns level previously available only in the Director's Cut version from the Wii U. A cross-platform and DRM free release of Trine 2: Complete Story was then later made available as part of Humble Indie Bundle 9. The Complete Story edition was subsequently released on PlayStation 4 in 2013.

== Reception ==
Reception

Aggregate score
Aggregator	Score
Metacritic	PC: 84/100; PS3: 85/100; X360: 85/100; WIIU: 84/100; PS4: 84/100; NS: 87/100

Trine 2 received largely positive reviews, earning a score of 9/10 by IGN, and 84/100 for the Windows and Wii U versions on Metacritic, as well as a score of 85/100 for the game's release on the PlayStation 3 and Xbox 360.

By October 2014, Frozenbyte announced that the Trine series had sold over seven million copies worldwide.
