= Ari Pulkkinen =

- Born: 15 January 1982 (age 44); Helsinki, Finland
- Genres: Electronic music, orchestral music, rock music, folk music, ambient music, video game music
- Occupations: Composer, musician, sound designer
- Instrument: Piano
- Years active: 1999–present
- Label: AriTunes
- Website: www.aritunes.com

Ari Pulkkinen (born 15 January 1982) is a Finnish video game composer, musician and sound designer. He is best known for his work on music for the Angry Birds series, mainly the song "Angry Birds Theme".

== Biography ==
Pulkkinen was born in Helsinki. At the age of 6, he started studying piano and composed his first song at the age of 12. He was interested in the computer music demoscene and started making music with tracker software under the name "ArtZ" and "DJartz". He won many music competitions and made his first big public album to accompany a freeware game titled Starfight VI: Gatekeepers in 1999. Ari has never studied music composition academically.

In 2003, he was hired as in-house audio director to game development company Frozenbyte Inc. Where he made the original soundtracks and sound design for video games Shadowgrounds, Shadowgrounds: Survivor and Trine. In his spare time, Ari earned diplomas in Professional Audio Design and Producing and Further Education for Producers and Leads of the Finnish Game Industry with Adulta, and Music Technology with Sibelius Academy. After quitting Frozenbyte in 2008 (though he continues to have a professional relationship with them), Ari started his own sound production company AriTunes. Since then, he has made original soundtrack and sound design for over twenty projects, including video games such as Angry Birds, Dead Nation, Trine 2, Outland and Super Stardust HD. Ari released his music through AriTunes.

On 2 September 2011 in Video Game Heroes Concert, "Angry Birds Theme" was played by London Philharmonic Orchestra. This is the first time Ari's music was played by a full live orchestra.

On 4 October 2011, Ari won the Best Finnish Game Developer in 2011 Award due to his contribution in the Finnish game industry.

== Works ==
| Year | Title |
|---|---|
| 2000 | Starfight VI: Gatekeepers |
| 2005 | Shadowgrounds |
| 2007 | Super Stardust HD |
| 2007 | Shadowgrounds: Survivor |
| 2009 | Trine |
| 2009 | Angry Birds |
| 2010 | Angry Birds Seasons (Note: Composed "Trick or Treat", "Season's Greedings", "Hogs and Kisses", "Go Green, Get Lucky", "Easter Eggs", "Summer Pignic", and "Fairy Hogmother") |
| 2010 | Dead Nation |
| 2011 | Outland |
| 2011 | Bike Baron |
| 2011 | Trine 2 |
2012
| 2012 | Super Stardust Delta |
| 2012 | Trine 2: Goblin Menace |
| 2012 | Angry Birds Trilogy |
| 2013 | Resogun |
| 2015 | Just Dance 2016 (Note: Pulkkinen providied the "Balkan Blast" remix of Angry Birds Theme.) |
| 2016 | Alienation |
2017
| 2017 | Nex Machina |
| 2017 | Nine Parchments |
| 2019 | Trine 4: The Nightmare Prince |
| 2023 | Trine 5: A Clockwork Conspiracy |

== Noteworthy competition entries ==
- Assembly 2009 Music Compo – Rtzon King – Sovietski Electro (2nd place)
- Assembly 2004 Fast Music Compo – Summer Rain (1st place)
- Assembly 2003 Fast Music Compo – Back To the Roots (1st place)
- Assembly 2002 Fast Music Compo – Karjalan Haamu (2nd place)
- Assembly 2001 Fast Music Compo – Comrades (1st place)
