= Knights and Merchants: The Shattered Kingdom =

1998 video game

- Cover art by Larry Elmore
- Developer: Joymania Entertainment
- Publishers: Windows: EU: TopWare Interactive; NA: Interactive Magic; Linux: Linux Game Publishing
- Producer: James Seaman
- Designers: Peter Ohlmann; André Quass; Adam Sprys
- Programmer: Peter Ohlmann
- Artist: Adam Sprys
- Writer: Martin Thal
- Platforms: Windows; MorphOS; Mac OS; Linux
- Release: Windows: GER: September 18, 1998; NA: October 1998; EU: November 1998; Linux; March 13, 2007
- Genre: Real-time strategy
- Modes: Single-player, multiplayer

Knights and Merchants: The Shattered Kingdom, known as simply Knights and Merchants, is a medieval-time based real-time strategy (RTS) video game. It was developed by Joymania Entertainment (since changed to Joymania Development) and published by TopWare Interactive in 1998. The player takes the role of the captain of the palace guards and leads the soldiers and citizens to victory. An expansion pack was released in 2001, titled Knights and Merchants: The Peasants Rebellion.

== Gameplay ==
Knights and Merchants: The Shattered Kingdom has a single-player campaign that consists of 20 scenarios with scenario length ranging from around 5 minutes up to 7 hours or more depending on difficulty.

The game's tech tree is simple and straightforward, and most new technology is accessed upon new building completion. To begin, the player can only build a school house that trains basic workers, but as the game advances more buildings and units become available. When playing a scenario or multiplayer mode, the player's technological advancement is not restricted, however in the single-player campaign some buildings cannot be built until the player progresses to later missions. The AI always begins with a technological advantage against the player, allowing them to develop at a higher level.

The economy is complex, stemming from the game's variety of resources, ranging from wood and stone, to sausages and wine. Many resources need to be transported to other buildings to be refined, and then delivered - which presents the challenge of building placement and interconnecting (every building has to be connected by roads) as the player develops.

The citizens get hungry - from workers, to farmers, to soldiers. This creates a challenging dynamic for the player - between managing combat, resource gathering, city building, as well as making sure there is a stable food supply for all the units. Unlike many other RTS games, Knights and Merchants has no unit cap - aside from limited map size and hunger features, which help to limit the player's sustainable unit numbers.

The game offers a multiplayer mode by using either IPX, TCP/IP or Modem where up to 6 players can play. There are 10 different scenarios to choose from including a number which focus specifically on the combat element of the game.

=== Plot ===
Knights and Merchants recreates the era of the Middle Ages. Apart from the purely fictitious geography of the world, all game elements and scenes are based on the European, but more particularly, the Anglo-Saxon period, around 1200 A.D.

=== Economy ===
The economy is very complex in Knights and Merchants: The Shattered Kingdom, more so than most other RTS games, with a greater range of resources and a need to combine basic resources in a number of ways to create a functioning economy. For example, in order to get loaves of bread, the player is required to first build a farm to get wheat, a mill to get flour and a bakery to bake loaves of the flour. The many different resources in the game require a large amount of corresponding buildings and units in order to fully utilize them.

Every citizen and soldier must eat in the game meaning that the player needs to produce a great deal of food creating a more naturalistic limit on army size. There is no population limit in-game, instead population is limited by how much food is produced. If a unit is not fed for a sustained amount of time it will die.

The everyday life aspect of it is considered a notable feature. Many different structures can be placed, forcing the player to consider where and when to place each structure, this is also dependent on terrain and territory.

== Expansion pack ==
Knights and Merchants: The Peasants Rebellion is a standalone expansion pack. It includes the 20 original missions as well as a brand new campaign that consists of 14 missions, a scenario mode with 10 different scenarios, and new buildings and units. The game was released in 2001 for Windows, but only in a few countries. Later in 2002 it was released in additional countries and in 2005 it was finally released in the U.S.

== Reception ==
Reception

Aggregate score
Aggregator	Score
GameRankings	65%

Review scores
Publication	Score
CNET Gamecenter	7/10
Computer Games Strategy Plus	2.5/5
Computer Gaming World	2.5/5
GameSpot	5.5/10
IGN	5.9/10
Jeuxvideo.com	15/20
Next Generation	4/5
PC Gamer (US)	43%
PC PowerPlay	81%
PC Zone	76%

The PC version received mixed reviews according to the review aggregation website GameRankings. Next Generation, however, said that the game "may not break much new ground, but it follows footprints with style. So if you're tired of battling aliens, orcs, and the villains of Nod, it's a nice little alternative."
