= Outland (video game) =

2011 video game

- Original cover art depicting the nameless protagonist using both Light (blue) and Dark (red) energies
- Developer: Housemarque
- Publisher: Ubisoft
- Composer: Ari Pulkkinen
- Platforms: Xbox 360, PlayStation 3, Windows, Mac OS X, Linux
- Release: April 27, 2011: Xbox 360; WW: April 27, 2011 PlayStation 3; AU: June 1, 2011; EU: June 2, 2011; NA: June 14, 2011 Windows; WW: September 29, 2014 OS X; WW: December 21, 2014 Linux; WW: February 25, 2015
- Genres: Platform, Metroidvania
- Modes: Single-player, multiplayer

Outland is a platform game developed by Housemarque and published by Ubisoft. The game combines two-dimensional platforming with a polarity system similar to Treasure's Ikaruga and Silhouette Mirage. Outland was released on April 27, 2011 for Xbox 360 via Xbox Live Arcade. The PlayStation 3 version, which was supposed to be released the day before, was delayed because of the 2011 PlayStation Network outage before being released on PSN on June 1, 2011. A Microsoft Windows version was released on September 29, 2014, followed by a Mac OS X version on December 21 of the same year, and a Linux version on February 25, 2015. The game was removed from sale on Steam and the Humble Store in December 2018; it was made available on Steam again in October 2020, before being removed again in April 2024.

== Gameplay ==
Outland is a 2D platformer with action game elements. Gameplay mainly revolves around using Light (blue) and Dark (red) energies, which allows the player to pass through their respective barriers, and attack monsters born of the opposite alignment (e.g. use Light to attack Dark monsters).

Along the way, players learn special powers from large shrines, from simple melee attacks to the harnessing of Light and Dark energy. Players can also collect hidden objects called "Masks of the Gods" in order to unlock extras such as concept art or enhanced in-game abilities.

Players also have an option to experience the entire storyline online with a friend in co-operative mode. There are also co-op challenges scattered throughout the world that can be unlocked and played when in co-op mode.

In addition to the main storyline, there is an Arcade Mode that puts the player to the test by putting a set time for the player to traverse throughout an entire region and defeat its protector. For example, in the Jungle's Arcade Mode, the player has 15 minutes to travel throughout the entire Jungle and defeat the Golem in the end. The highest scores are posted online on a leaderboard. Flipping a switch, pausing the game, and dying halt the timer. Arcade scores increase with multipliers that drop from enemies, and a bonus is given depending on how much time is left after the protector is defeated. An Arcade chapter for one area is unlocked as soon as the area itself is unlocked.

== Plot ==
In the present day, one man had started to experience dreams and visions of the past. A shaman told the man of a battle 30,000 years ago between a great hero and the two Sisters of Chaos—one who controls Light from the Sun, and one who controls Darkness from the Moon. The Sisters were imprisoned after the battle, but the hero had perished in the process. The shaman informed the man that he was the hero's reincarnation, that the Sisters of Chaos have apparently escaped their imprisonment, and that he was the only one who could stop them.

The man encounters a large shrine at the Crossroads of the World where he experiences one last vision of the past. The player controls the hero from 30,000 years ago as he makes his way through the destruction of the world to defeat the Sisters at the Temple of Eternity. The vision terminates before the fight as the narrator describes the result. Back in the present day, the man explores four areas branching from the Crossroads: the Jungle, the Underworld, the City, and the Sky. Each area is populated by a variety of creatures born from Light, Dark, or neutral energies, as well as one large protector that has been corrupted by Chaos. After defeating a protector, a rune depicting it is activated in the Crossroads shrine, triggering a short speech from the narrator about the protector and their corruption. When all four protectors are defeated and four of the five runes have been activated, the shrine teleports the man to the Temple of Eternity.

After traversing the Temple, the man meets the Sisters, who have been waiting to break free from their imprisonment to "uncreate" the world and return it to Chaos. In the ensuing battle, the man defeats the Sisters and prepares to deal the final blow when the Temple collapses. The Sisters are awestruck by the beauty and tranquility of the world, a product of both time and mankind's efforts. The Sisters humbly surrender to the man and retreat, one to the Sun and one to the Moon. The spirit of the ancient hero escapes from the man's body as their work is complete.

== Reception ==
Reception

Aggregate score
Aggregator	Score		
Aggregator	PC	PS3	Xbox 360
Metacritic	79/100	83/100	84/100

Review scores
Publication	Score		
Publication	PC	PS3	Xbox 360
Edge	N/A	N/A	7/10
Eurogamer	N/A	N/A	8/10
Game Informer	N/A	N/A	9/10
GamePro	N/A	N/A	4/5
GameRevolution	N/A	N/A	A−
GameSpot	N/A	9/10	9/10
GameTrailers	N/A	N/A	8.3/10
GameZone	N/A	8/10	N/A
Giant Bomb	N/A	4/5	4/5
IGN	N/A	9/10	9/10
Joystiq	N/A	N/A	4/5
Official Xbox Magazine (US)	N/A	N/A	8/10
PlayStation: The Official Magazine	N/A	8/10	N/A
The Daily Telegraph	N/A	N/A	8/10

Awards
Publication	Award
IGN	2011 Editors Choice
Eurogamer	Game of the Week
FIGMA	Finnish Game of the Year 2012

The game received "favorable" reviews on all platforms according to the review aggregation website Metacritic.

Tom McShea of GameSpot called the game an "expertly crafted platformer." The reviewer praised the game's visual style, music, and co-op. IGN also called it "a hell of a game, and you should play it posthaste."

The Escapist gave the Xbox 360 version a score of four stars out of five and said that it "will put your skills to the test, but strikes a pleasant balance between frustration and triumph. It's not the easiest game in the world, but the effort it takes to master is well worth it." The Daily Telegraph similarly gave it a score of eight out of ten and called it "a game which is fun to play simply for the joy of playing, and when you throw in the ability to play through the story with a second person, along with some additional challenge areas designed exclusively for co-op play, Outland is [a] highly appealing, highly enjoyable downloadable title." The A.V. Club gave it a B and stated, "Boss battles are another highlight, a great example being a robed figure who can unpredictably cause colored rubble to come whizzing by from any direction." Wired gave the PlayStation 3 version a score of eight stars out of ten in its early review and called it "a tumultuous blend of Prince of Persia-style jumping action and the "bullet hell" of insane shooters like Ikaruga. It's complex, difficult and a lot of fun."

Outland was awarded as "Best PSN Game of 2011" by IGN and "Best Download-only Console Game 2011" by GameSpot.
