= Cold War (video game) =

2005 video game

- Developer: Mindware Studios (Note: Ported to Mac OS X by Runesoft.)
- Publishers: DreamCatcher Games; Runesoft (OS X); Linux Game Publishing (Linux)
- Composer: Ján Dušek
- Platforms: Windows, Xbox, Mac OS X, Linux
- Release: NA: 27 September 2005; AU: 7 November 2005; EU: 11 November 2005; Mac OS X: WW: 31 July 2006; Linux: WW: 4 August 2006
- Genre: Stealth
- Mode: Single-player

Cold War is a 2005 stealth video game developed by the Czech developer Mindware Studios, and published by DreamCatcher Games (Runesoft for Mac OS X and Linux Game Publishing for Linux). The game is similar to the Tom Clancy's Splinter Cell series of games in that it uses a stealth-action system of gameplay. The game distinguishes itself by adding an item invention system where the player can use seemingly useless objects to create new tools and weapons. Also, the story of the game centers on a civilian reporter, so no extremely acrobatic moves are available to the player. Another aspect of the game is that the player can take many different approaches to winning the game.

== Plot ==
Cold War takes place in 1986 and follows the story of a freelance journalist named Matthew Carter who finds himself in the midst of an international conspiracy that aims to control the Soviet Union. Twelve hours after arriving in Moscow in hopes of gathering material for a Pulitzer Prize winning story, he finds himself thrown into the KGB's political prison and framed for an attempted murder of the president. The reason for this was unknown, however, an unidentified female agent replaced his original camera with a prototype X-ray camera. Carter noticed this unknown device and decided to capture a fire extinguisher for testing, but the chemicals in the flash powder caused the object to explode, making him visible to the guards.

Inside the prison, he met a former Soviet agent whom he agreed to accompany. The two escaped by using a shaft to go to the outer areas of the prison.

Using only recovered weapons and improvised gadgets, he must now evade or overcome elite Soviet forces and defeat the conspiracy before he is sent to a Siberian prison camp or killed.

== Development ==
The Xbox version of the game went gold on September 15, 2005.

Cold War is now supported on Insignia, a revival server for original Xbox Games.

== Reception ==
Reception

Aggregate score
| Aggregator | Score | |
| Aggregator | PC | Xbox |
|---|---|---|
| Metacritic | 64/100 | 60/100 |

Review scores
| Publication | Score | |
| Publication | PC | Xbox |
|---|---|---|
| Game Informer | 6/10 | 6/10 |
| GameSpot | 6.5/10 | 6.5/10 |
| GameSpy | 2/5 | N/A |
| IGN | 5.8/10 | 5.8/10 |
| Official Xbox Magazine (US) | N/A | 4.5/10 |
| PALGN | 4/10 | N/A |
| PC Gamer (US) | 74% | N/A |
| TeamXbox | N/A | 5.3/10 |
| VideoGamer.com | 5/10 | 5/10 |
| X-Play | N/A | 2/5 |

The PC and Xbox versions received "mixed" reviews according to the review aggregation website Metacritic.

The Linux version received more positive reviews, with Phoronix stating the game was "truly phenomenal" and that it's "one of the best single-player shooters we have ever played on Linux." LinuxGames awarded it 8.5 out of 10, commenting that the game was "the most enjoyable Linux gaming experience of 2006 so far."
