= Has-Been Heroes =

2017 action video game

- Developer: Frozenbyte
- Publisher: GameTrust
- Engine: Storm3D
- Platforms: Microsoft Windows; Nintendo Switch; PlayStation 4 Xbox One
- Release: NA: 28 March 2017; PAL: 4 April 2017
- Genres: Action, roguelike, strategy
- Mode: Single-player

Has-Been Heroes is an action video game developed by Frozenbyte and published by GameTrust. The game was released on 28 March 2017 in North America and in Europe and Australia on 4 April 2017 on Nintendo Switch, PlayStation 4, Microsoft Windows, and Xbox One. This game is Gamestop exclusive and was only sold through Gamestop stores at launch.

== Gameplay ==
Has-Been Heroes is an action, strategy video game with roguelike elements. The game features a mixture of turn-based strategy and real-time strategy mechanics.

== Release ==
Has-Been Heroes is being developed by Frozenbyte and published by GameTrust. The game was announced in January 2017. It launched on Nintendo Switch, PlayStation 4, Microsoft Windows, and Xbox One on 28 March 2017.

== Reception ==
Reception

Aggregate score
| Aggregator | Score |
|---|---|
| Metacritic | (PC) 63/100 (PS4, XOne) 61/100 (NS) 53/100 |

Review scores
| Publication | Score |
|---|---|
| Destructoid | (NS) 4.5/10 |
| Electronic Gaming Monthly | (NS) 4/10 |
| GameSpot | (NS) 5/10 |
| Hardcore Gamer | (PS4) 3/5 |
| IGN | 6.1/10 |
| Jeuxvideo.com | (PC) 15/20 |
| Nintendo Life | (NS) 5/10 |
| Nintendo World Report | (NS) 7/10 |
| Pocket Gamer | (NS) 3/5 |
| Push Square | (PS4) 6/10 |
| Metro | (NS) 3/10 |

Has-Been Heroes received "mixed or average reviews" from professional critics according to review aggregator website Metacritic. While the game received praise for its combat system, criticism was directed at its repetitive gameplay and high difficulty level.
