= Trine (video game) =

2009 puzzle-platform video game

- PAL region box art for the PC version
- Developer: Frozenbyte
- Publishers: Nobilis; Frozenbyte (Enchanted Edition)
- Director: Lauri Hyvärinen
- Producer: Jukka Kokkonen
- Designer: Kim Juntunen
- Writer: Joel Kinnunen
- Composer: Ari Pulkkinen
- Series: Trine
- Engine: Storm3D
- Platforms: Windows; PlayStation 3; Mac OS X; Linux; OS X; PlayStation 4; Wii U; Nintendo Switch
- Release: July 2, 2009: Windows; WW: July 2, 2009; PlayStation 3; EU: September 17, 2009; NA: October 22, 2009; Mac OS X; WW: November 2, 2010; Linux; WW: April 12, 2011; Enchanted Edition; Windows; WW: July 24, 2014; Linux, OS X; WW: December 11, 2014; PlayStation 4; PAL: December 17, 2014; NA: December 23, 2014; Wii U; NA: March 12, 2015; EU: March 26, 2015; Nintendo Switch; WW: November 9, 2018
- Genres: Puzzle-platform, action-adventure
- Modes: Single-player, multiplayer

Trine is a puzzle-platform video game developed by Frozenbyte and published by Nobilis. The game was originally released for Microsoft Windows in 2009, and has since been ported to Linux, OS X, and game consoles. The game takes place in a medieval fantasy setting and allows players to take control of three separate characters who can battle enemies and solve environmental puzzles.

A sequel, titled Trine 2, was released in 2011. A remake of Trine, titled Trine: Enchanted Edition, was released in 2014. The enchanted edition uses Trine 2's updated engine, and includes online multiplayer. The third installment in the series, Trine 3: The Artifacts of Power, was released on August 20, 2015. A fourth installment, Trine 4: The Nightmare Prince, was released on October 8, 2019. A fifth installment, Trine 5: A Clockwork Conspiracy, was released August 31, 2023.

== Gameplay ==
The player controls and switches between three different characters (a thief, a knight, and a wizard) to try to complete levels. There is also a cooperative play feature, whereby multiple players can join in at any time to control different characters simultaneously. Each character has their own health and energy meter. Energy is used for certain weapons and abilities, and is replenished by blue-colored bottles found throughout levels. Health is replenished by collecting heart-shaped containers, which result from destroying certain enemies.

The player also has a single experience rating that is shared among all characters, and is incremented by acquiring green-colored bottles found throughout levels and by defeating enemies. Every 50 experience points, each character is given one point towards the purchase of upgrades to their abilities. Treasure chests are also spread throughout levels, each containing a charm that offers the bearing character new or upgraded abilities. The player can transfer these objects between characters, though some will only have an effect on certain characters.

Checkpoints are spread throughout levels, in the form of silver orbs on pedestals. Upon crossing a checkpoint, any deceased characters are brought back to life, and any characters below a certain amount of health and energy are replenished up to that amount. The amount of energy and health replenished is dependent upon the difficulty setting chosen by the player. When a character dies, the player must choose another living character to continue playing the level. If all three characters die, the player is sent back to the last checkpoint crossed, and all three characters are resurrected.

Enemies primarily include walking skeletons, spiders, and bats, along with boss characters, like giant skeletons and other large creatures. Some skeletons are armed with swords, others with bows and arrows, some spit fire, and some have shields. Skeletons are capable of scaling walls. Other dangers include lava, fireballs, giant sharp pendulums, and various other booby traps.

Trine uses Nvidia's PhysX physics engine to provide objects and characters with full physics interaction.

=== Characters ===
Zoya the Thief, the first of the three heroes introduced in the game, is voiced by Vicky Krueger. The Thief's weapon is her bow and arrow. The bow can be “charged” by holding down the fire button before releasing, and longer charges make for farther, straighter shots. The Thief also has a grappling hook which can be fired at wooden surfaces. Regular arrows and the grappling hook are unlimited, and do not diminish the Thief's energy. At some point during the game, the Thief can acquire the ability to shoot flaming arrows, which do diminish her energy. Flaming arrows inflict more damage on enemies, can break certain objects, and can light torches found in certain dark areas of the game. The Thief's possible upgrades include shooting more arrows with each shot, faster charging of the bow, and more damage inflicted with the flaming arrow. She is the quietest of the three heroes, and takes a strong liking to the magical forest ruins presented towards the end of the game.

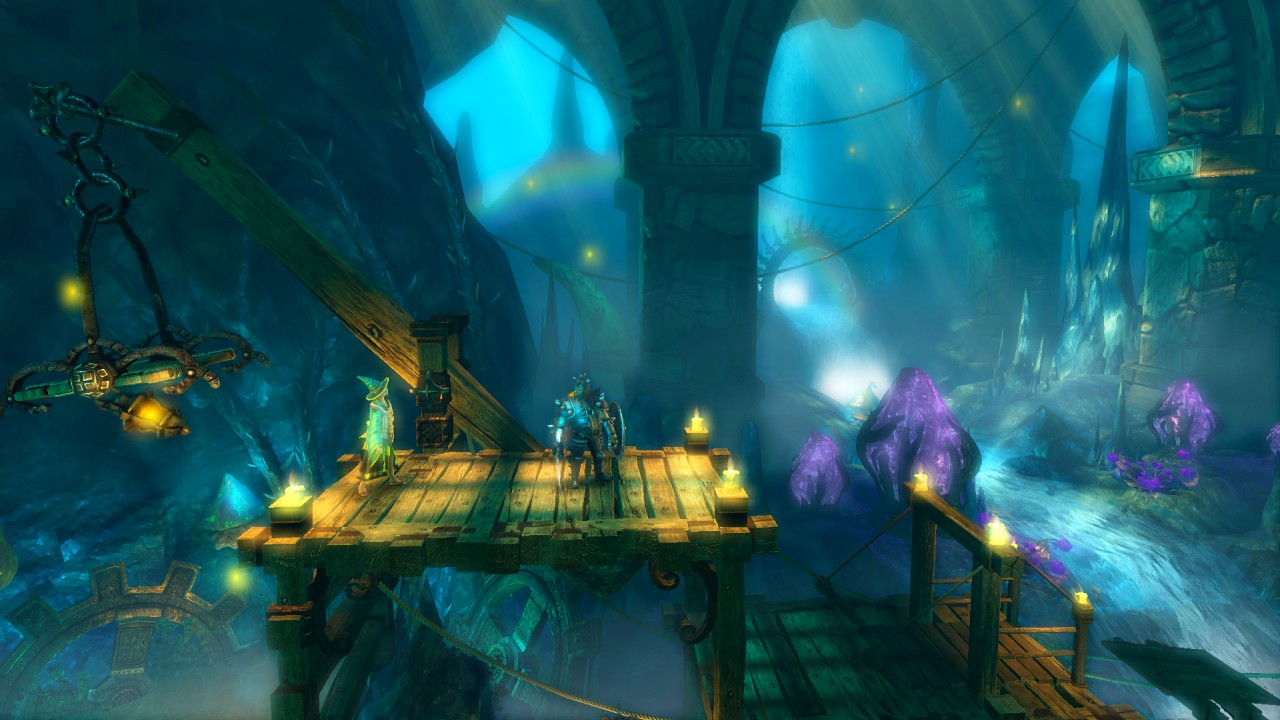
Screenshot including Amadeus the Wizard and Pontius the Knight

Amadeus the Wizard, voiced by Kevin Howarth, has the ability to use sorcery to move objects remotely, as well as conjure new objects into existence. Initially, the Wizard is only able to conjure a cube-shaped object. At some point in the game, he acquires the ability to conjure an oblong platform (called a "plank" in the game). The box and plank behave as normal objects, obeying the laws of physics and gravity. The Wizard later acquires the ability to conjure a floating object shaped like a square pyramid (called a floating platform in the game), which remains at a fixed point in space unless the Wizard moves it.

Conjured objects are primarily used to help overcome obstacles and reach difficult areas. The plank, for example, can be used to bridge gaps. All conjuring and remote moving drains the Wizard's energy. The Wizard has no traditional attacks, however he can crush certain enemies by hurling objects into them. He can also block attacks by conjuring or moving objects in their path. The Wizard's possible upgrades include the ability to conjure more than one box or plank into simultaneous existence (whereas initially only one of each could be on the screen at once), changing future conjured floating platforms into wood (so that the Thief can attach her grappling hook to it), and making the floating platform into an explosive that the Knight or thief can trigger. In the game, he is shown as being wise but also foolish, cowardly but determined, and imagines himself to be a bit of a ladies man.

Pontius the Knight's initial weapons are his sword and shield. He is voiced in the game by Brian Bowles, and is presented as a brave and loyal companion, not that bright, and has a strong love for food and drink. The player can at some point acquire a flaming sword during the game, which the Knight can use to inflict more damage as well as use to light torches; the player can also pick up a sledgehammer for Pontius. The Knight also has the ability to lift certain objects and hurl them, and his shield can be used to deflect enemy attacks, as well as falling objects and projectiles. The Knight's possible upgrades include additional sword damage, charging attacks, and additional sledgehammer attacks.

== Plot ==
Trine takes place in a forsaken and ruined kingdom. After enjoying a period of great peace, the king died without leaving an heir, plunging the kingdom into political instability. Taking advantage of the chaos, an undead army suddenly appeared and attacked, forcing the inhabitants to abandon the realm, save for those few souls brave enough to face the perils that had now befallen it.

The game's story is primarily told by an all knowing narrator voiced by Terry Wilton. Speaking after the fact, he fills in plot details in between the levels, as well as introducing and concluding the game.

After some time, the Astral Academy, an institution of magical studies, is evacuated due to the undead menace; Zoya the Thief sees this as an opportunity to search the academy for treasure. Unknown to her, Amadeus the Wizard is just waking up after sleeping for a fortnight due to a backfired potion he prepared while trying to learn the fireball spell; he realizes he must escape immediately. Finally, Pontius the Knight had also arrived, convinced that it was his duty to protect the academy. The three meet at the shrine of ancient treasure and, touching a magical object at the same time, disappear. The Wizard recalls that the treasure is actually an artifact called the Trine, which has the power to bind souls. This results in only one of them being able to physically exist, with the other two being forced to remain inside the Trine. Amadeus also remembers that the Trine was connected to the legend of a guardian, whose tomb could be found under the Astral Academy.

Searching for a way to free themselves of the Trine's effect, the three heroes explore the catacombs under the academy, finding the guardian's tomb. The Wizard deciphers some of the inscriptions inscribed on it and discovers that there were once three artifacts: one for the soul, one for the mind and one for the body, each protected by a guardian. The guardians used the three objects to maintain peace throughout the kingdom. Amadeus believes that reuniting the three artifacts might undo the spell binding their souls. The inscriptions also suggest that the artifact of the mind was guarded in the castle of the old king. The trio searches the castle; while they do not find the artifact, they learn from the king's journal that the three relics were originally created in some ruins immersed in a large forest, the home of the three guardians.

In the ruins, one of the guardians give the heroes visions of the past. These ruins were the resting place of the artifact of body, but an earthquake left its shrine vulnerable and it was stolen. It was then somehow paired with the artifact of the mind. Without the Trine, the artifact of souls, the other two became tainted and gave birth to an evil tower and the undead, creatures with a physical body and capable of thought, but devoid of purpose and righteousness. The trio ascends the tower, avoiding the obstacles created by the tormented soul of the old king and combines the Trine with the two lost artifacts, unbinding their souls. The undead are cleansed through the kingdom, allowing it to eventually recover, with the Wizard, the Thief and the Knight proclaimed as its heroes. The game ends with the narrator describing what happens to the three heroes; Pontius gives in to his true passion and becomes the new king's royal ale provider, Zoya is given reign over the forest ruins, and Amadeus marries a lady called Margaret, who gives birth to triplets that master the fireball as infants.

== Development ==
Trine was originally started as a side-project by Jukka Kokkonen, Frozenbyte's senior programmer, while the rest of the team was working on another project. The other project ran into publisher and funding problems however, and the team decided to focus their efforts instead on developing Trine.

== Release ==
The game was first released for Windows on July 3, 2009. The PlayStation Network version was to be released in July 2009, but last-minute bugs discovered in testing caused a delay. It was released on September 17, 2009, in Europe and on October 22, 2009, in North America. A port of the game to OS X was released on November 2, 2010.

The game was later ported to Linux by Alternative Games, with the finished port being first released as part of the Humble Frozenbyte Bundle. A version for Xbox Live Arcade published by Atlus was in development, but was never released.

On June 18, 2014, a beta for Trine: Enchanted Edition was released. It ports the game to Trine 2 engine and adds online multiplayer. It was officially released on July 24, 2014, on Windows, PlayStation 4 and Wii U. Partnered with GameTrust, Trine: Enchanted Edition was announced and released on the Nintendo Switch on November 9, 2018.

== Reception and legacy ==
Reception

Aggregate score
| Aggregator | Score |
|---|---|
| Metacritic | PC: 80/100; PS3: 83/100; WIIU: 80/100; NS: 73/100 |

Review scores
| Publication | Score |
|---|---|
| IGN | 8.2/10 |
| Good Game | 15/20 |

Award
| Publication | Award |
|---|---|
| GameSpot | "Best Downloadable Game"; Editor's Choice award (2009) |

Trine received generally favorable reviews, according to review aggregator Metacritic. Trine won GameSpot's "Best Downloadable Game" Editor's Choice award at Electronic Entertainment Expo 2009.

PC Format magazine praised the game's "stunning attention to detail throughout", and added that its "beautifully fluid game mechanics are impossible not to appreciate". IT Reviews recommended Trine, and concluded: "Trine is an aesthetically pleasing and well executed puzzle platformer, with a distinct addictive streak when it comes to fully exploring the levels in order to upgrade your characters to their maximum power. When you're done with single player, the multiplayer mode adds extra life to the game, as the experience is genuinely different." IGN was more reserved, saying that "a lack of enemy variety, disappointing conclusion, and the wonky multiplayer keep Trine from greatness, but this is still a highly recommended puzzle platformer." The Australian video game talk show Good Game's reviewers both gave Trine 15/20.

In February 2011, Frozenbyte announced Trine had sold approximately 400,000 copies across all platforms. Later that year on December 8, shortly before the release of the sequel, they stated that sales of the game had by then grown to 1.1 million copies. In October 2014, Frozenbyte announced that the Trine series had sold 7 million copies by then.

In November 2013, an announcer pack featuring the voice of the narrator was released for the multiplayer online battle arena game, Dota 2.

== Sequels ==
To date, four sequels to Trine have been developed by Frozenbyte. Trine 2 was released in December 2011 for Windows, PlayStation 3, and Xbox 360, with later ports to the Wii U, PlayStation 4, and Nintendo Switch. Trine 2 included the series' first downloadable content pack, the Goblin Menace. Trine 3: The Artifacts of Power was released for personal computers in August 2015 with later ports for the PlayStation 4 and Nintendo Switch. Trine 3 veered from the previous games by making the gameplay based on 3D platforming, rather than the 2.5D of the previous two games, and generally was not as well-received due to this change. Trine 4: The Nightmare Prince was released in October 2019 for personal computer, PlayStation 4, Xbox One, and Nintendo Switch, with a return to the 2.5D style of the first two games. Alongside Trine 4, the Trine: Ultimate Collection has been released containing all four games and additional content released up to that point as well as physical collectible items for the physical version of the game. Trine 5: A Clockwork Conspiracy was released on August 31, 2023.
