= Shadwen =

2016 video game

- Steam banner
- Developer: Frozenbyte
- Publisher: Frozenbyte
- Platforms: Linux, macOS, PlayStation 4, Windows
- Release: 17 May 2016
- Genre: Stealth
- Mode: Single-player

Shadwen is a stealth video game developed and published by Frozenbyte. The game was released for macOS, Linux, macOS, PlayStation 4, and Windows in May 2016.

== Gameplay ==
Shadwen is a stealth video game played from a third-person view.

== Plot ==
An assassin named Shadwen embarks on a quest to kill the king and must also protect a young girl named Lily. Lily's father was taken to a quarry by kingsmen, and her mother died in the recent spring. She kept herself alive by finding food and shelter throughout the summer, but struggled to feed herself as the weeks went on. She meets Shadwen while trying to steal apples from a tree in the city graveyard. Her mother used to tell her stories where kind and gentle people came out on top. Her opinion of Shadwen can change depending on if she sees Shadwen kill people or not. Shadwen lived in the Dark Forest and was hired by the current king to kill the former king. The current king went back on his word to pay her and instead burned down the forest where she lived to try and kill her. Seeking revenge, Shadwen makes her way to his castle to either end his life or exact payment.

== Development and release ==
Shadwen was developed by Frozenbyte. The game was announced in December 2015. The game was released for macOS, Linux, macOS, PlayStation 4, and Windows on 17 May 2016. The PlayStation 4 version is notable for being one of the very few PlayStation 4 games not playable on the PlayStation 5 with backwards compatibility, due to a loading screen bug that cannot be fixed.

== Reception ==
Reception

Aggregate score
Aggregator	Score
Metacritic	(PC) 53/100 (PS4) 51/100

Review scores
Publication	Score
4Players	(PC) 47%
Destructoid	(PC) 4/10
GamesMaster	(PS4) 37%
Hardcore Gamer	(PC) 3/5
PC Gamer (UK)	(PC) 60%
Push Square	(PS4) 3/10
The Games Machine (Italy)	4.5/10
Metro	(PS4) 3/10

The PC and PlayStation 4 versions received "mixed or average" reviews, according to the review aggregation website Metacritic. Destructoid reviewer Joe Parlock was disappointed in the PC version, noting that it wasted the potential of a really cool premise. Hardcore Gamer writer Jordan Helm's review was more positive in his critique, saying that the tactically-focus stealth gameplay enticed him to continue playing the game.
