= Shadowgrounds: Survivor =

2007 video game

- Developer: Frozenbyte
- Publishers: Frozenbyte; Meridian4; Linux Game Publishing (Linux)
- Composer: Ari Pulkkinen
- Engine: Storm3D
- Platforms: Microsoft Windows, Linux, Mac OS X
- Release: Windows: NA: November 14, 2007 (Steam); NA: December 6, 2007 (Retail); EU: January 24, 2008; UK: June 20, 2008; Linux; September 18, 2009; OS X April 13, 2011
- Genre: Top-down shooter
- Modes: Single-player, Multiplayer

Shadowgrounds: Survivor is a 2007 top-down shooter game developed by Frozenbyte as the sequel to Shadowgrounds. It features three new playable characters, a new "Survival" mode, graphics enhanced from its predecessor, and an integrated physics engine.

== Gameplay ==
Like Shadowgrounds, the game is a fast-paced top-down shooter. This time however, the game allows for three playable characters which can utilise an RPG-like upgrade system for both their weapons and character attributes. This is in contrast to the original game, where only weapon upgrades were handled in this manner. Most of the weapons from the previous game also make a return in Survivor, although many function slightly different and some new weapons have been added. In addition, in some levels the player can control Sentry guns and a Mech.

Compared to the previous game, the basic gameplay has also been tightened, with Survivor focusing more on gun-play than on side-quests. No PDA or computer screens are available for the player to read, and most missions simply require the player to "survive" and reach the ending rather than completing any specific tasks. Those that do usually feature critical plot points, though most of the games story comes in the form of level loading screen text read by each main character.

Also new to the game is the addition of the "Survival" mode. Instead of trying to complete specific missions or tasks, a player selects which character they wish to be and a map, based on some of the ones in the single player campaign, and battles aliens until their health runs out. The more kills you accomplish and the longer you survive affects your final score, which is kept in a score table. The goal is to beat yours and other's previous scores. "Survival" missions become available upon completing their counterpart levels in the single-player campaign.

== Plot ==
Shadowgrounds: Survivor tells the story of three survivors who join forces with the last remaining human resistance in the colony of Ganymede in the heated battle against the ongoing alien onslaught. These are, in order of introduction, Luke "Marine" Giffords (voiced by Noah Lee Margetts) who is a soldier, Bruno "Napalm" Lastmann (voiced by Andrew Wincott) who works in pest control, and Isabel "Sniper" Larose (voiced by Laurence Bouvard) who is a scout. The game begins with Luke fighting his way back to the colony of New Atlantis, where he hopes he can find other survivors of the initial alien attack. While doing so, he receives a message from MacTiernan (voiced by Jay Simon), who is in charge of the defence of the colony. He asks all survivors to come and rescue him, so that he can find a way to fight back.

Meanwhile, Bruno is waging his own battle for survival, and trying to find his own path back to New Atlantis. Luke eventually finds MacTiernan and, with him in toe, commandeers a small ship which they hope to take back to the colony. However, the ship fails and crashes far from New Atlantis, forcing Luke to find his own way back on foot with the goal of finding help. MacTiernan, however, remains stuck inside the stricken vessel, but manages to get its communication system working again. From there, he continues to message Luke and the other survivors. By this point, Isabel, who was manning a guard post far outside of the colony, is trying to find her own way back.

A massive alien army, much larger than anything that has come before it, is approaching and Isabel is intent to warn New Atlantis before it is too late. She also comes into contact with MacTiernan, and following his instructions discovers some critical data while on her way back to the colony. She also takes control of an experimental Mech, which she uses to blast her way back to New Atlantis, where she is united with MacTiernan, Bruno, and Luke. From there, MacTiernan devises a plan to save the colony by utilizing its massive array of defence turrets. However, they lack the man power to operate them all manually, so the automated AI code that was previously retrieved by Isabel must be fed into them for this plan to work.

Unfortunately, the only place that this can be accomplished is the Defence Mainframe, which is already swarming with aliens. One of the survivors must fight his or her way to the mainframe with the use of the Mech, and feed in the data. The player gets to choose between Luke, Bruno and Isabel, as one of them completes the final mission, activating the turrets and defeating the forces of the advancing alien army.

== Release ==
Frozenbyte announced a port of the game to Linux on March 13, 2008. The finished port, which was made by IGIOS and published by Linux Game Publishing, was released on September 18, 2009.

It was later released for a limited amount of time as part of a Humble Indie Bundle package. Towards the end of the bundle initiative, the Shadowgrounds and Shadowgrounds: Survivor source code (but not their graphics or level editor) was publicly released. The source-code license prohibits commercial use and permits Frozenbyte to change the license terms at will.

== Reception ==
Reception

Aggregate score
| Aggregator | Score |
|---|---|
| Metacritic | 79/100 |

Review scores
| Publication | Score |
|---|---|
| 4Players | 78% |
| Eurogamer | 7/10 |
| GameRevolution | B+ |
| GameZone | 7.7/10 |
| IGN | 7.6/10 |
| Jeuxvideo.com | 14/20 |
| PC Format | 90% |
| PC Gamer (UK) | 79% |
| PC Gamer (US) | 73% |
| PC Zone | 77% |

Shadowgrounds: Survivor received "generally favorable reviews" according to the review aggregation website Metacritic.

== See also ==
- Shadowgrounds
