= Desura =

Digital distribution platform

- The Desura Linux client installing the game Dungeons of Dredmor
- Original author: DBolical Pty Ltd.
- Developer: OnePlay
- Release: December 18, 2010
- Platform: Microsoft Windows; OS X Linux
- Type: Digital game distribution platform (formerly); Browser game site (currently)
- Website: www.desura.com
- Repository: github.com/desura/desura-app

Desura was a digital distribution platform for the Microsoft Windows, Linux and OS X platforms. The service distributed games and related media online, with a primary focus on small independent game developers rather than larger companies. Desura contained automated game updates, community features, and developer resources. The client allowed users to create and distribute game mods as well.

Many independent developers (for example Scott Cawthon) and small companies published their content on Desura including Frozenbyte, Frictional Games, Introversion Software, Basilisk Games, S2 Games, Linux Game Publishing, RuneSoft, Running with Scissors, Interplay Entertainment, and Double Fine Productions. Desura sold many games that were previously included in Humble Bundle initiatives, as well as numerous other commercial titles. Desura also provided several freeware and free software games.

Originally, the platform was developed by DesuraNET; it was later sold to Linden Lab, and then to Bad Juju Games, which filed for bankruptcy in June 2015. In October 2016, Desura was acquired by Danish company OnePlay, a subscription-based online rental service intended to relaunch Desura. OnePlay's plan to relaunch Desura failed and Desura's website spent four years being down. Since 2020, it is unrelated to the original Desura service, being a browser game website.

== Features ==
The Desura client was tied to its website through the use of the Chromium Embedded Framework. Most of its services were provided through its online interface, with the exception of the game launcher, installer, and update features. This means that the Desura interface remained consistent across multiple platforms.

The interface itself offered various selections based on what feature a user may want to access, with installed games being offered through the "Play" tab, games available for download or purchase being offered through the "Games" tab, user interaction and social networking features from the "Community" tab, information and features for game developers through the "Development" tab, and technical support and client settings through the "Support" tab.

Desura did not implement digital rights management, and Desura employees have commented against its use in the past, recommending that content creators ship without DRM or use a CD Key system instead. However, Desura itself was DRM-neutral, and publishers and developers could sell games that require such technologies to be used. Desura made sure users purchasing these titles are aware of the DRM it ships with and how it works.

=== Competitors ===
Desura competed in the same market as Valve's Steam platform. However, Scott Reismanis, the founder of DesuraNET, did not consider it a competitor, but rather an attempt to address a different segment of the market.

Desura primarily hosted indie games, which are games by smaller developers who do not have enough popularity or power to negotiate deals with Steam. Desura believed that its tighter links to a dedicated community would foster better relationships between players and developers.

Desura used to be tied to the Mod DB community, as both were run by the same company. Desura therefore highlighted content distribution for mods as one of its features.

== History ==
Desura was initially developed in secret by DesuraNET for many years. The project was first publicly announced on December 16, 2009. Near its launch, it publicized itself by offering free keys for games to augment the purchases of the same games made through Humble Indie Bundle #2. The Desura Windows client was released to the public on December 18, 2010. On July 10, 2013, Desura was bought by Linden Lab.

=== Linux support ===
Development on a Linux client was announced during the Summer of 2011, utilizing wxWidgets and GTK+ as the toolkit, and was introduced as a limited beta program in the Fall. The client was publicly available for download and execution, but users could not log into the online service unless they were a selected beta tester. On November 16, 2011, the Desura Linux client was publicly released with an initial offering of over 65 games.

Although Desura was not the only game distribution platform available for Linux, pre-dated by several traditional online sellers such as Tux Games, Fun 4 Tux, and Wupra, rival online store Gameolith, as well as many Linux distributions distributing games through their package management systems, Desura was the first and most prominent purely digital Linux game distributor with a dedicated client delivery application. The Ubuntu Software Center began selling commercial software packages just prior to the Linux Desura client release, but was not specialized for games, offering a substantially smaller catalog.

=== Source release ===
On November 9, 2011, it was announced that Desura would be made partially free software in order to facilitate its further development. The client itself would be released under the GNU General Public License, while the server-side portion of the distribution platform would remain proprietary. The media assets and trademarks would also remain property of DesuraNET. The free software release and development was handled in a manner similar to Google's Chromium project. The free project, named "Desurium", was publicly made available on January 21, 2012.

=== Ownership changes ===
On July 10, 2013, Linden Lab announced that they had acquired Desura. The service would continue uninterrupted for current customers and the team and technology become a part of Linden Lab. After acquiring Desura, Linden Lab changed their Terms of Service to include the wording that they have future rights to use and adapt content from their virtual citizens.

It was announced on November 5, 2014, that Linden Lab had sold the Desura service to Bad Juju Games. It faced backlash by indie developers for not paying for sales or keeping developers in the loop onto the situation. Bad Juju later filed for bankruptcy in June 2015. The Desura service went offline on March 19, 2016, but came back on March 29. Desura went offline again in September 2016, and has remained disconnected since then.

On October 28, 2016, the desura.com home page showed the following message: "OnePlay has recently bought the Desura and Royale assets from Bad Juju. We are working hard behind the scenes to relaunch your favorite indie gaming platform." The change in ownership news is dated October 21, 2016. An apparent effort was also made to give access back to the user accounts and libraries, but without any success to this day.

In the summer of 2020, Desura changed its owner again, the site was bought at an auction by the Finnish company Behemouse, one of whose activities is the development of HTML5 (formerly Flash) web games and promotion of other websites related.
