= Nine Parchments =

2017 video game

- Developer: Frozenbyte
- Publisher: Frozenbyte
- Director: Lauri Hyvärinen
- Producers: Timo-Pekka Kemppaine; Antti Rantanen
- Designer: Lauri Hyvärinen
- Programmer: Jussi Ernsten
- Artist: Charlotta Tiuri
- Writers: Maija Koivula; Silja Partanen
- Composers: Ari Pulkkinen; Antti Martikainen; Sauli Lehtinen; Jori Kemppi
- Platforms: Nintendo Switch; Windows; PlayStation 4; Xbox One
- Release: Nintendo Switch, Windows: WW: December 5, 2017; PlayStation 4: NA: December 12, 2017; EU: December 13, 2017; Xbox One: WW: March 7, 2018
- Genre: Action role-playing
- Modes: Single-player, multiplayer

Nine Parchments is a twin stick action role-playing game developed and published by Frozenbyte. The game was released for Nintendo Switch, Windows, and PlayStation 4 in 2017, and for Xbox One in 2018. The game's story revolves around students of the Astral Academy searching for the missing nine parchments.

== Gameplay ==
Four players fighting against the first boss in the game

Nine Parchments is a co-op action role-playing game utilizing twin stick controlled combat played in a 3D environment from an overhead view. The game can be played in single-player or with up to four players in local or online cooperative play. The game has two modes: adventure and arena. In adventure, players go through 32 levels, defeating waves of enemies and bosses along the way. Arena was added in a later update and has players survive more difficult enemy waves in small areas.

The game includes eight playable characters, with a ninth added in a free update. Each character has three different starting spells with different elements, and new spells are learned by collecting the missing parchments. As characters progress, they level up to unlock points to spend on their skill trees. Three additional variations with different color schemes and starting spells can be unlocked for each character through achievements. Equippable hats and staves can be obtained from quills and chests or by defeating certain enemies.

== Plot ==
Cornelius Crownsteed, a student of Astral Academy, and his friends Marvek the Torrid, Carabel the Glacial, Rudolfus the Strange, The Mechanical Owl, and Nim the Cleaner are reprimanded by Professor Butternut for their yet another failure in latest wizarding test when an explosion causes nine stored parchments each containing a powerful spell within to be blown away by the wind. In the ensuing chaos, Cornelius and his friends take this as the opportunity to sneak out and recover missing parchments, even if it means traveling around different corners of the world. Throughout their adventures, they also confront various flores and faunas mutated by magic emerging from portals seemingly to deter them.

The explosion at the academy is soon revealed to be masterminded by Anastasia the Lich, Astral Academy's former student who was expelled for conducting a dangerous arcane experiment leading to the very ongoing magical pollution which mutated flora and fauna Cornelius and co. encountered. By the time the students returned in hopes of their secured spell parchments to be stored in their spellbook via. Ritual of Sealing, Astral Academy is already overrun by Anastasia's minions. Fighting their way through their ruined school, Cornelius and co. finally confront Anastasia herself and defeat her in a difficult battle. Although dismayed by Professor Butternut's decision to reclaim the parchments for safekeeping and that they still have much to learn in the end, Cornelius and co. nonetheless admit their adventure to be a worthwhile one.

== Reception ==
Reception

Aggregate score
Aggregator	Score
Metacritic	NS: 66/100; PS4: 67/100; XONE: 71/100

Review scores
Publication	Score
Destructoid	6/10
Nintendo Life	7/10

Nine Parchments received "mixed or average" reviews from professional critics according to review aggregator website Metacritic.
