= Frozenbyte =

Finnish video game developer

Frozenbyte, Inc.
- Native name: Frozenbyte Oy
- Type: Limited company (osakeyhtiö)
- Industry: Video games
- Founded: 2001; 25 years ago
- Headquarters: Helsinki, Finland
- Products: Shadowgrounds series; Trine series
- Number of employees: ~80 (2025)
- Website: www.frozenbyte.com

Frozenbyte, Inc. (natively Frozenbyte Oy) is a Finnish video game developer founded in 2001 and based in Helsinki. As of October 2025, it had approximately 80 employees.

The Trine series has been Frozenbyte's flagship franchise and has sold over 15 million copies worldwide as of 2022, with releases across PC and multiple console platforms.

== History ==
Frozenbyte was founded in Helsinki in 2001 by Lauri Hyvärinen and Juha Hiekkamäki, originally operating as a small collective of hobbyist developers with little prior industry experience.

Frozenbyte's first commercial game, launched in 2005, was Shadowgrounds for Microsoft Windows. Both Shadowgrounds and its follow-up Shadowgrounds: Survivor were released for Linux in 2009, ported by IGIOS and published by Linux Game Publishing. They and all their later games use an engine that has been known internally as Storm3D, originally by Finnish programmer Sebastian Aaltonen.

Frozenbyte's next commercial game, Trine was released for Microsoft Windows in 2009, and has since been ported to Linux, OS X, the PlayStation Network, and Nintendo eShop. The game spawned four sequels, Trine 2 which was released on Microsoft Windows, OS X, PlayStation 3, and Xbox 360 in December 2011, Linux in March 2012, and Wii U eShop in November 2012, and Trine 3: The Artifacts of Power which was released via Steam Early access in August 2015. A fourth installment, Trine 4: The Nightmare Prince was released in October 2019. The fifth installment Trine 5: A Clockwork Conspiracy was released in 2023.

A Humble Indie Bundle sale started on 12 April 2011, and featured five games from Frozenbyte, including Trine, Shadowgrounds, and Shadowgrounds: Survivor, for Microsoft Windows, Mac OS X, and Linux. It also contained an executable version along with source code for an unfinished game, Jack Claw, and a pre-order for their upcoming game, Splot. As of August 2021, Splot has still to be published, and buyer's libraries on Humble Bundle say "There are no full release builds planned of Splot for Windows, Mac, and Linux".

On 4 December 2015, the company announced Shadwen, a stealth game where time moves only when the player moves.

On 28 May 2019, the company announced a new upcoming game Starbase, a sci-fi MMO that was allegedly in development in secret for five years prior.

== Games developed ==
- Shadowgrounds (2005)
- Shadowgrounds: Survivor (2007)
- Trine (2009)
- Trine 2 (2011)
- Splot (2014)
- Trine 3: The Artifacts of Power (2015)
- Shadwen (2016)
- Has-Been Heroes (2017)
- Nine Parchments (2017)
- Trine 4: The Nightmare Prince (2019)
- Starbase (2021)
- Trine 5: A Clockwork Conspiracy (2023)
- Trine 6: Together in Time (2027)
