= Numeric substitution in Japanese =

Type of phonetic matching

In Japanese, numeric substitution is a common form of goroawase (語呂合わせ, phonetic matching) by which numbers are substituted for homophonous words and phrases. Numeric substitution may be done as wordplay, but it is also used to produce abbreviations and mnemonic devices for memorizing information, such as telephone numbers and years in the study of history.

== Readings ==
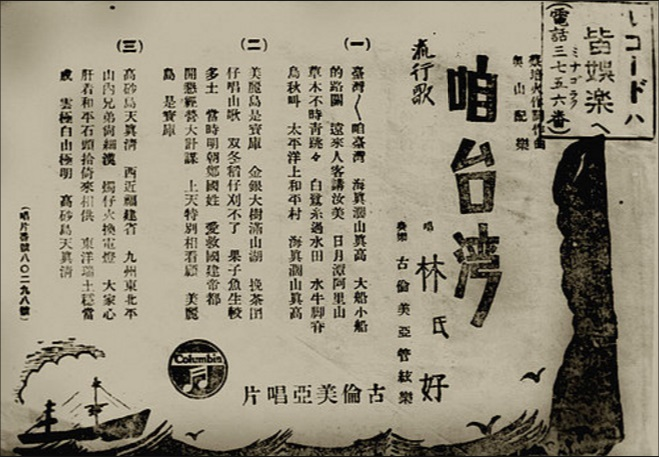
A liner note from Japanese Taiwan with a mnenomic for a telephone number

In Japanese, each digit/number has at least one native Japanese (kun'yomi), Sino-Japanese (on'yomi), and English-origin reading. Furthermore, variants of readings may be produced through abbreviation (i.e. rendering ichi as i), consonant voicing and devoicing (i.e sa as za or go as ko; see Dakuten and handakuten), gemination (i.e. roku as rokku; see sokuon), vowel lengthening (i.e. ni as nii; see chōonpu), reading multiple digits (most commonly 10) as a single number, or the insertion or deletion of the nasal mora n (ん).

#	Kun'yomi	On'yomi	English	Derivative
0	ma, maru, wa	re, rei	o, ze, zero	u, e, ō, mu, no, nashi, ra, wo
1	hi, hito, hitotsu	i, ichi, itsu	wa, wan	a, hi, bi, pi, fi, kazu
2	fu, futa, futatsu	ni, ji	tsū, tū	bu, pu, tsu, zu, nu, ne, ju, nyu
3	mi, mittsu	sa, san	surī	su, ta, da, so, zo, za, zan, myu
4	yo, yon, yottsu	shi	fō	ho, bo, po, ji
5	itsu, itsutsu	ko, go	faibu, faivu	ka, ke, ga, ge
6	mu, mutsu	ro, roku	shikkusu	me, mo, ra, ri, ru, ryu, ryū
7	na, nana, nanatsu	chi, shichi	se, ze, sebun, sevun	te, de, yu
8	ya, yatsu	ha, hachi, ba, pa	e, ei, eito	he, be, pe
9	ko, kokonotsu	ku, gu, kyu, kyū	nain	ki, gi, chu, chū
10	to, do, tō, dō	ji, jū	te, ten (Note: The reading ten is more commonly achieved by reading the decimal point as ten (点), meaning "point".)	de, den

Numeric substitutions may contain multiple types of readings and variations; for example, 0348, read as "o-su-shi-ya" (お寿司屋, sushi restaurant) uses abbreviated English readings for zero and three, an on'yomi reading for four, and ends with a kun'yomi reading for eight.

== Examples ==
- 11 can be read as "wan-wan", which is commonly used in Japan as an onomatopoeia for a dog barking.
- 16 can be read as "hi-ro", Hiro being a common Japanese given name, as well as sounding like the English word "hero".
- 26 can be read as "fu-ro" (風呂), meaning "bath". Public baths in Japan have reduced entry fees on the 26th day of every month.
- 29 can be read as "ni-ku" (肉), meaning "meat". Restaurants and grocery stores have special offers on the 29th day of every month.
- 39 can be read as "san-kyū", referring to "thank you" in English.
  - It can also be read as the common girls' name "Miku", as seen in Hatsune Miku example, below.
- 44 can be read as "yo-yo" and is thus a common slang term in the international competitive yo-yo community, which has a strong Japanese presence.
- 56, read as "ko-ro", is used in 56す, an alternate spelling of the verb "korosu" (殺す, to kill) used as algospeak on the internet to avoid wordfilters.
- 89 can be read as "ha-gu", which refers to "hug" in English. August 9 is National Hug Day in Japan.
- 109 can be read as "tō-kyū". The 109 department store in Shibuya, Tokyo is often read as "ichi-maru-kyū", but the number 109 was selected as the alternative reading "tō-kyū" is a reference to Tokyu Corporation, the group that owns the building.
- 428 can be read as "shi-bu-ya", referring to the Shibuya area of Tokyo, and "yo-tsu-ba" (四つ葉) meaning four-leaf clover.
- 526 can be read as "ko-ji-ro" in reference to Sasaki Kojiro, a samurai from the Edo period.
- 634 can be read as "mu-sa-shi". The Tokyo Skytree's height was intentionally set at 634 meters so it would sound like Musashi Province, an old name for the area in which the building stands.
- 801 can be read as "ya-o-i" or yaoi, a genre of homoerotic manga typically aimed at women.
- 893 can be read as "ya-ku-za" (やくざ) or "yakuza". It is traditionally a bad omen for a student to receive this candidate number for an exam.
- 4649 can be read as "yo-ro-shi-ku" (よろしく), meaning "best regards".

=== Mnemonics ===
- 1492, the year of Columbus' first voyage to America, can be read as "i-yo-ku-ni" and appended with "ga mieta" to form the phrase "Alright! I can see land!" (いいよ！国が見えた！). Additionally, "i-yo-ku-ni" itself could simply be interpreted as "It's a good country" (いいよ、国). The alternative reading "i-shi-ku-ni" is also used to memorize the year, though it is not typically associated with a particular meaning.
- 23564, the length of a sidereal day (23 hours, 56 minutes, 4 seconds), can be read as "ni-san-go-ro-shi", which sounds similar to "nii-san koroshi" (兄さん殺し) or in English, "killing one's older brother".
- 3.14159265, the first nine digits of pi, can be read as "san-i-shi-i-ko-ku-ni-mu-kou" (産医師異国に向こう), meaning "an obstetrician faces towards a foreign country".
- 42.195, the length of a marathon course in kilometres, can be read as "shi-ni-i-ku-go" (死に行く go), meaning "go to die, go".

=== Popular culture examples ===
==== Anime, manga, and television ====
- 01 can be read as "rei-wan", similar to the era name of the Reiwa era. Its English pronunciation was used for Kamen Rider Zero-One, the first Kamen Rider series of the Reiwa era.
- 123 can be read as "hi-fu-mi", which the name of Hifumi Izanami in the music anime HYPNOSISMIC -D.R.B.-, as well as Hifumi Suu - a character from The 100 Girlfriends Who Really, Really, Really, Really, Really Love You who is heavily associated and in love with numbers - is derived from.
  - Furthermore, her birthday is on 1/23, and Chapter 123 was her introductory chapter.
- 152 can be read as "hi-ko-ni", meaning "unofficial" (非公認, hikōnin), and is part of the license plate number of the Machine itasha in Unofficial Sentai Akibaranger.
- 18782 + 18782 = 37564 can be read as "i-ya-na-ya-tsu + i-ya-na-ya-tsu = mi-na-go-ro-shi" (嫌な奴＋嫌な奴＝皆殺し; bad person + bad person = massacre).
  - In Initial D, Rin Hojo's R32 Nissan Skyline GT-R has the license plate number "37-564", befitting his nickname of "Shinigami".
  - In Taiko no Tatsujin, a rhythm game, there is a song called 万戈イム一一ノ十 (成仏2000, Joubutsu 2000) where the lyrics "trois sept cinq six quatre" (3-7-5-6-4 in French) is sung multiple times.
- 25 can be read as "ni-ko", referring to the character Nico Yazawa from Love Live! School Idol Project, who wears a wristband with that number. Her brother, Cotaro Yazawa, also wears a shirt with that number.
  - 25252 can be read as "ni-ko-ni-ko-ni", referring to Nico's catchphrase "Nico Nico Ni".
- 29 can be read as "ni-ka", which is the name of a sun god in One Piece, and it represents the power of the protagonist
- 315, or "sa-i-go", is used as a transformation code in Kamen Rider 555: Paradise Lost due to being pronounced similarly to "Psyga".
- 428, read as "yo-tsu-ba", can refer to the character Yotsuba Nakano from The Quintessential Quintuplets, who wears T-shirts with that number.
- 4696 can be read as "yo-ru-ku-ra", which refers to the anime series "Jellyfish Can't Swim in the Night".
- 4869 can be read as "shi-ya-ro-ku" (しやろく); when "ya" is written small, it becomes "sharoku" (しゃろく), which resembles "Sherlock" (シャーロック, Shārokku). This number is Conan Edogawa's phone PIN and the name of an experimental drug in Case Closed.
- 5, read as "go", can refer to the board game go. In both the manga Hikaru no Go and its anime adaptation, the go-playing protagonist Hikaru Shindo often wears T-shirts with the number 5 on the front.
- 5106 can be read as "go-ji-ra", which is the Japanese name of Godzilla.
- 551 can be read as "go-ka-i", which is the name of the 35th season of Super Sentai, Kaizoku Sentai Gokaiger, as well, the code for the Gokai Galleon is 5501, which is similar to 551.
- 56 can be read as "go-mu", meaning "rubber" (ゴム, gomu), referring to One Piece protagonist Monkey D. Luffy's elastic abilities.
- 564 can be read as "go-ru-shi", which can be interpreted as ゴルシ (Golshi), Gold Ship's nickname from Umamusume: Pretty Derby.
- 5710 can be read as "ko-na-ta" referring to the character Konata Izumi from the manga and anime Lucky Star.
- 59 can be read as "go-ku" and is sometimes used in reference to Goku from Dragon Ball.
- 63 can be read as "mu-zan" or "miserable", which refers to Muzan Kibutsuji, the main antagonist of Demon Slayer. The official Demon Slayer Twitter account refers to June 3 as "Muzan Day".
- 723 can be read as "na-tsu-mi" or Natsumi and is commonly used in Sgt. Frog to symbolically refer to the character Natsumi Hinata.
  - July 23 (7/23) is the birthday of Date A Live character Natsumi Kyouno.
- 819 can be read as "ha-i-kyū" (排球), meaning volleyball. The community around the anime series Haikyu!! considers 19 August (8/19) to be "Haikyu!! Day".
- 861 can be read as "ha-ru-hi", referring to the character Haruhi Suzumiya as well as the franchise of the same name.
- 86239 can be read as "hachi-roku-ni-san-kyū", used in Initial D as the license plate number of a Toyota 86. It translates to "thank you, Eight-Six".
- 874 can be read as "ha-na-yo", in reference to the character Hanayo Koizumi from the Love Live! series.
- 89 years can be read as "ya-ku-sai". This is homophonous with the Japanese word for "calamity" (厄災 yakusai), being a fitting age for the JoJolion character Satoru Akefu, who has a calamity related ability.
- 894 can be read as "ba-ku-shi", which can be interpreted as バクシン (Bakushin), referring to the character Sakura Bakushin O from Umamusume: Pretty Derby.
- 913 can be read as "ka-i-sa", as in Kamen Rider Kaixa, hence it being the transformation activation code.
  - An anagram of this is 193, read as "i-ku-sa" (as in Kamen Rider IXA), which serves as the code to activate Rising Mode.
- 19 can be read as "i-ku", which is both literally and colloquially equivalent to "coming".
  - 1919 can be read as "i-ku-i-ku", which is a common exclamation during intercourse, but most commonly is used in reference to Manatsu no Yo no Inmu.
- 114514 can be read as "i-i-yo-ko-i-yo" in referencing popular catch-phrase from Manatsu no Yo no Inmu. It translates to "sure, come on" or "sure, come here".
  - 810 can be read as "ya-jū", referencing the actor Yaju Senpai from Manatsu no Yo no Inmu.

==== Music ====
- 10969 can be read as "wan-ō-ku-ro-ku", used by the rock band One Ok Rock.
- 32, read as "sa-tsu", is used in the name of Vocaloid producer 32ki (also spelled Satsuki), known for his song "Mesmerizer", including in social media handles and the name of his YouTube channel. Similarly but unrelatedly, 23, read as "tsu-mi", is at times used in the name of fellow producer Tsumiki (23ki).
- 345 can be read as "mi-yo-ko", used by Miyoko Nakamura, the bass player of the rock band Ling Tosite Sigure.
- 373, read as "mi-na-mi", is used by Minami on her logo and social handles.
- 39 can be read as "mi-ku", usually in reference to the Vocaloid character Hatsune Miku. Miku Kobato of Band-Maid uses it too, and her signature Zemaitis guitar has a truss rod cover with the numbers 5810 and 39, which mean "Kobato" and "Miku" respectively.
- 569 can be read as the English "Go Rock", used by 569 (album) by the band GO!GO!7188
- 524-773 can be read as "ko-ni-shi na-na-mi" and is part of the self-introduction of Hinatazaka46 member Nanami Konishi.
- 610 can be read as "ro-ten" or "rotten", and is often used on merchandise of the rock band ROTTENGRAFFTY.
- 712 can be read as "na-i-fu" (i.e. knife), and is used in the Shonen Knife album 712.
- 75, read as "na-ko", is used by Nako Yabuki in her Instagram and Twitter handles.
- 910 can be read as kyū-tō", used by the Jpop group C-ute. On June 29, 2013, the group received an official certification from the Japan Anniversary Council making September 10 (9/10), known as "°C-uteの日" ("°C-ute no Hi"; "°C-ute's Day"), a national day.
- 96 can be read as "ku-ro" meaning "black". 96猫 (ku-ro-neko, black cat) is a popular Japanese singer who covers songs on Niconico, and provides the singing voice of Tsukimi Eiko in Ya Boy Kongming!.

==== Video games ====
- 014029 can be read as "o-i-shii o-ni-ku" (美味しいお肉), meaning "delicious meat". In the Japanese version of Paper Mario: The Thousand-Year Door, "おいしー おにく" is used as a mnemonic for this number, which is a passcode that is required to progress in the game.
- 1121 can be read as "i-i-bu-i" (イーブイ), the Japanese pronunciation for the Pokémon Eevee; in 2018, 11/21 became known as "Eevee Day" (イーブイの日) in Japan.
- 193, when read as "i-ku-san" and interpreted to mean "Iku-san", can refer to Touhou Project character Iku Nagae, or IJN submarine I-19 in Kantai Collection.
- 2424 can be read as Puyo Puyo. This numerical correspondence has been used and referenced ever since the series' debut, and has also been used in various teasers for some of the games. The series celebrated its 24th anniversary in 2015.
- 283 can be read as "tsu-ba-sa" (翼), meaning "wing". This is used for the name of the 283 Production agency in THE iDOLM@STER: Shiny Colors.
- 315 can be read as "sa-i-kō" (最高), meaning "highest", "supreme", or "ultimate". This is used as the name for 315 Production in The Idolmaster SideM, where the idols under the label use "saikō" as a rallying chant.
- 34 is a frequent target of goroawase in the mystery franchise When They Cry, often being the name of a key figure in the central mystery, such as Miyo (三四) and Mitsuyo in Higurashi When They Cry, Sayo (紗代) in Umineko When They Cry, and Vier Dreissig (German for "four thirty") in Ciconia When They Cry.
- 346 can be read as "mi-shi-ro", meaning "beautiful castle". This is used for the name of 346 Production in THE iDOLM@STER: Cinderella Girls.
- 51 can be read as "go-ichi". These two numbers are the latter part of "SUDA51", the alias of Goichi Suda.
- 573 can be read as "ko-na-mi" and is often used by Konami; for example, it is used in Konami telephone numbers and as a high score in Konami games, as well as in promotional materials, sometimes as a character name, as the Codec frequency of Para-Medic (145.73) in Metal Gear Solid 3: Snake Eater and Metal Gear Solid: Portable Ops, and for the Konami code in mobile games replacing the lettered buttons.
- .59 can be read as "ten-go-ku" (天国), meaning "heaven" (an example being the song ".59" in Beatmania IIDX 2nd Style and Dance Dance Revolution 4thMix).
- 616 can be read as "ro-i-ro", referring to lowiro, the developer and publisher of the rhythm game Arcaea.
- 765 can be read as "na-mu-ko" or Namco. Derivatives of this number can be found in dozens of Namco-produced video games. For example, it is Pac-Man's house number in Pac-Man World. It was also the central studio of The Idolmaster and its sequels.
  - After merging with Bandai, their goroawase number became 876 (ba-na-mu); the handle of Bandai Namco Games' Japanese Twitter account is "@bnei876".
- 86 can be read as "ha-ru" or HAL. HAL Laboratory often puts this number somewhere in the video games it creates as parts of secrets and easter eggs, most notably in the Kirby series.
- In Pokémon Sword and Shield, all Gym Leaders and some extra characters have a three-digit jersey number that relates to their name, role, or typing they specialize in. For example, Opal has the jersey number 910, which can be read as "kyu-to" or cute, relating to her specialization in Fairy-type Pokémon.
- 74 can be read as "na-na-shi" (名無し), meaning "nameless" or "untitled". Deltarune contains an easter egg where Kris plays a piano in its fourth chapter; the first song is internally labelled as "kris_piano_sevenfour", referencing both how it's a 7/4 time signature song and has no name.

=== Other ===
- 15 can be read as "ichi-go" and is commonly used to refer to strawberries ("ichigo"). Equipping the front end of a Nissan Silvia S15 onto another S-chassis car is sometimes referred to as "strawberry face" conversion in English.
- 23 can be read as "ni-san". Car manufacturer Nissan frequently enters cars with the number 23 into motorsports events.
- 69 can be read as "ro-ki", as in Hi69 ("Hiroki"), one of the ring names of professional wrestler Hiroki Tanabe.
- 230 can be read as "fu-mi-o", the given name of former Japanese prime minister Fumio Kishida. He uses this number in his X (formerly Twitter) handle "kishida230".
- 262 can be read as "ji-mu-ni", referring to the Suzuki Jimny sports utility vehicle.
- 326 can be read as "Mitsuru" in the company name 326POWER, referring to the owner of the company "Haruguchi Mitsuru".
- 386 can be read as "su-ba-ru". Japanese automaker Subaru uses 386 in its parts numbers.
- 510, read as "go-tō", is used by professional wrestler Hirooki Goto in his Twitter handle.
- 563 can be read as "ko-ro-san" (ころさん); amounts of 563 yen are commonly donated to virtual YouTuber Inugami Korone of Hololive Production, who is sometimes referred to as "Koro-san".
  - Hololive founder Motoaki "YAGOO" Tanigo's nickname is occasionally represented with the number 85 ("ya-go") or 850 ("ya-go-ō").
- 622 can be read as "ra-bu-bu" (ラブブ), which could refer to the popular plushie Labubu.
- 726 can be read as "na-tsu-ru", as the ring name of professional wrestler 726.
- 870 can be read as "ha-na-wa", which could refer to either Hanawa, Fukushima, or a garland.
- 2434 can be read as "ni-ji-san-ji", which refers to the virtual YouTuber agency Nijisanji. Some Japanese members of the company use this number in their Twitter handles.
- 2525 can be read as "ni-ko-ni-ko" (ニコニコ) and refers to Niconico, a Japanese online video platform. Its "mylists", which function similarly to lists of bookmarks (or YouTube playlists), are limited to 25 per user.

== See also ==
- Gematria
