= List of Higurashi When They Cry novels =

The cover to Nekogoroshi-hen

The novels in the Higurashi When They Cry series are written by Ryukishi07, and are based on the visual novel series of the same name by 07th Expansion. There are four light novels which contain additional illustrations by five different artists, and seventeen novelizations of the separate visual novel arcs.

The light novels were all released as limited editions not sold in stores. The first one, Nekogoroshi-hen, was illustrated by Karin Suzuragi, Yutori Hōjō, and Jirō Suzuki, and was sent out to those who bought the first volume of the manga versions of Onikakushi-hen, Watanagashi-hen, and Tatarigoroshi-hen. One needed to send the cut out stamps in all three of these manga by the deadline in order to receive this special short story. The second light novel, Kuradashi-hen, was illustrated by Tonogai Yoshiki, Karin Suzuki, Yutori Hōjō, and Mimori. This novel was sent out to those who bought the second volume of the manga version of Himatsubushi-hen, and the first volumes of the manga Tsumihoroboshi-hen, Meakashi-hen, and Yoigoshi-hen. One needed to send the cut out stamps in all four of these manga by a certain deadline in order to receive this special short story. The third light novel, Hajisarashi-hen, contained illustrations by Rato, and was included with the limited edition of the PlayStation 2 game Higurashi no Naku Koro ni Matsuri. The fourth novel, Kuradashi-hen Zoku is a sequel to Kuradashi-hen and was sent out to those who bought the second volumes of the manga Tsumihoroboshi-hen, Meakashi-hen, and Yoigoshi-hen. One needed to send the cut out stamps in all four of these manga by a certain deadline in order to receive this special short story. The light novels were published by Square Enix and released in 2006 and 2007.

Kodansha Box released seventeen novelizations of the visual novel arcs between August 2007 and March 2009, starting with Onikakushi-hen and ending with Higurashi no Naku Koro ni Rei. Most of the story arcs are divided into two volumes, except for Himatsubushi-hen and Higurashi no Naku Koro ni Rei which are compiled into one volume each, and Matsuribayashi-hen which is compiled into three volumes. The novels included illustrations by Tomohi.

== Volume list ==
=== Light novels ===
No.	Title	Release date	ISBN
01	Higurashi no Naku Koro ni Gaiden Nekogoroshi-hen (ひぐらしのなく頃に外伝 猫殺し編)	2006	—
The storyline of Nekogoroshi-hen is divided into two parts. The first half consists of average club activities, with the usual members playing poker with embarrassing penalties. In the second half, the club members decide to head to the abandoned Yagouchi Quarry on the outskirts of Hinamizawa. Mion tells the tale of how one of her childhood friends, called Friend A, went missing while playing hide-and-seek near the area. Friend A was found by his father, but they were found dead in their car on the way home when they went off a cliff. It was rumored that they fell victim to the poisonous gases that leaked from the "hole", which supposedly leads to hell.
02	Higurashi no Naku Koro ni Kuradashi-hen (ひぐらしのなく頃に 蔵出し編)	2007	—
This novel is a compilation of the ideas and stories that Ryukishi07 could not incorporate into the games.
03	Higurashi no Naku Koro ni Matsuri Hajisarashi-hen (ひぐらしのなく頃に祭 羞晒し編)	2007	—
04	Higurashi no Naku Koro ni Kuradashi-hen Zoku (ひぐらしのなく頃に 蔵出し編・続)	2007	—

=== Novelizations ===
No.	Title	Release date	ISBN
01	Higurashi no Naku Koro ni Dai 1 Wa: Onikakushi-hen (1) (ひぐらしのなく頃に 第1話～鬼隠し編～（上）)	August 2007	978-4-0628-3637-1
02	Higurashi no Naku Koro ni Dai 1 Wa: Onikakushi-hen (2) (ひぐらしのなく頃に 第1話～鬼隠し編～（下）)	September 2007	978-4-0628-3641-8
03	Higurashi no Naku Koro ni Dai 2 Wa: Watanagashi-hen (1) (ひぐらしのなく頃に 第2話～綿流し編～（上）)	October 2007	978-4-0628-3646-3
04	Higurashi no Naku Koro ni Dai 2 Wa: Watanagashi-hen (2) (ひぐらしのなく頃に 第2話～綿流し編～（下）)	November 2007	978-4-0628-3649-4
05	Higurashi no Naku Koro ni Dai 3 Wa: Tatarigoroshi-hen (1) (ひぐらしのなく頃に 第3話～祟殺し編～（上）)	December 2007	978-4-0628-3653-1
06	Higurashi no Naku Koro ni Dai 3 Wa: Tatarigoroshi-hen (2) (ひぐらしのなく頃に 第3話～祟殺し編～（下）)	January 2008	978-4-0628-3655-5
07	Higurashi no Naku Koro ni Dai 4 Wa: Himatsubushi-hen (ひぐらしのなく頃に 第4話～暇潰し編～)	February 2008	978-4-0628-3657-9
08	Higurashi no Naku Koro ni Kai Dai 1 Wa: Meakashi-hen (1) (ひぐらしのなく頃に解 第1話～目明し編～（上）)	May 2008	978-4-0628-3664-7
09	Higurashi no Naku Koro ni Kai Dai 1 Wa: Meakashi-hen (2) (ひぐらしのなく頃に解 第1話～目明し編～（下）)	June 2008	978-4-0628-3665-4
10	Higurashi no Naku Koro ni Kai Dai 2 Wa: Tsumihoroboshi-hen (1) (ひぐらしのなく頃に解 第2話～罪滅し編～（上）)	July 2008	978-4-0628-3669-2
11	Higurashi no Naku Koro ni Kai Dai 2 Wa: Tsumihoroboshi-hen (2) (ひぐらしのなく頃に解 第2話～罪滅し編～（下）)	August 2008	978-4-0628-3670-8
12	Higurashi no Naku Koro ni Kai Dai 3 Wa: Minagoroshi-hen (1) (ひぐらしのなく頃に解 第3話～皆殺し編～（上）)	September 2008	978-4-0628-3677-7
13	Higurashi no Naku Koro ni Kai Dai 3 Wa: Minagoroshi-hen (2) (ひぐらしのなく頃に解 第3話～皆殺し編～（下）)	October 2008	978-4-0628-3680-7
14	Higurashi no Naku Koro ni Kai Dai 4 Wa: Matsuribayashi-hen (1) (ひぐらしのなく頃に解 第四話～祭囃し編～（上）)	November 2008	978-4-0628-3688-3
15	Higurashi no Naku Koro ni Kai Dai 4 Wa: Matsuribayashi-hen (2) (ひぐらしのなく頃に解 第四話～祭囃し編～（中）)	December 2008	978-4-0628-3689-0
16	Higurashi no Naku Koro ni Kai Dai 4 Wa: Matsuribayashi-hen (3) (ひぐらしのなく頃に解 第四話～祭囃し編～（下）)	January 2009	978-4-0628-3697-5
17	Higurashi no Naku Koro ni Rei: Saikoroshi-hen (ひぐらしのなく頃に礼 ～賽殺し編～)	March 2009	978-4-0628-3704-0
