= Gensō Rōgoku no Kaleidoscope =

- Original PlayStation 4 cover featuring (clockwise from the left) Karin Tamaru, Doremi Hanabusa, Fūka Gojō and Mina Yuasa
- Developer: 07th Expansion
- Publisher: Entergram
- Artist: Itaru Hinoue
- Writer: Ryukishi07
- Composer: HiguUmiSound
- Platforms: PlayStation 4, Nintendo Switch, PlayStation Vita
- Release: JP: December 17, 2020
- Genres: Visual novel, Psychological horror
- Mode: Single-player

Gensō Rōgoku no Kaleidoscope (Japanese: 幻想牢獄のカレイドスコープ, Hepburn: Gensō Rōgoku no Kareidosukōpu; lit. Kaleidoscope of Phantasm Prison), officially abbreviated as Gerokasu (ゲロカス; lit. Trash), is a Japanese psychological horror visual novel developed by 07th Expansion and published by Entergram. The release date of this game on the PlayStation 4, Nintendo Switch, and PlayStation Vita platforms was on December 17, 2020. The game was originally planned to release on November 28, 2019. The story revolves around four highschoolers—Fūka Gojō, Karin Tamaru, Mina Yuasa, and Doremi Hanabusa—who are kidnapped and forced to take part in a death game. Ryukishi07 wrote the story, while character designs were drawn by Itaru Hinoue.

A sequel was released on March 14, 2025, for PlayStation 4 and Nintendo Switch.

== Plot ==
Four friends who attend high school together as second-year students are kidnapped. Steel collars are placed around their necks, with chains attached to a torture chair in each corner of the room. A large cage dangles from the ceiling, in which a silent young boy dressed in all white is trapped. As the girls try to escape, a voice tells them that they are being put through a test with only two possible outcomes: either everyone will die, or one girl will die and the other three will survive. In addition, everyone will die if they exceed a five-minute time limit. The boy in the cage gives out four Cards of Fate to the girls, which will decide how the story unravels. There are two Judgement cards, a Pierrot card, and a Prisoner card. During the death game, an incident buried in the girls' past emerges.

== Characters ==
Fūuka Gojō (五条 風華, Gojō Fūuka)
Voiced by: Himika Akaneya
Karin Tamaru (田丸 火凛, Tamaru Karin)
Voiced by: Minori Suzuki
Mina Yuasa (湯浅 水無, Yuasa Mina)
Voiced by: Moe Toyota
Doremi Hanabusa (英 土麗美, Hanabusa Doremi)
Voiced by: Asami Seto
Sora Motoki (元基 空役, Motoki Sora)
Voiced by: Fūka Haruna

Sora is the only male best friend among the four girls and is Fūuka's love interest. His parents work as Travel Entertainers which leads to him being in the high school for 3 months.

== Development and release ==
Gerokasu was first announced as a project titled Sangeki Sandbox (惨劇サンドボックス, Sangeki Sandobokkusu; lit. Tragedy Sandbox) in March 2018. Entergram officially announced the game on August 8, 2019, the same day that the official website opened. The game has been described by Entergram as a "girls mental suspense" game. The scenario was written by Ryukishi07, 07th Expansion's leading member. Former Key artist Itaru Hinoue is the game's artist and character designer. Hinoue and Ryukishi07 both worked together on Key's 2011 visual novel Rewrite. Super deformed (SD) art was drawn by Hisashi Senomoto. The music of the game was composed by HiguUmiSound, a group known for their work on 07th Expansion's past works Higurashi and Umineko.

The game was released on the PlayStation 4, Nintendo Switch and PlayStation Vita. The game was planned to be released on November 28, 2019, but its release was postponed indefinitely due to a production-related issue. The game was then announced to release on December 17, 2020. The limited edition releases come bundled with a setting guidebook, a drama CD, the Cards of Fate set, and an acrylic art panel featuring Fūka and Kū-chan. The setting guidebook, titled Official Setting Material Collection "Phantasm Object" (公式設定資料集「Phantasm Object」, Kōshiki Settei Shiryōshū "Phantasm Obujekuto"), contains character designs, commentary from the cast and staff, and the drama CD script. The drama CD, titled Voice Drama CD "Locked Room Desk Quiz Tournament" (ボイスドラマCD「密室デスクイズ大会」, Boisu Dorama CD "Misshitsu Desukuizu Taikai"), is an original story where Fūka, Karin, Mina and Doremi are forced to compete in a quiz.

== Music ==
The first opening theme is "Beautiful World" by Emi Uema and the grand opening theme is "I'm a Great Pretender" by Naomi Tamura.
