= List of Umineko When They Cry novels =

The novels in the Umineko When They Cry series are written by Ryukishi07, and are based on the visual novel series of the same name by 07th Expansion. Kodansha Box started releasing novelizations of the visual novel arcs in July 2009 with Legend of the Golden Witch. Each arc is divided into two volumes, except for the last arc which is a single volume, illustrated by Tomohi. There are fifteen volumes in total.

== Volume list ==
No.	Title	Release date	ISBN
01	Umineko no Naku Koro ni Episode 1 Legend of the Golden Witch (1) (うみねこのなく頃に Episode 1 Legend of the Golden Witch （上）)	July 1, 2009	978-4-06-283719-4
02	Umineko no Naku Koro ni Episode 1 Legend of the Golden Witch (2) (うみねこのなく頃に Episode 1 Legend of the Golden Witch （下）)	August 4, 2009	978-4-06-283721-7
03	Umineko no Naku Koro ni Episode 2 Turn of the Golden Witch (1) (うみねこのなく頃に Episode 2 Turn of the Golden Witch （上）)	November 5, 2009	978-4-06-283730-9
04	Umineko no Naku Koro ni Episode 2 Turn of the Golden Witch (2) (うみねこのなく頃に Episode 2 Turn of the Golden Witch （下）)	December 1, 2009	978-4-06-283735-4
05	Umineko no Naku Koro ni Episode 3 Banquet of the Golden Witch (1) (うみねこのなく頃に Episode 3 Banquet of the Golden Witch （上）)	March 2, 2010	978-4-06-283744-6
06	Umineko no Naku Koro ni Episode 3 Banquet of the Golden Witch (2) (うみねこのなく頃に Episode 3 Banquet of the Golden Witch （下）)	April 3, 2010	978-4-06-283745-3
07	Umineko no Naku Koro ni Episode 4 Alliance of the Golden Witch (1) (うみねこのなく頃に Episode 4 Alliance of the Golden Witch （上）)	July 2, 2010	978-4-06-283753-8
08	Umineko no Naku Koro ni Episode 4 Alliance of the Golden Witch (2) (うみねこのなく頃に Episode 4 Alliance of the Golden Witch （下）)	August 3, 2010	978-4-06-283754-5
09	Umineko no Naku Koro ni Chiru Episode 5 End of the Golden Witch (1) (うみねこのなく頃に散 Episode 5 End of the Golden Witch （上）)	July 13, 2012	978-4-06-283757-6
10	Umineko no Naku Koro ni Chiru Episode 5 End of the Golden Witch (2) (うみねこのなく頃に散 Episode 5 End of the Golden Witch （下）)	December 18, 2012	978-4-06-283811-5
11	Umineko no Naku Koro ni Chiru Episode 6 Dawn of the Golden Witch (1) (うみねこのなく頃に散 Episode 6 Dawn of the Golden Witch （上）)	March 4, 2014	978-4-06-283840-5
12	Umineko no Naku Koro ni Chiru Episode 6 Dawn of the Golden Witch (2) (うみねこのなく頃に散 Episode 6 Dawn of the Golden Witch （下）)	June 3, 2014	978-4-06-283844-3
13	Umineko no Naku Koro ni Chiru Episode 7 Requiem of the Golden Witch (1) (うみねこのなく頃に散 Episode 7 Requiem of the Golden Witch （上）)	June 3, 2015	978-4-06-283885-6
14	Umineko no Naku Koro ni Chiru Episode 7 Requiem of the Golden Witch (2) (うみねこのなく頃に散 Episode 7 Requiem of the Golden Witch （下）)	September 2, 2018	978-4-06-283901-3
15	Umineko no Naku Koro ni Chiru Episode 8 Twilight of the Golden Witch (うみねこのなく頃に散 Episode 8 Twilight of the Golden Witch)	September 30, 2018	978-4-06-512931-9
