= Higanbana =

Higanbana may refer to:

- Lycoris radiata, a plant in the amaryllis family Amaryllidaceae, also known as a red spider lily

== Media ==
- Equinox Flower (originally titled Higanbana), a 1958 Japanese film
- Higanbana (album), a 2007 studio album by Merzbow
- Higanbana no Saku Yoru ni, a manga and visual novel series
