= Higanbana no Saku Yoru ni =

Japanese manga series and video game

- Cover of volume 1 of Higanbana no Saku Yoru ni, published by Fujimi Shobo, showing Higanbana

彼岸花の咲く夜に
- Genre: Horror
- Manga
- Written by: Ryukishi07
- Illustrated by: Ichirō Tsunohazu
- Published by: Fujimi Shobo
- Magazine: Monthly Dragon Age
- Original run: May 2010 – November 2012
- Volumes: 6
- Video game
- Developer: 07th Expansion
- Publisher: 07th Expansion; FuRyu (3DS)
- Genre: Visual novel
- Platform: Microsoft Windows; Nintendo 3DS
- Released: Dai-ichi Yoru: JP: August 13, 2011; JP: July 27, 2016 (3DS); Dai-ni Yoru: JP: December 31, 2011

Higanbana no Saku Yoru ni (彼岸花の咲く夜に; lit. "On the Night the Red Spider Lily Blooms"), subtitled The Unforgiving Flowers Blossom in the Dead of Night, is a Japanese manga written by Ryukishi07 of 07th Expansion and illustrated by Ichirō Tsunohazu. It was serialized between the May 2010 and November 2012 issues of Fujimi Shobo's Monthly Dragon Age magazine. 07th Expansion adapted the manga into a dōjin visual novel series, with the first game released on August 13, 2011, at Comiket 80 and the second on December 31, 2011, at Comiket 81.

== Plot ==
Higanbana no Saku Yoru ni takes place in an unnamed school setting and is composed of numerous self-contained short stories, each told from the perspective of a student or staff member from the school. These stories feature bullying as a major overlying theme, as each story's protagonist is depicted as being either a victim of bullying or a bully themselves. Higanbana revolves around a series of urban legends caused by supernatural beings called yōkai, each of which claims ownership of a particular "mystery" and kills anyone who tries to investigate it. There are a total of seven "mysteries" at the start of the series, with numerous yōkai fighting each other in an ongoing turf war for ownership of these mysteries, which is granted to the seven yōkai who emerge victorious in the conflict. The stories' protagonists interact with at least one of the school's resident yōkai, who force the protagonists to deal with the consequences of their actions regarding bullying.

=== Main characters ===
Marie Moriya (森谷 毬枝, Moriya Marie)
Marie is the main protagonist of the first short story, titled Mesomeso-san. She is introduced as a student who is constantly bullied by her classmates and molested by her homeroom teacher at an abandoned school building neighboring her school. While despairing over her predicament in the public toilet of the building, she becomes the subject of an eighth urban legend involving a yōkai named Mesomeso (derived from the Japanese onomatopoeia for weeping and sobbing) that haunts the toilet. The school's yōkai offer her the chance to become a yōkai in order to fill the new rank in their hierarchy, which she does after being strangled to death by her teacher. As Mesomeso, she appears before the series's other protagonists to support them if they are victims of bullying, or to confront them if they themselves are bullies.
Higanbana (彼岸花)
Higanbana is the third-highest ranking yōkai in the school, also known as the "Dancing Higanbana". She is a very beautiful girl who takes the form of a Western doll that sits in the school infirmary and, according to her associated legend, dances on its own at night. She is the yōkai who directly offers Marie to become Mesomeso, and treats her as her personal assistant. She regularly torments cruel or weak-willed students, and is depicted as either an antagonist if she targets a story's hero, or as an antihero if she targets a villain.

== Background ==
Higanbana no Saku Yoru ni's origin dates back to 2006 when Ryukishi07 started writing a serial light novel titled Gakkō Yōkai Kikō: Dai-hachi Kaidan Boshūchū (学校妖怪紀行 第八怪談募集中, lit. School Yōkai Travelogue: Recruiting the Eighth Kaidan), with illustrations by Nishieda. The novel first appeared in the third volume of Fujimi Shobo's Dragon Age Pure magazine on November 29, 2006. Two more chapters were serialized in Dragon Age Pure before it was discontinued: chapter two in volume four sold on April 20, 2007, and chapter three in volume five sold on June 20, 2007. The novel was adapted into a manga illustrated by Rei Izumi titled Gakkō Yōkai Kikō: Yō (学校妖怪紀行 ～枼～). A short preview of the manga appeared in the fifth volume of Dragon Age Pure, and was discontinued after the first chapter appeared in the sixth volume of Dragon Age Pure on August 20, 2007.

== Media ==
=== Printed media ===
Higanbana no Saku Yoru ni began as a manga written by Ryukishi07 of 07th Expansion and illustrated by Ichirō Tsunohazu. The character designs were originally designed by Nishieda. The manga was serialized between the May 2010 and November 2012 issues of Fujimi Shobo's Monthly Dragon Age magazine. Six tankōbon volumes were released between November 9, 2010, and February 9, 2013. A light novel written by Ryukishi07 with illustrations by Tsuitachi Sakuya titled Higanbana no Saku Yoru ni was published by Fujimi Shobo on December 20, 2011.

=== Visual novels ===
07th Expansion produced two dōjin visual novels based on the manga. The first game, titled Higanbana no Saku Yoru ni: Dai-ichi Yoru (彼岸花の咲く夜に 第一夜; lit. On the Night the Red Spider Lily Blooms: First Night), was released on August 13, 2011, at Comiket 80. The second game, subtitled Dai-ni Yoru (第二夜; lit. Second Night), was released on December 31, 2011, at Comiket 81. Unlike 07th Expansion's previous game series Higurashi no Naku Koro ni and Umineko no Naku Koro ni, both Higanbana games contain seven novellas and are about the same length as an Umineko game. The games were also distributed by MangaGamer since February 7, 2014, for explicit use of the English translation patch, but following the end of the deal between MangaGamer and 07th Expansion, they have ceased to sell the games.

The port of the first visual novel to the Nintendo 3DS was released by FuRyu on July 27, 2016, alongside The House in Fata Morgana and World End Economica: Episode 1 as a digital-only title.
