= When They Cry =

Japanese media franchise

When They Cry is a Japanese media franchise consisting of visual novel games and adaptations thereof, and may refer to:

- Higurashi When They Cry
- Umineko When They Cry
- Ciconia When They Cry
