= En Kitō =

Japanese manga artist and illustrator

En Kitō (鬼頭 えん, Kitō En; born June 30) is a Japanese manga artist and illustrator. While working as a dōjin artist, she was in charge of the key drawings for the adult game Heart de Network (Euphony Production) in 2000. After releasing several one-shots in commercial magazines, she began serializing two manga (written by Ryukishi07) based on the Higurashi When They Cry visual novel series, Onisarashi-hen and Utsutsukowashi-hen, in Comp Ace (Kadokawa Shoten) from 2005 to 2007. In the July 2008 issue of Comp Ace, she started work on a manga based on Valkyria Chronicles, and completed the series in the May 2010 issue. She is a big fan of the Breath of Fire (Capcom) series of role-playing games, and her dōjin activities mainly revolve around it. Since the summer of 2010, she has been publishing her original dōjin work, the Saint Foire Festival series.
