= Rose Guns Days =

Video game series

- The cover of Season 1, the first Rose Guns Days game released

ローズガンズデイズ (Rōzu Ganzu Deizu)
- Genre: Action, alternate history
- Video game
- Developer: 07th Expansion
- Publisher: 07th Expansion
- Genre: Dōjin soft, Visual novel
- Platform: Windows, iOS, Android
- Released: Season 1: JP: August 11, 2012; WW: April 9, 2026; Season 2: JP: December 31, 2012; WW: July 30, 2026; Season 3: JP: August 10, 2013; Last Season: JP: December 31, 2013; The Best: JP: August 31, 2016
- Manga
- Written by: Ryukishi07
- Illustrated by: Sōichirō, Nana Natsunishi, Yō Ōmura, Mitsunori Zaki
- Published by: Square Enix
- English publisher: NA: Yen Press
- Magazine: Gangan Joker, GFantasy, Gangan Online, Big Gangan
- Original run: September 2012 – June 25, 2015
- Volumes: 12
- Manga

Rose Guns Days Aishū no Cross Knife
- Written by: Ryukishi07
- Illustrated by: Yūji Takagi
- Published by: Square Enix
- Magazine: Big Gangan
- Original run: December 25, 2012 – October 25, 2013
- Volumes: 2
- Manga

Rose Guns Days Fukushū wa Ōgon no Kaori
- Written by: Ryukishi07
- Illustrated by: Mei Renjōji
- Published by: Kodansha
- Magazine: Monthly Shōnen Sirius
- Original run: April 26, 2013 – April 26, 2014
- Volumes: 2

Rose Guns Days (ローズガンズデイズ, Rōzu Ganzu Deizu) is a four-part Japanese dōjin visual novel series produced by 07th Expansion and playable on Windows PCs. The first game in the series, Season 1, was released on August 11, 2012, and the fourth game, Last Season, was released on December 31, 2013. There have been six manga adaptations based on Rose Guns Days published by Kodansha and Square Enix.

== Gameplay ==
Average dialogue and narrative in Rose Guns Days, depicting the main character Leo talking to Rose

As a visual novel, the gameplay in Rose Guns Days is generally spent on reading the story's narrative and dialogue. The text is accompanied by character sprites over background art made from altering real-world photographs. Throughout gameplay, the player encounters a quick time event minigame of a fist fight battle sequence that resembles a fighting game. The outcome of these minigames does not influence the progression of the story, and the player even has the option to skip them. The minigame has two parts: attack and defense. After the player successfully attacks three times, the player can then perform an overkill attack whose power is determined by the choice of one of six cards. How well the player performs in the minigames determines the total score and emblems awarded, and as the score increases, so does the player's rank, which increases the difficulty of the minigames.

== Plot ==
Rose Guns Days takes place in an alternate history where a natural disaster during World War II causes Japan to surrender earlier than it did in the real world, leading to a contested occupation of Japan by both China and the United States. The game depicts the growing conflict between a rising mafia family and occupation forces in post-war Japan.

== Development and release ==
Rose Guns Days is 07th Expansion's fourth visual novel series. The scenario is written entirely by Ryukishi07, who also provides some of the character designs, which are divided between three additional artists: Jirō Suzuki, Sōichirō and Yaeko Ninagawa. The music of Rose Guns Days is provided by various music artists including both professionals and dōjin artists including: Dai, Luck Ganriki, Rokugen Alice, M. Zakky and Pre-holder. The first game in the series, titled Season 1, was released on August 11, 2012 at Comiket 82 and is playable on Windows PCs. Season 2 was released on December 31, 2012 at Comiket 83. Season 3 was released on August 10, 2013, at Comiket 84. The fourth and final game in the series, Last Season, was released on December 31, 2013, at Comiket 85. A version of Season 1 playable on iOS devices was released on November 9, 2012, followed by a version playable on Android devices released on December 13, 2012. All four seasons were also distributed by MangaGamer between February 7, 2014, and April 25, 2015, for explicit use with the English translation patch. MangaGamer rereleased Season 1 on Steam as well as their website with Japanese, English, and Chinese Text on April 9, 2026.

== Related media ==
=== Manga ===
A manga adaptation of Rose Guns Days Season 1, illustrated by Sōichirō, was serialized between the September 2012 and March 2014 issues of Square Enix's Gangan Joker magazine. Four tankōbon volumes for Season 1 were released between December 22, 2012, and April 22, 2014. A manga adaptation of Rose Guns Days Season 2, illustrated by Nana Natsunishi, was serialized between the February 2013 and April 2014 issues of Square Enix's GFantasy magazine. Three volumes for Season 2 were released between August 22, 2013, and April 22, 2014. A manga adaptation of Rose Guns Days Season 3, illustrated by Yō Ōmura, began serialization in Square Enix's Gangan Online magazine on September 19, 2013. The first volume for Season 3 was released on April 22, 2014. A manga adaptation of Rose Guns Days Last Season, illustrated by Mitsunori Zaki, began serialization in the May 2014 issue of Square Enix's Big Gangan magazine. Yen Press licensed the manga for release in North America.

A spin-off manga, titled Rose Guns Days Aishū no Cross Knife (Rose Guns Days 哀愁のクロスナイフ) and illustrated by Yūji Takagi, was serialized in Big Gangan between December 25, 2012, and October 25, 2013. Two volumes for Aishū no Cross Knife were released between August 22 and December 21, 2013. A prologue manga, titled Rose Guns Days Fukushū wa Ōgon no Kaori (Rose Guns Days 復讐は黄金の香り) and illustrated by Mei Renjōji, was serialized between the June 2013 and June 2014 issues of Kodansha's Monthly Shōnen Sirius magazine. The first volume of Fukushū wa Ōgon no Kaori was released on November 8, 2013 and the second and last on July 9, 2014.

=== Music ===
The opening theme to Rose Guns Days is "Ai wa Omerta" (愛はオメルタ) by Rojak feat. Mayumi. A soundtrack titled Rose Guns Days Sound Tracks 1 was released on August 11, 2012, and a soundtrack titled Rose Guns Days Sound Tracks 2 was released on December 30, 2012.
