= Jirō Suzuki =

Japanese manga artist

Jirō Suzuki (鈴木 次郎, Suzuki Jirō; born February 14) is a Japanese manga artist. She is the writer and illustrator of the manga MAGiMAGi, and has provided illustrations for the manga adaptations of the Tatarigoroshi-hen chapter in Higurashi When They Cry and the Turn of the Golden Witch chapter in Umineko When They Cry. She is also one of the character designers for the 07th Expansion game Rose Guns Days, designing several characters including the main character Leo Shishigami.
