= Ciconia When They Cry =

Japanese visual novel series

- Promotional art featuring Mitake Miyao
- Developer: 07th Expansion
- Publishers: JP: 07th Expansion; WW: MangaGamer
- Producer: Nakao Bōshi
- Artists: Ryukishi07; Remotaro
- Writer: Ryukishi07
- Composers: Dai; Luck Ganriki; Xaki; Gin Kreuz; Pre-holder; Uni Akiyama
- Platforms: Microsoft Windows, macOS
- Release: October 4, 2019 (Phase 1); TBA (Phase 2–4)
- Genre: Visual novel
- Mode: Single-player

Ciconia When They Cry (Note: Known in Japan as Ciconia no Naku Koro ni (Japanese: キコニアのなく頃に, Hepburn: Kikonia no Naku Koro ni; "When the Ciconia Cry")) is an episodic visual novel game series in development by 07th Expansion, collectively considered the fifth entry in the When They Cry series, following Higurashi When They Cry and Umineko When They Cry. (Note: Higurashi and Umineko each have two sets of four episodes, and each set is considered a separate entry in the series.) It follows people trying to prevent the outbreak of World War IV. It is released episodically for Microsoft Windows and macOS, by 07th Expansion in Japan and by MangaGamer internationally, and is planned to be four episodes long. The first, "Phase 1: For You, the Replaceable Ones", was released in October 2019; the second was planned for release in 2020, but delayed due to the COVID-19 pandemic. In 2023, the second phase was suspended indefinitely because the author did not want to create a story glorifying war.

The series is written by Ryukishi07 and produced by Nakao Bōshi, and features art by Ryukishi07 and Remotaro, and music by several returning series composers. It was designed to be different from Higurashi and Umineko, with a larger world compared to their isolated settings, and with the intent that the player can choose to just enjoy the story or optionally try to solve the mysteries themselves, a change influenced by the 1995 anime series Neon Genesis Evangelion. The story's set-up was also designed to be more condensed, with episode 1 roughly corresponding to the first half of Umineko in terms of plot progression.

== Overview ==
Ciconia When They Cry is a visual novel set after the end of World War III. It follows Gauntlet Knights – young people trained to use a new military technology called the Gauntlet, which allows its user to fly, fight, and repel attacks – who have become friends and aim to prevent the outbreak of a fourth world war.

== Production ==
=== Development ===
Ciconia When They Cry is developed by 07th Expansion, with a scenario, original character designs and illustrations by Ryukishi07. The game is produced by Nakao Bōshi, and features graphics and coloring by Remotaro. The music is composed by returning When They Cry series staff, including Dai, Luck Ganriki, Xaki, and Uni Akiyama; and the opening theme is performed by Maria Sawada. The game is developed and released episodically, and is planned to be four episodes long. The game's title – "ciconia", a genus of birds in the stork family – comes from how the game focuses on child characters. While at a convention outside Japan, Ryukishi07 asked recurring 07th Expansion composer Gin Kreuz how to localize the title in Japanese to make it sound more appealing. Kreuz responded with "ciconia" as opposed to "chikonia". The latter, as Ryukishi07 claims, sounded similar to how a Japanese person would pronounce it. Convinced by how natural Kreuz's pronunciation sounded, Ryukishi07 opted for "ciconia", owing to its sound and how well he thought it fit the game's science fiction setting.

=== Writing ===
Production of the first episode began in November 2017, while Ryukishi07 was working on the audio drama Haworthia, which was used to test Ciconia's concepts. It was announced the following year in July 2018 with an illustration of its protagonist, under the working title "●● no Naku Koro ni" ("[Blank] When They Cry"), along with the expanded Umineko compilation Umineko no Naku Koro ni Saku, both of which were planned for release in Q4 2018. In October 2018, both were delayed until Q2/Q3 2019, due to inaccurate scheduling based on what Ryukishi07 had been physically capable of when he worked on Higurashi and Umineko about ten years prior, as well as due to the longer script compared to Higurashi and Umineko's first episodes. Ryukishi07 intended for Ciconia to stand out from previous When They Cry games, and wanted change up some elements that had been recurring up until that point: he had for example specifically intended for the player to actively try to figure out the mysteries in Higurashi and Umineko, but changed this for Ciconia to also let the player simply enjoy the story. This decision was influenced by the 1995 anime series Neon Genesis Evangelion, which both presents a straightforward narrative and hints at larger mysteries of its world. Another change was the scope of the game's setting: the series had featured increasingly smaller settings, going from Higurashi's isolated village to Umineko's small island cut off from the outside world, so Ryukishi07 decided to create a When They Cry game set in a large world. To show gratitude to international fans of the series, he also specifically wrote the script to feature characters from around the world.

Ciconia's story was condensed compared to those in Higurashi and Umineko: both of them were split into four "question arcs" and four "answer arcs", where their mysteries are set up and solved, with an initial episode mainly serving to introduce the characters and setting. Meanwhile, Ciconia was constructed to span four episodes, with its equivalents of the "question arcs" condensed to give more room for its "answer arcs", with Ryukishi07 describing the end of Ciconia's first episode as equivalent to Umineko's third or fourth episode in terms of plot progression. This was in part done due to time, as the series' release schedule had meant that it had taken two years for just Umineko's "answer arcs" to come out.

=== Music and visuals ===
The music tracks in the game were specifically composed to begin quickly, and give the listener a feeling for the song's mood within the first few seconds, as the developers wanted to avoid a situation where a scene ends before the player has gotten past a long prelude. As Ryukishi07 did not have the musical knowledge to describe what kind of music he wanted in the game, he would listen to a lot of music and send tracks that fit his vision to Dai, who would in turn write instructions based on those tracks for himself and the other composers. The game's character sprites were created in a collaboration between Ryukishi07 and Remotaro: Ryukishi07 would draw sketches of each sprite, and Remotaro would then draw the line art and paint the sprites. She would specifically try to preserve the style and charm of Ryukishi07's artwork, as she knew that there were fans of Higurashi and Umineko who were attached to Ryukishi's art, while still adding more details and trying to make the art shine with focus on texture, light and shadow.

== Release ==
At Sakura-Con 2019, Ryukishi07 and video game publisher MangaGamer announced that they would release the game simultaneously in English and Japanese, coinciding with Summer Comiket 2019 on August 9, 2019. In July 2019, however, 07th Expansion announced that the game had been delayed until late September 2019; it was then delayed again, with the first episode, "Phase 1: For You, the Replaceable Ones", released on October 4, 2019, for Microsoft Windows and macOS. In Japan, it additionally got a physical release. The second episode was initially planned to be released in May 2020, and then delayed until later in the year. In November 2020, Ryukishi07 announced that it had been delayed again due to the COVID-19 pandemic, which he considered too similar to the catastrophic events of the game for him to release Phase 2 at that time, describing it as a situation akin to if the monster Godzilla had attacked while the 1954 film was in production.

The English localization is handled by the translation group Witch Hunt, who previously worked on the English translation of Umineko. They are also working on a localization of Umineko no Naku Koro ni Saku, but are on Ryukishi07's request prioritizing Ciconia. The English language option was added to the Japanese physical release through a patch update in November 2019.

=== Episodes ===
No.	Title	Original release date
1	"Phase 1: For You, the Replaceable Ones"; Transliteration: "Phase 1: Kawari no Iru Kimitachi e" (Japanese: Phase1 代わりのいる君たちへ)	October 4, 2019
2	TBA	TBA
3	TBA	TBA
4	TBA	TBA

== Reception ==
The first episode of Ciconia was well received by players. Keiichi Yokoyama of Automaton was impressed with it, and said that its production values were noticeably improved compared to previous entries in the When They Cry series, he also described it as "for better or worse, a Ryukishi07 work".
