= Ryukishi07 =

Japanese writer

- Born: November 19, 1973 (age 52); Chiba Prefecture, Japan
- Occupations: Author and artist
- Writing career
- Period: 2001–present
- Genres: Fantasy, horror, mystery fiction and science fiction
- Notable works: Higurashi When They Cry; Umineko When They Cry; Rewrite; Silent Hill f

Ryukishi07 (竜騎士07, Ryūkishi Zero-Nana; born November 19, 1973; real name unknown) is the pen name of a Japanese writer who is the leading member of the group 07th Expansion. He is the creator of the When They Cry visual novel series, which includes Higurashi When They Cry, Umineko When They Cry, and Ciconia When They Cry. His pen name originated from Final Fantasy, "Ryūkishi" being the term for "Dragoon" and "07" a play on words for "Lenna". His other notable works include Silent Hill f (2025) and Rewrite (2011).

== Early life ==
Ryukishi07 studied at a vocational school that specializes in art and wrote doujinshi, while having interests in anime, manga and video games. While in college, he tried to write manga and novels, but realized, "No matter your passion for something, without skill, you can never make it as a professional." He met with a colleague from a theatre troupe and was inspired to write a play called Hinamizawa Bus Stop (雛見沢停留所, Hinamizawa Teiryūjo), which he submitted to a contest that he later lost. After graduating from school, he dreamed of becoming a video game developer. He focused on finding a job at a video game manufacturer, but he failed to do so. He took up a position at a menswear store, but after a few months, he tentatively took up an offer for a civil service position based on the civil service test that he had taken during the job search.

== Career ==
Ryukishi07 launched the doujin circle 07th Expansion in 2001. He originally produced original cards for Leaf Fight, a trading card game produced by the eroge developer Leaf. After his younger brother Yatazakura learned game programming and, inspired by the success of Type-Moon's visual novel Tsukihime, suggested that he and Ryukishi create their own sound novel, 07th Expansion began to produce Higurashi When They Cry, a reworking of concepts from Ryukishi's Hinamizawa Bus Stop script into a psychological horror visual novel, with characters inspired by the works of Key.

In a 2012 interview with Damien Bandrac for Journal du Japon, Ryukishi07 said:

Initially, my audience was otaku who attend Comiket, which are a very small fraction of Japanese otaku, themselves a small part of Japanese people in general! I never thought for one second that I could be read, published, edited at the other end of the planet, in France... As for Higurashi, I never thought that people outside Japan might be interested. Umineko in particular is a text that even Japanese people can have difficulty reading. So, to imagine that foreigners have made the effort to read it, understand it, and translate it, is an indescribable happiness to me.

His writing has been described as alternating between "macabre scenes and schoolboy humor". He has said, "A story should be like a roller coaster. That is to say before writing a really cruel scene, I have to lift the people's spirits, for example, with a fun scene... Before writing a scene of pure despair, we must go through scenes of hope. And indeed, when I write, all of this amuses me very much." He has cited And Then There Were None as an influence.

Konami enlisted him to write the video game Silent Hill f as they were seeking a writer who could "really understand the essence of Japanese horror".

== Works ==
- Higurashi When They Cry (scenario and illustrations, Kodansha Box novels)
- Kaidan to Odorō, Soshite Anata wa Kaidan de Odoru (怪談と踊ろう、そしてあなたは階段で踊る), novel, serialized in Faust
- Kaidan to Odorō, Soshite Anata wa Kaidan de Odoru (怪談と踊ろう、そしてあなたは階段で踊る), manga (story)
- Higurashi Daybreak (scenario)
- Umineko When They Cry (scenario and illustrations, Kodansha Box novels)
- Rewrite by Key (partial scenario)
- Ōkami Kakushi by Konami (original plan/director)
- Higanbana no Saku Yoru ni
- Natsu no Kagerō (なつのかげろう), a cancelled 3D game collaboration with Twilight Frontier
- Rose Guns Days (scenario and partial character design)
- Iwaihime (Scenario)
- Hotarubi no Tomoru Koro ni (Story)
- Trianthology: Sanmenkyō no Kuni no Alice (partial scenario and partial illustrations)
- Renai Harem Game Shuuryou no Oshirase ga Kuru Koro ni (scenario)
- Ciconia When They Cry (scenario)
- Bakemonotachi ga Usobuku Koro ni ~ Bakemonohime no Kateikyoushi (バケモノたちが嘯く頃に ～バケモノ姫の家庭教師～), novel
- Gensō Rōgoku no Kaleidoscope (scenario)
- Loopers by Key (scenario)
- Silent Hill ƒ by Konami (scenario)
