= 07th Expansion =

Japanese dōjin circle

- Industry: Sound novels video games
- Founded: 2000; 26 years ago
- Headquarters: Japan
- Products: Higurashi When They Cry; Umineko When They Cry; Higanbana no Saku Yoru ni Rose Guns Days; Ciconia When They Cry
- Website: 07th-expansion.net

07th Expansion is a Japanese dōjin circle — a group or collective that self-publishes fan-made or original creative works based on manga, anime, or other cultural works — that specializes in the creation of visual novels. The group began by creating works based on the trading card game Leaf Fight, and is now best known for creating the game series When They Cry.

== History ==
07th Expansion initially produced original cards for the trading card game Leaf Fight, selling them at events such as Comiket, where the circle met BT, who later managed their website.

After two years of selling cards, the group considered shifting to another medium. Around this time, the commercial success of Type-Moon's Tsukihime inspired doujin circles like 07th Expansion to create visual novels. Co-founder Yatazakura began learning the NScripter game engine, and together with Ryukishi07, the group adapted Hinamizawa Bus Stop—an unproduced stage play written by Ryukishi07—into their debut visual novel, Higurashi When They Cry.

== Members ==
- Ryukishi07: Founder of 07th Expansion. He began drawing manga in Junior High School to express his creativity. In high school, he started to notice the difference in artistic abilities with his peers, leading him to quit drawing manga. During this time, he became interested in doujin activities; however, due to not having his own circle, he would help out other doujin circles with coloring illustrations. He later studied at a vocational school.
- Yatazakura: Co-founder of 07th Expansion. Inspired by Tsukihime, he learned how to use NScripter which led to the creation of Higurashi When They Cry with Ryukishi07.
- BT: Homepage manager. Initially a customer while 07th Expansion was producing cards for Leaf Fight. Later died in 2009 from an illness.

== Mascot ==
Evolution of the design of 07th Expansion's mascot

Rena Ryukishi is the company mascot. At first, she wore something resembling armor before changing to a uniform in the style of Pia Carro. Her fourth outfit eventually became the uniform of Angel Mort, a fictional restaurant in Higurashi When They Cry. She was officially introduced in Higurashi When They Cry as one of the main characters under the name Rena Ryūgū.

== Works ==
=== Visual Novels ===
==== When They Cry ====
Higurashi

- Higurashi When They Cry
  - Ch.1 Onikakushi: August 10, 2002 (Comiket 62)
  - Ch.2 Watanagashi: December 29, 2002 (Comiket 63)
  - Ch.3 Tatarigoroshi: August 15, 2003 (Comiket 64)
  - Ch.4 Himatsubushi: August 13, 2004 (Comiket 66)
- Higurashi When They Cry Kai
  - Ch.5 Meakashi: December 30, 2004 (Comiket 67)
  - Ch.6 Tsumihoroboshi: August 14, 2005 (Comiket 68)
  - Ch.7 Minagoroshi: December 30, 2005 (Comiket 69)
  - Ch.8 Matsuribayashi: August 13, 2006 (Comiket 70)
- Higurashi When They Cry Rei (fan disc): December 31, 2006 (Comiket 71)
- Higurashi no Naku Koro ni Hō (fan disc): August 17, 2014 (Comiket 86)
- Higurashi no Naku Koro ni Hō + (fan disc): January 28, 2022

Umineko

- Umineko When They Cry
  - Episode 1: Legend of the Golden Witch: August 17, 2007 (Comiket 72)
  - Episode 2: Turn of the Golden Witch: December 31, 2007 (Comiket 73)
  - Episode 3: Banquet of the Golden Witch: August 16, 2008 (Comiket 74)
  - Episode 4: Alliance of the Golden Witch: December 29, 2008 (Comiket 75)
- Umineko When They Cry Chiru
  - Episode 5: End of the Golden Witch: August 15, 2009 (Comiket 76)
  - Episode 6: Dawn of the Golden Witch: December 30, 2009 (Comiket 77)
  - Episode 7: Requiem of the Golden Witch: August 14, 2010 (Comiket 78)
  - Episode 8: Twilight of the Golden Witch: December 31, 2010 (Comiket 79)
- Umineko no Naku Koro ni Tsubasa (fan disc): December 31, 2010 (Comiket 79)
- Umineko no Naku Koro ni Hane (fan disc): December 31, 2011 (Comiket 81)
- Umineko no Naku Koro ni Saku (fan disc): October 4, 2019

Ciconia

- Ciconia When They Cry
  - Phase 1: For You, the Replaceable Ones: October 4, 2019
  - Phase 2 : Delayed

==== Others ====
- Higanbana no Saku Yoru ni
  - Dai-ichi Ya: August 13, 2011 (Comiket 80)
  - Dai-ni Ya: December 31, 2011 (Comiket 81)
- Rose Guns Days
  - Season 1: August 11, 2012 (Comiket 82)
  - Season 2: December 31, 2012 (Comiket 83)
  - Season 3: August 10, 2013 (Comiket 84)
  - Last Season: December 31, 2013 (Comiket 85)
- Trianthology: Sanmenkyō no Kuni no Alice: August 31, 2016 (Comiket 90)

=== Fighting Games ===
- Umineko: Golden Fantasia: December 31, 2010 (Comiket 79)
  - Ōgon Musōkyoku Cross: December 31, 2011 (Comiket 81)

=== Card Games ===
- Leaf Fight
- Tagai o Otoko no Ko Maid ni Chōkyōshiau Game: November 18, 2012
