= Umineko When They Cry =

Japanese visual novel series

- Cover of Alliance of the Golden Witch, the fourth chapter released in the series

うみねこのなく頃に (Umineko no Naku Koro ni)
- Genre: Murder mystery
- Video game
- Developer: 07th Expansion
- Publisher: JP: 07th Expansion (Windows); JP: Taito (FOMA); JP: Alchemist (PS3, PSP); JP: Aibee (iOS); JP: Entergram (Switch, PS4); WW: MangaGamer
- Genre: Visual novel
- Platform: Microsoft Windows: FOMA (mobile) (Note: Episode 1 only) PlayStation 3 PlayStation Portable (Note: Episodes 1-4 only) iOS (Note: Episodes 1-2 only) macOS Linux Nintendo Switch PlayStation 4
- Released: JP: 2007–2019; WW: 2016–2017; Legend; JP: August 17, 2007; WW: July 8, 2016 Turn; JP: December 31, 2007; WW: July 8, 2016 Banquet; JP: August 16, 2008; WW: July 8, 2016 Alliance; JP: December 29, 2008; WW: July 8, 2016 End; JP: August 15, 2009; WW: November 17, 2017 Dawn; JP: December 30, 2009; WW: November 17, 2017 Requiem; JP: August 14, 2010; WW: November 17, 2017 Twilight; JP: December 31, 2010; WW: November 17, 2017 Tsubasa; JP: December 31, 2010 Hane; JP: December 31, 2011 Saku; JP: October 4, 2019
- Manga
- Written by: Ryukishi07
- Illustrated by: Kei Natsumi (EP 1, 3, 8): Jirō Suzuki (EP 2) Sōichirō (EP 4) Akitaka (EP 5) Hinase Momoyama (EP 6) Eita Mizuno (EP 7)
- Published by: Square Enix
- English publisher: NA: Yen Press
- Magazine: Monthly Shōnen Gangan: GFantasy Gangan Joker Gangan Online Gangan Powered
- Original run: December 22, 2007 – June 22, 2015
- Volumes: 53
- Manga

Umineko Biyori: Rokkenjima e Yōkoso!!
- Written by: 07th Expansion
- Illustrated by: Makoto Fugetsu
- Published by: Ichijinsha
- Magazine: Manga Palette Lite
- Original run: March 1, 2008 – March 2, 2009
- Volumes: 1
- Manga

Umineko no Naku Koro ni EpisodeX Rokkenjima of Higurashi crying
- Written by: 07th Expansion
- Illustrated by: Yuki Hiiro
- Published by: ASCII Media Works
- Magazine: Dengeki G's Festival! Comic
- Original run: January 26, 2009 – February 23, 2011
- Volumes: 2
- Novel series
- Written by: Ryukishi07
- Illustrated by: Tomohi
- Published by: Kodansha
- Imprint: Kodansha Box
- Original run: July 1, 2009 – September 30, 2018
- Volumes: 15
- Anime television series
- Directed by: Chiaki Kon
- Produced by: Mika Nomura; Hiroyuki Ōmori; Takema Okamura
- Written by: Toshifumi Kawase
- Studio: Studio Deen
- Licensed by: NA: NIS America
- Original network: UHF Stations
- Original run: July 2, 2009 – December 24, 2009
- Episodes: 26
- Other
- Golden Fantasia (fighting game)

Umineko When They Cry (Japanese: うみねこのなく頃に, Hepburn: Umineko no Naku Koro ni; lit. 'When the Seagulls Cry') is a Japanese dōjin soft visual novel series produced by 07th Expansion. Its first episode debuted at Comiket 72 for Windows in August 2007. The story focuses on a group of eighteen people on a secluded island for a period of two days, and the mysterious murders that befall them. Readers are challenged to discern whether the murders were committed by a human or some other, supernatural source, as well as the method and motive behind them. The eight main Umineko games are split into two sets of four, which are considered the third and fourth titles in the When They Cry series, preceded by the two sets of Higurashi When They Cry games and followed by Ciconia When They Cry.

The games—either in portions or in full—have been ported or remastered several times, including by Taito for select FOMA phones; by Alchemist for PlayStation 3, PlayStation Portable, and Xbox 360; by Oizumi for pachinko machines; by MangaGamer for Steam and GOG.com; and by Entergram for Nintendo Switch and PlayStation 4.

Square Enix, Ichijinsha, Kadokawa Shoten, and ASCII Media Works all published various manga adaptations of the series. It was adapted into an anime television series, which aired from July to December 2009. A series of novels written by Ryukishi07 are published by Kodansha Box. A fighting game based on the franchise, Umineko: Golden Fantasia, was released by 07th Expansion in December 2010. Since April 2022, Umineko has been adapted into an ongoing series of stage plays produced by Shingidan Mumei Classics, with the seventh episode to premiere in September 2026.

== Gameplay ==
Umineko When They Cry is a murder mystery visual novel, and as such conveys its story primarily through text-based narration and dialogue supplemented by visual and audio elements such as character sprites, background music, and sound effects. It is described as a "sound novel" by 07th Expansion, due to the game's greater focus on creating atmosphere through audio elements rather than visual aspects. The original releases contain no voice acting for the characters. Umineko is almost entirely linear and contains no interactive gameplay elements, with the exception of small portions of its final entry, Twilight of the Golden Witch. Besides advancing text, players may also access the Tips Mode, allowing them to read various supplementary information regarding the characters and story. Each episode also contains two epilogues which are successively unlocked, which are continuations of the main story that often contain important plot points.

Despite the lack of interactive gameplay elements, Umineko is framed as a game between the author and the reader, with difficulty ratings given in the descriptions for each episode. This refers to the difficulty of the mysteries in each episode, which the reader is intended to actively try to solve. Several story elements are introduced through the course of the story to aid readers in solving the mystery along with the story's protagonist.

== Synopsis ==
=== Plot ===
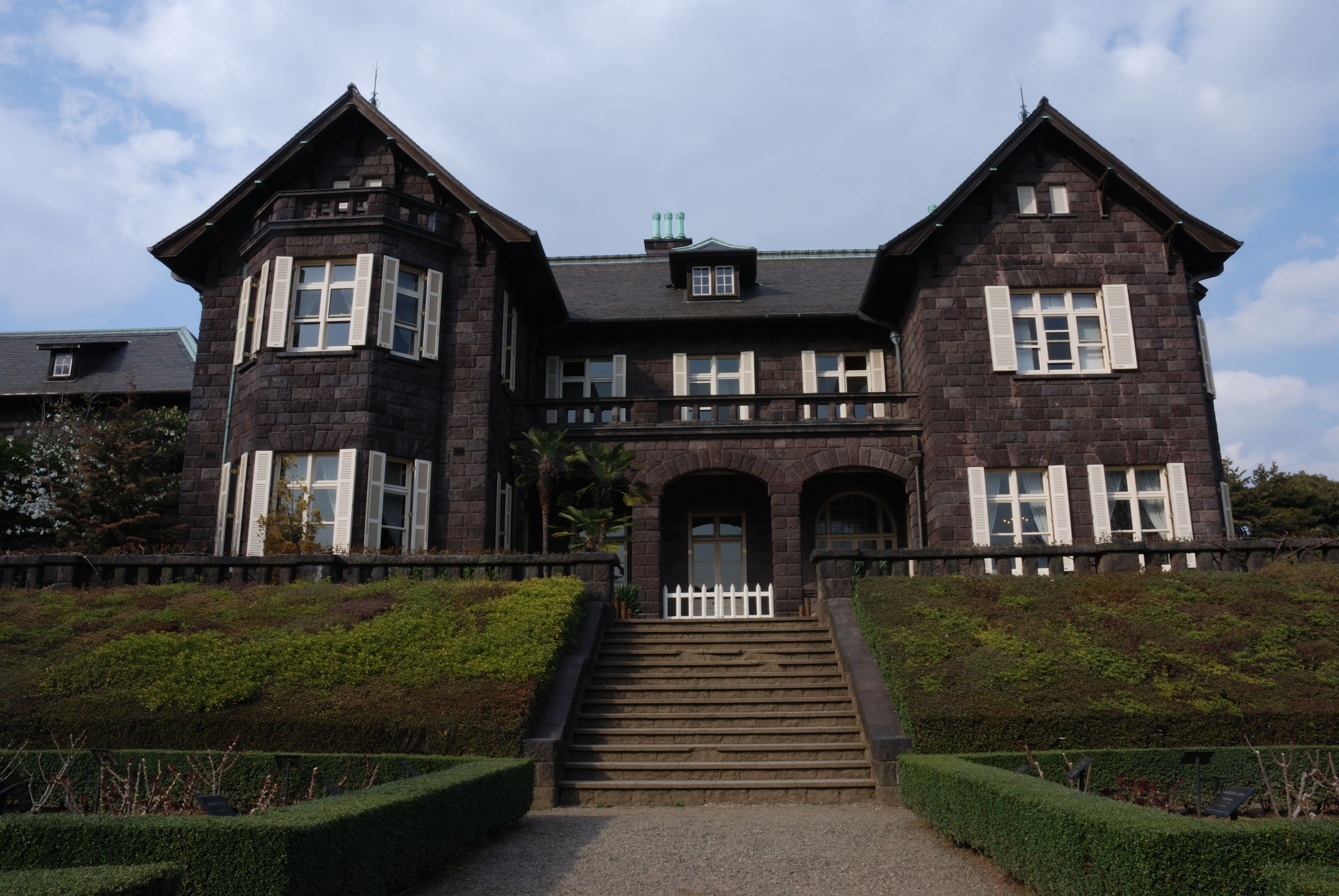
The mansion in Kyu-Furukawa Gardens in Kita, Tokyo, basis of the exterior of the guest house on Rokkenjima

The story begins on October 4, 1986, at Rokkenjima (六軒島), a private island where the wealthy Ushiromiya family have gathered to discuss the division of assets belonging to the ailing family head, Kinzo. Returning after a six-year absence, Kinzo's grandson Battler becomes reacquainted with the legend of the "Golden Witch" Beatrice, who supposedly gave Kinzo ten tons of gold to restore his financially crippled family in the past. Beside her portrait is a riddle-like epitaph, which is believed to grant the rumored gold and the succession of the headship to the solver. A typhoon traps the eighteen people on the island, and occult-like murders occur in accordance with the epitaph, often in ways that seem impossible for a human.

At the end of the first episode, the witch Beatrice seemingly kills everyone. In the credits it's revealed that story up this point was just a retelling of a message bottle found years after the massacre. Refusing to acknowledge the existence of magic, Battler is seemingly sent to the parallel dimension of Purgatorio, from which events on Rokkenjima can be seen as a "game board". There he meets Beatrice and faces her in the games of logic, tasked to explain murders with human tricks.

Subsequent episodes show events on Rokkenjima arranged in various different ways each time, while Battler discusses them with Beatrice and other magical entities in Purgatorio. Battler uses various logical weapons to oppose Beatrice, such as red text, in which only truth can be written, or blue text, which is considered true until refuted by red. The story also shows the real world 12 years later, where the only survivor is Eva Ushiromiya, Battler's aunt. Eva adopts Battler's sister, Ange, who did not attend the conference due to illness. Ange, who has a hateful relationship with Eva and is bullied by her classmates, refuses to accept the death of her family and tries to reach the truth on her own. Over the course of the story, Battler and Ange come to understand magic as an adornment of reality with fantasy, used by several individuals as a coping mechanism for their harsh life situations.

Battler is at first in conflict with Beatrice, despising her for the suffering inflicted upon the inhabitants of Rokkenjima throughout her games. As the story progresses, Beatrice suggests that the massacre on Rokkenjima was caused by a supposed "sin" of Battler's, which he does not recall. As a result of Battler's lack of recollection, Beatrice gives up on her games and enters a near-death state of apathy. With Beatrice no longer hosting games, other characters serve as Game Masters for the following episodes, beginning with the witch Lambdadelta in Episode 5. In this episode, the witch Bernkastel introduces a new character to the game board named Furudo Erika, a detective who seeks to solve the mystery of Rokkenjima. As this game progresses, Erika presents her supposed solution to the mystery, blaming the crimes on Natsuhi. Battler, believing in Natsuhi's innocence and unhappy with Erika's disregard for the feelings of others, opposes Erika. Upon being cornered by Erika's arguments, Battler comes to understand the truth of the Rokkenjima massacre, killing Beatrice. Knowing the truth allows Battler to defeat Erika's flawed solution, allowing him to ascend to the position of Sorcerer and Game Master.

As Game Master, Battler conducts the events of Episode 6 to prove to Lambdadelta and Bernkastel that he understands the truth of the mystery. However, the narrative he attempts to present throughout the episode is circumvented by Erika, forcing him into a "logic error," trapping his consciousness in a locked room until the error is solved or he accepts defeat. Meanwhile, a duel is conducted by Shannon and Kanon to determine which will be allowed to pursue their love, killing the other. Kanon is ultimately defeated, and through his sacrifice Battler's logic error is solved, freeing the latter. Beatrice is resurrected and joins Battler in defeating Erika.

In episode 7, Bernkastel summons detective Willard H. Wright to solve truth about Beatrice's identity. He deduces that she is Kinzo's illegitimate child, playing the roles of two servants, Shannon and Kanon. The child was born after Kinzo raped the secret daughter of his long-dead mistress. Kinzo handed the child to his eldest son's wife, Natsuhi, who had been unable to get pregnant. In an alternate world, Natsuhi accepts the child, resulting in them joining the family as Ushiromiya Lion. Willard and Lion are attacked by Bernkastel but manage to escape her clutches.

Episode 8 is another game hosted by Battler, this time as an attempt to convince Ange that understanding the full truth of the massacre is an unnecessary pursuit. However, Ange is convinced by Bernkastel to read the book containing the true events that happened on Rokkenjima, causing her to despair. The inhabitants of Rokkenjima save Ange and ultimately assist her in stopping the author Hachijo Tohya from publishing Eva's diary, supposedly containing the full truth, in the real world. In the future, Ange's suicide is prevented and she goes on to become an author. Ange meets Hachijo Tohya, who is revealed to be Battler, having survived the massacre but lost his memories, effectively being a different person. Ange takes Tohya to the orphanage she sponsors, carrying on the legacy of the magic taught to her by Maria.

=== Story arcs ===
==== Umineko no Naku Koro ni ====
Umineko no Naku Koro ni (うみねこのなく頃に; lit. When the Seagulls Cry) consists of the first four arcs of the series. They are referred to as the Question Arcs and introduce the world of the story and its mysteries. Each arc contains all the previous ones.

Episode 1: Legend of the Golden Witch (2007)
The chapter introduces the player to the main setting for the series as the Ushiromiya family gather on the island of Rokkenjima for their annual family conference. The player is familiarized with the island's 18 residents (consisting of the Ushiromiya family and servants) as well as the legend of the Golden Witch, Beatrice. As the story progresses, people on the island are murdered, and the family is taunted by letters that claim to be from the witch Beatrice, who takes responsibility for the murders and intends to take back everything of the Ushiromiya family.
Episode 2: Turn of the Golden Witch (2007)
The chapter introduces the "meta-world", where Battler is locked into a battle of twisted logic with the witch Beatrice as the murders on the island repeat in a different way. Beatrice also arrives on the island as its 19th resident, and fantastical elements are introduced into the story. The chapter also focuses on George and Jessica's relationships with the Ushiromiya family servants, Shannon and Kanon.
Episode 3: Banquet of the Golden Witch (2008)
The third chapter continues the repeating murders, with a special focus on Eva Ushiromiya, Kinzo's first daughter. Unlike the first two chapters, the adults of the Ushiromiya family make a serious attempt to solve the riddle of the epitaph. Eva succeeds in this task and finds the gold, but a witch persona of Eva continues to carry out the murders in Beatrice's name.
Episode 4: Alliance of the Golden Witch (2008)
The chapter introduces Battler's sister Ange as a secondary protagonist, who survived the Rokkenjima massacre due to being absent and was taken in by the only survivor of the incident, Eva. It has a shifting focus of events, showing readers Ange's life in the aftermath of the incident and exploring her relationship with Maria and magic through Maria's diary. The Ange of 1998 sets out on a journey to uncover the truth of Rokkenjima, while the events on the Beatrice's gameboard repeat for the fourth time.

==== Chiru ====
Umineko no Naku Koro ni Chiru (うみねこのなく頃に散; lit. When the Seagulls Cry Scattering) tells the second half of the story, delving deeper into the core of the mystery while providing more clues towards the truth of Rokkenjima. Each arc in this series contains all of the previous Chiru arcs.

Episode 5: End of the Golden Witch (2009)
This chapter introduces a new game master in the form of the witch Lambdadelta. Another witch, Bernkastel, takes primary control of the human side in the game. She introduces a new visitor to the island in the form of the detective Erika Furudo, who approaches the murders from a "mystery" perspective, unlike Battler who had taken an "anti-fantasy" stance. The chapter also has a focus on Natsuhi, who receives threatening phone calls from a "Man from 19 Years Ago".
Episode 6: Dawn of the Golden Witch (2009)
Having become the new game master, Battler Ushiromiya is tasked in this chapter with creating his gameboard as a way of demonstrating his understanding of Beatrice's game. Like Turn of the Golden Witch, Battler's game has a focus on the lovers, and also introduces a reborn Beatrice who struggles to discover the person she once was.
Episode 7: Requiem of the Golden Witch (2010)
This chapter presents an alternate reality where Battler does not come to Rokkenjima, the Golden Witch does not exist, and a mysterious child is now the designated successor to the Ushiromiya family. The protagonist is Willard H. Wright, who is tasked by Bernkastel to uncover the truth behind Beatrice. The chapter delves into the past experiences of several characters, including Kinzo and the person who would become Beatrice.
Episode 8: Twilight of the Golden Witch (2010)
The final chapter focuses on Ange Ushiromiya, who in her quest to discover the truth behind the events of the Rokkenjima incident is given the chance to go to Rokkenjima as a six-year-old by Battler. Unlike the previous chapters, this chapter has features that require direct interaction from the player, allowing the player to unlock extra scenes as well as make the choice between two endings.

==== Tsubasa ====
Umineko no Naku Koro ni Tsubasa (うみねこのなく頃に翼; lit. When the Seagulls Cry Wings) (2010) is a compilation of short stories written by Ryukishi07 outside of the games, released on December 31, 2010, alongside Twilight of the Golden Witch. Several of the stories are humorous in tone, but the more serious ones are considered canon.

==== Hane ====
Umineko no Naku Koro ni Hane (うみねこのなく頃に羽; lit. When the Seagulls Cry Feathers) (2011) consists of two additional short stories written by Ryukishi07: Jessica and the Killer Electric Fan and Forgery no.XXX. It was released on December 31, 2011, alongside Golden Fantasia Cross.

==== Saku ====
Umineko no Naku Koro ni Saku (うみねこのなく頃に咲; lit. When the Seagulls Cry Bloom) (2019) is a collection of all previous official visual novel content for the series along with two additional scenarios. It was released on October 4, 2019.

Our Confession (我らの告白; Warera no Kokuhaku)
An additional scenario that goes over the creation of the Beatrice's games, from the execution of the human solution to the adornment with fantasy. It was previously released in text form in the interview book Answer to the Golden Witch 2 (2011), and is recreated here in the visual novel format.
Episode 9: Last Note of the Golden Witch
A new episode featuring a new character whose title is "Witch of the Piece" (駒の魔女, Koma no Majo).

== Production ==
=== Development ===
Umineko When They Cry is the second visual novel series produced by 07th Expansion, the first being Higurashi no Naku Koro ni. The scenario writer for the series is Ryukishi07, who also drew all of the character illustrations. Game direction was handled by Ryukishi07's younger brother Yatazakura, and the overall management of the series was handled by BT until his death in July 2009. Image and text processing was headed by Jika, who took over BT's position of overall management. Background images and photography were provided by Yatazakura, Zekozakura, Mali., and All Season Kisetsu no Irodori. The games were designed using the game engine NScripter. The music of Umineko was provided by various music artists including both professionals and dōjin artists, and Dai, the composer of most of the music found in the answer arcs of Higurashi, also had a hand in the project as the music director. The word umineko is the name of a kind of seagull known as a Black-tailed gull. Naku means "to make sound" (鳴く), specifically referring to those sounds made by non-human organisms. According to the original creator, Ryukishi07, the red character Na (な) in the logo is an official part of the title.

=== Release history ===
The first game of the Umineko When They Cry visual novel series, titled Legend of the Golden Witch, was first released on August 17, 2007, at Comiket 72. The second game Turn of the Golden Witch was released on December 31, 2007, at Comiket 73, and the third game Banquet of the Golden Witch was released on August 16, 2008, at Comiket 74. The fourth game Alliance of the Golden Witch was released on December 29, 2008, at Comiket 75. The first game in the Umineko no Naku Koro ni Chiru series, entitled End of the Golden Witch, was first released on August 15, 2009, at Comiket 76. The sixth game Dawn of the Golden Witch was released on December 30, 2009, at Comiket 77. The seventh game Requiem of the Golden Witch was released at Comiket 78 on August 14, 2010. The eighth game Twilight of the Golden Witch was released at Comiket 79 on December 31, 2010. A fan disc titled Umineko no Naku Koro ni Tsubasa was released the same day as Twilight. A second fan disc titled Umineko no Naku Koro ni Hane was released at Comiket 81 on December 31, 2011. MangaGamer released the Windows games on Steam and GOG.com in two parts, Question and Answer arcs, respectively. The release features original Ryūkishi07 sprites as well as new sprites based on Kei Natsumi's art from the manga.

Taito released a version of Legend of the Golden Witch playable on certain mobile phones on March 31, 2009. The game is playable on FOMA 900 and i703 phones, using BREW as a runtime environment. A remake for the PlayStation 3, subtitled Majo to Suiri no Rondo (魔女と推理の輪舞曲(ロンド); lit. The Rondo of the Witch and Deduction), was released by Alchemist on December 16, 2010. The release covers the original four games, and its features include a full HD rendition, all of the original soundtracks from the PC games, and full voice acting. Umineko no Naku Koro ni Chiru was similarly remade for the PlayStation 3, subtitled Shinjitsu to Gensō no Nocturne (真実と幻想の夜想曲(ノクターン), Shinjitsu to Gensō no Nokutān; lit. The Nocturne of the Truth and Illusions) and released by Alchemist on December 15, 2011. Both remakes were to be ported to the PlayStation Portable under the title Umineko no Naku Koro ni Portable (うみねこのなく頃にPortable), each to be released as two separate games. Rondo was split into Portable 1 (which covers Legend and Turn) and Portable 2 (which covers Banquet and Alliance), released on October 20 and November 17, 2011, respectively. Nocturne was to be split into Portable 3 (which was to cover End and Dawn), and Portable 4 (which was to cover Requiem and Twilight), but both games never came out. A dōjin 2D fighting game produced by 07th Expansion titled Golden Fantasia was released on December 31, 2010, at Comiket 79. An append disc, titled Golden Fantasia Cross, was released at Comiket 81 in December 2011. In addition, an Xbox 360 port of the original game developed by Alchemist was released on October 6, 2011, under the title Golden Fantasia X.

On November 3, 2018, developer Catbox Creative announced they would be launching a Kickstarter campaign for an updated version called Umineko When They Cry: Gold Edition, with an English dub. In the following weeks, they announced delays to launching the campaign before the project was quietly canceled.

A compilation of all previous official visual novel content for the series along with two additional scenarios titled Umineko no Naku Koro ni Saku (lit. When the Seagulls Cry Bloom) was released on October 4, 2019, for Windows. A port of Saku for the PlayStation 4 and Nintendo Switch, subtitled Nekobako to Musou no Koukyoukyoku (猫箱と夢想の交響曲; lit. Symphony of Catbox and Dreams) was released on January 28, 2021.

== Adaptations ==
=== Manga ===
A manga version of Legend of the Golden Witch drawn by Kei Natsumi began serialization in the January 2008 issue of Square Enix's Gangan Powered, which was later transferred to the debut May 2009 issue of Gangan Joker after Gangan Powered was discontinued, and continued until the September 2009 issue. An adaptation of Turn of the Golden Witch drawn by Jirō Suzuki began serialization in the August 2008 issue of Square Enix's GFantasy. The manga adaptation of Banquet of the Golden Witch began serialization in the October 2009 issue of Gangan Joker and is illustrated by Kei Natsumi. Sōichirō draws the adaptation of Alliance of the Golden Witch, which began serialization in Square Enix's Internet-based magazine Gangan Online on October 1, 2009. The first bound volume for Legend of the Golden Witch was released in Japan on June 21, 2008, under Square Enix's Gangan Comics imprint. Yen Press licensed the various Umineko manga published by Square Enix for release in North America. Notably, the manga adaptation includes certain departures from the original visual novel narrative, such as solutions to the gameboard mysteries previously only alluded to with riddles. In an interview with APGNation, Ryukishi07 confirmed the portrayed solutions as canonical. The manga adaptation of Twilight of the Golden Witch features the original arc Confession of the Golden Witch delving into the culprit's backstory beyond the scope revealed in Requiem of the Golden Witch.

A four-panel comic strip entitled Umineko Biyori: Rokkenjima e Yōkoso!! (うみねこびより。～六軒島へようこそ!!～) and illustrated by Makoto Fugetsu was serialized in Ichijinsha's Manga Palette Lite magazine between March 1, 2008, and March 2, 2009. A single bound volume for Umineko Biyori was released on June 22, 2009. A cross-over manga drawn by Yuki Hiiro and featuring characters from Higurashi no Naku Koro ni titled Umineko no Naku Koro ni EpisodeX Rokkenjima of Higurashi crying was serialized in ASCII Media Works's Dengeki G's Festival! Comic magazine between January 26, 2009 and February 23, 2011. Two volumes of EpisodeX were released, the first on February 26, 2010, and the second on April 27, 2011, under ASCII Media Works' Dengeki Comics imprint. The manga's story takes place roughly during the start of Episode 4's game.

=== Drama CDs ===
Frontier Works began to produce a set of drama CDs for Umineko starting with the first volume Ōgon no Kakeratachi (黄金のカケラたち; lit. Golden Fragments) released on June 24, 2009. The second volume, Ōgon Chō no Miru Yume wa (黄金蝶の見る夢は; lit. The Dream Seen by the Golden Butterfly) followed on July 23, 2009. The voice cast is the same as the anime.

=== Novels ===
Kodansha Box released novelizations of the visual novel arcs, written by Ryukishi07 himself and illustrated by Tomohi, in two volume sets, beginning with Legend of the Golden Witch released on July 1, 2009, for volume one and August 4, 2009, for volume two. Fifteen volumes were released in total, with the last released on September 30, 2018, novelizing the last arc in one volume.

=== Anime ===
A 26-episode anime adaptation based on the visual novel series aired in Japan between July 2 and December 24, 2009, on Chiba TV, and aired on additional stations at later times. The anime is produced by the animation studio Studio Deen and directed by Chiaki Kon, with Toshifumi Kawase handling series scripts and Yoko Kikuchi designing the characters based on Ryūkishi07's original concepts. The opening theme of the anime is "Katayoku no Tori" (片翼の鳥; lit. "One-Winged Bird") by Akiko Shikata, and the ending theme is "La Divina Tragedia: Makyoku" (la divina tragedia～魔曲～; lit. "The Divine Tragedy: Diabolic Song") by Jimang from Sound Horizon. The singles for both songs were released on August 19 and September 16, 2009, respectively. The anime is licensed by NIS America for release in North America and was released in two Blu-ray Disc compilation volumes in December 2012.

=== Internet radio show ===
An Internet radio show titled Umineko no Naku Koro ni Episode R: Radio of the Golden Witch aired ten episodes between August 26, 2009, and January 13, 2010. Produced by Animate TV, the show was hosted by Sayaka Ohara (the voice of Beatrice in the anime adaptation) and featured numerous guests who were also voice actors from the anime such as Daisuke Ono (Battler) and Marina Inoue (Jessica). A special episode was later aired on April 28, 2010, featuring Rina Satō (Ange) and Ryukishi07 as guests. Two CD compilation volumes containing two CDs each were released on December 23, 2009, and January 27, 2010, compiling the ten main episodes.

=== Stage play ===
Since April 2022, the theatre troupe Shingidan Mumei Classics has produced stage play adaptations of the first six episodes, under the name Umineko no Naku Koro ni: Stage of the Golden Witch (うみねこのなく頃に ～Stage of the golden Witch～) as an official collaboration project with 07th Expansion. Sayaka Ohara reprised her role as Beatrice for the performance of Episode 1. An adaptation of the seventh episode, Requiem of the Golden Witch, is slated for September 2026.

== Music ==
The visual novels have three opening theme songs. The four games of Umineko When They Cry use the opening theme "Umineko no Naku Koro ni" (うみねこのなく頃に; "When the Seagulls Cry"), composed and performed by Akiko Shikata, which was released at Comiket 74 on August 15, 2008, and for public release on August 29, 2008, by Frontier Works. The first two games of Umineko no Naku Koro ni Chiru (End and Dawn) use the opening theme "Occultics no Majo" (オカルティクスの魔女, Okarutikusu no Majo; "Occultics Witch") sung by Ayumu from Zwei. The single for "Occultics no Majo" was released on November 26, 2009, by Geneon. The last two Chiru games (Requiem and Twilight) use the opening theme "Kiri no Pithos" (霧のピトス, Kiri no Pitosu; "The Pithos in the Fog") sung by Nei Kino. The PlayStation 3 versions use different opening themes. Majo to Suiri no Rondo uses "Seikyō no Igreja" (誓響のイグレージャ, Seikyō no Igurēja; "Church of Resounding Oaths"), sung by Kokomi. Shinjitsu to Gensō no Nocturne uses "Inanna no Mita Yume" (イナンナの見た夢; "Inanna's Dream"), sung by Ayumu from Zwei.

At the end of each game, there are two ending themes: one played after the completion of the main game (or, in some episodes, after the Tea Party) when the cast of characters is shown and another played after finishing the "????" epilogue when the staff credits are shown. In Legend of the Golden Witch, "Bring the Fate" composed by Hironori Doi is the first ending theme and "Rōgoku Strip" (牢獄STRIP, Prison Strip) composed by -45 is used for the staff credits. Turn uses "Kuro no Liliana" (黒のリリアナ, Black Liliana) composed by U2 Akiyama for the first ending theme and "Senritsu (Shirabe)" (旋律（シラベ）, Melody (Shirabe)) sung by Kazumi Kimura for the staff credits. The first ending theme of Banquet is "Dread of the Grave (Rhythm ver.)" composed by SB Yune and the staff credits theme is "Active Pain" performed by Zakuro Motoki. The first ending theme for Alliance is "Discode" sung by Kanae Sakura and "Rōgoku Strip" is again used for the staff credits.

End's first ending theme is "Kodoku na Shinkaigyo" (孤独な深海魚, A Lonely Deep-Sea Fish) composed by -45 and the staff credits theme is "Tsubasa (Hope)" (翼～hope～; "Wings (Hope)") performed by Rekka Katakiri. Dawn uses "Birth of New Witch" sung by Zakuro Motoki as the first ending theme and "Usan no Kaori" (ウサンノカオリ) sung by Nei Kino for the staff credits. The first ending theme for Requiem is "The Executioner" composed by Zts and the staff credits theme "Namae no Nai Uta" (なまえのないうた; Nameless Song) is sung by Kanae Sakura. Twilight has three ending themes, and differs depending on the ending chosen. For the trick ending, the theme used is "Umineko no Naku Koro ni" by Akiko Shikata. For the magic ending, the first ending theme is "Byakumu no Mayu (Ricordando il passato)" (白夢の繭 ～Ricordando il passato～; "Cocoon of White Dreams (Remembering the Past)"), also composed and performed by Akiko Shikata. The staff credits theme is "Engage of Marionette" composed by Dai. An original soundtrack for Legend of the Golden Witch titled Essence was released on August 26, 2009.
