= Higurashi When They Cry =

Japanese visual novel series and its franchise

- Higurashi When They Cry Hō cover, featuring (from left to right): Rena, Hanyu, Satoshi, Satoko, Shion, Mion, Keiichi and Rika

ひぐらしのなく頃に (Higurashi no Naku Koro ni)
- Genre: Murder mystery; Psychological horror; Supernatural horror
- Created by: Ryukishi07; 07th Expansion
- Video game
- Developer: 07th Expansion
- Publisher: JP: 07th Expansion (Windows); JP: Alchemist (PS2, DS); JP: Kaga Create (PS3, Vita); JP: Entergram (Switch, PS4); WW: Seams (iOS, Android); WW: MangaGamer
- Genre: Visual novel
- Platform: Microsoft Windows: PlayStation 2 Nintendo DS iOS Android PlayStation 3 PlayStation Vita macOS Linux Nintendo Switch PlayStation 4
- Released: JP: 2002–2022; WW: 2009–2023; Onikakushi; JP: August 10, 2002; WW: December 15, 2009 Watanagashi; JP: December 29, 2002; WW: December 15, 2009 Tatarigoroshi; JP: August 15, 2003; WW: December 15, 2009 Himatsubushi; JP: August 13, 2004; WW: December 15, 2009 Meakashi; JP: December 30, 2004; WW: February 28, 2010 Tsumihoroboshi; JP: August 14, 2005; WW: April 15, 2010 Minagoroshi; JP: December 30, 2005; WW: May 31, 2010 Matsuribayashi; JP: August 13, 2006; WW: July 15, 2010 Rei; JP: December 31, 2006; WW: June 3, 2022 Hō; JP: August 17, 2014; WW: November 9, 2023 Hō +; JP: January 28, 2022; WW: November 9, 2023
Further information
Manga
Written by	Ryukishi07
Illustrated by	Karin Suzuragi: Yutori Hōjō Jirō Suzuki Yoshiki Tonogai Hinase Momoyama En Kitō Mimori Yuna Kagesaki
Published by	Square Enix; Kadokawa Shoten
English publisher	NA: Yen Press
Magazine	Monthly Shōnen Gangan; GFantasy; Monthly Gangan Joker; Gangan Wing; Gangan Powered
English magazine	NA: Yen Plus
Original run	March 24, 2005 – November 22, 2011
Volumes	38
Light novel
Written by	Ryukishi07
Illustrated by	Karin Suzuragi; Yutori Hōjō; Jirō Suzuki; Yoshiki Tonogai; Mimori; Rato
Published by	Square Enix
Original run	2006 – 2007
Volumes	4
Anime television series
When They Cry
Directed by	Chiaki Kon
Produced by	Hiroyuki Ōmori; Mika Nomura; Yasutaka Hyūga
Written by	Toshifumi Kawase
Music by	Kenji Kawai
Studio	Studio Deen
Licensed by	AUS: Siren Visual; NA: Sentai Filmworks (expired); Discotek Media (current); UK: MVM Films
Original network	Chiba TV, KTV, THK
Original run	April 4, 2006 – September 26, 2006
Episodes	26
Anime television series
When They Cry: Kai
Directed by	Chiaki Kon
Produced by	Hiroyuki Ōmori; Mika Nomura; Takema Okamura
Written by	Toshifumi Kawase
Music by	Kenji Kawai
Studio	Studio Deen
Licensed by	AUS: Siren Visual; NA: Sentai Filmworks (expired); Discotek Media (current); UK: MVM Films
Original network	Chiba TV, KTV, THK
Original run	July 6, 2007 – December 17, 2007
Episodes	24
Original video animation
When They Cry: Nekogoroshi Chapter
Directed by	Chiaki Kon
Produced by	Hiroyuki Ōmori; Mika Nomura; Takema Okamura
Written by	Toshifumi Kawase
Music by	Kenji Kawai
Studio	Studio Deen
Released	July 27, 2007
Runtime	23 minutes
Episodes	1
Novel series
Written by	Ryukishi07
Illustrated by	Tomohi
Published by	Kodansha
Imprint	Kodansha Box
Original run	August 2007 – March 2009
Volumes	17
Live-action film
Directed by	Ataru Oikawa
Produced by	Takeshi Oikawa
Written by	Ataru Oikawa
Music by	Kenji Kawai
Studio	Geneon Universal Entertainment; Oyashiro-Sama Partners
Released	May 10, 2008
Runtime	105 minutes
Original video animation
When They Cry: Rei
Directed by	Toshifumi Kawase
Produced by	Hiroyuki Ōmori; Mika Nomura; Takema Okamura
Written by	Toshifumi Kawase
Music by	Kenji Kawai
Studio	Studio Deen
Licensed by	AUS: Universal/Sony; NA: Sentai Filmworks (expired); Discotek Media (current); UK: MVM Films
Released	February 25, 2009 – August 21, 2009
Episodes	5
Live-action film
Higurashi no Naku Koro ni: Chikai
Directed by	Ataru Oikawa
Produced by	Takeshi Oikawa
Written by	Ataru Oikawa
Music by	Kenji Kawai
Studio	Geneon Universal Entertainment; Oyashiro-Sama Partners
Released	April 18, 2009
Runtime	106 minutes
Original video animation
Higurashi no Naku Koro ni: Kira
Directed by	Hideki Tachibana
Produced by	Yoshihito Danno; Satoshi Nagaoka; Satoshi Fukao; Takema Okamura
Written by	Toshifumi Kawase
Music by	Kenji Kawai; Tomoki Kikuya
Studio	Studio Deen
Released	July 21, 2011 – January 25, 2012
Episodes	4
Original video animation
Higurashi no Naku Koro ni: Outbreak
Directed by	Toshifumi Kawase
Produced by	Masayuki Iida; Satoshi Fukao; Shigeto Suzuki; Takema Okamura
Written by	Toshifumi Kawase
Music by	Kenji Kawai
Studio	Studio Deen
Released	August 15, 2013
Runtime	52 minutes
Episodes	1
Television drama
Directed by	Tōru Ōtsuka; Tarō Miyaoka
Produced by	Atsushi Nagauchi; Motoko Kimura; Tatsuya Itō
Written by	Tōru Hasegawa; Yō Hosaka
Studio	BS SKY PerfecTV!
Original network	BS SKY PerfecTV!
Original run	May 20, 2016 – December 16, 2016
Episodes	10
Anime television series
Higurashi: When They Cry – Gou
Directed by	Keiichiro Kawaguchi
Produced by	Takayuki Nagatani; Jōtarō Ishigami; Yūkō Hirata; Makoto Nakamura; Hirotaka Kaneko; Satoru Shimosato; Tomoyuki Ōwada; Takema Okamura
Written by	Naoki Hayashi
Music by	Kenji Kawai
Studio	Passione
Licensed by	Crunchyroll: SA/SEA: Medialink
Original network	Tokyo MX, BS11, SUN
Original run	October 1, 2020 – March 19, 2021
Episodes	24
Anime television series
Higurashi: When They Cry – Sotsu
Directed by	Keiichiro Kawaguchi
Produced by	Takayuki Nagatani; Jōtarō Ishigami; Yūkō Hirata; Makoto Nakamura; Hirotaka Kaneko; Satoru Shimosato; Tomoyuki Ōwada; Takema Okamura
Written by	Naoki Hayashi
Music by	Kenji Kawai
Studio	Passione
Licensed by	Crunchyroll: SA/SEA: Medialink
Original network	Tokyo MX, BS11, SUN, AT-X
Original run	July 1, 2021 – September 30, 2021
Episodes	15
Manga
Higurashi no Naku Koro ni Oni
Written by	Ryukishi07
Illustrated by	Asahi
Published by	Futabasha
Magazine	Monthly Action
Original run	February 25, 2022 – present
Volumes	2
Anime television series
Studio	Studio Deen
Other
Higurashi Daybreak (fighting game)
- icon

Higurashi When They Cry (Japanese: ひぐらしのなく頃に, Hepburn: Higurashi no Naku Koro ni; lit. 'When the Cicadas Cry') is a Japanese murder mystery dōjin soft visual novel produced by 07th Expansion that comprises the first two entries of the When They Cry franchise. The games are built on the NScripter game engine and the Microsoft Windows operating system.

A bonus fan disc called Higurashi no Naku Koro ni Rei was released in December 2006. Apart from the original series, new stories were created in manga form and in video games for the PlayStation 2 and Nintendo DS, to expand the story. The original eight PC releases were released in English by MangaGamer between 2009 and 2010. Two sets of drama CDs were produced, one by Wayuta and the other by Frontier Works. Novelizations of the game series were released by Kodansha between August 2007 and March 2009. A manga adapted from the video games began with eight different manga artists working separately on one to three of the multiple story arcs and were published by Square Enix and Kadokawa Shoten. The manga was licensed for release in English in North America by Yen Press under the title Higurashi: When They Cry and the first volume was released in November 2008.

Two anime television series, also known simply as When They Cry prior to 2020, were produced by Studio Deen and directed by Chiaki Kon in 2006 and 2007. A third anime adaptation was released as an OVA (original video animation) in 2009. The first anime series was licensed by Geneon Entertainment in English in 2007, but the license expired in 2011. Sentai Filmworks has since licensed both anime seasons and the 2009 OVAs. A live-action film adaptation of the series, directed and written by Ataru Oikawa, premiered in Japanese theaters in May 2008, with a sequel released in April 2009. A six-episode live-action television series adaptation premiered in Japan in May 2016, and a four-episode sequel premiered in November 2016. A new anime television series produced by Passione aired from October 2020 to March 2021, and a sequel aired from July to September 2021.

== Format and structure ==
Higurashi When They Cry is a "sound novel", a variation of visual novel with a focus on sound and atmosphere. The story is conveyed via narration and dialogue presented in on-screen text during its scenes, during which characters are displayed as static two-dimensional sprite images. The versions ported to home consoles additionally feature voice acting provided by professional Japanese voice actors. The narrative is divided into chapters, each of which covers a separate story arc, which become accessible in a sequence strictly established by the developers. The narration is conducted on behalf of various characters. After reading a certain amount of text within a chapter, playback ends. At this point, the users are invited to save their progress, as well as read "tips" that reveal details of the story's setting that were not present in the main narrative. The tips may also encourage the audience to deduce the reasoning behind the narrative's mysterious events.

The chapters are divided into two categories – "question arcs" and "answer arcs". Each question arc is a self-contained story taking place in an alternate reality, while each answer arc is based on the same scenario as a certain question arc and is intended to help the audience formulate a more accurate vision of the events of the pertaining question arc. Each chapter is assigned a "difficulty rating" that indicates the complexity of the mystery. After completing a chapter, all previously opened tips and images of individual scenes in the form of a gallery become available to the user from the main menu. In addition, the user can access a feature entitled the "Staff Room", in which writer Ryukishi07 discusses and examines the chapter, or the "All-Cast Review Session", in which the characters break the fourth wall and debate about the events of the chapter.

== Plot ==
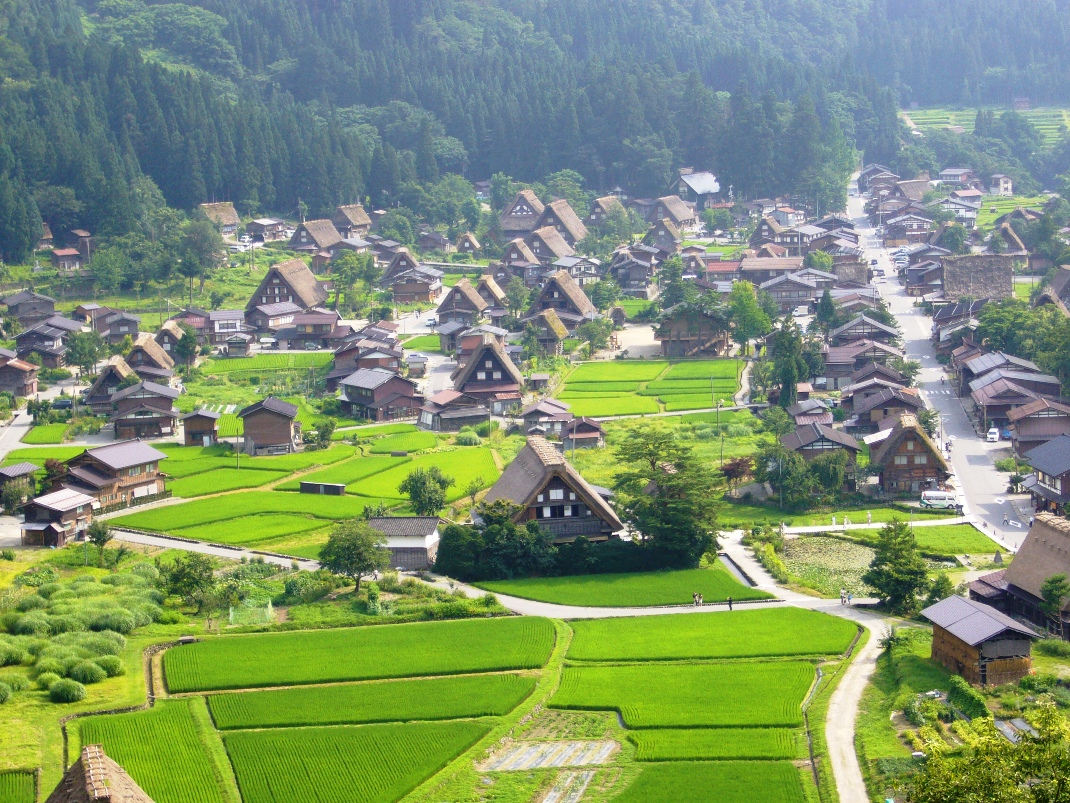
Shirakawa, Gifu, the village used as the basis for Hinamizawa

In June 1983, Keiichi Maebara moves to the village of Hinamizawa (雛見沢) and befriends five girls: Rena Ryūgū, Rika Furude, Satoko Hōjō, and the Sonozaki twins Mion and Shion. Keiichi learns of the village's annual Watanagashi Festival, a celebration dedicated to the local deity Oyashiro. Hinamizawa initially seems calm and peaceful, but shortly before the festival, Keiichi learns that for four years in a row, murders and disappearances have taken place on the day of the festival. This chain of incidents remains unsolved and has come to be known as the "Oyashiro Curse" by the superstitious villagers. The day after this year's festival, police discover the corpse of visiting freelance photographer Jirō Tomitake, who appears to have torn his throat out with his bare hands, and the charred body of Miyo Takano, a nurse in the village clinic. In most chapters of the game, Keiichi or one of his friends attempts to investigate the mysteries of Hinamizawa and the Oyashiro Curse, only to succumb to paranoia and homicidal rage. A few days after the festival, Rika's body is found in the family shrine dedicated to Oyashiro. On the same day, a cataclysm befalls the village and wipes out the population, which is explained by the media as a release of swamp gas.

The answer arcs reveal that each preceding arc is an alternate reality in which Rika fails to save herself and her friends. As a priestess of the Furude Shrine, Rika can communicate with the spirit Hanyū, who serves as the basis for Oyashiro and is the ancestress of the Furude clan. Each time Rika died, Hanyū would move her to another reality, but the end of her life is not retained in her memories when she transfers. In the final two chapters, it is revealed that the village clinic is secretly a government institute investigating a mysterious parasite in the village that causes Hinamizawa Syndrome, a disease that induces paranoia, delusion, and homicidal rage in its victims before pushing them to tear out their own throats. This disease is responsible for instigating the characters to commit murders in the previous arcs, and some of the incidents in the earlier years were caused by it. The rest of the incidents were caused by Miyo, who had killed Tomitake and faked her death, using the Oyashiro Curse as a cover. Hinamizawa Syndrome manifests in those experiencing extreme stress or those who move a distance away from the "Infection Queen", who releases a pheromone that prevents the aggravation of the villagers' condition. The women of the Furude clan have all acted as Infection Queens, and Rika is the sole remaining member of the line after the death of her parents.

The theory by Miyo's adoptive grandfather, Hifumi Takano, is that if there is no Infection Queen, all villagers will succumb to the syndrome, and a mass outbreak of violence will occur. In some of the realities, Shion, succumbing to Hinamizawa Syndrome, kills Rika. However, life in Hinamizawa goes on, showing that Hifumi's theories have been exaggerated. In most of the realities, Miyo kills Rika, and the threat of the mass outbreak convinces the government to massacre the village, with the release of swamp gas being a cover story. Miyo aims to vindicate Hifumi's work and force it to be recognized after he was shamed by the government and scientific community for his thesis about the disease. After several hundred loops, Keiichi becomes aware of the previous realities, allowing him to avoid several critical points where various characters would be murdered or driven insane. In the final loop, the group asks Hanyū to join them, and the spirit manages to manifest a physical body. With her assistance and all of the knowledge and allies they have formed along the way, they thwart Miyo's plan, and Keiichi and his friends attend the festival to move on to live happy lives afterward. Eventually, Rika travels back to the past to prevent Miyo's suffering from the traumatic childhood that led her to become who she was.

== Characters ==
=== Main characters ===
Keiichi Maebara (前原 圭一, Maebara Keiichi)
Voiced by: Sōichirō Hoshi (Japanese); Grant George (2006 anime), Khoi Dao (2020 anime) (English)
Played by: Gōki Maeda (film), Yu Inaba (TV series)
Keiichi is the male protagonist of the series.
Rika Furude (古手 梨花, Furude Rika)
Voiced by: Yukari Tamura (Japanese); Rebecca Forstadt (2006 anime), Apphia Yu (2020 anime) (English)
Played by: Aika (film), Hinata Honma (TV series)
Rika is one of Keiichi's friends and the main protagonist.
Rena Ryūgū (竜宮 レナ, Ryūgū Rena)
Voiced by: Mai Nakahara (Japanese); Mela Lee (2006 anime), Emi Lo (2020 anime) (English)
Played by: Airi Matsuyama (film), Minami Kato (TV series)
One of Keiichi's friends, Rena is kind and takes care of her friends, but is also naïve and usually subject to light teasing.
Mion Sonozaki (園崎 魅音, Sonozaki Mion)
Voiced by: Satsuki Yukino (Japanese); Megan Hollingshead (2006 anime), Michelle Rojas (2020 anime) (English)
Played by: Rin Asuka (film), Rika Nakai (TV series)
One of Keiichi's friends, Mion is Shion's identical twin sister and the leader of the after school club.

Shion Sonozaki (園崎 詩音, Sonozaki Shion)
Voiced by: Satsuki Yukino (Japanese); Megan Hollingshead (2006 anime), Michelle Rojas (2020 anime) (English)
Played by: Rin Asuka (film), Rika Nakai (TV series)
Mion's identical twin sister living in Okinomiya.
Satoko Hōjō (北条 沙都子, Hōjō Satoko)
Voiced by: Mika Kanai (Japanese); Jennie Kwan (2006 anime), Brittany Lauda (2020 anime) (English)
Played by: Erena Ono (film), Reina Seiji (TV series)
One of Keiichi's best friends, Satoko is Satoshi's younger sister, and Teppei and Tamae's niece. She has a distinctive style of speech, ending all of her sentences with ~wa.
Hanyū (羽入, Hanyū)
Voiced by: Yui Horie (Japanese); Xanthe Huynh (2020 anime) (English)
The true identity of "Oyashiro-sama".

=== Secondary characters ===
Satoshi Hōjō (北条 悟史, Hōjō Satoshi)
Voiced by: Mitsuki Saiga (drama CD), Yū Kobayashi (anime) (Japanese); Darrel Guilbeau (2006 anime), Casey Mongillo (2021 anime) (English)
Satoko's older brother as well as Teppei and Tamae's nephew. He disappeared a year before Keiichi moves to Hinamizawa. He is introduced in the question arcs as a student who had 'transferred', which the other club members refuse to elaborate on until later arcs. He and Satoko cannot distinguish the differences between cauliflower and broccoli as they are both colorblind. Satoko calls him nii-nii, a childish form of the Japanese word ani (兄; meaning older brother). It is later revealed that he had been taking the brunt of the siblings' uncle and aunt's physical and emotional abuse, often stepping in to save Satoko from suffering. This becomes mentally overwhelming for him, and he ends up killing his aunt with a metal baseball bat. Soon following the murder, he is abducted by Irie and the Mountain Dogs, and remains sedated in the secret basement of the Irie Clinic; the Mountain Dogs also frame a drug addict for the murder of his aunt.
Oyashiro (オヤシロ)
The village's tutelary deity whose sacred shrine is full of ancient torture equipment.
Kuraudo Ooishi (大石 蔵人, Ooishi Kuraudo)
(Voiced by: Chafurin (Japanese); John Snyder (2006 anime), Mark Stoddard (2020 anime) (English))
A veteran police investigator learning to solve the case about the murders and avenge the first victim who he was friends with.
Jiro Tomitake (富竹 ジロウ, Tomitake Jirō)
Voiced by: Tōru Ōkawa (Japanese); Kyle Hebert (2006 anime), John Burgmeier (2020 anime) (English)
Played by: Masashi Taniguchi (film), Yuma Ishigaki (TV series)
A freelance photographer who occasionally visits the village three times every year. He gets along with Miyo Takano, because of their similar interests in photography.
Miyo Takano (鷹野 三四, Takano Miyo)
Voiced by: Miki Itō, Fuyuka Ono (child) (Japanese); Karen Strassman (2006 anime), Mallorie Rodak (2020 anime) (English)
Played by: Ayako Kawahara (film), Rie Kitahara (TV series)
A nurse at the village clinic who takes a keen interest in Hinamizawa's past and culture, recording all her speculation in notebooks.
Kyōsuke Irie (入江 京介, Irie Kyōsuke)
Voiced by: Toshihiko Seki (Japanese); Dave Mallow (2006 anime), Cody Savoie (2020 anime) (English)
A cheerful head doctor of the clinic. Despite his young age and the fact that he has a severe maid fetish, he is highly respected in the community.
Rumiko Chie (知恵 留美子, Chie Rumiko)
Voiced by: Fumiko Orikasa (Japanese); Sam Carr (2006 anime), Macy Anne Johnson (2020 anime) (English)
Played by: Hitomi Miwa
The school teacher of Keiichi.
Mamoru Akasaka (赤坂 衛, Akasaka Mamoru)
Voiced by: Daisuke Ono, Takehito Koyasu (drama CD) (Japanese); Patrick Seitz (2006 anime), Aleks Le (2020 anime) (English)
Mamoru is the main character in Himatsubushi-hen and a police investigator at the Metropolitan Police Department in Tokyo.
Tatsuyoshi Kasai (葛西 辰由, Kasai Tatsuyoshi)
A secret agent of the Sonozaki family and Shion's caretaker.
Teppei Hōjō (北条 鉄平, Hōjō Teppei)
Satoko and Satoshi's abusive uncle, Tamae's husband, and Ritsuko's boyfriend living in Okinomiya.
Tamae Hōjō (北条 玉枝, Hōjō Tamae)
Satoko and Satoshi's abusive aunt and Teppei's wife.
Oryo Sonozaki (園崎 お魎, Sonozaki Oryō)
Mion and Shion's grandmother, and the head of the Sonozaki household. Oryō seems to be a harsh old woman and is considered the most powerful person in Hinamizawa.
Kiichiro Kimiyoshi (公由 喜一郎, Kimiyoshi Kiichirō)
Masaaki of one of the Three Families and the official village chief of Hinamizawa. He seems to be a kindly old man, but is vehement in his hatred for those who oppose the villagers.
Rina Mamiya (間宮 リナ, Mamiya Rina)
The girlfriend of Rena's father and Teppei, Rina is also known as by her real name, "Ritsuko". She is first seen when her mutilated body was found flowing down a storm drain in Tatarigoroshi-hen.
Akane Sonozaki (園崎 茜, Sonozaki Akane)
The mother of Mion and Shion, Oryō's daughter, and the leader of the Sonozaki household.
Tetsurō Okonogi (小此木, Okonogi Tetsurō)
The leader of the Yamainu mercenary working for Takano. They plan to destroy Hinamizawa, but the group betrays her.
Nomura (野村)
A mysterious woman who represents "Tokyo", an organization plotting the whole murder and massacre of Hinamizawa.
Frederica Bernkastel (フレデリカ・ベルンカステル, Furederika Berunkasuteru)
An omni-present being appearing in the universe. She is the writer of the poem about Rika's struggle to escape the fate of June 1983, giving hints about each arc.
Yukie Akasaka (赤坂 雪絵, Akasaka Yukie)
Mamoru's wife who appears in Himatsubushi-hen.
Yukikazu Kameda (亀田 幸一, Kameda Yukikazu)
Voiced by: Kazunari Tanaka
A talented baseball player who was first mentioned in Onikakushi-hen, and appears for the first time in Tatarigoroshi-hen.
Mizuho Kosaka (香坂 瑞穂, Kosaka Mizuho)
A high school student at St. Lucia Academy, an all girls school.
Suguru Okamura (岡村 傑, Okamura Suguru)
A student at the Hinamizawa Branch School who is best friends with Tomita Daiki. He is in the same year as Satoko and Rika.
Daiki Tomita (富田 大樹, Tomita Daiki)
Suguru's best friend who is in the same year as Satoko and Rika.
Eriko (エリコ)
One of Miyoko's roommates and closest friend at the orphanage.
Toshiki Inukai (犬飼 トシキ, Inukai Toshiki)
An elementary school boy and the son of the dam construction manager.
Kaieda (海江田)
The principal of the Hinamizawa Branch School. He helps the officers save Satoko from Teppei.

=== Tokihogushi-hen ===
Nagisa Ozaki (尾崎 渚, Ozaki Nagisa)
Voiced by: Mayako Nigo
A girl living in a town near Kakiuchi. She used to be energetic, but became quiet and shy later.
Osamu Tsukada (塚田 理, Tsukada Osamu)
Voiced by: Yuichi Nakamura
The second secretary of the Minister of Health and Welfare. He was Tomoe's former lover in high school, and despite his humble appearance, he is an ambitious man who is very interested in politics.

=== Meguri ===
Characters first introduced in P Higurashi When They Cry Meguri (Pひぐらしのなく頃に ～廻～, P Higurashi no Naku Koro ni Meguri) (Pachinko).

Miyabi Saionji (西園寺 雅, Saionji Miyabi)
Voiced by: Juri Kimura
In an alternate reality, she is a new transfer student to Hinamizawa, where her grandparents live, and befriends Keiichi and the rest of the school club. Prior to the Watanagashi Festival, she is invited by Takano and Tomitake to enter the Saiguden or Ritual Storehouse, where she becomes particularly interested in a naginata; this subsequently becomes her signature weapon.
In 2022, Miyabi was also introduced as a character in Higurashi Mei.

=== Mei ===
Characters first introduced in Higurashi When They Cry Mei (ひぐらしのなく頃に命, Higurashi no Naku Koro ni Mei) (iOS, Android).

Kazuho Kimiyoshi (公由 一穂, Kimiyoshi Kazuho)
Voiced by: Mayu Sagara
The main character of Mei and the granddaughter of Kiichiro Kimiyoshi.
Nao Hōtani (鳳谷 菜央, Hōtani Nao)
Voiced by: Rie Takahashi
A Tokyo native who visits Hinamizawa initially for undisclosed reasons. It is later revealed that she is in fact Rena Ryugu's half-sister.
Chisame Kurosawa (黒沢 千雨, Kurosawa Chisame)
Voiced by: Mao Ichimichi
Miyuki Akasaka's friend. Miyuki knows Chisame through her father who was a police officer working with Mamoru Akasaka.

== Production ==
=== Development ===
Back then, we were a group making cards for a game called Leaf Fight ... We sold 50 copies of Higurashi When They Cry at Comiket. We shipped 50 more to mail-order customers pretending it was a mistaken order, offering to mail them the next work for free if they sent us feedback. ... Since both the 'Watanagashi Arc and 'Tatarigoroshi arc scripts were included in the free arc, people on 2chan realized that you could read them just by opening their respective files, resulting in a bit of a frenzy.

— Ryukishi07, 2025

The series is the first visual novel series produced by 07th Expansion. The game director and scenario writer for the series are Ryukishi07, who also drew all of the character illustrations. Background images were taken from photographs taken by Ryukishi07, his younger brother Yatazakura, and Kameya Mannendō. Ryukishi07 wrote in 2004 how he was influenced by Key's works during the planning of Higurashi no Naku Koro ni. He used a similar model for the basis of Higurashi but instead of leading the player to cry, Ryukishi07 wanted to scare the player with the addition of horror elements. In this way, Ryukishi07 wished to be in some way associated with Key who he described as a "masterpiece maker".

In an interview in the December 2008 issue of Yen Press's Yen Plus manga anthology, Ryukishi07 stated that Higurashi had its origins from an unpublished theater script called Hinamizawa Teiryūjo (雛見沢停留所; Hinamizawa Bus Stop) he had written a few years before the first Higurashi game was released. When he decided to rewrite the script and release it, he wanted to build upon "the contrast between a fun, ordinary life, and something terrifying and out of the ordinary". Ryukishi07 was greatly influenced by the worlds of Seishi Yokomizo when developing the universe of Higurashi. Ryukishi07 had decided "early on to design the story so that the truth comes to light by looking at several overlapping stories", but he originally planned to release it as a single game due to initially believing he could finish the story in a single year. The word higurashi is the name of a kind of cicada. Naku means "to make sound" (鳴く), specifically referring to those sounds made by non-human organisms. According to Ryukishi07, the red Na (な) in the logo is an official part of the title.

=== Release history ===
The first game of the Higurashi: When They Cry visual novel series, titled Onikakushi-hen, was released on August 10, 2002. The second game Watanagashi-hen was released on December 29, 2002. The third game Tatarigoroshi-hen was released on August 15, 2003. The fourth game Himatsubushi-hen was released on August 13, 2004. The first four games are part of the question arcs, and the following four games, under the title Higurashi no Naku Koro ni Kai, are part of the answer arcs. The fifth game Meakashi-hen was released on December 30, 2004. The sixth game Tsumihoroboshi-hen was released on August 14, 2005. The seventh game Minagoroshi-hen was released on December 30, 2005. The eighth game Matsuribayashi-hen was released on August 13, 2006. A fan disc titled Higurashi no Naku Koro ni Rei was released on December 31, 2006. A second fan disc titled Higurashi no Naku Koro ni Hō (ひぐらしのなく頃に奉, When the Cicadas Cry: Gift) was released on August 17, 2014. In January 2021, 07th Expansion announced a remastered version with new music and upscaled graphics titled Higurashi: When They Cry Hō+ in development for a Q3 2021 release. It released on January 28, 2022, and featured a new short scenario, Mehagashi-hen, originally a mini-light novel chapter included with the Higurashi Gou BD. It also included a new All-Cast review chapter as a retrospective for the franchise and featured discussion of the Higurashi Gou and Sotsu anime arcs.

The eight original PC games were released in English by MangaGamer under the title Higurashi: When They Cry starting with the first four games released in December 2009 and the last four released in monthly intervals starting in February 2010. MangaGamer's release of the visual novels does not include several background music tracks and two bonus features specific to the original Japanese version: the music room and a minigame. The Japanese company Seams has done releases for iOS devices in Japanese and English. The Japanese version includes all eight games. The English version is based on the translation by MangaGamer and as of May 2012 includes the first five games. A remastered version of Onikakushi-hen from Higurashi: When They Cry Hō was released by MangaGamer on Steam on May 15, 2015, for Windows, OS X and Linux, with the last part of Hou+ released on November 10, 2023. The updates include a re-translation, previously cut music tracks and content, the original Japanese text, and alternative character art by illustrator Kurosaki.

A video game console port for the PlayStation 2 was released as Higurashi no Naku Koro ni Matsuri (ひぐらしのなく頃に祭, When the Cicadas Cry: Festival) by Alchemist on February 22, 2007. Higurashi is the third dōjin game to be ported to a video game console; the first was Hanakisō by HaccaWorks*, and the second was Melty Blood by French-Bread and Ecole. Due to the popularity of Matsuri, a second enhanced PlayStation 2 port, known as Higurashi no Naku Koro ni Matsuri: Kakera Asobi (ひぐらしのなく頃に祭 カケラ遊び, When the Cicadas Cry: Festival - Playing with the Pieces), was released on December 20, 2007. It contains all of Matsuri's content apart from Matsuribayashi-hen from the original games and other bonus contents.

Four video games for the Nintendo DS under the collective title Higurashi no Naku Koro ni Kizuna (ひぐらしのなく頃に絆; When the Cicadas Cry: Bond) with new story arcs are being developed by Alchemist. The first, with the added title Tatari (祟; Curse), was released on June 26, 2008, containing the first three chapters from the question arcs, and a new chapter entitled Someutsushi-hen, with its story based on the Onisarashi-hen manga series. The second, with the added title Sō (想; Idea), was released in November 2008. The third game in the series, with the added title Rasen (螺, Spiral), was released in March 2009. The final game, subtitled Kizuna (絆, Bond), was released in February 2010.

A PlayStation 3 and PlayStation Vita port titled Higurashi no Naku Koro ni Sui (ひぐらしのなく頃に粋, When the Cicadas Cry: Style) and published by Kaga Create was released in Japan on March 12, 2015. This edition features all scenarios from previous console versions, in addition to full voice acting, new songs, CGs, minigames and functions. A Nintendo Switch port titled Higurashi: When They Cry Hō and published by Entergram was released in Japan on July 26, 2018. It includes the previous content covered by Sui, in addition to three new scenarios adapted from the Windows version of Hō.

A mobile phone RPG game titled Higurashi no Naku Koro ni Mei (ひぐらしのなく頃に命, When the Cicadas Cry: Life) and planned by D-techno, written by Kiichi Kanō and developed by Smile Axe was released on September 3, 2020.

== Adaptations ==
=== Drama CDs ===
Several sets of drama CDs based on the series have been released, mainly distributed by Frontier Works and Wayuta. The latter's releases differ from other media adaptations in that they make extensive use of the source material from the original sound novels, and sometimes include original songs from dai's albums. The main eight sound novel arcs have been adapted into a total of eleven CD releases, published by HOBiRECORDS and distributed by Wayuta and Geneon Entertainment, between May 27, 2005, and March 9, 2012; Minagoroshi-hen and Matsuribayashi-hen have been split into two and three separate releases respectively. Each chapter is 200–300 minutes long and contains 3-6 discs. The CDs feature remixes of the games' music and sound effects and the voice cast members have been chosen by Ryūkishi07 himself, though some of them have been changed for the anime and PS2 release due to scheduling conflicts. The booklets included with the CDs contained passwords that, if entered on the official site, unlocked downloads to audio files that adapted the TIPS for each of the arcs. In response to fan requests, audio TIPS for the first five arcs later became available on drama CDs named Append Disc 01, released on December 29, 2005, at Comiket 69, and Append Disc 02, released on October 26, 2007. HOBiRECORDS has also released three drama CDs that adapted several fan-submitted stories from the Kataribanashi-hen novel/manga anthology arc. The first CD was released on April 25, 2007, the second on May 9, 2008, and the third on April 24, 2009.

=== Manga ===
There are eight main titles in the Higurashi manga series, spanning the four question arcs and the four answer arcs. Each question arc manga are compiled into two bound volumes. The first two answer arc manga are compiled into four volumes, meanwhile Minagoroshi-hen is compiled into six volumes, and Matsuribayashi-hen into eight. The manga uses multiple artists between the various arcs. Karin Suzuragi drew Onikakushi-hen, Tsumihoroboshi-hen, and Matsuribayashi-hen, Yutori Hōjō drew Watanagashi-hen and Meakashi-hen, Jirō Suzuki drew Tatarigoroshi-hen, Yoshiki Tonogai drew Himatsubushi-hen, and Hinase Momoyama drew Minagoroshi-hen. Another manga entitled Kokoroiyashi-hen (心癒し編, Heart Healing Chapter) is drawn by Yuna Kagesaki and began in Kadokawa Shoten's magazine Comp Ace on August 26, 2008. The manga series was licensed by Yen Press for English distribution in North America under the title Higurashi: When They Cry. The manga was initially serialized in Yen Press' Yen Plus anthology magazine, the first issue of which went on sale on July 29, 2008. The first English volume of the manga was originally planned to be sold in early 2009, but was released in November 2008.

There are three side-stories related to the main Higurashi story, but with new characters. The first, named Onisarashi-hen (鬼曝し編, Demon Exposing Chapter), is drawn by En Kitō and was serialized between March 2005 and July 2006 in Comp Ace. The next, entitled Yoigoshi-hen (宵越し編, Overnight Chapter), is drawn by Mimori and was serialized between in GFantasy between 2006 and 2007. The last side story is known as Utsutsukowashi-hen (現壊し編, Reality Breaking Chapter) is also drawn by En Kitō and was serialized in Comp Ace between 2006 and 2007. A manga adaptation of Higurashi's precursor Hinamizawa Teiryūjo began serialization in the debut issue of Square Enix's Big Gangan magazine, sold on October 25, 2011.

A manga spin-off illustrated by Asahi, titled Higurashi no Naku Koro ni Oni, began serialization in Futabasha's Monthly Action magazine on February 25, 2022.

=== Novels ===
There are four light novels which contain additional illustrations by five different artists, and seventeen novelizations of the separate visual novel arcs.

In September 2010, editor Katsushi Ōta confirmed on Twitter that the novelizations would be re-released in bunkobon editions. The re-releases were published by Seikaisha with new cover art by Tomohi from January 12, 2011, to June 8, 2012. In 2020, the series received new bunkobon editions illustrated by Sato Yoshimi, published by Futabasha under the Futabasha Junior Bunko label, starting with Onikakushi-hen on October 23.

=== Anime ===
Logo frequently used in Western releases

The first anime television series was animated by Studio Deen and produced by Frontier Works, Geneon Entertainment and Sotsu. It is directed by Chiaki Kon, with Toshifumi Kawase handling series composition, Kyūta Sakai designing the characters and Kenji Kawai composing the music. The season covers the four question arcs and the first two answer arcs, and aired in Japan between April 4 and September 26, 2006, comprising 26 episodes. Most of the characters were played by the same voice actors as the drama CD series. The series is available on DVD in Japan, France and North America (following Geneon Entertainment's licensing of the series). However, Geneon's U.S. division announced that it discontinued all ongoing anime projects in September 2007, including Higurashi on November 6, 2007. Only three of a planned six DVDs of Higurashi were released, under the title When They Cry: Higurashi. On July 3, 2008, Geneon and Funimation announced an agreement to distribute select titles in North America. While Geneon still retained the license, Funimation assumed exclusive rights to the manufacturing, marketing, sales and distribution of select titles. Higurashi was one of the several titles involved in the deal. Funimation released a complete box set of the series in August 2009. However, the rights to the series expired in August 2011, due to low sales. In July 2015, Sentai Filmworks licensed both anime series. In January 2025, Discotek Media acquired the streaming rights to the series after Sentai Filmworks lost the rights.

People in Japan, who had bought all nine of the DVDs of the first season, had the chance to receive a special anime DVD entitled Higurashi no Naku Koro ni Gaiden Nekogoroshi-hen, based on the short story that was given to those who had bought the manga. Despite being a bonus for the first season (and having the first season's opening and closing sequences), Nekogoroshi-hen featured Sakai's updated character designs from the second season.

A continuation of the series produced by the same core staff, and based on one new story arc and the final two original answer arcs of the franchise, entitled Higurashi no Naku Koro ni Kai (ひぐらしのなく頃に解, lit. When the Cicadas Cry: Solution), aired in Japan between July 6 and December 17, 2007, containing twenty-four episodes. Sentai Filmworks has licensed the second anime series. As the result of a murder case in September 2007 in Japan involving the murder of a police officer by his sixteen-year-old daughter with an axe, as well as the Japanese media relating the case to anime such as Higurashi, the latest episode screenings of both Higurashi no Naku Koro ni Kai and another anime at the time, School Days, were canceled by a number of stations, due to excessive violence.

An original video animation (OVA) series, entitled Higurashi no Naku Koro ni Rei (ひぐらしのなく頃に礼, lit. When the Cicadas Cry: Gratitude), was released on February 25, 2009, and is directed and written by Toshifumi Kawase, with Kazuya Kuroda taking over Sakai's role as character designer. The series also started a limited broadcasting in Bandai Channel prior to DVD release. Sentai Filmworks has licensed the Rei OVAs. The OVA contains three story arcs, Hajisarashi-hen, Saikoroshi-hen and Hirukowashi-hen, with Saikoroshi-hen concluding in three episodes, and the other two arcs concluding in one episode each. Hajisarashi-hen was originally a light novel included with the limited edition of the PlayStation 2 game Higurashi no Naku Koro ni Matsuri, and took the place of Batsukoishi-hen from the Higurashi no Naku Koro ni Rei fandisc. Frontier Works announced another original video anime series, Higurashi no Naku Koro ni Kira (ひぐらしのなく頃に煌, lit. When the Cicadas Cry: Glitter) in March 2011, to celebrate the tenth anniversary of Higurashi no Naku Koro ni. It is directed and storyboarded by Hideki Tachibana and written by Kawase, with Tomoyuki Abe taking over Kuroda's role as character designer and Tomoki Kikuya serving as additional music composer. An OVA film titled Higurashi When They Cry: Outbreak (ひぐらしのなく頃に拡〜アウトブレイク〜, Higurashi no Naku Koro ni Kaku: Autobureiku; lit. When the Cicadas Cry: Expansion: Outbreak), adapted from Ryukishi07's short story "Higurashi Outbreak", was announced in December 2012 and was later released in August 2013. Sakai returned as a character designer for Outbreak.

==== Gou and Sotsu ====
On January 6, 2020, 07th Expansion and Kadokawa announced that a new anime project by Passione was in production. Akio Watanabe served as a character designer and Infinite served as a producer. Keiichiro Kawaguchi directed the series, with Naoki Hayashi handling series composition and Kenji Kawai returning as music composer. The main cast reprised their roles. The series was set to premiere in July 2020, but was delayed to October 2020 due to the COVID-19 pandemic. The series aired from October 1, 2020, to March 19, 2021. The series, entitled Higurashi When They Cry: Gō (ひぐらしのなく頃に業, Higurashi no Naku Koro ni Gō; lit. When the Cicadas Cry: Karma), was acquired by Funimation and streamed on its website in North America and the British Isles, and on AnimeLab in Australia and New Zealand. Following Sony's acquisition of Crunchyroll, the series was moved to Crunchyroll. In Southeast Asia and South Asia, Medialink has acquired the series, and are streaming the series on its YouTube channel Ani-One. Before episode 2 aired, the title of the anime was Higurashi: When They Cry – New and it was marketed as a remake to the original anime series. When episode 2 aired, the subtitle was changed to Gō (業, Karma) and it was revealed that the anime is not actually a direct remake as it was previously marketed to be. The new series ran for 24 episodes.

After Gō finished broadcast, a sequel, titled Higurashi: When They Cry (Sotsu) (ひぐらしのなく頃に卒, Higurashi no Naku Koro ni Sotsu; lit. 'When the Cicadas Cry: (Finishing, Graduation or Death'), was announced. The series aired from July 1 to September 30, 2021. Funimation will stream the series. Following Sony's acquisition of Crunchyroll, the series was moved to Crunchyroll. In Southeast Asia and South Asia, Medialink has acquired the series, and are streaming the series on its YouTube channel Ani-One.

==== New anime ====
On June 21, 2026, Kadokawa announced during a livestream commemorating the 20th anniversary of the first anime series that another new Higurashi anime television series had been green-lit. It was also announced that Studio Deen would return to do the animation and the original cast would reprise their roles.

=== Live-action ===
A live-action film titled Higurashi no Naku Koro ni (ひぐらしのなく頃に), also known as Shrill Cries of Summer worldwide, directed and written by Ataru Oikawa, premiered in Japanese theaters on May 10, 2008. The film is an adaptation of the first story arc, Onikakushi-hen. Gōki Maeda plays Keiichi, Airi Matsuyama plays Rena, Rin Asuka plays Mion, Aika plays Rika, and Erena Ono plays Satoko. The film was released in 60 theaters and earned over ¥200 million at the box office. A sequel, also live action, was released in Japanese theaters on April 18, 2009, and is titled Higurashi no Naku Koro ni Chikai (ひぐらしのなく頃に誓, When the Cicadas Cry: Oath), also known as Shill Cries: Reshuffle in international versions.

A live-action television series adaptation directed by Tōru Ōtsuka and starring Yu Inaba as Keiichi premiered in Japan on May 20, 2016, on cable channel BS SKY PerfecTV!. The cast includes the members of NGT48. A four-episode sequel premiered on November 25, 2016.

A stage play titled Higurashi no Naku Koro ni -Ryū/Mei-, directed Ito Masami in co-operation with 07th Expansion and Shingekidan Yumemei Classics, was performed in 2019 between July 24 and July 28. Notable cast members include Maho Sugita who played the role of Rena.

== Music ==
The soundtrack of Higurashi When They Cry is composed by Kenji Kawai and the albums were produced by Frontier Works. Volume 1 was released on July 21, 2006, and volume 2 was released on October 6, 2006, in Japan. Three character song CDs were also released, sung by voice actors from the anime adaptation, between March 28 and July 25, 2007. The second season anime's opening theme is "Naraku no Hana" also sung by Shimamiya. The first season's opening theme includes a hidden message: the unintelligible lyrics at the beginning ("hange hara harei") were generated by reversing the phrase Nigerarenainda (逃げられないんだ; lit. 'There's no escape'). The second season's opening theme also includes a reversed part at the end ("Ie hanan") which was made by playing backwards the reversed bit from the first opening theme. The ending theme is "Taishō a" performed by anNina. The first OVA season's opening theme is "Super scription of data" by Shimamiya, and the ending theme is "Manazashi" (まなざし) by anNina.

== Reception ==
=== Visual novels ===
Reception

Review scores
Publication	Score
Famitsu	31/40
APGNation	8.5/10
Hardcore Gamer	4.5/5 stars

Over 100,000 copies of the original games were sold in Japan by 2006, a feat not attained by a dōjin game since Type-Moon released Tsukihime. Many fans attribute the game's success to the suspense and horror the novel portrays. Fan-based community boards emerged where fans began discussing their own theories. The popularity of the games grew rapidly as many took interest in their well-outlined script and story, which eventually led the game to be showcased in large gaming magazines with positive reviews. With the announcement of the live-action film adaptation of Onikakushi-hen came the news that over 500,000 copies of the games had been sold, by August 13, 2007. The enhanced PlayStation 2 port, Higurashi no Naku Koro ni Matsuri, had sold 140,397 copies by October 11, 2007. Later console releases in the series, between December 2007 and January 2019, have sold 408,391 copies in Japan, as of February 2019, bringing total software sales to 908,391 copies in Japan.

The PS2 version received a total review score of 31/40 (out of the four individual review scores of 9, 8, 8 and 6) from the Japanese gaming magazine Famitsu. The game was voted the tenth most interesting bishōjo game by readers of Dengeki G's Magazine in an August 2007 survey. Its English-language release also received a positive reception from critics.Hardcore Gamer stated that the "writing is incredibly eerie, and amazingly effective" and concluded that "few video games make it anywhere near the skillful story weaving present within the Higurashi series." APGNation stated the "Excellent writing and music make for an evocative reading experience."

=== Manga ===
In Japan, the third volume of the manga adaptation ranked as the 19th weekly best-selling book on January 16, 2008. The first volume ranked as the 18th weekly bestseller on June 10, 2008. The fourth volume ranked as the 19th bestseller on January 14, 2009. In the United States, the first volume was ranked 253rd in the top 300 graphic novels sold in November 2008 and ranked as 25th in the top 25 Manga sold in the first quarter of 2009 release of ICv2 Retailers Guide to Anime/Manga.

The manga series had over 8 million copies in circulation by 2009; and over 10 million copies in circulation by 2020.

Debi Aoki of About.com stated that reading the chapters in succession as they were presented in its serialization in Yen Plus made the story "easier to follow" and built the suspense better. Justin Colussy-Estes of Comic Village praised the setting for hinting at something "much darker". He also praised the structure stating that the "mystery develops slowly" to immerse the reader in the characters and then later force the reader to "confront the possibility that one or more of them may be [the] murderer"; a decision he described as "clever". Phil Guie of Popcultureshock expressed that this characterization "is brushed aside" for the horror as it gave the friendship between characters "real depth" adding to the surprise of the plot twists. Anime News Network's Casey Brienza praised the manga for being an "effective" horror story, as it follows a harem manga plot, which "becomes terrifying" producing an effect that is "trashy horror at its absolute greatest". She expressed being surprised by the end of the second volume as the central question remains unanswered though still felt the manga is "wholly enjoyable and satisfying" nonetheless. Brienza stated that although the artwork is "average", the illustrator "seems to know exactly how to transition between the adorable and the abominable—and does so with dramatic, nightmarish effect." Aoki described the artwork as although "pander[ing] to otaku fetishes" containing and awkward character designs, providing "overbearing cutesiness [that] makes the secrets that the girls are hiding behind their smiles just that much creepier."

=== Anime ===
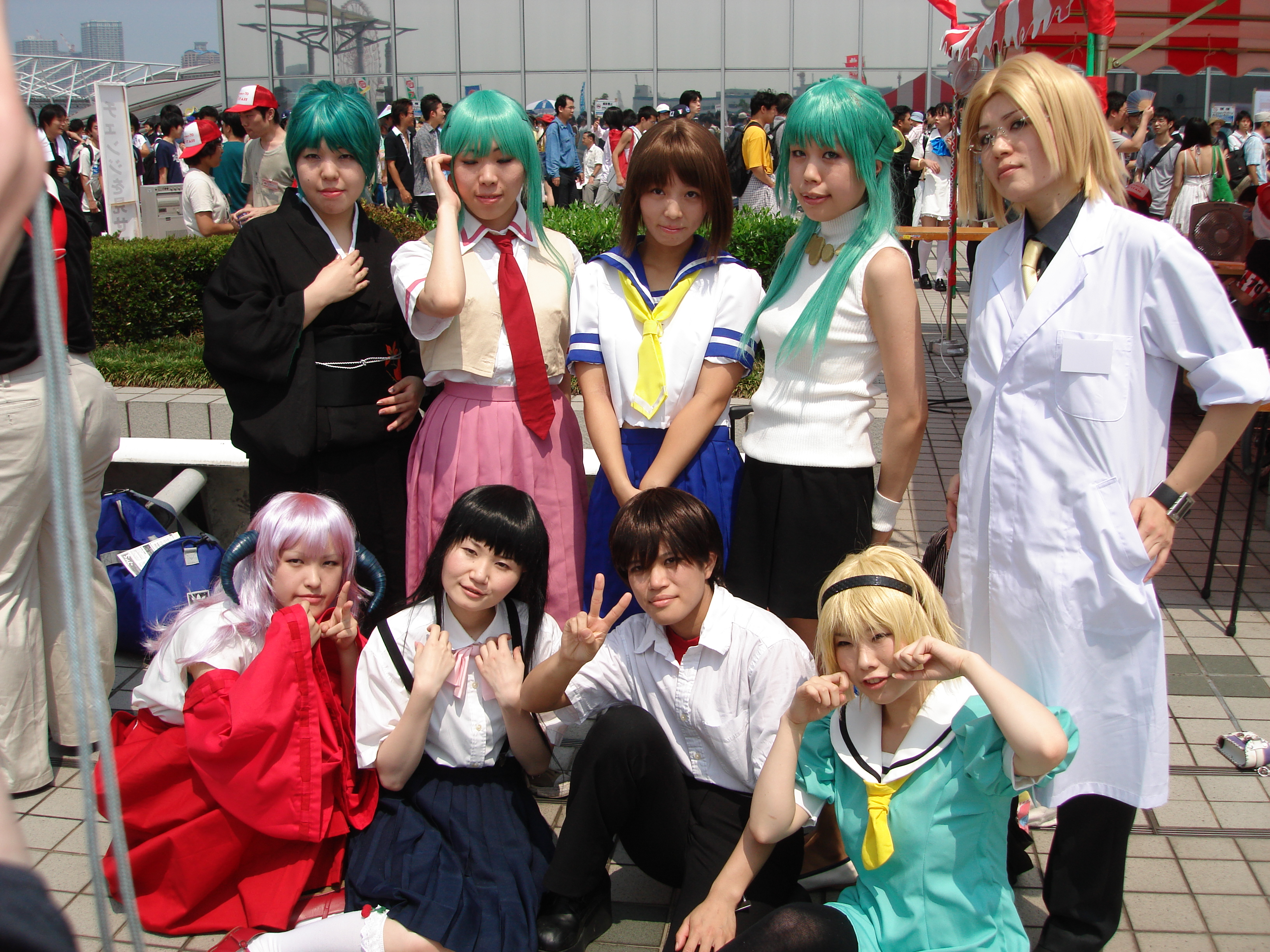
Fans cosplaying as Higurashi When They Cry characters in 2006

Rebecca Silverman from Anime News Network praised the anime series for its storytelling, atmosphere, characters and horror feeling, giving it an overall rating of "A-", and stated "Despite some dated artwork, When They Cry holds up really well as a horror title. It has mystery, gore, and an interesting conceit that keeps it interesting from arc to arc, and we're given just enough new information each time the story resets to keep us hooked. It isn't as gruesome as other series, which actually is a plus for squeamish viewers, and this season ends with just enough answers to make us want to know what's really going on. Even if you've seen it before, it's worth rewatching When They Cry because knowing what's coming only makes the story more interesting. Improves on rewatching, builds on itself very well and generally good voices for both languages, scary without being too gross. So come take a trip to Hinamizawa and find out another reason why the devil is in charge of small towns."

A review by The Escapist gave the anime a positive review. James Henley praised the story, saying that each arc is interesting in its own way, but said that watching Kai was necessary to completely understand the story. He also praised the cast of characters, and how, despite having only one main male character, it never falls into harem genre, and how each one has a unique back story, revealed in different arcs. He criticized the dub as poor quality, but recommended the anime, mainly subbed, if one "can stomach the brutality". The Anime Almanac similarly praised the story, as a unique method of storytelling and the art of the characters, and went to add that the "moe" design on the girls made the scary scenes special. He ultimately recommended the series. Another review, from THEM Anime Reviews, giving it 3 out of 5 stars, praising the story, but panning the sorrow of the characters and the violence, saying "Higurashi is a hard show to watch; while it's interesting, each chapter is progressively soul-sucking and depressing, as the characters struggle desperately to avoid grisly fates, often to no avail, multiple times." He finished the review by saying "...Higurashi is interesting and visceral enough to be worth viewing by the more adventurous."

=== Legacy ===
The 2010 Scooby-Doo! Mystery Incorporated episode "When the Cicada Calls" references the series.

In 2025, Konami enlisted Ryukishi07 for Silent Hill f, as they believed they needed someone who could "really understand the essence of Japanese horror".
