= Atsuko Tanaka filmography =

Atsuko Tanaka had numerous voice-over roles in television shows, films, and video games, as well as dubbing roles in foreign media.

== Voice acting roles ==
=== Animation ===
List of voice performances in animation for television and direct-to-video productions
Year	Series	Role	Notes	Source
1993	Mobile Suit Victory Gundam	Juca Mellasch		
1993	Lupin III: Voyage to Danger	Karen Korosky		
1994	Yamato Takeru	Shaman		
1994	Blue Seed	Kanbayashi's Mother		
1994	Mahoujin Guru Guru	Bikein		
1994	Macross 7	Margarita		
1994–1995	My Sexual Harassment	Miyakawa Yumi		
1995	Black Jack	Abumaru 虻丸	OVA Ep. 6	
1995	Fushigi Yûgi	Okuda Takiko, Soi		
1995	Princess Minerva	Cheloria Yurisis		
1995	Megami Paradise	Mamamega new		
1995	Toma Kishenden Oni	Carla		
1995–1996	Virtua Fighter	Eva Durix		
1996	Reideen the Superior	Reiko Amakai 天賀井玲子		
1996	Kiko-chan's Smile	Ballet teacher バレエの先生		
1996	YAT Anshin! Uchu Ryokou	Anne Marigold		
1996–1997	Variable Geo	Miranda Jahana		
1997	Speed Racer X	Cecil Hazuki セシル葉月		
1997	Kindaichi Case Files	Mika Sasamoto 笹本美華		
1997–1999	Agent Aika	Neena Hagen		
1997	Psycho Diver Magical Bodhisattva	Sophie ソフィ	OVA (General)	
1997	Master of Mosquiton '99	Wolf Lady		
1997	Berserk	Slan		
1998	AWOL - Absent Without Leave	Dana McLaren		
1998	Trigun	Claire		
1998	Cowboy Bebop	Coffee		
1998	Yu-Gi-Oh!	Hajime Imori		
1998	Fancy Lala	Yumi Haneishi		
1998	Brain Powerd	Shiela Glass		
1998–1999	Master Keaton	Kayoko Kida		
1998–1999	Super Doll Licca-chan	Puru		
1999	Legend of Himiko	Fujina		
1999	Angel Links	Valeria Vertone		
1999–2001	Bubu Chacha	Coney Land コニー・ランド	Also Daisuki	
1999–2000	Great Teacher Onizuka	Nanako Mizuki's mother		
1999	Reign: The Conqueror	Cassandra		
1999	Karakurizōshi Ayatsuri Sakon	Futaba Akitsuki		
2000	Gravitation	Kaoruko 薫子		
2001	Salaryman Kintaro	Misuzu Suenaga 末永美鈴		
2001	Go! Go! Itsutsugo Land	Natsumi kan なつみかん		
2001	Captain Tsubasa: Road to 2002	Matsumoto Kaori 松本香		
2002	Mirage of Blaze	Soup だし		
2002	RahXephon	Sayoko Nanamori		
2002	WXIII: Patlabor the Movie 3	Misaki Saeko		
2002	Battle Fairy Yukikaze	Magny マーニィ	OVA (General)	
2002–2006, 2020	Ghost in the Shell: Stand Alone Complex	Motoko Kusanagi	Also 2nd Gig, Solid State Society, and SAC_2045	
2002	Heat Guy J	Elisa Ryan		
2002	Weiß Kreuz Glühen	Maki Tsujii 辻井真海		
2003	Wolf's Rain	Jagara		
2003	Dear Boys	Kyoko Himuro		
2003	Battle Programmer Shirase	Kotoe Amano		
2003	The Galaxy Railways	Katarina Cheryl		
2003	Maburaho	Masaki Kazakini 風椿麻衣香		
2004	Angelique	Dexia		
2004–2005	Monster	Margot Langer		
2004	Tweeny Witches	Atelia		
2004	Agatha Christie's Great Detectives Poirot and Marple	Miss Lemon		
2004	Destiny of the Shrine Maiden	Ame no Murakumo		
2004	Black Jack	Konomi Kuwata/Black Queen		
2005	Super Robot Wars Original Generation: The Animation	Viletta Vadim	OVA	
2005	Gallery Fake	Fei Cui		
2005	Lupin III: Angel Tactics	Kaoru		
2005	Black Cat	Echidna Parass		
2005	Noein	Miyuki Gotou		
2005	Cotaetecho-dai	A bad mother giving only 3 years cup Men; 3年間カップメンしか与えない悪母		
2005	Fate/stay night	Caster		
2006	Ergo Proxy	Lacan		
2006	Utawarerumono	Karura		
2006–2007	Le Chevalier D'Eon	Elizabeth		
2006	Shonen Onmyouji	Takaokami no Kami		
2006	Super Robot Wars Original Generation: Divine Wars	Viletta Badim		
2006	Kenichi: The Mightiest Disciple	Freya 久賀舘要		
2006	Hataraki Man	Maiko Kaji		
2006	Strain: Strategic Armored Infantry	Medlock		
2007	Shattered Angels	Mika		
2007	Les Miserables: Shojo Cosette	Zephine		
2007	Moonlight Mile	Fatma Toure Gutuu	OVA 2 parts	
2007	Devil May Cry: The Animated Series	Trish		
2007	Hero Tales	Hongo 紅英		
2008	Hatenko Yugi	Ililia Rose		
2008	Major	Jinnai Mary's 陣内マリー	4th TV series	
2008	Persona: Trinity Soul	Michiyo Kayano		
2008	Shigofumi: Letters from the Departed	Naoko Tateishi	TV ep. 4	
2008	Noramimi	Torimi		
2008	Amatsuki	Inugami		
2008	Duel Masters Cross	Chimera, Zakira (childhood)		
2008	Kamen no Maid Guy	Hyouchuka		
2008	Special A	Sumire Karino		
2008	Top Secret ~The Revelation~	Tomoko Nomiyama		
2008	Golgo 13	Eva Krugman		
2008	Chiko, Heiress of the Phantom Thief	White-haired Demon		
2008	Akane Iro ni Somaru Saka	Nagase		
2008	Hell Girl: Three Vessels	Sakura Inuo		
2009	The Tower of Druaga: The Sword of Uruk	Amina		
2009	Genji Monogatari Sennenki	King's wife		
2009	Queen's Blade series	Claudette	Exiled Virgin and Evil Eye	
2009	Valkyria Chronicles	Eleanor Varrot		
2009	Sōten Kōro	Bian Linglong		
2009	Kawa no Hikari	Blue	TV movie special	
2009	Utawarerumono	Karura	OVA (General)	
2009	Umineko no Naku Koro ni	Kyrie Ushiromiya		
2009	Princess Lover!	Josephine Joestar		
2009	Naruto: Shippuden	Konan		
2009	Nyan Koi!	Nyamsas		
2009	A Certain Scientific Railgun	Harumi Kiyama		
2009	Tegami Bachi	Bonnie		
2009	Aoi Bungaku Series	Madam	Eps. "Osamu Dazai's No Longer Human (Ningen Shikkaku)"	
2009–2010	Kiddy Girl-and	Ellis		
2010	Ikki Tousen: Xtreme Xecutor	Moukaku		
2010–2011	Pokémon: Black and White	Aloe		
2010	Super Robot Wars Original Generation: The Inspector	Villeta Vadim		
2010–2013	The World God Only Knows	Yuri Nikaido		
2011	Gintama	Fumiko フミ子		
2011	Blade	Cod タラ		
2012	Ozma	Bynas		
2012	Rock Lee & His Ninja Pals	Konan		
2012	Queen's Blade: Rebellion	Claudette		
2012	Lupin III: The Woman Called Fujiko Mine	Cicciolina		
2012	Sengoku Collection	Brutal Maiden Hisahide Matsunaga		
2012	Tari Tari	Naoko Takakura		
2012	Campione!	Lucretia Zola		
2012	Kokoro Connect	Reika Nagase		
2012	Busou Shinki	Narrator		
2012	Little Busters!	Announcer		
2013	JoJo's Bizarre Adventure: Battle Tendency	Lisa Lisa		
2013	Dokidoki! Precure	Marmo		
2013	Stella Women's Academy, High School Division Class C3	Teacher		
2013	Fate/Kaleid Liner Prisma Illya	Caster		
2013	Gingitsune	Etsuko Toyokura子		
2014	SoniAni	Kabuko Jagi		
2014	Magical Warfare	Violet North		
2014–2015	Knights of Sidonia	Samari Ittan	Also Battle for Planet Nine	
2014	Glasslip	Mikako Okura		
2014	Gundam Reconguista in G	Wilmit Zenam		
2014	Fate/stay night: Unlimited Blade Works	Caster	2 seasons	
2014	Parasyte -the maxim-	Ryoko Tamiya		
2014	Your Lie in April	Yuriko Ochiai		
2014	Girl Friend Beta	Shizuko Todo 藤堂静子		
2014	Detective Conan	Mary Sera, Chihaya Hagiwara		
2015	The Rolling Girls	Haru Fujiwara		
2015–2016	The Heroic Legend of Arslan	Tahamine	2 seasons	
2015	God Eater	Amamiya Tsubaki 雨宮ツバキ		
2015	The Idolmaster Cinderella Girls	Executive Director Mishiro 美城常務		
2015	Lupin the Third	Elena Gotti エレナ・ゴッティ	4th TV series	
2015	Utawarerumono: The False Faces	Karura		
2015–2016	Mobile Suit Gundam: Iron-Blooded Orphans	Amida Arca	2 seasons	
2016	Pandora in the Crimson Shell: Ghost Urn	Uzal Delilah		
2016–2017	Super Lovers	Haruko D. Dieckmann	2 seasons	
2016	The Disastrous Life of Saiki K.	Sexy ladies セクシー女性		
2016	Thunderbolt Fantasy	Narrator		
2016	Magic-kyun Renaissance	Anjo's mother		
2016	The Glass Mask Year 3 Class D	Chigusa Tsukikage		
2017	ACCA: 13-Territory Inspection Dept.	Mauve		
2017	Garo: Vanishing Line	Sister		
2018	Devilman Crybaby	Silene シレーヌ	ONA (Netflix)	
2018	A.I.C.O. -Incarnation-	Akiko Nanbara	ONA (Netflix)	
2019	Azur Lane	HMS Hood		
2020	Kingdom Season 3	Ka Rin		
2020	Listeners	Kim		
2020	Jujutsu Kaisen	Hanami		
2020	The Gymnastics Samurai	Mari Aragaki		
2021	The Way of the Househusband	Hibari Torii	ONA (Netflix)	
2021	Kimi to Fit Boxing	Laura		
2022	Utawarerumono: Mask of Truth	Karulau		
2022	Lucifer and the Biscuit Hammer	Muu		
2023	Make My Day	Cathy Beck	ONA (Netflix)	
2023	Reign of the Seven Spellblades	Esmeralda		
2023	Frieren	Flamme		
2024	The Wrong Way to Use Healing Magic	Rose		
2024	Brave Bang Bravern!	Kunus		
2024	Yatagarasu: The Raven Does Not Choose Its Master	Ōmurasaki no Omae		
2025	#Compass 2.0: Combat Providence Analysis System	Violetta Noire	Posthumous Final Role	

=== Films ===
List of voice performances in feature films
Year	Series	Role	Notes	Source
1995	Macross 7: Galaxy is Calling Me!	Margarita マルガリータ	movies	
1995	Ghost in the Shell	Motoko Kusanagi		
1997	Hermes - Winds of Love ヘルメス—愛は風の如く	Mermaid Delone 人魚デルモーネ	movies	
1997	Spur to Glory Story of Inokaya Chiharu 栄光へのシュプール 猪谷千春物語	Seto Inokoi 猪谷定子	movies	
1999	The Kindaichi Juvenile Case 2: Death Blue of Slaughter	Yoshie Aikawa 藍沢由理恵	movies	
2002	WXIII: Patlabor the Movie 3	Misako 岬冴子	movies	
2004	Ghost in the Shell 2: Innocence	Motoko Kusanagi		
2006	Brave Story	Genius of sunlight 陽光の神将	movies	
2007	Piano Forest	Amamiya Namie 雨宮奈美江	movies	
2009	Space Battleship Yamato: Resurrection	Queen Ilya イリヤ女王	movies	
2010	Fate/stay night Unlimited Blade Works	Caster	film	
2011	Fullmetal Alchemist: The Sacred Star of Milos	Mr. Crichton クライトン母	movies	
2011	Tekken: Blood Vengeance	Nina Williams		
2012	Doraemon: Nobita and the Island of Miracles—Animal Adventure	Professor Kelly		
2013	Bayonetta: Bloody Fate	Bayonetta		
2015	Knights of Sidonia movie	Summary · Itanium サマリ・イッタン	movies	
2015	Chiari and Cherry ちえりとチェリー	Lady · Emerald レディ・エメラルド	movies	
2015	Sleep Tight My Baby, Cradled in the Sky	Yuri Aoshima	Limited theatrical release	
2016	Nemuriko Tsuki to the Sky's Shrine ねむれ思い子 空のしとねに	Yuri Aojima 蒼嶋ユリ	a Japanese independent film	
2017	Black Butler: Book of the Atlantic	Francis Midford		
2017	Bleeding Steel	Astrid Tanaka		
2018	Batman Ninja	Poison Ivy		
2018	I Want to Eat Your Pancreas	Haruki's mother		
2021	Detective Conan: The Scarlet Bullet	Mary Sera		

=== Video games ===
List of voice performances in video games
Year	Series	Role	Notes	Source
1993	Night Trap	Lisa		
1995	Seifuku Densetsu Pretty Fighter X	Shizaki Sorami		
1995	Philosoma	Michau		
1995	Quantum Gate I	Jenny		
1996	Angelique Special	Dia		
1996	Fushigi no Kuni no Angelique	Dia		
1996	People at Nonomura Hospital	Akiko Nonomura	SS, PC Adult	
1996	Fist	Tokikaze	PS1 / PS2	
1997	Doukyuusei Mahjong	Reiko Shinjiji	PS1/PS2	
1997	Eve Burst Error	Aqua Lloyd	SS	
1997	Refrain Love: Anata ni Aitai	Takamiya Sachiko		
1997	Doukyuusei 2	Misako Narusawa	SS, PS1/PS2	
1997	Desire	Christy Shepard		
1997	B Senjou no Alice	Candoll		
1997	Zen-Nippon Bishoujou Grand Prix: Find Love	Voice		
1998	Misa no Mahou Monogatari	Izabeal du Joleju		
1998	Succubus: Fallen Angel	Maya マヤ	PC Adult	
1998	Efficus this thought to you	Maria Kurata 倉田まりあ	PS1 / PS2	
1999	Himiko-den: Renge	Fujinami 藤那	PS1 / PS2	
1999	Shinseiki GPX Cyber Formula: Aratanaru Chousensha	Nemesis (female)		
1999	Street Fighter III: 3rd Strike	Chun-Li		
1999	Maria 2	Saeko Midorikawa 緑川冴子	PS1 / PS2	
1999	Someday, to the overlapping future	Rouge · vanstaju ルージュ・ヴァンスタージュ	PS1 / PS2	
1999	Sailor Moon: Sailor Angel with Memories	Angel Torane/Sailor Angel	PC Adult	
1999	Darcrows	Elaine / Queen エレーヌ / 王妃	PC Adult	
2000	Marvel vs. Capcom 2: New Age of Heroes	Ruby Heart	PS2	
2000	Brigandine Grand Edition	Halley, Ricarat ハレー / リカーラ	PS1 / PS2	
2000	Super Robot Wars Alpha	Viletta Vadim	PC Adult	
2000	Boku no Natsuyasumi	Saori	PS1 / PS2	
2000	Gunparade March	Honda Setsuko 本田節子	PS1 / PS2	
2001	Sakura Wars 3: Is Paris Burning?	Phyton ビトン	DC	
2001	Super Robot Wars Alpha Gaiden	Viletta Vadim	PC Adult	
2001	Mister Mosquito	Narrator	PS1 / PS2	
2002	Onimusha 2	Takajo 高女	PS1 / PS2	
2002	Boku no Natsuyasumi 2	Yoshana 芳花	PS2, also PSP in 2010	
2002	Jake Hunter: Innocent Black	Himuro Toko 氷室透子	PS1 / PS2	
2002	Utawarerumono games	Karura	Also PS2 port in 2006 and Portable in 2009	
2003	Mister Mosquito 2: Let's Go Hawaii	Narration ナレーション	PS1 / PS2	
2003	EVE burst error PLUS	Aqua	PC Adult, PS1/PS2	
2003	Ys I & II: Eternal Story	Sarah Tovah	PS1/PS2	
2003	Rahxephon: Blue Sky Fantasia	Yoko Nanamori 七森小夜子	PS1 / PS2	
2003	Nightshade	Hibana	PS2	
2004	Shadow Hearts II	Saki Inugami	PS1 / PS2	
2004	Inuyasha: The Secret of the Cursed Mask	Utsugi (female)	PS2	
2004	Bloody Roar 4	Marvel	PS1 / PS2	
2004	3 Years Set up at the teacher 's legendary teacher Kinpakuhachi!	St. Marks 聖さおり	PS1 / PS2	
2004	Berserk: Millennium Falcon Hen Seima Senki no Shō	Slan スラン	PS1 / PS2	
2005	Armored Core: Formula Front	Lecture movie レクチャームービー	PC Adult	
2005	Bokura no Kazoku	Tomorrow Haya Yu 明日葉優	PS1 / PS2	
2005	Baldr Force EXE	Reika Tachibana 橘玲佳	PS1 / PS2	
2005	Namco × Capcom	Chun-Li, Regina	PS1/PS2	
2005	The Sword of Etheria	Almira	PS1 / PS2	
2005	Fullmetal Alchemist 3: Kami o Tsugu Shōjo	Lieutenant Colonel Venus Rosemaria	PS1 / PS2	
2005	3rd Super Robot Wars Alpha: To the End of the Galaxy	Viletta Vadim	PS Adult	
2005	Shikigami no Shiro Nanayoduki Gensokyoku	Fumiko, Ozette, Vanstein ふみこ・オゼット・ヴァンシュタイン	PC Adult	
2005	Yoshinori Yoshinaga	Genji Genji 源義経	PC Adult ☆メチャカッコいい☆	
2006	Dirge of Cerberus: Final Fantasy VII	Rosso the Crimson	PS2	
2006	Black Cat: Machinist's Angel	Echidna Parass	PS1 / PS2	
2006	Valkyrie Profile 2: Silmeria	Ahly	PS1 / PS2	
2006	Boku no Natsuyasumi Portable: Mushimushi Hakase to Teppen-yama no Himitsu!!	Saori 沙織	PSP	
2006	Wrestle Angels Survivor	Azumi Nakamori / Leila Kirishima 中森あずみ / 霧島レイラ	PS1 / PS2	
2007	Super Robot Taisen Original Generations	Viletta		
2007	Professor Layton and the Curious Village	Lady Dahlia サロメ夫人	DS	
2007	Fate/stay night Réalta Nua	Caster	PS1 / PS2, also remake in 2012	
2007	Shōnen Onmyōji 少年陰陽師 翼よいま、天へ還れ	God of high grace 高淤の神	PS1 / PS2	
2007	Everybody's Golf 5	sapphire サファイア	PS3	
2007	Dragoneer's Aria	Sonia Orth ソニア・オルト	PSP	
2007	Fate/tiger colosseum	Caster	PSP	
2007	Tales of Innocence	Mathias	DS	
2007	Shikigami no Shiro III	Fumiko, Ozette, Vanstein ふみこ・オゼット・ヴァンシュタイン	Arcade, Wii	
2008	Armored Core: For Answer	Win · D · Fashion ウィン・D・ファンション	PS3, Xbox 360 ネクスト「レイテルパラッシュ」を駆るリンクス	
2008	Star Ocean: Second Evolution	Opera Vectra	PSP	
2008	Valkyria Chronicles	Eleanor Varrot	PS3	
2008	Fate/tiger colosseum Upper	Caster	PSP	
2008	Valkyrie Profile: Covenant of the Plume	Natalia ナタリア	DS	
2008	Wrestle Angels Survivor 2 レッスルエンジェルス サバイバー2	Azumi Nakamori / Hex Hazuki 中森あずみ / 六角葉月	PS1 / PS2	
2008	The Last Remnant	Emma Honeywell	Xbox 360	
2008	Fate/unlimited codes	Caster	PS2, also Portable 2009	
2008	Dissidia Final Fantasy	Ultimecia	PSP	
2009	Yakuza 3	Saki's mother 咲の母	PS3	
2009	Atelier Rorona: The Alchemist of Arland	Astrid Zxes	PS3, also Plus in 2013 and Beginning Story in 2015	
2009	Magna Carta 2	Kaitin ケイティン	Xbox 360	
2009	Final Fantasy Crystal Chronicles: The Crystal Bearers	Amida Terion アミダテリオン	Wii	
2009	Phantasy Star Portable 2	Ursula · Laurent ウルスラ・ローラン	PSP, also Infinity in 2011	
2009	Queen's Blade: Spiral Chaos	Claudette	PSP, also 2011	
2010	Valkyria Chronicles II	Eleanor Varrot	PSP	
2010	God Eater	Amamiya camellia 雨宮ツバキ	PSP, Also Burst	
2010	NieR Replicant	Kaine	PS3	
2010	Umineko no Naku Koro ni: Majo to Suiri no Rondo	Ushiromiya Kyrie 右代宮霧江	PS3	
2011	Valkyria Chronicles III	Eleanor Varrot	PSP	
2011	The Last Story	Witchcraft witch いにしえの魔女	Wii	
2011	Marvel vs. Capcom 3: Fate of Two Worlds	Trish	PS4, Xbox 360, Also Ultimate	
2011	Dissidia 012 Final Fantasy	Ultimecia	PSP	
2011	El Shaddai: Ascension of the Metatron	Gabriel	PS3, Xbox 360	
2011	Atelier Meruru: The Apprentice of Arland	Astrid Zxes	PS3	
2011	Final Fantasy Type-0	Arecia Al-Rashia	PSP	
2011	Umineko no Naku Koro ni Chiru: Shinjitsu to Gensō no Nocturne	Kyrie Ushiromiya 右代宮霧江	PS3	
2011	Call of Duty: Modern Warfare 3	Mrs. Davis	PS3, Xbox 360	
2012	Street Fighter X Tekken	Poison		
2012	Tales of Innocence R	Mathias		
2012	Dragon Age II	Cassandra Pentaghast	PS3, Xbox 360	
2012	Zero Escape: Virtue's Last Reward	Alice	3DS	
2012	Fire Emblem Awakening	Flavia	3DS 公式にサンプルボイス2有。軍事国家フェリアの東の王	
2012	Assault Gunners	Jenny Vasquez ジェニー・バスケス	Other ナビゲーターの一人。階級は少佐。中の人ネタ？	
2012	Aquapazza	Karura	PS3	
2013	Demon Gaze	Lancelona Beowulf ランスローナ・ベオウルフ	PSVita, also Global Edition 2014	
2013	Shin Megami Tensei IV	Gabby / Black Samurai ギャビー / 黒きサムライ	3DS	
2013	The Last of Us	Tess	PS3	
2013	Metro: Last Light	Anna アンナ	PS3, Xbox 360	
2013	Final Fantasy XIV: A Realm Reborn	Merlwyb Bloefhiswyn		
2013	JoJo's Bizarre Adventure: All Star Battle	Lisa Lisa	PS3, Also R	
2013	Shirahana no Ori ~Hiiro no Kakera 4~ Shiki no Uta 白華の檻 ～緋色の欠片4～ 四季の詩	Shinsei nest Sun god 神産巣日神	PSP	
2014	Ultra Street Fighter IV	Poison	PS3	
2014	Naruto Shippuden: Ultimate Ninja Storm Revolution	Konan 小南	PS3, Xbox 360	
2014	Bayonetta 2	Bayonetta, Rosa	Wii U includes port of original Bayonetta game with Japanese audio track	
2014	Fatal Frame: Maiden of Black Water	Hisoka Kurosawa 黒澤密花	Wii	
2014	Fate/hollow ataraxia	Caster		
2015	Ninja Slayer	Shin · Ninja シ・ニンジャ	Other	
2015	The Witcher 3: Wild Hunt	Yennefer	PS4, Xbox One, also Game of the Year edition in 2016	
2015	Devil May Cry 4: Special Edition	Trish	PC, PS4, Xbox One	
2015	Final Fantasy XIV: Heavensward	Merlwyb Bloefhiswyn	OS X, PC, PS3, PS4	
2015	Dragon's Dogma Online	Vanessa	PC, PS3, PS4	
2015	Utawarerumono: Mask of Deception	Karura	PS3, PS4, PSVita	
2015	Project X Zone 2: Brave New World	Hibana	3DS	
2015	Dissidia Final Fantasy NT	Ultimecia	Arcade, PS3	
2015	JoJo's Bizarre Adventure: Eyes of Heaven	Lisa Lisa	PS3, PS4	
2015	Fate/Grand Order	Medea, Jing Ke, Carmilla	Android, iOS	
2015	Xenoblade Chronicles X	Avatar (Female)	Wii U	
2016	Yakuza Kiwami	Reina	PC, PS3, PS4	
2016	Detective Pikachu	Dorothy Fisher	3DS	
2016	Super Smash Bros. for Wii U and Nintendo 3DS	Bayonetta	Wii U & Nintendo 3DS (DLC)	
2016	Naruto Shippuden: Ultimate Ninja Storm 4	Konan 小南	Other	
2016	Dark Rose Valkyrie	Oyagaya Miyako 小長谷ミヤコ	Other	
2017	Nioh	Yodogimi	PC, PS4	
2017	Azur Lane	HMS Hood, KMS Tirpitz	Android, iOS	
2018	Fitness Boxing	Laura	Nintendo Switch	
2018	Super Smash Bros. Ultimate	Bayonetta	Nintendo Switch	
2019	Jump Force	Galena / Angela	PC, PS4, Xbox One	
2019	Final Fantasy Opera Omnia	Ultimecia	Android, iOS	
2019	Devil May Cry 5	Trish, Eva	PC, PS4, Xbox One	
2019	Street Fighter V: Arcade Edition	Poison	Arcade, PC, PS4	
2020	Fitness Boxing 2: Rhythm and Exercise	Laura	Nintendo Switch	
2020	Octopath Traveler Tairiku no Hasha	Herminia	Android, iOS	
2021	A Certain Magical Index: Imaginary Fest	Harumi Kiyama	Android, iOS	
2021	Famicom Detective Club: The Missing Heir	Azusa Kasuga	Nintendo Switch	
2021	Tales of Arise	Almeidrea Kaineris	PC, PS4, PS5, Xbox One, Xbox Series X/S	
2022	Eve: Ghost Enemies	Umiko Tetsuno	PS4, Nintendo Switch	
2022	Bayonetta 3	Bayonetta	Nintendo Switch	
2022	Goddess of Victory: Nikke	Enikk	Android, iOS, PC	
2023	Genshin Impact	Rhinedottir	Android, iOS, PC, PS4, PS5	
2023	Bayonetta Origins: Cereza and the Lost Demon	Rosa	Nintendo Switch	
2024	Another Code: Recollection	Sofia Callaghan	Nintendo Switch	
2024	Jujutsu Kaisen: Cursed Clash	Hanami	Nintendo Switch, PC, PS4, PS5, Xbox One, Xbox Series X/S	
2024	Shin Megami Tensei V: Vengeance	Lilith リリス	Nintendo Switch, PC, PS4, PS5, Xbox One, Xbox Series X/S	
2024	Persona 5: The Phantom X	Kayo Tomiyama	Android, iOS, PC	
	Tomb Raider II	Lara Croft		
	Tomb Raider III	Lara Croft		
	Tomb Raider: The Last Revelation	Lara Croft		
	Ratchet & Clank series		1,3,4,5	

=== Drama CD ===
List of voice performances in drama CDs and audio recordings
Year	Series	Role	Notes	Source
1996	Dragon Quest VI	Scala シェーラ	2 volumes	
2000	Tsubasa: Those with Wings	Shouka		
2004	Fullmetal Alchemist Vol.2 Shadow of truth light truth 鋼の錬金術師 Vol.2 偽りの光 真実の影	Renoir · Winslet ルノア・ウィンスレット		
2005	Akaiito Drama CD "Keikura Demon] アカイイトドラマCD「京洛降魔」	Suzuka 鈴鹿		
2007–2008	Devil May Cry	Trish	2 volumes	
2008	Metal Slader Glory	Silquine / Marceau シルキーヌ・マルソー		
2006	Oku Toshigami sound picture scroll 大奥 極上音絵巻	Tokugawa Yoshimune 徳川吉宗		

=== Tokusatsu ===
List of voice performances in anime for television and direct-to-video productions
Year	Series	Role	Notes	Source
2005	Mahou Sentai Magiranger	Hades Wise God Gorgon	Eps. 35–40	
2006	Juken Sentai Gekiranger	Michelle Peng	Eps. 19–49	

== Dubbing roles ==
=== Live action ===
List of Japanese dubbing performances on overseas productions
Title	Role	Voice dub for	Notes	Source
Malice	Tracy Safian	Nicole Kidman		
Batman Forever	Dr. Chase Meridian	Nicole Kidman		
The Portrait of a Lady	Isabel Archer	Nicole Kidman		
The Peacemaker	Dr. Julia Kelly	Nicole Kidman	2001 TBS edition	
The Human Stain	Faunia Farley	Nicole Kidman		
Fur	Diane Arbus	Nicole Kidman		
The Golden Compass	Mrs. Coulter	Nicole Kidman	2010 TV Asashi edition	
Rabbit Hole	Becca Corbett	Nicole Kidman		
Trespass	Sarah Miller	Nicole Kidman		
The Paperboy	Charlotte Bless	Nicole Kidman		
Stoker	Evelyn Stoker	Nicole Kidman		
Before I Go to Sleep	Christine Lucas	Nicole Kidman		
Grace of Monaco	Grace Kelly	Nicole Kidman		
Secret in Their Eyes	Claire Sloan	Nicole Kidman		
Lion	Sue Brierley	Nicole Kidman		
Big Little Lies	Celeste Wright	Nicole Kidman		
The Beguiled	Miss Martha Farnsworth	Nicole Kidman		
The Killing of a Sacred Deer	Anna Murphy	Nicole Kidman		
Boy Erased	Nancy Eamons	Nicole Kidman		
The Goldfinch	Mrs. Barbour	Nicole Kidman		
Bombshell	Gretchen Carlson	Nicole Kidman		
The Undoing	Grace Fraser	Nicole Kidman		
The Northman	Queen Gudrún	Nicole Kidman		
Special Ops: Lioness	Kaitlyn Meade	Nicole Kidman		
Pearl Harbor	Evelyn Carnahan	Kate Beckinsale		
Underworld	Selene	Kate Beckinsale		
Van Helsing	Anna Valerious	Kate Beckinsale	2007 TV Asahi edition	
Underworld: Evolution	Selene	Kate Beckinsale		
Vacancy	Amy Fox	Kate Beckinsale		
Underworld: Awakening	Selene	Kate Beckinsale		
The Trials of Cate McCall	Cate McCall	Kate Beckinsale		
Absolutely Anything	Catherine West	Kate Beckinsale		
Underworld: Blood Wars	Selene	Kate Beckinsale		
Flesh and Bone	Ginnie	Gwyneth Paltrow		
Seven	Tracy Mills	Gwyneth Paltrow	1999 TV Tokyo edition	
A Perfect Murder	Emily Taylor	Gwyneth Paltrow		
Hush	Helen Baring	Gwyneth Paltrow		
Possession	Maud Bailey	Gwyneth Paltrow		
Iron Man	Pepper Potts	Gwyneth Paltrow	2011 TV Asahi edition	
Iron Man 2	Pepper Potts	Gwyneth Paltrow	2012 TV Asahi edition	
The Mummy	Evelyn Carnahan	Rachel Weisz		
Sunshine	Greta	Rachel Weisz		
Stalingrad	Tania Chernova	Rachel Weisz		
Runaway Jury	Marlee	Rachel Weisz		
Agora	Hypatia of Alexandria	Rachel Weisz		
Denial	Deborah Lipstadt	Rachel Weisz		
Black Widow	Melina Vostokoff / Black Widow	Rachel Weisz		
Maid in Manhattan	Marisa Ventura	Jennifer Lopez		
Gigli	Ricki/Rochelle	Jennifer Lopez		
Shall We Dance?	Paulina	Jennifer Lopez		
An Unfinished Life	Jean Gilkyson	Jennifer Lopez		
Bordertown	Lauren Adrian	Jennifer Lopez		
El Cantante	Nilda Georgina "Puchi" Román	Jennifer Lopez		
Friends	Phoebe Buffay; Ursula Buffay	Lisa Kudrow		
Analyze This	Laura MacNamara	Lisa Kudrow		
P.S. I Love You	Denise Hennessey	Lisa Kudrow		
Hotel for Dogs	Lois Scudder	Lisa Kudrow		
The Girl on the Train	Martha	Lisa Kudrow		
A Dangerous Affair		Monica Bellucci		
Irréversible	Alex M	Monica Bellucci		
L'ultimo capodanno	Giulia	Monica Bellucci		
Under Suspicion	Chantal Hearst	Monica Bellucci		
How Much Do You Love Me?	Daniela	Monica Bellucci		
Conspiracy Theory	Alice Sutton	Julia Roberts	2000 TV Asahi edition	
America's Sweethearts	Kathleen "Kiki" Harrison	Julia Roberts		
The Mexican	Samantha	Julia Roberts	2004 TV Asahi edition	
Valentine's Day	Cpt. Katherine "Kate" Hazeltine	Julia Roberts		
Congo	Karen Ross	Laura Linney		
Primal Fear	Janet Venable	Laura Linney		
The City of Your Final Destination	Caroline Gund	Laura Linney		
Teenage Mutant Ninja Turtles: Out of the Shadows	Rebecca Vincent	Laura Linney		
The Gift	Annabelle "Annie" Wilson	Cate Blanchett		
Bandits	Kate Wheeler	Cate Blanchett	2005 NTV edition	
The Life Aquatic with Steve Zissou	Jane Winslett-Richardson	Cate Blanchett		
Mrs. America	Phyllis Schlafly	Cate Blanchett		
Little Miss Sunshine	Sheryl Hoover	Toni Collette		
Fright Night	Jane Brewster	Toni Collette		
Knives Out	Joni Thrombey	Toni Collette		
102 Dalmatians	Chloe Simon	Alice Evans		
24	Audrey	Kim Raver		
3000 Miles to Graceland	Cybil Waingrow	Courteney Cox		
Addicted to Love	Linda	Kelly Preston		
Alien: Covenant	"Mother"	Lorelei King		
Antichrist	"She"	Charlotte Gainsbourg		
Army of One	Marci Mitchell	Wendi McLendon-Covey		
Bad Boys	Julie Mott	Téa Leoni		
Batman & Robin	Dr. Pamela Isley / Poison Ivy	Uma Thurman	2000 TV Asahi edition	
Being John Malkovich	Maxine Lund	Catherine Keener		
Below	Claire Paige	Olivia Williams		
Beverly Hills 90210	Tracy	Jill Novick		
The Bold Type	Jacqueline Carlyle	Melora Hardin		
Broken Arrow	Terry Carmichael	Samantha Mathis		
Cold Case	Det. Lilly Rush	Kathryn Morris		
The Counselor	Malkina	Cameron Diaz		
The Count of Monte Cristo	Mercedès Mondego	Dagmara Domińczyk		
CSI	Julie Finlay	Elisabeth Shue	season 12	
Cube 2: Hypercube	Kate Filmore	Kari Matchett		
Dark Water	Dahlia Williams	Jennifer Connelly		
The Divergent Series: Insurgent	Jeanine Matthews	Kate Winslet		
Dolores Claiborne	Selena St. George	Jennifer Jason Leigh		
Double Cross	Vera Blanchard	Kelly Preston		
The Edge of Seventeen	Mona	Kyra Sedgwick		
Elementary	Joan Watson	Lucy Liu		
Ender's Game	Theresa Wiggin	Andrea Powell		
Entrapment	Virginia "Gin" Baker	Catherine Zeta-Jones	2002 TV Asahi edition	
ER	Anna Del Amico	Maria Bello		
The Expendables	Lacy	Charisma Carpenter		
The Expendables 2	Lacy	Charisma Carpenter		
The Faculty	Delilah Profitt	Jordana Brewster		
The Family Man	Kate Reynolds	Téa Leoni		
Faster	Detective Cicero	Carla Gugino		
The Fate of the Furious	Cipher	Charlize Theron		
F9	Cipher	Charlize Theron		
Fast X	Cipher	Charlize Theron		
Forces of Nature	Sarah Lewis	Sandra Bullock		
Gattaca	Irene Cassini	Uma Thurman		
Get Smart	Agent 99	Anne Hathaway	2011 TV Asahi edition	
Get the Gringo	Kid's Mom	Dolores Heredia		
Ghost in the Shell	Major Mira Killian/Motoko Kusanagi	Scarlett Johansson		
The Gingerbread Man	Mallory Doss	Embeth Davidtz		
Gossip Girl	Diana Payne	Elizabeth Hurley		
Hackers	Margo Wallace	Lorraine Bracco		
Halo	Dr. Catherine Elizabeth Halsey	Natascha McElhone		
Harry Potter and the Deathly Hallows – Part 2	Lily Potter	Geraldine Somerville		
His Dark Materials	Marisa Coulter	Ruth Wilson		
Hollow Man	Linda McKay	Elisabeth Shue		
The Hours	Laura Brown	Julianne Moore		
House of the Dragon	Princess Rhaenys Targaryen	Eve Best		
Hummingbird	Sister Cristina	Agata Buzek		
The Huntsman: Winter's War	Queen Ravenna	Charlize Theron		
In Love and War	Agnes von Kurowsky	Sandra Bullock		
Indecent Proposal	Diana Murphy	Demi Moore	1997 NTV edition	
Inglourious Basterds	Bridget von Hammersmark	Diane Kruger		
I.T.	Rose Regan	Anna Friel		
JAG	Lt. Col. Sarah MacKenzie	Catherine Bell		
Jerry Maguire	Avery Bishop	Kelly Preston		
Jurassic World	Karen Mitchell	Judy Greer	2017 NTV edition	
Kill Switch	Frankie Miller	Holly Elissa Dignard		
Killing Me Softly	Deborah	Natascha McElhone		
King Kong	Dwan	Jessica Lange	1998 TV Asahi edition	
Kingsman: The Golden Circle	Poppy Adams	Julianne Moore		
Kramer vs. Kramer	Joanna Kramer	Meryl Streep	2009 Blu-Ray edition	
Lassie	Sarah Carraclough	Samantha Morton		
The Last of Us	Tess	Anna Torv		
The Last Song	Kim Miller	Kelly Preston		
Le Havre	Arletty	Kati Outinen		
Licence to Kill	Pam Bouvier	Carey Lowell	1999 TV Asahi edition	
Life Is Beautiful	Dora Orefice	Nicoletta Braschi	2001 TV Asahi edition	
Little Women	Margaret "Meg" March	Trini Alvarado		
The Lost Symbol	Inoue Sato	Sumalee Montano		
The Man from Laramie	Barbara Waggoman	Cathy O'Donnell	2004 DVD edition	
Meet Dave	Gina Morrison	Elizabeth Banks		
Melancholia	Claire	Charlotte Gainsbourg		
Moneyball	Sharon	Robin Wright		
The Monkey King 2	Baigujing	Gong Li		
Mothers and Daughters	Georgina	Mira Sorvino		
The Mummy: Tomb of the Dragon Emperor	Evelyn C. O'Connell	Maria Bello		
Nim's Island	Alex Rover	Jodie Foster		
Norman	Alex Green	Charlotte Gainsbourg		
The One	T.K. Law and Massie Walsh	Carla Gugino		
Patriot Games	Annette	Polly Walker		
Planet of the Apes	Ari	Helena Bonham Carter	2005 NTV edition	
The Possession	Stephanie Brenek	Kyra Sedgwick		
The Postman	Abby	Olivia Williams		
The Proposal	Margaret Tate	Sandra Bullock		
Rambo: Last Blood	Carmen Delgado	Paz Vega	2022 BS Tokyo edition	
Red Dwarf	Harmony	Lucie Pohl		
Reign Over Me	Donna Remar	Saffron Burrows		
Reservation Road	Grace Learner	Jennifer Connelly		
Righteous Kill	Detective Karen Corelli	Carla Gugino		
The Rookie	Lorri	Rachel Griffiths		
Safe House	Catherine Linklater	Vera Farmiga		
The Sessions	Cheryl Cohen-Greene	Helen Hunt		
Shade	Tiffany	Thandie Newton		
Sleepless in Seattle	Maggie Baldwin	Carey Lowell		
Spy	Nancy B. Artingstall	Miranda Hart		
The Spy Next Door	Gillian	Amber Valletta		
Surrogates	Maggie Greer	Rosamund Pike		
Terminal Velocity	Chris Morrow/Krista Moldova	Nastassja Kinski	1997 TV Asahi edition	
Third Person	Anna Barr	Olivia Wilde		
Today You Die	Agent Rachel Knowles	Sarah Buxton		
Transamerica	Margaret	Elizabeth Peña		
Troy	Helen	Diane Kruger		
The Twilight Zone	Nina Harrison	Sanaa Lathan		
Ultraman Powered	Primary official	Brenta Cremy		
Vicky Cristina Barcelona	María Elena	Penélope Cruz		
A Walk in the Clouds	Victoria Aragon	Aitana Sánchez-Gijón		
A Walk on the Moon	Pearl Kantrowitz	Diane Lane		
Wild	Bobbi Grey	Laura Dern		
Winning Time: The Rise of the Lakers Dynasty	Claire Rothman	Gaby Hoffmann		

=== Animation ===
Date	Title	Role	Notes	Source
2004	Beast Machines: Transformers	Botanica		
2010	Toy Story 3	Dolly		
2011	Rango	Angélique		
2011	Hawaiian Vacation	Dolly		
2015	Inside Out	Jill Andersen / Riley's Mother		
2017	The Lego Batman Movie	Computer		
2017	Kubo and the Two Strings	Monkey / Sariatu		
2019	Spider-Man: Into the Spider-Verse	Vanessa Fisk		
2019	Toy Story 4	Dolly		
2019	Love, Death & Robots	11-45-G		
