= Bokura no Kazoku =

2005 video game

- Cover art
- Developer: Millennium Kitchen (Note: Additional work by Sony Computer Entertainment Japan.)
- Publisher: Sony Computer Entertainment
- Director: Kaz Ayabe
- Designer: Kaz Ayabe
- Artist: Mineko Ueda
- Writer: Kaz Ayabe
- Platform: PlayStation 2
- Release: JP: March 24, 2005
- Genre: Simulation
- Mode: Single-player

Bokura no Kazoku (Note: Japanese: ぼくらのかぞく, Hepburn: Bokura no Kazoku; spelled completely in hiragana; lit. "Our Family"; subtitled as "My Family Growing up in the 21st Century") is a 2005 simulation video game developed by Millennium Kitchen and published by Sony Computer Entertainment for the PlayStation 2. It was released only in Japan. The game follows a couple in Tokyo over the course of thirty-five in-game years as they have children and raise a family. Gameplay occurs in an open-ended environment where choices made by the player influence how the couple raises their children. Bokura no Kazoku received mixed reviews from critics, and underperformed in sales.

== Synopsis ==
In Bokura no Kazoku, the player assumes the role of a newlywed couple in their early thirties living in contemporary Koenji, a residential area in Tokyo. The game follows the couple over the course of thirty-five in-game years, from their marriage to their retirement, as they have children and raise a family.

== Gameplay ==
Bokura no Kazoku is a simulation game where the player's actions determine how the central couple raises their children. The personality of each child is influenced by choices made by the player – such as what hobbies they pursue, the school they attend, and how time is spent together as a family – with fourteen possible personality options. The game is open-ended in its gameplay, and imposes no specific objectives or obligations of gameplay progression on the player.

In the game's first playthrough the couple has three children, though completing the game unlocks additional scenarios that allow the couple to have more children in subsequent playthroughs, to a maximum of eight.

== Development ==
Bokura no Kazoku was developed by Millennium Kitchen and directed, written, and designed by Kaz Ayabe. The company and Ayabe had previously developed the 2000 simulation game Boku no Natsuyasumi (lit. 'My Summer Vacation') and its 2002 sequel Boku no Natsuyasumi 2. Ayabe stated that inspiration for Bokura no Kazoku came from the birth of his first child, which occurred shortly after development on the first Boku no Natsuyasumi concluded. He said that he did not see Bokura no Kazoku as a "big departure" from Boku no Natsuyasumi and that the two games had many similarities, with the exception of the urban setting of Bokura no Kazoku compared to the rural setting of Boku no Natsuyasumi.

The game was developed over the course of roughly three years. Ayabe and Millennium Kitchen spent two years on location scouting and researching local businesses and occupations throughout Koenji and Tokyo, taking approximately 25,000 reference photos to create the game's environment. Many of the locations in the game, such as the flower shop, bakery, and used bookstore, are real-life locations that exist in Koenji. The sounds used in the game are similarly taken from real-life Koenji, and were recorded throughout location scouting.

The character designs in Bokura no Kazoku are created by illustrator Mineko Ueda, who also served as the character designer on Boku no Natsuyasumi. As in that game, the visual style of Bokura no Kazoku is characterized by a juxtaposition of Ueda's cartoonish character designs against realistic pre-rendered backgrounds.

== Release and reception ==
Bokura no Kazoku was published by Sony Computer Entertainment and released on the PlayStation 2 on March 24, 2005. Despite a marketing push from Sony, Bokura no Kazoku received mixed reviews from critics, and the game underperformed in sales. Critic Ray Barnholt praised the game for its avoidance of micromanagement but noted that "the hands-off approach doesn't accomplish much as a game" and criticized the game's swift pacing. Reflecting on the critical reaction to the game, Ayabe stated that he wished Bokura no Kazoku to communicate a feeling of "living your life in fast-forward", stating that "I had my childhood, grew up, and the next thing I knew I was 40 [...] People would play [Bokura no Kazoku] and ask me why it was so short, and I was kind of frustrated that they didn't get what I was trying to express."
