= Shin-chan: Me and the Professor on Summer Vacation =

2021 video game

Shin-chan: Me and the Professor on Summer Vacation – The Endless Seven-Day Journey
- Japanese Nintendo Switch box art
- Developers: Neos; Millennium Kitchen; Star Factory
- Publisher: Neos
- Producer: Akira Nagashima
- Designer: Kaz Ayabe
- Writer: Kaz Ayabe
- Composer: Noisycroak
- Series: Crayon Shin-chan by Yoshito Usui
- Platforms: Nintendo Switch; PlayStation 4; Windows; Nintendo Switch 2
- Release: July 15, 2021: Nintendo Switch; JP: July 15, 2021; AS: May 4, 2022; WW: August 11, 2022; PlayStation 4; WW: August 25, 2022; Windows; WW: August 31, 2022; Android; WW: July 23, 2025; iOS; WW: August 6, 2025; Nintendo Switch 2; WW: March 4, 2027
- Genres: Adventure, simulation
- Mode: Single-player

Shin-chan: Me and the Professor on Summer Vacation – The Endless Seven-Day Journey (Note: Stylized as Shin-chan: Me and the Professor on Summer Vacation -The Endless Seven-Day Journey-. Released in Japan as Crayon Shin-chan: Ora to Hakase no Natsuyasumi ~ Owaranai Nanokakan no Tabi (クレヨンしんちゃん 「オラと博士の夏休み」〜おわらない七日間の旅〜; lit. "Crayon Shin-chan: Me and the Professor's Summer Vacation – Unending Seven-day Trip") and shortened as Ora Natsu (オラ夏)) is a 2021 adventure game developed by Neos, Millennium Kitchen, and Star Factory, and designed and written by Kaz Ayabe. Based on the manga and anime series Crayon Shin-chan, the game has been described as a spiritual successor to the video game series Boku no Natsuyasumi ('My Summer Vacation'), directed by Ayabe and developed by Millennium Kitchen. Like Boku no Natsuyasumi, Me and the Professor on Summer Vacation follows the player character as he spends his summer vacation in an open-ended environment with few set gameplay goals or obligations.

Planning for Me and the Professor on Summer Vacation began in 2018, when Neos producer Akira Nagashima conceived of a game concept combining elements from Crayon Shin-chan and Boku no Natsuyasumi, and formally approached Ayabe about developing the project in 2019. Much of the development team for Ayabe's previous title, 2013's Attack of the Friday Monsters! A Tokyo Tale, returned to develop Me and the Professor on Summer Vacation. The graphic style of the game is distinguished by its juxtaposition of the two-dimensional and deformed designs of the Crayon Shin-chan characters with detailed, hand-drawn backgrounds.

Me and the Professor on Summer Vacation was released in Japan for the Nintendo Switch on July 15, 2021, and worldwide for Switch, PlayStation 4, and Windows in August 2022. A port for Nintendo Switch 2 is set to come out on March 4, 2027. The game received generally favorable reviews from critics who, while broadly assessing the title as less strong than entries in the Boku no Natsuyasumi series, praised Me and the Professor on Summer Vacation for its visual style, atmosphere, and adaptation of the Crayon Shin-chan source material.

A stand-alone sequel video game, Shin-chan: Shiro and the Coal Town, was released on October 23, 2024.

== Plot ==
Like other entries in the Crayon Shin-chan series, Me and the Professor on Summer Vacation follows the comedic and often surreal adventures of five-year-old Shinnosuke Nohara (the titular "Shin-chan") and his family: father Hiroshi, mother Misae, younger sister Himawari, and the family dog Shiro. When Hiroshi goes on a week-long business trip to Kyushu, the rest of the family travels with him to vacation at the home of Misae's childhood friend in rural "Asso", Kumamoto. Upon arriving at Kumamoto Station, the family is approached by Dr. Akuno, a mad scientist who gives Shinnosuke a camera that produces illustrations rather than photographs. Shortly after the Nohara family's arrival in Asso, Akuno reappears with a dinosaur he claims to have extracted from the past using time travel. When Shinnosuke witnesses Akuno summoning a dinosaur at his laboratory, Akuno puts Shinnosuke in a time loop that endlessly repeats the seven days of his vacation.

== Gameplay ==
The gameplay of Me and the Professor on Summer Vacation is similar to that Boku no Natsuyasumi (lit. 'My Summer Vacation'), a video game series previously developed by Millennium Kitchen and directed by Kaz Ayabe. In both games, the player controls a young boy – Boku in Boku no Natsuyasumi, Shinnosuke in Me and the Professor on Summer Vacation – in an open-ended environment as he goes on summer vacation. Me and the Professor on Summer Vacation differs both in its inclusion of characters from the Crayon Shin-chan series and in its inclusion of surreal elements such as dinosaurs, contrasting the more realist Boku no Natsuyasumi.

While the gameplay of Me and the Professor on Summer Vacation is loosely framed by Shinnosuke's quest to fill his vacation journal with pictures and search for interesting stories to print in the local newspaper, the player is generally free to spend their time as they see fit, with few set goals or obligations. The open-ended, laid-back nature of the gameplay was designed in order to appeal to a wide audience, from child-aged Shin-chan fans to adult fans of Boku no Natsuyasumi. The game includes an achievement system based on activities such as catching insects, fishing, growing vegetables, and running errands for the townspeople. Time passes from day to night, with certain activities and events exclusive to specific times of the day.

== Development ==
=== Production ===
Planning for Me and the Professor on Summer Vacation began in September 2018 when Neos, who had previously developed the mobile game Crayon Shin-chan: Otetsudai Daisakusen (クレヨンしんちゃん お手伝い大作戦) for iOS and Android, began developing a Crayon Shin-chan game for the home console market. Neos producer Akira Nagashima conceived of a game concept combining elements from Crayon Shin-chan and Boku no Natsuyasumi, and in February 2019 formally approached Boku no Natsuyasumi director Kaz Ayabe about developing the project. Ayabe and Millennium Kitchen had previously also developed Attack of the Friday Monsters! A Tokyo Tale, which was originally released in the compilation Guild02, for Nintendo 3DS; the Shin-chan concept was seen as congruent with Attack of the Friday Monsters, as both are based on an existing media property and combine mundane and fantastical elements. Ayabe agreed to take on the project, citing his affection for the Shin-chan series, the series' compatibility with fantasy elements, and his interest in combining Shin-chan with a summer vacation concept.

The working title of the game was Ora no Natsuyasumi (オラの夏休み); Ayabe initially opposed using the word natsuyasumi in the title, as he did not wish the game to be seen as a direct continuation of the Boku no Natsuyasumi series. The final title was chosen to differentiate the game from Boku no Natsuyasumi, though when the first trailer for Me and the Professor on Summer Vacation was released, fans began referring to the game as "Ora Natsu" (オラ夏). Ayabe stated in an interview with Famitsu that after seeing the fan reaction, he is fine with the game being called Ora Natsu.

The game was developed by much of the same production staff of Attack of the Friday Monsters. Shin-chan publisher Futabasha and other companies involved in the original series' production also supervised the development of the game's plot, setting, and characters. Shin-Ei Animation, the animation studio that produces the Shin-chan anime series, provided input on character modeling. Shin-Ei also designed the original characters in the game on the basis of rough drawings produced by the development team, with producer Akira Nagashima creating the design of Dr. Akuno. The outbreak of the COVID-19 pandemic in Japan required the project to shift to entirely remote work; this workflow meant that Ayabe was directly in charge of the game's script and sound, but certain other elements such as the user interface were handled by the developer Star Factory, with Ayabe overseeing post-creation approvals.

=== Setting ===
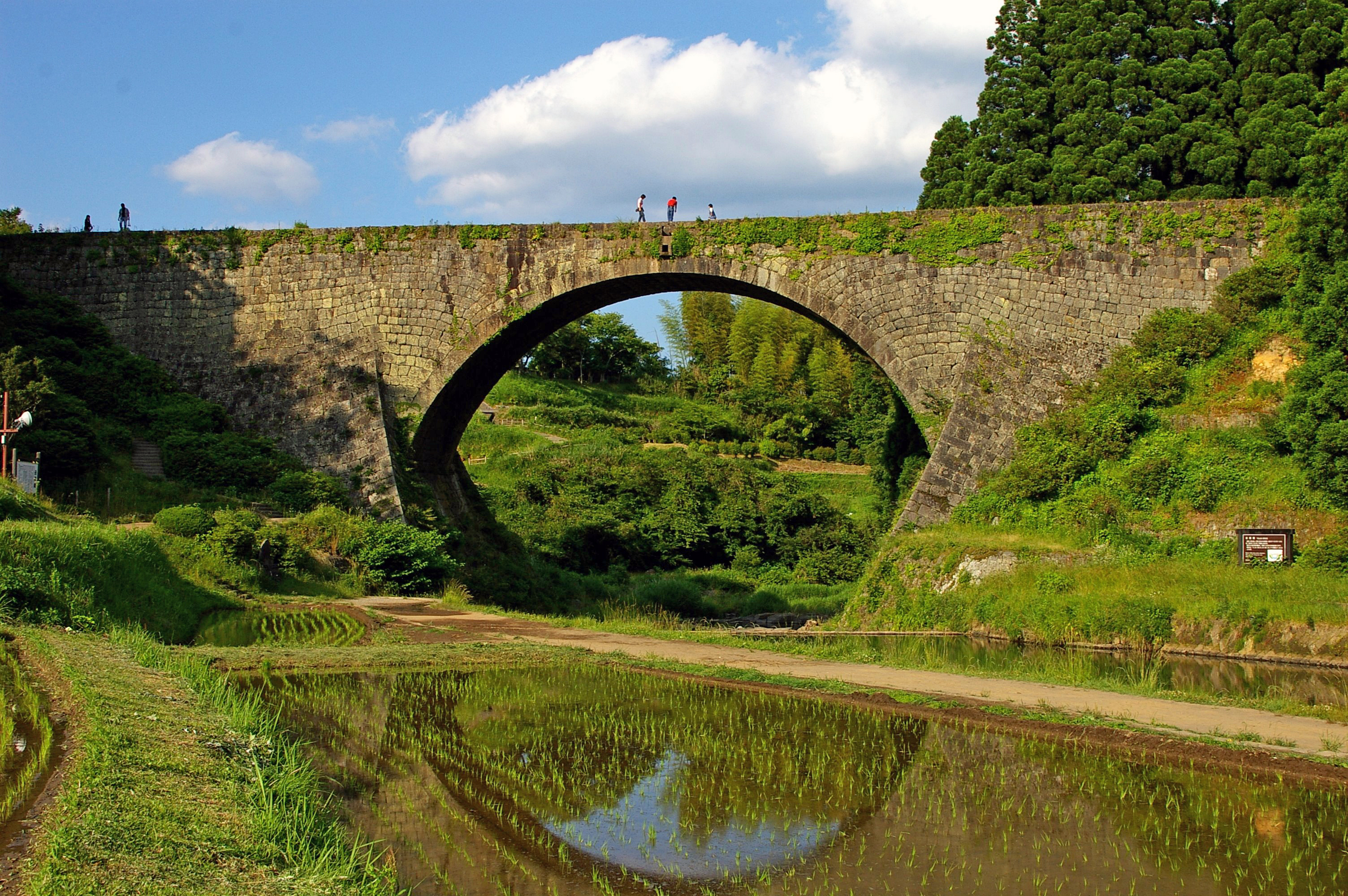
The appearance of the "Tsuntsun Bridge" in the game is based on the Tsūjun Bridge (pictured).

From the outset, the Neos side of the development team sought a work that resembled a traditional Boku no Natsuyasumi game, while Ayabe wished to avoid making another Boku no Natsuyasumi; Ayabe sought to differentiate the work by adding unusual elements, for example, initially proposing that the Nohara family go on vacation to a space colony rather than a rural setting. Later, Ayabe focused on the fact that Misae is from Kumamoto. As Misae's parents have already appeared in the source material and the concept did not naturally lend itself to the integration of unusual elements, the setting of a town where Misae's childhood friend lives was chosen. Ayabe travelled to Kumamoto for a week in fall 2019 for location scouting, drawing particular inspiration from the Tsūjun Bridge and the Kuma River for the game's environments.

Ayabe stated that in contrast to his previous works, which focus on original characters and settings, some difficulties arose from the lack of creative freedom inherent to creating a game adapted from an existing work. While Boku in Boku no Natsuyasumi is positioned as an avatar of the player, Shinnosuke is an existing and independent character, so Ayabe believed that a third-person perspective was necessary; Ayabe therefore added a female narrator to the game to evoke the feeling of a mother or teacher reading a story to a child. Further, there was tension between Shinnosuke being a five year old who should not be left to wander unsupervised, and the reality that the game would be uninteresting if he was constantly supervised by adults; to reflect this, certain surreal elements such as a bamboo periscope monitoring Shinnosuke when he travels near open water were added. In addition, as Shinnosuke in the original series is not interested in keeping living things even when he catches them, the magical illustration-producing camera mechanic was conceived, which created a gameplay flow where Shinnosuke catches bugs and fish for his picture diary and then releases them, or catches them as part of a specific request for a townsperson.

=== Graphics ===
The game juxtaposes the two-dimensional and deformed designs of the Shin-chan characters against detailed hand-drawn backgrounds.

A key principle in developing the graphics of Me and the Professor on Summer Vacation was avoiding a sense of incongruity between the Crayon Shin-chan visual style and the in-game environment. To preserve the distinctive two-dimensional and deformed look of the Shin-chan characters, each character has multiple in-game models that display depending on which angle the character is viewed from, rather than the typical approach of creating a single three-dimensional model for each character. This ensures, for example, that Shinnosuke's characteristic cheek bulge always faces outwards, regardless of what angle he is viewed from.

The in-game models were created by Star Factory; Ayabe recalled in an interview with IGN Japan that the significant height differences between the adult and child characters created challenges when staging scenes, resulting in scenes being shot from a lower camera angle than Boku no Natsuyasumi. Further, as the characters' distinctive animation-like movement style was lost at a high frame rate, the frame rate was lowered by using limited animation.

The game backgrounds were created in 3D, then drawn in 2D after the camera layout was set. As with Boku no Natsuyasumi and Attack of the Friday Monsters, Ayabe personally directed the screen and camera layouts, which Ayabe stated was a decision made in part because of the scale of production, but also to better determine which elements needed to be displayed on-screen simultaneously. Initially, it was assumed that the backgrounds would be a simple design that resembled the backgrounds of the Shin-chan television anime, but the backgrounds submitted by the art team Convoy was more realistic than Ayabe had expected, as were the effects produced by Star Factory.

=== Audio ===
The voice cast of the Crayon Shin-chan animated series reprise their roles in Me and the Professor on Summer Vacation, alongside a cast of new voice actors performing the original characters. The soundtrack to Me and the Professor on Summer Vacation is composed by the production company Noisycroak, which also composed the soundtrack to Attack of the Friday Monsters. The game's theme song "Spinning Round the Milky Way" (まわる僕らと銀河系, Mawaru Bokura to Gingakei) is arranged and performed by Sacco Saito, with lyrics by Kaz Ayabe and music by Eijo Sakamoto. Saito was not informed of the content of the game until after the theme song had been arranged and recorded.

== Release ==
Me and the Professor on Summer Vacation was announced in a Nintendo Direct on February 18, 2021. The game was released in Japan on Nintendo Switch on July 15, 2021, in both a standard edition and a special edition containing a 60-page companion book, a notepad modeled after Shinnosuke's journal that appears in the game, and a code for a digital download of the game's soundtrack. It is the first home console game by publisher Neos, and the first three-dimensional Shin-chan video game since 2006's Crayon Shin-chan: Saikyou Kazoku Kasukabe King Wii. Prior to the game's release, a "pre-experience session" was held in Tokyo for video game distributors to play the game from June 26 to 27, 2021.

The game was released in Taiwan, Hong Kong, and South Korea on May 4, 2022, with each release featuring a re-dubbed script performed by the voice cast of the localized Crayon Shin-chan animated series of each respective country. On June 28, 2022, it was announced that the game would be released worldwide for Nintendo Switch and PlayStation 4. This was followed by an announcement that the game will also release on Windows, with a Steam release announced on August 4, 2022 and an Epic Games Store release announced on August 8, 2022. The worldwide release supports English, Spanish, German, Portuguese, Japanese, Korean, Simplified Chinese, and Traditional Chinese language options. Me and the Professor on Summer Vacation was released worldwide digitally for Switch on August 11, 2022, PS4 on August 25, 2022. and Steam on August 31, 2022. A physical Switch and PS4 release for North America is slated for release through Limited Run Games, in both standard and collector's editions. A port for Nintendo Switch 2 is set to release on March 4, 2027. Its physical release is set to be distributed by Clear River Games as a double pack with its sequel, Shin-chan: Shiro and the Coal Town.

== Reception ==
Reception

Aggregate score
| Aggregator | Score |
|---|---|
| Metacritic | NS: 79/100 |

Review scores
| Publication | Score |
|---|---|
| Destructoid | 7.5/10 |
| Famitsu | 32/40 (7/8/8/9) |
| Nintendo Life | 8/10 |
| TouchArcade | 4/5 |

Me and the Professor on Summer Vacation received "generally favorable reviews" from critics, according to review aggregator Metacritic. It has shipped 400,000 units worldwide as of June 2022.

4Gamer.net praised the "Japanese summeriness" and "Crayon Shin-chan-ness" of the game, while Famitsu called it "a masterpiece that both adults and children can enjoy". IGN Japan critic Takuya Watanabe gave the game three scores: an 8 out of 10 when evaluated as a Crayon Shin-chan game for children, a 7 out of 10 as a spiritual successor to Boku no Natsuyasumi, and a 5 out of 10 as an original adventure game. While acknowledging the charm of the game, Watanabe wrote that he felt there was a gap between the scale of the project and what it achieved. Adesh Thapliyal of Polygon surmised Me and the Professor on Summer Vacation as an "ersatz sequel" to Boku no Natsuyasumi that is "My Summer Vacation 5 in all but name and with a Shin-chan coat of paint". Thapliyal noted that while Me and the Professor on Summer Vacation has "less of an emphasis on naturalism" compared to Boku no Natsuyasumi, it is "remarkably accurate to its cartoon and manga source material", and praised its writing and visual style.

Shaun Musgrave of TouchArcade called the game a "fantastic adaptation" of Crayon Shin-chan, but wrote that while the game "absolutely scratches that Bokunatsu itch [...] it wasn't quite as enjoyable for me as any of the games from that series." Roland Ingram of Nintendo Life wrote that while the game occasionally "trade[s]-off of playability in favour of atmosphere", the surreal elements are "clever turn for the Bokunatsu concept" and praised its "top-class" backgrounds and 3D models.
