= Boku no Natsuyasumi 4 =

2009 video game

- Developer: Millennium Kitchen (Note: Additional work by Japan Studio.)
- Publisher: Sony Computer Entertainment
- Director: Kaz Ayabe
- Platform: PlayStation Portable
- Release: JP: July 2, 2009
- Genre: Adventure
- Mode: Single-player

Boku no Natsuyasumi 4 (Note: Japanese: ぼくのなつやすみ4 瀬戸内少年探偵団「ボクと秘密の地図」, Hepburn: Boku no Natsuyasumi 4: Setouchi Shounen Tanteidan "Boku to Himitsu no Chizu"; lit. "My Summer Vacation 4: Boy’s Inland Detective Club, 'Me and the Secret Map' ") is a 2009 adventure video game developed by Millennium Kitchen and published by Sony Computer Entertainment for the PlayStation Portable. It is part of the Boku no Natsuyasumi series and was released only in Japan. Like Boku no Natsuyasumi 2, it takes place in a Japanese coastal village.

== Gameplay ==
The main character spends his summer vacation in a coastal village in Japan. The game contains the familiar bug collecting, beetle fighting, swimming, fishing, morning exercises, and family meals from previous series entries, but also features new activities, such as playing a taiko drum, challenging other children to duels with mechanical toys, a beetle circus, and several tabletop games. Unlike other games in the series, which take place in the year 1975, this installment takes place in the summer of 1985.

== Reception ==
Popular Japanese review magazine Famitsu rated the game a 31 out of 40 (8/8/8/7).
