= Guild (video game series) =

The Guild series (ギルドシリーズ, Girudo Shirīzu) is a compilation of video games produced by Level-5 for the Nintendo 3DS in cooperation with various game designers. The first compilation, Guild01 (ギルド01, Girudo Zero Wan), consists of four games and was released at retail in Japan on May 31, 2012. Three of the titles have been announced for individual release on the Nintendo eShop in Western territories during Fall 2012. All four of them were released individually on the Japanese eShop not long after. A second compilation, Guild02 (ギルド02, Girudo Zero Tsū), which features three games designed by Keiji Inafune, Kazuya Asano, Takemaru Abiko and Kaz Ayabe, was released on the Nintendo eShop in Japan during March 2013 and began releasing in Western territories in May 2013.

== Guild01 ==
Guild01
- Developers: Level-5; Grasshopper Manufacture (Liberation Maiden); Vivarium Inc. (Aero Porter); Nex Entertainment (Weapon Shop de Omasse, Crimson Shroud)
- Publisher: Level-5
- Designers: Goichi Suda (Liberation Maiden); Yoshiyuki Hirai (Rental Bukiya de Omasse); Yoot Saito (Aero Porter); Yasumi Matsuno (Crimson Shroud)
- Composer: Basiscape (Crimson Shroud)
- Platform: Nintendo 3DS
- Release: As Guild01: JP: May 31, 2012; Nintendo eShop: EU: October 4, 2012; NA: October 25, 2012; JP: November 14, 2012
- Genre: Video game compilation

Guild01 was released as a compilation for Nintendo 3DS in Japan on May 31, 2012, and consists of four completely distinct games, designed by Goichi Suda, Yoot Saito, Yasumi Matsuno and Yoshiyuki Hirai of comedy duo America Zarigani. The game was bundled with a playable demo of Level-5's game, Time Travelers. They were later released on the Nintendo eShop in late 2012, with the exception of 'Weapon Shop de Omasse,' which was released in February 2014.

=== Aero Porter ===
Aero Porter (エアロポーター, Earo Pōtā) is a simulation game directed by Yoot Saito. The player is in charge of an airport, and their goal is to manage baggage quickly and ensure that the airplanes are able to depart on time. If the player is successful, their airport's rating will grow, gaining them more money and passengers as well as allowing them to purchase new airplanes and expand their airport. The game was released in North America, Europe and Australasia on November 29, 2012, and individually in Japan on December 5, 2012. It received a 70 on Metacritic.

=== Crimson Shroud ===
Crimson Shroud (クリムゾンシュラウド, Kurimuzon Shuraudo) is a traditional adventure RPG created by Yasumi Matsuno, developed internally at Level-5 alongside Nex Entertainment. The player is a "Chaser", someone who is an expert at searching for people. The game is set 1,000 years in the past in a world without magic, and the story details how magic became commonplace in its world. The game was released on the Nintendo eShop in Japan on November 28, 2012, and in North America, Europe and Australasia on December 13, 2012. The game features music by Hitoshi Sakimoto's company, Basiscape, with music from him, Mitsuhiro Kaneda, Azusa Chiba, Kimihiro Abe, and Masaharu Iwata. It received a 76 on Metacritic.

=== Weapon Shop de Omasse ===
Weapon Shop de Omasse (レンタル武器屋 de オマッセ, Rentaru Bukiya de Omasse; lit. Omasse's Rental Weapon Shop) is a fantasy rhythm RPG written by Yoshiyuki Hirai, in which the main characters are a father and son pair who craft weapons for heroes. The player uses rhythmic gameplay to forge weapons which are rented by heroes for their quests; the weapon chosen will affect whether or not the hero is successful. The game was released individually on the Japanese Nintendo eShop on November 21, 2012. Originally, this was the only title not to be announced for Western release, with the publisher citing the high degree of translation required and debatable audience size for the game for a localization to be produced. In January 2014, a classification of the game was posted by the Australian Classification Board under the title, Weapon Shop de Omasse, suggesting that the game would receive a localization. The game was released on February 20, 2014, after the announcement during a Nintendo Direct on February 13, 2014. It received a 63 on Metacritic.

== Guild02 ==
Guild02
- Developers: Level-5; Millennium Kitchen and Aquria (Attack of the Friday Monsters!); Comcept and Natsume Atari (Bugs vs. Tanks)
- Publisher: Level-5
- Designers: Keiji Inafune (Bugs vs. Tanks); Kaz Ayabe (Attack of the Friday Monsters!); Kazuya Asano, Takemaru Abiko (The Starship Damrey)
- Platform: Nintendo 3DS
- Release: JP: March 13, 2013; NA: May 16, 2013; EU: May 16, 2013; AU: May 16, 2013
- Genre: Video game compilation

A follow-up title, titled Guild02, was announced on May 24, 2012. The compilation features three games designed by Keiji Inafune, Kazuya Asano, Takemaru Abiko and Kaz Ayabe. The compilation has not been announced for a retail release. These games were released on the Nintendo eShop in Japan in March 2013, and in North America, Europe and Australasia in May 2013. Each Guild02 game has bonus content which can be accessed if save data for any Guild01 game is detected.

=== Attack of the Friday Monsters! ===
Attack of the Friday Monsters! (怪獣が出る金曜日, Kaijū ga Deru Kinyōbi; lit. The Friday When Monsters Appear) is a life simulation game designed by Kaz Ayabe, who is known in Japan for the popular Boku no Natsuyasumi series. The game follows a boy named Sohta who lives in a town where monsters and superheroes from 1970s tokusatsu shows appear every Friday. The game was released in Japan on March 13, 2013, and in North America, Europe and Australasia on July 18, 2013. It received a 77 on Metacritic.

=== Bugs vs. Tanks! ===
Bugs vs. Tanks! (虫けら戦車, Mushikera Sensha) is a tank action game designed by Keiji Inafune. The game sees players take the role of various World War II tanks piloted by Nazi soldiers that have been shrunk down to miniature size in order to fight against various bugs and insects. The game was released in Japan on March 19, 2013, and in North America, Europe and Australasia on June 20, 2013. It received a 50 on Metacritic.

=== The Starship Damrey ===
The Starship Damrey (宇宙船ダムレイ号, Uchūsen Damurei-gō) is a first-person perspective survival horror game designed by Kazuya Asano and Takemaru Abiko. The game throws players into a suspenseful environment with no tutorials or hints to guide them. The game was released in Japan on March 27, 2013, and in North America, Europe and Australasia on May 16, 2013. It received a 58 on Metacritic.

== Reception ==
Famitsu gave Guild01 a score of 34/40. In an import review, ComputerAndVideoGames.com gave the game a score of 7.5, saying that whilst the individual games have a lot of charm, the differences between them are too great for them to work as a single package.
