= Kaz Ayabe =

Japanese video game developer

- 綾部 和弘
- Born: Kazuhiro Ayabe; 1965 (age 60–61); Hokkaido, Japan
- Occupation: Video game developer
- Notable work: Boku no Natsuyasumi
- Title: Founder of Millennium Kitchen

Kazuhiro "Kaz" Ayabe (綾部 和弘, Ayabe Kazuhiro; born 1965) is a Japanese video game developer. He is the founder of the video game company Millennium Kitchen and is best known as the creator of the video game series Boku no Natsuyasumi.

== Biography ==
Ayabe was born in 1965 in Hokkaido as the youngest of three children. He was interested in design from a young age, developing a hobby of drawing maps of imaginary towns as a child, and eventually moved to Tokyo to study animation at Tokyo Designer Gakuin College. After graduating, he took a job as a graphic artist at the video game developer NMK, later becoming a programmer for the company. He worked on several titles for the company, including Psychic 5 (1987), Esper Boukentai (1987), and Rolan's Curse II (1992), before resigning from the company in the early 1990s. He worked as a freelancer for six months before being hired as a designer and project manager at K-Idea, a game design planning company founded by Shōnen Jump games columnist Hajime Kimura.

In 1997, Ayabe resigned from K-Idea to establish the game studio Millennium Kitchen. There, Ayabe would direct, write, and design the video game Boku no Natsuyasumi (2000), which won a New Wave Award at the fifth Japan Game Awards, and was a finalist for the Excellence Award at the third Japan Media Arts Festival. Since then, Boku no Natsuyasumi 2 (2002) and Bokura no Kazoku (2005) were selected as juror-recommended works at the Japan Media Arts Festival, and Attack of the Friday Monsters! A Tokyo Tale (2015) was selected as an honorable mention for Best Narrative at the Game Developers Choice Awards.

Since 2014, Ayabe has been the proprietor of "Kasei Curry" (Mars Curry), a Japanese curry restaurant located in Ikebukuro, Tokyo.

== Works ==
Year	Game	Credit(s)	Ref(s)
1987	Psychic 5	Programmer	
1987	Esper Boukentai	Programmer	
1992	Rolan's Curse II	Programmer, sound	
1993	Jungle Wars 2	System assistance	
2000	Boku no Natsuyasumi	Director, writer, game designer	
2002	Boku no Natsuyasumi 2	Director, writer, game designer	
2005	Bokura no Kazoku	Director, writer, game designer	
2007	Boku no Natsuyasumi 3	Director, writer, game designer	
2009	Boku no Natsuyasumi 4	Director, writer, game designer	
2013	Attack of the Friday Monsters! A Tokyo Tale	Director, writer, game designer	
2021	Shin-chan: Me and the Professor on Summer Vacation	Game designer, writer	
2023	Natsu-Mon! 20th Century Summer Vacation	Game designer, writer	
2024	Shin-chan: Shiro and the Coal Town	Supervisor	
