= Attack of the Friday Monsters! A Tokyo Tale =

2013 video game

- Developers: Millennium Kitchen and Aquria
- Publisher: Level-5
- Designer: Kaz Ayabe
- Series: Guild
- Platform: Nintendo 3DS
- Release: JP: March 13, 2013; WW: July 18, 2013
- Genre: Adventure game
- Mode: Single-player

Attack of the Friday Monsters! A Tokyo Tale (怪獣が出る金曜日, Kaijū ga Deru Kinyōbi; lit. The Friday When Monsters Appear) is an adventure game designed by Kaz Ayabe, who is known in Japan for the popular Boku no Natsuyasumi series. The game was released for Nintendo 3DS in Japan on March 13, 2013, as part of the Guild02 compilation, and separately as a digital download in North America, Europe and Australasia on July 18, 2013. It follows a boy named Sohta, who lives in a town where monsters and superheroes from 1970s tokusatsu shows appear every Friday.

== Gameplay ==
In the game, the player explores the town which the protagonist Sohta has just moved to, with gameplay consisting of speaking to NPCs to progress the plot and playing card battles against other residents. Sohta must collect "glims", energy shards that allow him to magically obtain new cards.

== Plot ==
The game's plot is structured in 26 episodes and takes place in 1971 in Setagaya, Tokyo, in the suburb of Fuji no Hana. It starts with ten-year old Sohta, who has recently moved into town and whose parents own a dry-cleaning shop, being sent on an errand but forgetting about it. As he ventures through town, he meets various classmates, against whom he plays a trading-card game called "Monster Cards", and other residents. The episodes are non-linear and involve individual quests.

The overarching story of the game is presented in a magic realist manner, and involves the sudden and inexplicable appearance of massive fictional superheroes and kaiju that battle every Friday outside of town. As a tokusatsu show is also filmed in the same town, it is unclear whether it is a supernatural phenomenon or a giant hoax orchestrated by the townspeople.

== Reception ==
Reception

Aggregate score
| Aggregator | Score |
|---|---|
| Metacritic | 77/100 |

Review scores
| Publication | Score |
|---|---|
| Destructoid | 9/10 |
| Edge | 7/10 |
| Eurogamer | 8/10 |
| GameZone | 8/10 |
| Hardcore Gamer | 4.5/5 |
| IGN | 6.2/10 |
| Nintendo Life | 8/10 |
| Nintendo World Report | 8.5/10 |
| Official Nintendo Magazine | 86% |
| Pocket Gamer | 4/5 |
| Polygon | 8/10 |
| Metro | 8/10 |

The game received "generally favorable reviews" according to the review aggregation website Metacritic.

Jonathan Holmes of Destructoid praised the game for its relaxing gameplay and "beautiful artwork". Comparing it to work by Studio Ghibli, he also called the card minigame "surprisingly gripping", saying it was a good example of a short yet fun narrative game. Lee Meyer of Nintendo Life called it "a lovely, memorable experience" that resembled a classic coming-of-age film. Comparing the episodes to the Professor Layton series in how they are structured, he also called the game "visually and aurally pleasing". Griffin McElroy of Polygon called its writing, narration, art, and sound design "superb", but criticized the glim collecting as "needlessly repetitive".
