= Boku no Natsuyasumi 3 =

2007 video game

- Developer(s): Millennium Kitchen (Note: Additional work by Japan Studio.)
- Publisher(s): Sony Computer Entertainment
- Platform(s): PlayStation 3
- Release: JP: July 5, 2007
- Genre(s): Adventure
- Mode(s): Single-player

Boku no Natsuyasumi 3: Kitaguni Hen: Chiisana Boku no Dai Sougen (Note: Japanese: ぼくのなつやすみ3 -北国篇- 小さなボクの大草原, Hepburn: Boku no Natsuyasumi 3: Kitaguni Hen: Chiisana Boku no Dai Sougen; lit. "My Summer Vacation 3: The Northern Chapter: Little Boku's Big Prairie") is a 2007 adventure video game developed by Millennium Kitchen and published by Sony Computer Entertainment for the PlayStation 3. It is part of the Boku no Natsuyasumi series and was released only in Japan on July 5, 2007.

Developer Kaz Ayabe has said that the Boku no Natsuyasumi series were based on his own experiences, through volume 3, which started to incorporate the experiences of others.

== Gameplay ==
The game involves a boy's summer vacation on his aunt and uncle's farm in the wide-open countryside of Hokkaidō. Features from previous series entries, like catching a large variety of insects, a popular pastime in Japan, and swimming return, along with new activities, such as grass sledding, cow milking, and Chinese jump rope.
