= List of Umineko When They Cry titles =

Japanese series logo

The Umineko When They Cry visual novel series is produced by the Japanese dōjin soft maker 07th Expansion, and are playable on Microsoft Windows PCs. The games take place on the fictional Japanese island Rokkenjima. The head of a wealthy family named Kinzo Ushiromiya, who lives on and owns Rokkenjima, is near death, and eight of his family members arrive on the island to discuss how Kinzo's assets will be divided once he is dead. Also on the island are three family members who live there, five of Kinzo's servants, and his personal physician at the beginning of the story. After the eight family members arrive, a typhoon traps them on the island and shortly after people start to get mysteriously murdered.

Umineko When They Cry is a series of murder mystery visual novels that requires relatively little player interaction as most of the gameplay is composed of reading text which signifies either dialogue between characters or the inner thoughts of the protagonist who the player assumes. The games use intermissions where the player can obtain several tips which allow the player to read various supplementary information that may or may not be useful in solving the mystery. The series debuted in Japan in August 2007 with Legend of the Golden Witch, the first in the series of eight games, ending with Twilight of the Golden Witch in December 2010. The first four games share the title Umineko no Naku Koro ni, but the fifth through eighth games have the common title Umineko no Naku Koro ni Chiru. An additional fandisc titled Umineko no Naku Koro ni Tsubasa was released in December 2010, and a second fandisc titled Umineko no Naku Koro ni Hane was released in December 2011.

The Umineko no Naku Koro ni Saku collection of prior content and the new episode 9 was released in October 2019. 07th Expansion released a dōjin fighting game titled Ougon Musou Kyoku in December 2010 and an expansion of it titled Ōgon Musōkyoku Cross in December 2011. Alchemist released PlayStation 3 ports of the eight main games, PlayStation Portable ports of the first four games, and an Xbox 360 port of Ougon Musou Kyoku in 2010 and 2011.

== Main series ==
Title	Details
Umineko no Naku Koro ni Episode 1: Legend of the Golden Witch Original release date(s): JP: August 17, 2007; WW: July 8, 2016	Release years by system: 2007—Microsoft Windows PC
Umineko no Naku Koro ni Episode 1: Legend of the Golden Witch Original release date(s): JP: August 17, 2007; WW: July 8, 2016	Notes: Published and developed by 07th Expansion; English localization by MangaGamer
Umineko no Naku Koro ni Episode 2: Turn of the Golden Witch Original release date(s): JP: December 31, 2007; WW: July 8, 2016	Release years by system: 2007—Microsoft Windows PC
Umineko no Naku Koro ni Episode 2: Turn of the Golden Witch Original release date(s): JP: December 31, 2007; WW: July 8, 2016	Notes: Published and developed by 07th Expansion; English localization by MangaGamer
Umineko no Naku Koro ni Episode 3: Banquet of the Golden Witch Original release date(s): JP: August 16, 2008; WW: July 8, 2016	Release years by system: 2008—Microsoft Windows PC
Umineko no Naku Koro ni Episode 3: Banquet of the Golden Witch Original release date(s): JP: August 16, 2008; WW: July 8, 2016	Notes: Published and developed by 07th Expansion; English localization by MangaGamer
Umineko no Naku Koro ni Episode 4: Alliance of the Golden Witch Original release date(s): JP: December 29, 2008; WW: July 8, 2016	Release years by system: 2008—Microsoft Windows PC
Umineko no Naku Koro ni Episode 4: Alliance of the Golden Witch Original release date(s): JP: December 29, 2008; WW: July 8, 2016	Notes: Published and developed by 07th Expansion; English localization by MangaGamer

=== Chiru ===
Title	Details
Umineko no Naku Koro ni Chiru Episode 5: End of the Golden Witch Original release date(s): JP: August 15, 2009; WW: November 17, 2017	Release years by system: 2009—Microsoft Windows PC
Umineko no Naku Koro ni Chiru Episode 5: End of the Golden Witch Original release date(s): JP: August 15, 2009; WW: November 17, 2017	Notes: Published and developed by 07th Expansion; English localization by MangaGamer
Umineko no Naku Koro ni Chiru Episode 6: Dawn of the Golden Witch Original release date(s): JP: December 30, 2009; WW: November 17, 2017	Release years by system: 2009—Microsoft Windows PC
Umineko no Naku Koro ni Chiru Episode 6: Dawn of the Golden Witch Original release date(s): JP: December 30, 2009; WW: November 17, 2017	Notes: Published and developed by 07th Expansion; English localization by MangaGamer
Umineko no Naku Koro ni Chiru Episode 7: Requiem of the Golden Witch Original release date(s): JP: August 14, 2010; WW: November 17, 2017	Release years by system: 2010—Microsoft Windows PC
Umineko no Naku Koro ni Chiru Episode 7: Requiem of the Golden Witch Original release date(s): JP: August 14, 2010; WW: November 17, 2017	Notes: Published and developed by 07th Expansion; English localization by MangaGamer
Umineko no Naku Koro ni Chiru Episode 8: Twilight of the Golden Witch Original release date(s): JP: December 31, 2010; WW: November 17, 2017	Release years by system: 2010—Microsoft Windows PC
Umineko no Naku Koro ni Chiru Episode 8: Twilight of the Golden Witch Original release date(s): JP: December 31, 2010; WW: November 17, 2017	Notes: Published and developed by 07th Expansion; English localization by MangaGamer

=== Others ===
Title	Details
Umineko no Naku Koro ni Tsubasa Original release date(s): JP: December 31, 2010	Release years by system: 2010—Microsoft Windows PC
Umineko no Naku Koro ni Tsubasa Original release date(s): JP: December 31, 2010	Notes: Published and developed by 07th Expansion
Umineko no Naku Koro ni Hane Original release date(s): JP: December 31, 2011	Release years by system: 2011—Microsoft Windows PC
Umineko no Naku Koro ni Hane Original release date(s): JP: December 31, 2011	Notes: Published and developed by 07th Expansion
Umineko no Naku Koro ni Saku Original release date(s): JP: October 4, 2019	Release years by system: 2019—Microsoft Windows PC 2021—PlayStation 4, Nintendo Switch
Umineko no Naku Koro ni Saku Original release date(s): JP: October 4, 2019	Notes: Published and developed by 07th Expansion; Console ports published by Entergram and include Ōgon Musōkyoku Cross download code

== Other games ==
=== Rondo and Nocturne ===
Title	Details
Umineko no Naku Koro ni: Majo to Suiri no Rondo Original release date(s): JP: December 16, 2010	Release years by system: 2010—PlayStation 3
Umineko no Naku Koro ni: Majo to Suiri no Rondo Original release date(s): JP: December 16, 2010	Notes: Original title: うみねこのなく頃に ～魔女と推理の輪舞曲～; Published and developed by Alchemist; Contains Episode 1 through Episode 4
Umineko no Naku Koro ni Chiru: Shinjitsu to Gensō no Nocturne Original release date(s): JP: December 15, 2011	Release years by system: 2011—PlayStation 3
Umineko no Naku Koro ni Chiru: Shinjitsu to Gensō no Nocturne Original release date(s): JP: December 15, 2011	Notes: Original title: うみねこのなく頃に ～真実と幻想の夜想曲～; Published and developed by Alchemist; Contains Episode 5 through Episode 8

=== Portable ===
Title	Details
Umineko no Naku Koro ni: Portable 1 Original release date(s): JP: October 20, 2011	Release years by system: 2011—PlayStation Portable
Umineko no Naku Koro ni: Portable 1 Original release date(s): JP: October 20, 2011	Notes: Published and developed by Alchemist; Contains Episode 1 and Episode 2
Umineko no Naku Koro ni: Portable 2 Original release date(s): JP: November 17, 2011	Release years by system: 2011—PlayStation Portable
Umineko no Naku Koro ni: Portable 2 Original release date(s): JP: November 17, 2011	Notes: Published and developed by Alchemist; Contains Episode 3 and Episode 4

=== Ōgon Musōkyoku ===
Title	Details
Ōgon Musōkyoku Original release date(s): JP: December 31, 2010	Release years by system: 2010—Microsoft Windows PC
Ōgon Musōkyoku Original release date(s): JP: December 31, 2010	Notes: Published and developed by 07th Expansion
Ōgon Musōkyoku X Original release date(s): JP: October 6, 2011	Release years by system: 2011—Xbox 360
Ōgon Musōkyoku X Original release date(s): JP: October 6, 2011	Notes: Published by Alchemist; Developed by 07th Expansion
Ōgon Musōkyoku Cross Original release date(s): JP: December 31, 2011; WW: December 8, 2017	Release years by system: 2011—Microsoft Windows PC 2021—PlayStation 4, Nintendo Switch
Ōgon Musōkyoku Cross Original release date(s): JP: December 31, 2011; WW: December 8, 2017	Notes: Published and developed by 07th Expansion; Expansion requiring the original game in the original release; English localization by MangaGamer also contains original game, was released under the name Umineko: Golden Fantasia; Console ports published by Entergram
