= Natsu-Mon: 20th Century Summer Kid =

2023 video game

- Developer(s): Millennium Kitchen; Toybox
- Publisher(s): Spike Chunsoft
- Director(s): Kaz Ayabe
- Producer(s): Shohei Sakakibara; Yasuhiro Wada
- Writer(s): Kaz Ayabe
- Composer(s): Ryo Shirasawa
- Platform(s): Nintendo Switch; Windows
- Release: Switch; JP: July 28, 2023; WW: August 6, 2024; Windows; JP: June 27, 2024; WW: August 6, 2024
- Genre(s): Adventure
- Mode(s): Single-player

Natsu-Mon: 20th Century Summer Kid (Note: Japanese: なつもん！ ２０世紀の夏休み, Hepburn: Natsu-Mon! 20 Seiki no Natsuyasumi) is an adventure game developed by Millennium Kitchen and Toybox. Spike Chunsoft first released it in Japan for the Nintendo Switch in 2023. Players control a young boy in Japan who has adventures during the summer.

== Gameplay ==
Players control Satoru, a young boy in rural Japan. Throughout August, players explore the countryside, meet non-player characters in town, and perform quests. Natsu-Mon: 20th Century Summer Kid plays similarly to Boku no Natsuyasumi but features a 3D open world map. Satoru can not be harmed, but if he runs out of stamina, he moves slower. At the end of each day, he returns home, ending that day's adventures.

== Development ==
Spike Chunsoft released it in Japan for the Nintendo Switch on July 28, 2023, and for Windows on July 27, 2024. They released it worldwide for both Windows and Switch on August 6, 2024.

== Reception ==
Natsu-Mon: 20th Century Summer Kid received positive reviews on Metacritic. PC Gamer called it "a delightful summer escape", though they said it could be repetitious. Although they felt the transition to an open world reinvigorated the Boku no Natsuyasumi formula, they also said that the maps were somewhat less fun to explore. Digitally Downloaded identified the core theme as natsukashii, a Japanese term similar to nostalgia but with a happier subtext. They particularly enjoyed the emergent narrative and said it was among the best in years. Nintendo Life found Natsu-Mon thoughtful and enjoyable, they criticized the Switch performance and said the English translation was imperfect. Though they criticized the dialogue, Nintendo World Report recommended it to fans of Animal Crossing who are looking for more cozy games. RPGamer praised its freedom and sense of nostalgia, which they said made it an excellent open world game. They experienced performance issues on the Switch but said the charming world makes up for it.
