= Mineko Ueda =

Japanese illustrator

- 上田三根子
- Born: 1949 (age 76–77); Saitama Prefecture
- Occupation: Illustrator

Mineko Ueda (上田三根子, Ueda Mineko; born 1949) is a Japanese illustrator. She is best known for her commercial illustrations, particularly the mascots for the Lion Corporation's Kirei Kirei brand of hand soap, and as the character designer for the Boku no Natsuyasumi series of video games.

== Biography ==
Ueda was born in 1949 in Saitama Prefecture. She developed an interest in illustration in her youth and was inspired by the works of Ayumi Ohashi in the magazine Heibon Punch. She later attended Setsu Mode Seminar, an art school in Tokyo; her first job out of school was for an illustration in Heibon Punch. She formally established her personal commercial illustration studio in 1988, commenting that it was not until she was in her mid-30s that she began to believe that she could have a lasting career as an illustrator.

Ueda's illustrations are distinguished by their pop art style, her depictions of fashions, and characters with cartoonishly rounded features and dot eyes. She is active in a range of fields, including advertisements, commercial products, book covers, and editorial illustrations. In 1997 she created the mascots for the Lion Corporation's Kirei Kirei brand of hand soap, and in 1998 illustrated the covers for the NHK books Oshare Kobo and Kyo no Ryori. She was the character designer for the 2000 video game Boku no Natsuyasumi, released for the PlayStation, and went on to serve as the illustrator for the game's three sequels. Ueda is a member of the Tokyo Illustrators Society.
