= Millennium Kitchen =

Japanese video game developer

Millennium Kitchen Co., Ltd.
- Native name: 株式会社ミレニアムキッチン
- Type: Limited
- Industry: Video games
- Founded: December 1, 1997
- Headquarters: Tokyo, Japan
- Key people: Kaz Ayabe
- Number of employees: 8 (As of November 2013)
- Website: Millennium Kitchen

Millennium Kitchen Co., Ltd. (Japanese: 株式会社ミレニアムキッチン) is a Japanese video game developer. Founded by Kaz Ayabe in 1997, the company is best known as the creators of the Boku no Natsuyasumi (lit. ('My Summer Vacation') series of video games.

== History ==
Millennium Kitchen was established as a limited company on December 1, 1997 by video game developer Kaz Ayabe. Ayabe, who had previously worked at the video game companies NMK and K-Idea as a programmer and a designer, founded the company in order to produce Boku no Natsuyasumi, which was released for the PlayStation in 2000. On December 1, 2013, the company became a joint-stock company.

=== Accolades ===
Boku no Natsuyasumi (2000) won a New Wave Award at the fifth Japan Game Awards, and was a finalist for the Excellence Award at the third Japan Media Arts Festival. Boku no Natsuyasumi 2 (2002) and Bokura no Kazoku (2005) were selected as juror-recommended works at the Japan Media Arts Festival, and Attack of the Friday Monsters! A Tokyo Tale (2015) was selected as an honorable mention for Best Narrative at the Game Developers Choice Awards.

== Works ==
=== As developer ===
Year	Title	Platform(s)	Notes	Ref(s)
2000	Boku no Natsuyasumi	PlayStation		
2002	Boku no Natsuyasumi 2	PlayStation 2		
2005	Bokura no Kazoku	PlayStation 2		
2006	Boku no Natsuyasumi Portable	PlayStation Portable	Port of Boku no Natsuyasumi	
2007	Boku no Natsuyasumi 3	PlayStation 3		
2009	Boku no Natsuyasumi 4	PlayStation Portable		
2010	Boku no Natsuyasumi Portable 2	PlayStation Portable	Port of Boku no Natsuyasumi 2	
2013	Attack of the Friday Monsters! A Tokyo Tale	Nintendo 3DS		
2021	Shin-chan: Me and the Professor on Summer Vacation	Nintendo Switch, PlayStation 4, Windows		
2023	Natsu-Mon: 20th Century Summer Kid	Nintendo Switch, Windows		
2024	Shin-chan: Shiro and the Coal Town	Nintendo Switch, Windows		

=== Other games ===
Year	Title	Platform(s)	Role	Ref(s)
2003	Reel Fishing III	PlayStation 2	Promotional visuals, packaging	
2004	Popolocrois: Tsuki no Okite no Bōken	PlayStation 2	Character modeling	
2008	Suzumiya Haruhi no Tomadoi	PlayStation 2	Graphics support	
2009	Magician's Quest: Mysterious Times	Nintendo DS	Character modeling, character design	
2010	Tongari Boushi to Mahou no Omise	Nintendo DS	Character modeling, map design	
