= Umineko: Golden Fantasia =

Japanese video game

Golden Fantasia
- Developer: 07th Expansion
- Publishers: JP: 07th Expansion; JP: Alchemist (Xbox 360); WW: MangaGamer; JP: Entergram (PS4, NS)
- Director: Ryukishi07
- Writer: Ryukishi07
- Series: Umineko When They Cry
- Platforms: Microsoft Windows; Xbox 360; PlayStation 4 Nintendo Switch
- Release: Windows: JP: December 31, 2010; JP: December 31, 2011 (Cross); WW: December 8, 2017 (Cross); Xbox 360: JP: October 6, 2011; PlayStation 4, Nintendo Switch: JP: January 28, 2021
- Genre: Fighting
- Modes: Single-player, multiplayer

Umineko: Golden Fantasia, known in Japan as just Golden Fantasia (黄金夢想曲, Ōgon Musōkyoku), is a 2D versus fighting game developed and published by 07th Expansion. It is a spin-off of the Umineko When They Cry murder mystery visual novel series and was originally released at Comiket 79 on December 31, 2010. The game was ported to the Xbox 360 by Alchemist in October 2011 as Golden Fantasia X, including new characters and balance tweaks. An append disc for the original game, titled Golden Fantasia Cross, was released at Comiket 81 on December 31, 2011. MangaGamer released Golden Fantasia Cross to a worldwide market on December 8, 2017.

== Gameplay ==
Golden Fantasia is a fighting game that can be played by up to two players. Gameplay revolves around a tag-team battle system in which each player takes control of two characters, only one of which can be controlled at a time, but both of which can be switched out with the other through the game's "Touch" system. A "touch" can only be performed when a player's Touch Gauge is full (the gauge fills on its own over a set period of time). There are five kinds of touching methods, each of which uses up a different amount of the Touch Gauge: Normal Touch, which is used when the player isn't performing any other action; Attack Touch, which is performed when the player is in the middle of attacking an opponent; Guard Touch, for when the player is guarding against an opponent; Damage Touch, which can only be used when the player is damaged, and has the additional effect of creating a barrier that forces the opponent away from the player; and Assault Touch, in which the player performs a rushing attack towards an opponent before switching out.

Every character in the game has a unique ability which can be used to improve their own skills or their partners' skills for a limited period of time. There are two methods of activating abilities. The first method is through touching, which automatically activates the ability of the character being switched out and affects the character being switched in. The other method is by summoning the Metaworld, which not only drastically changes the background, but also activates the abilities of both the player character and their partner at the same time. The Metaworld can be summoned through use of the SP Gauge, which also allows characters to perform special, powerful attacks called "SP Supers" and "Meta Supers". However, two players cannot summon the Metaworld at the same time; the first player to summon the Metaworld will benefit from its effects, but it is possible for the other player to cancel out the opponent's Metaworld. The declaration-reversal cycle can be repeated twice, with a final declaration forcibly activating Metaworld. The Metaworld will remain active until the summoner's Meta Gauge runs out, where Each subsequent declaration reduces the duration of Metaworld by 25%.

== Plot ==
The game is set on the island of Rokkenjima, where a series of mysterious deaths and disappearances take place over the course of October 4 and 5, 1986. The story focuses on a game of twisted logic between Beatrice, a legendary witch who claims she used magic to perform the murders, and Battler Ushiromiya, a young man who argues that the murders could be carried out by ordinary humans. As a tag-team game, the game's story mode follows multiple pairs of characters, each of which has their own story and ending that take place in an alternate continuity from Umineko When They Cry.

== Characters ==
The original Golden Fantasia game features ten playable characters, and adds more characters in the sequel. The characters are all based on their appearances in the original visual novels.

Battler Ushiromiya (右代宮 戦人, Ushiromiya Batora)
Voiced by: Daisuke Ono
Battler is a versatile and well-rounded character who excels at close to mid-range melee combat, and has a number of powerful SP Super and Meta Super attacks. His ability, "Resurrection", gradually restores the player character's health over time.
Beatrice (ベアトリーチェ, Beatorīche)
Voiced by: Sayaka Ohara
Beatrice excels in various magical attacks, and has an arsenal of powerful SP Supers. Her ability, "Infinity SP", allows the player to perform one Super attack without using SP.
Ange Ushiromiya (右代宮 縁寿, Ushiromiya Enje)
Voiced by: Rina Satō
Ange can close the distance between her and her opponent by summoning Sakutarō and the Seven Sisters of Purgatory, who can attack freely from her. Her ability, "Stun Boost", increases the chance of the player's attacks stunning an opponent, making the opponent susceptible to more attacks.
Lucifer (ルシファー, Rushifā)
Voiced by: Yuka Saitō
Lucifer excels at performing attacks after the player switches her in using an Attack Touch. Her ability, "Attack Touch", allows the player to perform a single Attack Touch even if the player's Touch Gauge isn't full.
Shannon (紗音, Shanon)
Voiced by: Rie Kugimiya
Shannon has a defense-oriented fighting style that allows her to widen the distance between her and her opponent by creating barriers, which can nullify enemy attacks. Her ability, "Auto-Guard", allows the player to automatically block an opponent's attacks.
Kanon (嘉音)
Voiced by: Yū Kobayashi
Kanon is a fast melee character who possesses an array of swift attacks that can quickly be strung together into combos. His ability, "Silent Attack", decreases the amount of SP the opponent gains while they are being attacked.
Virgilia (ワルギリア, Warugiria)
Voiced by: Kikuko Inoue
Virgilia possesses a wide array of magical attacks and weapons designed to damage opponents regardless of her position in the arena. Her ability, "Brimful", gradually fills both player characters' SP Gauge over time.
Ronove (ロノウェ, Ronowe)
Voiced by: Tomokazu Sugita
Ronove, similar to Shannon, is a defense-oriented fighter who specializes in blocking and parrying his opponents' attacks. His ability, "Counter Boost", increases the damage dealt by the player's counters.
Eva Beatrice (エヴァ・ベアトリーチェ, Eva Beatorīche)
Voiced by: Miki Itō
Eva Beatrice is a melee fighter who specializes in close-range fighting and grappling. Her ability, "Berserk", increases damage dealt by 50%.
Chiester410 (シエスタ410, Shiesuta Yon'ichimaru)
Voiced by: Eri Kitamura
Chiester410 is a ranged fighter whose attacks can travel anywhere across the arena. Her ability, "Break Boost", increases the rate the opponent's Break Limit gauge will fill. The Break Limit gauge only fills when a player is blocking an attack; once completely filled, the target will suffer from a Guard Break, which leaves them open for attack.
Jessica Ushiromiya (右代宮 朱志香, Ushiromiya Jeshika)
Voiced by: Marina Inoue
Jessica is an additional character available in the Xbox 360 port, and is included with an expansion patch for the original game. She is a close-range melee fighter who can enhance her attacks to deal additional damage. Her ability, "Shave Boost", increase the chip damage dealt.
George Ushiromiya (右代宮 譲治, Ushiromiya Jōji)
Voiced by: Kenichi Suzumura
George is first introduced as a playable character in the Xbox 360 port. He specializes in performing high and low-range attacks to knock down his opponents. His ability, "Patience", causes the player's SP Gauge to fill while blocking attacks.
Rosa Ushiromiya (右代宮 楼座, Ushiromiya Rōza)
Voiced by: Ami Koshimizu
Rosa is another character introduced in the Xbox 360 port who is added to Cross. She is able to perform mid-ranged attacks with her weapon, a short-barreled rifle, which can also penetrate the defenses of the player's opponent. Her ability, "Detachment", allows the player to force a waiting state on the opponent's touch gauge, temporarily preventing the opponent from switching characters.
Erika Furudo (古戸 ヱリカ, Furudo Erika)
Voiced by: Natsuko Kuwatani
Erika is introduced as an additional character in Cross. She is more mobile than other characters, and is capable of performing secondary midair jumps. Her ability, "Force Counter", turns every attacks into a counter hit.
Dlanor A. Knox (ドラノール・A・ノックス, Doranōru A Nokkusu)
Voiced by: Miyuki Sawashiro
Dlanor is introduced as an additional character in Cross. She specializes in grappling opponents, and can summon her subordinates Gertrude and Cornelia to provide defensive support. Her ability, "Armor Boost", halves the damage received.
Black Battler (黒き戦人, Kuroki Batora)
Voiced by: Daisuke Ono
Black Battler is an additional character introduced in Cross, and is based on an extra tip written by Ryukishi07 outside of the main Umineko story. Black Battler is, much like his counterpart, an all-rounded character in term of close and mid-range, with few changes of properties in some attacks, as well as his HP. His ability, "Massacre", allows the player to absorb HP while damaging their opponent.
Willard H. Wright (ウィラード・H・ライト, Wirādo H Raito)
Voiced by: Hiroki Takahashi
Willard was included as part of an expansion for Cross released on February 24, 2012. Willard mainly specializes in long-ranged melee attacks with his katana. His ability, "SP Cancel", allows the player to cancel one special attack into an SP or meta super.
Lambdadelta (ラムダデルタ, Ramudaderuta)
Voiced by: Fuyuka Oura
Lambdadelta was included as part of an expansion for Cross released on March 23, 2012. Her moves mainly involve hurling candy and food at her opponents at a long range and she can also create a magical shield to defend herself from projectiles. Her ability, "UltraPER", instantly resets the player's break gauge.
Bernkastel (ベルンカステル, Berunkasuteru)
Voiced by: Yukari Tamura
Bernkastel was included as part of an expansion for Cross released on April 20, 2012. She's a projectile-based character who attacks with cats, crystals, and beams and can use different attacks for each crystal floating around her that she allows to generate. Additionally, she can perform a double jump, as well as an air dash, and she is the only character that can perform a meta declaration while airborne. Her ability, "MetaBoost", boosts the duration of the player character's meta-world declaration and increases the meta-gauge's refill speed.

== Release history ==
Golden Fantasia was released on December 31, 2010, at Comiket 79. An official soundtrack of the game was released the same day. On July 8, 2011, a patch was released that included Jessica as a playable character, as well as improved netplay, a replay section, CGs section, character-specific HP, and normal display settings for smoother gameplay. An Xbox 360 port of the original game developed by Alchemist was released on October 6, 2011, under the title Golden Fantasia X (黄金夢想曲X, Ōgon Musōkyoku X).

A sequel titled Golden Fantasia Cross (黄金夢想曲†CROSS, Ōgon Musōkyoku Cross) was released at Comiket 81 on December 31, 2011, in the form of an append disc for the original game. The sequel's development included a drawing contest held between July 15 and August 15, 2011, on the commercial online community Pixiv where the winners' artwork would be included within the game as collectibles. The English localization of Golden Fantasia Cross, titled Umineko: Golden Fantasia, was released on December 8, 2017. In addition to the new English translation, the game's netcode was overhauled to use a "rollback" system which mitigates input delay, similar to networking middleware GGPO. Steam integration was also introduced, which allows players to create lobbies and invite friends without the need to exchange IP addresses.

== Related media ==
A manga adaptation titled Ōgon Musōkyoku illustrated by Junka Morozumi began serialization in the December 2011 issue of Kadokawa Shoten's Comp Ace magazine and was compiled in one volume.
