= Boku no Natsuyasumi =

2000 video game

- PlayStation cover art
- Developer: Millennium Kitchen (Note: Additional work by Sony Computer Entertainment Japan.)
- Publisher: Sony Computer Entertainment
- Director: Kaz Ayabe
- Designer: Kaz Ayabe
- Artist: Mineko Ueda
- Writer: Kaz Ayabe
- Composer: Akiko Ukai
- Platforms: PlayStation; PlayStation Portable
- Release: PlayStation: JP: June 22, 2000; PlayStation Portable: JP: June 27, 2006
- Genres: Adventure, simulation
- Mode: Single-player

Boku no Natsuyasumi (transl. "My Summer Vacation") (Note: Japanese: ぼくのなつやすみ; shortened as Bokunatsu (ぼくなつ) or Boku (ぼく)) is a 2000 adventure video game developed by Millennium Kitchen and published by Sony Computer Entertainment for the PlayStation. It was directed, written, and designed by Kaz Ayabe. The game follows the summer vacation of Boku, a city-dwelling nine-year-old boy who in August 1975 is sent to stay with his extended family in the Japanese countryside for a month. Gameplay takes place in an open-ended environment where the player is free to determine how Boku spends the thirty-one in-game days of his summer vacation, with few set goals or specific obligations of gameplay progression.

Development of Boku no Natsuyasumi began in 1997, shortly after Ayabe left his position at the video game planning company K-Idea to establish Millennium Kitchen. Ayabe conceived of the game as a "nostalgic adventure" based in part on his own childhood summer vacations to the countryside homes of his relatives. The game features character design by illustrator Mineko Ueda and background work by the animation studio Kusanagi. The visual style is characterized by a juxtaposition of Ueda's cartoonish three-dimensional character models against these pre-rendered and hand-painted two-dimensional backgrounds.

Boku no Natsuyasumi was praised upon its release for its visual style, nostalgic atmosphere, and art direction, though critics noted that its open-ended ambitions were hampered by the technical limitations of the PlayStation platform. It has achieved a cult following both domestically and internationally, despite having never been officially released outside of Japan. The game won a New Wave Award at the fifth Japan Game Awards, and was a finalist for the Excellence Award at the third Japan Media Arts Festival. Three sequels have been produced: Boku no Natsuyasumi 2 (2002), Boku no Natsuyasumi 3 (2007), and Boku no Natsuyasumi 4 (2009). An enhanced port of Boku no Natsuyasumi, titled Boku no Natsuyasumi Portable: Mushimushi Hakase to Teppenyama no Himitsu!!, (Note: Japanese: ぼくのなつやすみポータブル ムシムシ博士とてっぺん山の秘密!!; transl. "My Summer Vacation Portable: The Insect Professor and the Secret of Mt. Teppen!!") was released on the PlayStation Portable in 2006.

== Plot ==
Set in August 1975, Boku no Natsuyasumi follows the player character Boku, (Note: The player character's name is a pun: the Japanese word boku translates to English as the pronoun "I" or "me", referencing the character's status as an avatar for the player.) a city-dwelling nine-year-old boy sent to stay with his extended family in the countryside for a month while his mother prepares to give birth to a second child. The game is framed as the recollection of the now-adult Boku, who occasionally narrates the story.

Boku stays in the home of his paternal aunt Kaoru Sorano, her potter husband Yusaku, and their two daughters: fifteen-year-old Moe and eight-year-old Shirabe. Over the course his month-long vacation, Boku stays in a bedroom peculiarly already decorated with objects typical of a boys' room and maintains a picture diary documenting his various activities and exploits, the precise details of which vary depending on gameplay choices and story events undertaken by the player. One day, the Soranos are visited by a priest and are led in prayer session around the family's shrine; the initially confused Boku learns that Kaoru and Yusaku once had a son who is now deceased, and that Boku is staying in what was his bedroom.

On the penultimate day of Boku's vacation, Shirabe goes missing, and Boku is able to track her to a large sunflower field. Shirabe, who has thus far been distant and irritable towards Boku, opens up to him and tells him that she does not want him to leave. On August 31, Boku's father returns to bring him home; as Boku departs while watching the Sorano family waving goodbye, his adult self narrates that it was a summer he would never forget. The game concludes with an epilogue set twenty-five years later depicting Boku's life as an adult, with multiple possible scenarios contingent on choices made by the player throughout the game.

== Gameplay ==
Boku no Natsuyasumi emphasizes general activities, such as exploration and bug catching, over specific objectives or obligations of gameplay progression.

Boku no Natsuyasumi is an open-ended simulation game self-described as a "nostalgic adventure", in which the player's actions determine how Boku spends the thirty-one in-game days of his summer vacation. Beyond the mandatory daily activities of morning radio calisthenics, breakfast, dinner, and bedtime, the game imposes no specific objectives or obligations of gameplay progression, and the player is free to spend their time as they see fit. Various activities can be undertaken by Boku, including but not limited to exploring the town and its surrounding environment, catching bugs, fishing, watering the Sorano family's morning glories, talking to the local townspeople, and flying a kite; the player can alternately choose to do nothing at all. The game's overworld is composed of a series of non-scrolling screens, and the in-game clock advances slightly whenever the character moves between screens. Each day ends with Boku recording the events of the day in his picture diary.

As the game progresses, areas of the overworld that are initially inaccessible to Boku become accessible through storyline events and player action. For example, Boku can clandestinely borrow his uncle's hatchet and use it to cut at a dead tree by a river; doing this action over three separate in-game days causes the tree to fall and become a log bridge that spans the river, making the far side accessible. New activities and non-player characters are introduced as Boku explores his surroundings and accesses new areas, such as a group of local boys who invite Boku to participate in a beetle fighting minigame, and a university student investigating reports of a wolf spirit in the woods.

== Production ==
=== Development ===
Boku no Natsuyasumi is developed by Millennium Kitchen and directed, written, and designed by Kaz Ayabe. Ayabe was a designer and project manager at the video game planning company K-Idea before departing the company in 1997 to establish Millennium Kitchen and develop what would become Boku no Natsuyasumi. He has identified two chief inspirations that informed his initial conceptualization of Boku no Natsuyasumi: the first was his regular reminiscence during stressful periods of work on his summer vacations spent at the home of his extended family in the countryside, which prompted him to consider the idea of a game that replicates the experience of a summer vacation. The second was his interest in raves; Ayabe is a techno and house music fan, and was regularly attending raves in remote locations such as mountains and beaches in the summer of 1997. He would camp in these remote areas, stating the experience was similar to "feel[ing] like you are becoming a caveman. You don't have all that artificial stuff near you, so you kind of become like your pure self".

Ayabe initially approached Sony Computer Entertainment about publishing Boku no Natsuyasumi, pitching it as a game aimed at a target audience of adults in their 30s, and stated that illustrator Mineko Ueda was interested in the project. Ueda, a commercial illustrator best known for her character illustrations that appear on packaging and commercials for consumer goods manufactured by the Lion Corporation, had in fact never met Ayabe; Ayabe subsequently approached Ueda and told her that Sony was interested in the project, and both she and Sony agreed to participate in the game's development. Ayabe later rationalized this strategy by stating that "they both said OK to the concept that same day, so it wasn't that big of a lie". Ayabe later learned that he had been the third individual to pitch Sony on a summer vacation game, which led the company to believe there would be broad interest in the concept.

With the exception of programming and sound design, the entirety of the game's development was completed by Millennium Kitchen. While the game was nominally produced by Sony imprint Contrail, according to Ayabe, the company was relatively uninvolved in the game's production. He noted that the producers "didn't have that many opinions" and that the suggestion of including a highway in the game's overworld was "basically the only feedback they had".

=== Setting ===
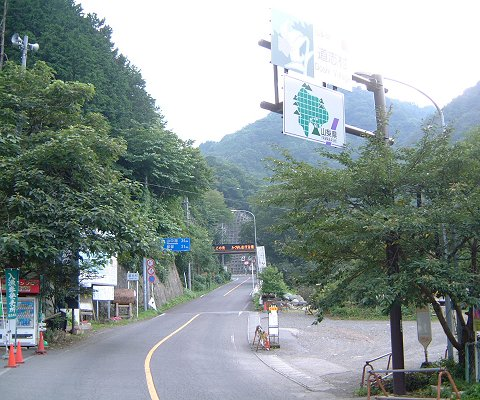
The game's setting is based on Tsukiyono in Yamanashi Prefecture; a photo of the Tsukiyono bus stop (pictured) appears on the back of the game's instruction manual.

The setting of Boku no Natsuyasumi is based on the town and surrounding environs of Tsukiyono, located in Yamanashi Prefecture roughly eighty miles west of Tokyo, (Note: Ayabe notes that the basis for the game is frequently mistaken for the better-known and identically named town in Gunma Prefecture.) though Ayabe has stated that the game's setting is intended to evoke "an average summer vacation in Japan that many people must have experienced" rather than be a replication of a specific place. Representatives from Millennium Kitchen undertook location scouting to gather reference material for the game in a variety of areas, including Tsukiyono, Chichibu, Saitama and Mashiko, Tochigi. Ayabe additionally gathered photos for use as reference while visiting his childhood home in Hokkaido during his own summer vacations, and was also the designer of the game's overworld map and buildings.

Ayabe initially conceived of Boku no Natsuyasumi as occurring in an intentionally vague time period, roughly between the late 1940s to the 1950s. As development progressed, he felt the game would be more relatable if it occurred in a specific era, and chose 1975 for the game's setting. He chose August as the month to set the game in due to what he described as the month's sense of melancholy and "foreboding that summer will end after Obon", noting how that feeling of sadness "entered unconsciously" into the game's story, particularly its latter half.

=== Art and graphics ===
Illustration of Boku by Mineko Ueda, displaying her characteristic use of figures with rounded features and dot eyes.

The visual style of Boku no Natsuyasumi is distinguished by its use of cartoonish three-dimensional character models that are juxtaposed against backgrounds that are two-dimensional, pre-rendered, and hand-painted. The backgrounds were designed by the animation studio Kusanagi, best known as the creators of the opening credits for the anime series Sazae-san. Ayabe has cited filmmaker Yasujirō Ozu as among his influences, and the focus on and framing of backgrounds in Boku no Natsuyasumi has been compared to Ozu's distinctive "pillow shots", wherein the camera lingers for an extended period on a landscape or other setting. In developing the backgrounds for the game, Millennium Kitchen gathered "several hundred" pictures of clouds for use as reference material, with Ayabe noting that "other companies will get in touch with me and ask if we have any good cloud pictures, because they know we have a lot of that material"; the cloud used on the box art for Boku no Natsuyasumi is also used on the cover of Everybody's Golf 3.

The game's character designs are created by illustrator Mineko Ueda. Ueda's figures in both Boku no Natsuyasumi and her commercial work are characterized by their simple and cartoonish designs, with rounded features and dot eyes. The artist stated that she was instructed to make the characters look like average people, commenting that the only design she made that was revised from its first pass was that of an aged hippie with long hair and a bandana; while Ueda said that she intended the design to evoke the game's 1970s setting, the developers told her to make the character look more "ordinary". Ayabe stated that he sought Ueda's participation in Boku no Natsuyasumi because he felt that a game set in historic rural Japan "for better or worse, could have been very 'Japanese' in style", and that he was drawn to Ueda's art style as it does not "have an overly 'Japanese' flavor".

=== Audio ===
The soundtrack to Boku no Natsuyasumi is composed by Akiko Ukai, while the theme song is the Ryoko Moriyama folk song "Kono Hiroi Nohara Ippai" (lit. 'Everything In This Great Field') covered by Fumi Oto. All of the environmental sounds that appear in the game were recorded at the various rural locations visited during location scouting, with recording undertaken by the same sound team at Sony that worked on the Gran Turismo series. Ayabe stated that the team attempted to record extremely quiet sounds, such as the sound of butterflies and bees flying, but that these recordings could not be used due to the technical limits of the PlayStation platform.

== Release ==
Boku no Natsuyasumi was released in Japan on the PlayStation on June 22, 2000, several months after the release of that console's successor, the PlayStation 2. The game has never been officially released outside of Japan. (Note: An English fan translation of Boku no Natsuyasumi was reported to be in production in 2021, with PC Gamer describing the endeavor as "a Holy Grail translation project — a game that a passionate group of fans have dreamed of playing in English for many years".) While originally slated for release in summer 1999, feedback from the game's producers to include the fishing gameplay elements in the prototype version of the game forced an extension of the production schedule, and the game was originally announced with a fall 1999 release date. According to Ayabe, Sony's public relations department subsequently intervened as they did not wish to release a summer vacation game in the fall, and Boku no Natsuyasumi's release was delayed by a full year until summer 2000. The delay allowed for three to four additional months of development, which Ayabe used to refine the game's event scripting and sound design.

=== Port ===
An enhanced port of Boku no Natsuyasumi, titled Boku no Natsuyasumi Portable: Mushimushi Hakase to Teppenyama no Himitsu!! (ぼくのなつやすみポータブル ムシムシ博士とてっぺん山の秘密!!; transl. "My Summer Vacation Portable: The Insect Professor and the Secret of Mt. Teppen!!") was released in Japan on the PlayStation Portable on June 29, 2006. Ayabe has described the port as the "creator's cut" of Boku no Natsuyasumi, as he was able to refine the existing content of the game while adding additional content. The remake introduces three new non-player characters, doubles the number of insect species that can be caught, and allows the trading of insects with other players using the PlayStation Portable's wireless communication feature.

A port of Boku no Natsuyasumi for smart devices was announced in 2016 at a press conference for the launch of Sony Interactive Entertainment's mobile games subsidiary ForwardWorks, but as of 2026 remains unproduced.

=== Sequels ===
Three sequels to Boku no Natsuyasumi have been produced: Boku no Natsuyasumi 2, released on the PlayStation 2 in 2002; Boku no Natsuyasumi 3, released on the PlayStation 3 in 2007, and Boku no Natsuyasumi 4, released on the PlayStation Portable in 2009. Each have similar gameplay structures and follow a boy named Boku as he goes on vacation in the summer of 1975, with the exception of the fourth entry in the series, which is set in 1985. Natsu-Mon: 20th Century Summer Kid, a game developed by Millennium Kitchen and written and designed by Ayabe, was released on the Nintendo Switch in 2023; though not strictly a Boku no Natsuyasumi title, the game is similar in its structure and themes. Ayabe did not initially conceive of Boku no Natsuyasumi as a franchise, but found that advancements in technology across console generations allowed for enough interesting new gameplay possibilities to justify the development of sequels.

== Reception and legacy ==
[Boku no Natsuyasumi] re-opens a window on the nostalgia of a generation that grew up, but it does it with respect and generosity — there is no symbolic blowing of dust off of an old photo album, and there is no message about how great things 'used to be'. This is very much a singular story about a little boy's vacation from home, and though it is presented as a recollection, it's still from within the worldview of the boy at the time.

— Ray Barnholt, Scroll

According to Ueda, Boku no Natsuyasumi had sold 130,000 copies by February 2001, which was considered a commercial success. The game was widely covered in the Japanese press upon its release, including by NHK and TV Tokyo, with Ueda noting that mainstream outlets "treated [it] as a bit of a social phenomenon". Among video game critics, Famitsu gave the game a score of 28 out of 40, praising its visual style and non-linear gameplay, but noted that its open-ended ambitions are hampered by the technical limitations of the PlayStation platform. Toshihisa Minami of Game Hihyō offered a similar evaluation of the game, commending its relaxed atmosphere but noting that activities that should ostensibly be possible (such as tree climbing and swimming) cannot be performed in the game, and criticized its use of tank controls. Ayabe has himself called the first Boku no Natsuyasumi his favorite of the series, describing it as the "most sentimental" entry and that "there are parts of the game that I feel are incomplete, but those incomplete elements are part of what I like about it".

The game has achieved a cult following both in Japan and internationally, despite having never been officially released outside of Japan. Among the western press, critic Ray Barnholt wrote for Unwinnable that while the game is "not above" leaning on the tropes of Japanese summer vacation media such as "incessant cicada chirps, bug catching, fireflies, local summer festivals and a hell of a lot of sunflowers", he praises Boku no Natsuyasumi for telling "a kind of story that virtually no other commercial games have bothered to explore". Kurt Kalata of Hardcore Gaming 101 wrote that the open-ended elements of the game are "fulfilling, even for those without any specific nostalgic connection to rural Japan".

Multiple outlets have commented on and offered praise for Boku no Natsuyasumi's nostalgic atmosphere and creative direction. Academic William Huber has described the game as an example of the concept of mono no aware in video games, writing that its use of nostalgia "ties the game with the film and literary tradition. As much as it is a simulation of a once-common rural summer that is no longer an option for many urbanized Japanese children, it is also a reminiscence of lost childhood". Video game scholar Agata Waszkiewicz cites Boku no Natsuyasumi alongside Harvest Moon (1996) and Animal Crossing (2001) as a progenitor of the "cozy game", a trend in gaming towards titles that seek to evoke a sense of nostalgia and escapism by exploring "themes of safety, abundance, and softness", and which accelerated in the 2010s with the rise of casual gaming. Adesh Thapliyal of Polygon similarly cites Boku no Natsuyasumi alongside Animal Crossing, Harvest Moon, and Shenmue (1999) as "examples of the late-'90s turn toward daily life in Japanese game development".

Boku no Natsuyasumi is credited with originating the so-called "summer vacation game" – Game Hihyō described Boku no Natsuyasumi as "pioneering its own genre" – with the years subsequent to its release seeing the development of multiple titles with similar themes and subject material, such as Inaka Kurashi for the PlayStation 2 and Houkago Shonen for the Nintendo DS. (Note: As a "summer vacation game", Boku no Natsuyasumi was in actuality predated by Summer Days, released by prolific one-man game developer Takeshi Sakai for MacOS in 1999. Barnholt reports that there was at one point media speculation that Sakai had sued the creators of Boku no Natsuyasumi for plagiarism, but no such lawsuit or accusation ever occurred.) Ayabe has addressed these titles in mixed terms, stating that "people mimicking the way we express things is fine, but mimicking the time setting and the target audience I feel isn't so cool".

=== Awards and accolades ===
In 1999, Boku no Natsuyasumi was exhibited at the third Japan Media Arts Festival and selected as a finalist for the festival's Excellence Award, losing to Seaman. At the fifth Japan Game Awards in 2000, Boku no Natsuyasumi was awarded the Package Design Award, and was a recipient of a New Wave Award alongside Phantasy Star Online and Kirby Tilt 'n' Tumble.

In a 2015 public survey by the Japanese search engine Goo to determine the greatest first generation PlayStation game, Boku no Natsuyasumi placed third, ranking behind Final Fantasy VII and the Resident Evil series.

=== "August 32nd" glitch ===
Subsequent to the release of Boku no Natsuyasumi, a glitch was discovered in the game wherein after certain inputs are made, the player will advance past the thirty-one in-game days of gameplay to "August 32nd" and beyond. As no story events were programmed for these days, the game becomes increasingly unstable with various gameplay and visual bugs, such as objects with distorted textures and character models with missing limbs. The glitch gained a degree of infamy as a Japanese Internet meme, most notably as a video uploaded to the video-sharing site Niconico depicting footage of the glitch with horror film-inspired editing and music. Ayabe has acknowledged the glitch in ambivalent terms and emphasized that its inclusion in the game was not intentional, but stated that because the glitch is merely trivial and not game-breaking, he feels a "tiny bit of pride" for its status as a subject of public curiosity.

== See also ==
- Attack of the Friday Monsters! A Tokyo Tale, 2013 adventure game developed by Millennium Kitchen and Ayabe
- Shin-chan: Me and the Professor on Summer Vacation, 2021 adventure game developed by Millennium Kitchen and Ayabe
- Natsu-Mon: 20th Century Summer Kid, 2023 adventure game developed by Millennium Kitchen and Ayabe
