= Boku no Natsuyasumi 2 =

2002 video game

- Developer: Millennium Kitchen (Note: Additional work by Sony Computer Entertainment Japan.)
- Publisher: Sony Computer Entertainment
- Platforms: PlayStation 2, PlayStation Portable
- Release: PlayStation 2: JP: July 11, 2002; PlayStation Portable: JP: June 24, 2010
- Genre: Adventure
- Mode: Single-player

Boku no Natsuyasumi 2: Umi no Bouken-hen (Note: Japanese: ぼくのなつやすみ2海の冒険篇, Hepburn: Boku no Natsuyasumi 2: Umi no Bouken-hen; lit. "My Summer Vacation 2: Sea Adventure Chapter") is an adventure video game developed by Millennium Kitchen and published by Sony Computer Entertainment for the PlayStation 2. It is part of the Boku no Natsuyasumi series and was released only in Japan on July 11, 2002. It is an alternate universe sequel in which the main character spends his summer in a different part of Japan from the first game. It takes place during the same summer with many of the same characters, but in a different location, a town on Japan's southern coast. A PlayStation Portable version was released on June 24, 2010, and a fan translation of the PlayStation 2 game into English was released on November 1, 2023.

== Description ==
The main character spends his summer vacation at his aunt and uncle's bed and breakfast in a southern Japanese coastal town. Features from the first game, like collecting and bug battles, return, along with new facets, like swimming. The player controls the main character for the thirty-one days of August 1975.

== Reception ==
Reception

Review score
| Publication | Score |
|---|---|
| Famitsu | 8/10, 9/10, 7/10, 9/10 (PS2) |

Boku no Natsuyasumi 2 was released for the PlayStation 2 in Japan on July 11, 2002.

The game was a jury recommended title at the 6th Japan Media Arts Festival in 2002.
