= Scum of the Brave =

Japanese light novel

- First light novel volume cover (original edition)

勇者のクズ (Yūsha no Kuzu)
- Genre: Urban fantasy
- Novel series
- Written by: Rocket Shokai
- Published by: Kakuyomu
- Original run: February 12, 2016 – March 22, 2016
- Light novel
- Written by: Rocket Shokai
- Illustrated by: Yūya Kusaka (original edition); toi8 (new edition)
- Published by: Fujimi Shobo (2016); Shueisha (2026–present)
- Imprint: Kadokawa Books (December 24, 2016); Dash X Bunko (January 23, 2026–present)
- Original run: December 24, 2016 – present
- Volumes: 1 (original edition); 3 (new edition)
- Manga
- Written by: Rocket Shokai
- Illustrated by: Nakashima723
- Published by: Leed Publishing (2022–present)
- English publisher: NA: Manga Planet
- Imprint: Border Comics
- Magazine: Comic Border (February 18, 2022–present)
- Original run: June 22, 2018 – present
- Volumes: 3 (digital); 8 (print)
- Anime television series
- Directed by: Shinji Ushiro
- Written by: Yōichi Katō
- Music by: Kenichiro Suehiro
- Studio: OLM Team Hikita
- Licensed by: Crunchyroll: SA/SEA: Muse Communication
- Original network: NNS (Nippon TV)
- Original run: January 11, 2026 – June 28, 2026
- Episodes: 24
- icon

Scum of the Brave (Japanese: 勇者のクズ, Hepburn: Yūsha no Kuzu) is a Japanese light novel series written by Rocket Shokai and illustrated by Yūya Kusaka. It was initially serialized as a web novel published on Kadokawa Corporation's Kakuyomu website between February and March 2016. A single volume was published under Fujimi Shobo's Kadokawa Books imprint in December 2016. A manga adaptation illustrated by Nakashima723 initially began serialization as an independent comic in June 2018, before beginning serialization on Leed Publishing's Comic Border manga website in February 2022. A new edition of the light novel series illustrated by toi8 began publication by Shueisha under their Dash X Bunko imprint in January 2026. An anime television series adaptation produced by OLM aired from January to June 2026.

== Plot ==
Set in mid-21st-century Tokyo, the criminal underworld is dominated by Demon Lords, gang leaders who have gained overwhelming powers through ether enhancement and Demon King Transformation Surgery. To counter them, the government sanctions "Heroes", bounty hunters who amplify their own ether abilities using the drug E3 and are legally permitted to kill.

The story follows Yashiro, a lone wolf Hero known as the Reaper, who lives a dissolute life and prefers to work alone. His routine is disrupted when Jōgamine, a determined high school girl who declares herself his apprentice inserts herself into his work. Soon after, Yashiro is approached by additional aspiring high school heroes and agrees to train them for money. As Yashiro becomes entangled with his would-be students, he is drawn into escalating confrontations with Demon Lords, rival Heroes, and criminal organizations, placing him at the center of increasingly dangerous and chaotic conflicts within Tokyo's underworld.

== Characters ==
"Shinigami" Yashiro (《死神》ヤシロ)
Voiced by: Ryōta Suzuki
Aki Jōgamine (城ヶ峰 亜希, Jōgamine Aki)
Voiced by: Akari Kitō
Yukine Indō (印堂 雪音, Indō Yukine)
Voiced by: Momo Harumi
Sara Kashiwagi Pendragon (セーラ・カシワギ・ペンドラゴン, Sēra Kashiwagi Pendoragon)
Voiced by: Yumiri Hanamori
"Salt" Joe (《ソルト》ジョー, "Soruto" Jō)
Voiced by: Hinata Tadokoro
"Ongakuya" Ishinō (《音楽屋》イシノオ)
Voiced by: Daisuke Hirakawa
"Moguri" no Maruta (《もぐり》のマルタ)
Voiced by: Yasuhiro Takato
Lord "Amber Thorn" (《琥珀の茨》卿, "Kohaku no Ibara" Kyō)
Voiced by: Kenjiro Tsuda
Kiyoto Takamiya (鷹宮清人, Takamiya Kiyoto)
Voiced by: Shin-ichiro Miki
Lord "Wedge of Both Hands" (《諸手の楔》卿, "Morote no Kusabi" Kyō)
Voiced by: Yūichirō Umehara
Arthur Pendragon (アーサー・ペンドラゴン, Āsā Pendoragon)
Voiced by: Katsuyuki Konishi

== Media ==
=== Light novel ===
Written by Rocket Shokai, Scum of the Brave was initially serialized on Kadokawa Corporation's Kakuyomu website from February 12 to March 22, 2016. A single volume with illustrations by Yūya Kusaka was released under Fujimi Shobo's Kadokawa Books light novel imprint on December 24, 2016.

A new edition illustrated by toi8 began publication under Shueisha's Dash X Bunko light novel imprint on January 23, 2026. Three volumes have been released as of June 25, 2026.

==== Original edition ====
No.	Release date	ISBN
1	December 24, 2016	978-4-04-072154-5

==== New edition ====
No.	Release date	ISBN
1	January 23, 2026	978-4-08-631634-7
2	February 20, 2026	978-4-08-631639-2
3	June 25, 2026	978-4-08-631659-0

=== Manga ===
A manga adaptation illustrated by Nakashima723 initially began serialization as an independent comic on June 22, 2018. It later began serialization on Leed Publishing's Comic Border manga website on February 18, 2022. The manga's chapters have been collected into eight tankōbon volumes as of December 2025. The manga is published in English by Manga Planet.

No.	Release date	ISBN
1	March 3, 2019 (ebook); April 22, 2022 (print)	978-4-8458-6119-4
2	June 10, 2020 (ebook); May 20, 2022 (print)	978-4-8458-6123-1
3	September 17, 2021 (ebook); June 24, 2022 (print)	978-4-8458-6128-6
4	January 27, 2023	978-4-8458-6151-4
5	September 22, 2023	978-4-8458-6166-8
6	May 31, 2024	978-4-8458-6623-6
7	March 21, 2025	978-4-8458-6783-7
8	December 18, 2025	978-4-8458-6990-9

=== Anime ===
An anime television series adaptation was announced on March 15, 2025. It is produced by OLM and directed by Shinji Ushiro, with series composition and screenplays handled by Yōichi Katō, characters designed by Rika Murakami, and music composed by Kenichiro Suehiro. The series aired from January 11 to June 28, 2026, on Nippon TV and its affiliates, and ran for two consecutive cours. For the first cours, the opening theme song is "Gun Powder", performed by Tooboe, and the ending theme song is "Mental Rental" (メンタルレンタル), performed by Murasaki Ima. For the second cour, the opening theme song is "Revive", performed by ClariS, while the ending theme song is "Non-Fiction.", performed by w.o.d. Crunchyroll is streaming the series. Muse Communication licensed the series in South and Southeast Asia.

==== Episodes ====
No.	Title	Directed by (Note: Production staff information is taken from the ending credits of each episode.)	Storyboarded by	Chief animation directed by	Original release date
1	"Meeting of the Braves"; Transliteration: "Yūsha no Deai" (Japanese: 勇者の出会い)	Kim Won-Hoe & Lee Jong-Kyung	Shinji Ushiro	Hiroko Kūrube	January 11, 2026
In the near future a revolutionary surgery known as Ether Enhancement proves capable of granting humans overwhelming powers. Among the criminal underworld this leads to the rise of empowered gang leaders known as Demon Lords. To oppose them the Japanese government sanctions bounty hunters who temporarily gain ether abilities via the drug E3, becoming known as Braves. One such Brave is "Reaper" Yashiro, who one day sees trainee Brave Jogamine thrown from a roof by ether empowered thugs belonging to Demon Lord Thorn. Yashiro kills the thugs and advises Jogamine to find another career, as only scum become Braves. Yashiro heads to Ed's bar to meet "Salt" Joe and "Ongaku" Ishino. Yogino and her teammate Indo follow and request his help, as they must slay Thorn to rescue their kidnapped friend. Yashiro refuses as all three girls are from Shibuya Brave Academy, which claims to be a school but turns naïve teenagers into assassins. Indo leaves, revealing her power lets her teleport. Jogamine stays with Yashiro and he eventually agrees to help for ¥20million. He borrows a sword from Ed while Yogino explains Thorn's power causes pain and paralysis, but Yashino is confident Thorn will be easily defeated.
2	"A Brave's Magic"; Transliteration: "Yūsha no Mahō" (Japanese: 勇者の魔法)	Yūki Kakuhara	Kazuya Mitsuhashi	Ippei Ichii	January 18, 2026
Jogamine objects to Yashiro killing guards when their target is Thorn, even though Indo has already killed dozens of men. Yashiro reveals his ether ability lets him experience time in slow motion, so he can dodge bullets and attack lightning fast, but abusing the ability can cause hyper-aggression. They find Indo with a broken leg, having been defeated by Thorn already. Yashiro recalls Thorn is a low-level Demon Lord with a bounty of only ¥3million. His ability lets him manipulate invisible vines to restrain and tear flesh, but Yashiro simply deploys a smoke bomb, exposing the vines as they move through the smoke. He severs Thorn's arm, but the arm regenerates with Thorn unable to control it as it lashes out wildly and kills one of his guards. Indo tries to rescue their friend, Sara. Yashiro considers letting them both die but remembers a lesson from his master that if he does not want to be scum then he has to act like a hero. He rescues them by jumping on them so Thorn hits him instead. Jogamine suddenly jump in and childishly hits Thorn over the head until he surrenders. Yashiro is dumbfounded it worked, and Jogamine reveals her ether ability lets her read minds.
3	"A Teacher for Braves"; Transliteration: "Yūsha no Kyōkan" (Japanese: 勇者の教官)	Shigeki Hatakeyama	Kazuya Mitsuhashi	Hiroko Kūrube	January 25, 2026 (Note: This episode aired at 1:05 a.m. JST, 10 minutes after the regular air time on Nippon TV.)
Yashiro is surprised Thorn grew back a severed limb and wonders if it is some newly developed E3, since whole limb regeneration was considered impossible. Yashiro is furious Jogamine confesses she doesn't have the ¥20million fee she promised. Sara confesses they are close to failing out of the academy. Yashiro is contacted by Sara's father, Arthur Pendragon, President of the Round Table Foundation and Academy Director. Arthur admits all three girls have personalities unsuited to learning in an academy, so he offers Yashiro a regular salary to provide more unorthodox training to help them graduate, completely ignoring Yashiro's protests that he will never teach apprentices. Aided by Ishino, who finds the situation hilarious, Indo begins following Yashiro asking for lessons. Yashiro refuses, claiming it is unsafe since Demon Lords are always sending assassins after him. Sure enough, the assassin Twin Pincers approaches with his team, intending to kidnap him for a Demon Lord who wants Yashiro to work for him. After a short fight Twin Pincers is wounded in the neck and flees with his remaining men. Yashiro leaves the injured for the police, but robs them of their cash and E3 first. Indo thanks him for the combat lesson but he still insists he is not teaching her.
4	"A Brave's Errands"; Transliteration: "Yūsha no Otsukai" (Japanese: 勇者のおつかい)	Tomoya Takashima	Kazuya Mitsuhashi	Ippei Ichii	February 1, 2026
Ishino hires Jogamine to investigate Thorn's activities and coerces Yashiro into helping in exchange for clearing his gambling debts. Ishino sends them to Club Hex3 where dealer Matsugi will give them E3 and Jogamine will ask him a certain question. At the club Matsugi approaches them and Jogamine abruptly asks if he has any E4. Matsugi claims ignorance but from reading his thoughts Jogamine can tell the question made him suspicious. After he leaves Jogamine insists on confronting three drug dealers trying to get teenagers addicted to E3. The boss turns out to have the E3 ability to sense emotion, so he can identify lies. Yashiro admits he is the Reaper, surprising them that Yashiro is the Brave being hunted by Demon Lord Coffin Count. Jogamine reads his mind and learns his drugs come from Verdigris Quarter, a woman employed by Coffin Count. The boss offers Yashiro a duel with one of his men for the girls. Despite his opponents ability being an invisible sword Yashiro breaks his arm and escorts the girls to safety. He asks why Jogamine insists on being a Brave. Jogamine explains her father was a Brave who died when she was young. Later, Ishino almost tells Yashiro who her father was, but Yashiro claims not to care and hangs up the phone.
5	"A Brave Sensei"; Transliteration: "Yūsha no Sensei" (Japanese: 勇者の先生)	Hiroyuki Matsui & Satoshi Matsukawa	Minoru Ōhara	Toshiaki Ohashi	February 8, 2026
Sara visits Yashiro with a personal request; as a second year she needs to be seen carrying out acts of public service, but due to her father not wanting her to become a Brave the academy instructors have refused to act as witnesses. As a registered Brave Yashiro can act as her witness. Her plan is to rescue Komugi, a kidnapped police dog and pay Yashiro the ¥100,000 reward. They track Komugi to an abandoned mall and discover dozens of caged animals including Komugi and a panda whose corpse had been stolen after it died at a nearby zoo, now mutated into a giant monster. With her E3 ability to sense danger Sara detects Twin-Pincers. Twin-Pincers admits he is experimenting on animals to create soldiers for his master. He activates the panda as a distraction to escape, though the panda turns out to be easily defeated. Sara returns Komugi and also takes credit for locating the stolen panda to pass her class. Yashiro claims the reward but most of it is taken straight away by Ed to pay his overdue bar tab. Ishino is approached by Kay, one of Arthur's maids, with an offer to join a team and hunt a certain Demon Lord for ¥80Million, but Ishino refuses to ever work with the Round Table.
6	"A Brave's Special Training"; Transliteration: "Yūsha no Tokkun" (Japanese: 勇者の特訓)	Yasuyuki Fuse	Minoru Ōhara	Hiroko Kūrube	February 15, 2026
"Mole" Malta, an unlicenced Brave, visits Yashiro with news he tried to get an honest job but assaulted his boss for stealing money from elderly people. He also stole the man's ticket to an autograph event with King Rob, whom many Braves idolise, which he offers to Yashiro for ¥30,000. Needing money, Yashiro agrees to tutor Jogamine, Indo and Sara before their upcoming sword exam, which determines if they become second years or get expelled. They pay him ¥50,000, allowing him to buy the ticket. Wanting to start immediately they break into the Academy to use their equipment. Straight away he determines Sara was trained not to start a fight unless victory is certain, causing her to either avoid fights, take stupid risks or surrender. Indo has no major weaknesses except a lack of experience. Jogamine doesn't believe in killing, so in a fight she is reluctant to hurt her opponents, making victory impossible. Security guards approach so Yashiro orders Sara and Jogamine to defeat them so they can escape. However, Yashiro recognises the symptoms of long term E3 overdose on them and guesses they aren't guards at all. Sara is injured and one of the intruders, Ido, grows a demonic arm similar to Thorn's.
7	"Death of a Brave"; Transliteration: "Yūsha no Shi" (Japanese: 勇者の死)	Hiroaki Yoshikawa	Kim Won-Hoe	Ippei Ichii	February 22, 2026
The other intruder, Levy, target Yashiro, but he helps Sara escape after she freezes in fear. Levy uses her E3 tracking ability to find Yashiro. Jogamine reads Levy's mind and learns she tracks scents. Yashiro knocks Levy out by breaking her nose so she can't smell. Ido agrees fighting further would be unwise, so he lets them leave. Jogamine admits her father used to tell her stories about Yashiro. Yashiro realises Jogamine's father is "Nine-fingers" Kiyoto, his own master. Jogamine insists Kiyoto would brag about Yashiro and all the battles he won. Yashiro is confused as he can only remember Kiyoto as a nervous man who taught him Braves are scum. Upset by painful memories, he sends Jogamine home so he can go to Ed's and get drunk. He finds Sara there who explains her danger-sensing ability lets her sense strength as well, which is why looking at Levy made her freeze. Yashiro tells her there is nothing wrong with being afraid as long as you work hard to get over it. Joe suddenly appears with news Ishino was found dead holding a dragon-shaped badge. Yashiro remembers Levy had been wearing an identical badge.
8	"A Brave's Sins"; Transliteration: "Yūsha no Tsumi" (Japanese: 勇者の罪)	Hiroyuki Matsui & Satoshi Matsukawa	Akira Nishimori	Yūji Ikeda	March 1, 2026
Joe tortures the Brave Matsugi, who confesses the dragon badges are worn by the E4 dealing gang Half Dragon, who paid him to betray Ishino for killing their Demon Lord customers. From evidence on Ishino's body Yashiro suspects Twin Pincers and his men took part in the murder. Yashiro accepts a 20Million bounty from a politician to retrieve his son Yoshi, who works for Twin Pincers. Yashiro and Malta confront Twin Pincers, who insists he did not murder Ishino. He also claims Storms is not the one selling E4, but he is an enemy of Half Dragon who sell E4 strategically to promote conflict between demon lords. Twin Pincers offers to work together against Half Dragon, but Yashiro refuses and insists on taking Yoshi. Yashiro kills Yoshi's sister, who ran away with him but was not wanted back by their father. Malta captures Yoshi, but Twin Pincers mercy kills Yoshi, having promised Yoshi he would do so if there was a risk of being returned to his abusive father. Twin Pincers escapes and the politician is enraged by Yoshi's death, but only because it reflects badly on his own reputation.
9	"A Brave's Legacy"; Transliteration: "Yūsha no Isan" (Japanese: 勇者の遺産)	Yosuke Fujino	Minoru Ōhara	Hiroko Kūrube	March 8, 2026
Yashiro receives a party invitation. Indo and Sara pass their sword exam, but Jogamine fought her opponent Helen to a draw and has to retake the exam. As he already promised extra training he decides to take them to the party. He asks Sara to pick dresses for herself, Jogamine and Indo. Yashiro hopes whoever sent the party invitation knows more about Half Dragon. Yashiro reveals to Joe Ishino had his recorder on while being killed and left a message for Yashiro to keep protecting the girls, suggesting they are connected to Half Dragon. The girls protest at wearing dresses but Yashiro points out they are too used to one-on-one battles, so by wearing restrictive clothing in a hostile environment it will force them to improvise and be more flexible. He also reveals the party was arranged by Coffin Count of Storms who controls West Tokyo. At the party Yashiro warns the girls to avoid the more dangerous Lords in attendance; Judging Count of Silver String who partially controls North Tokyo, the Warped Garden Count and twin sisters Counts of Mournful Pulsation and Count of Mournful Spray. The girls are surprised when Yashiro suddenly picks a fight with security, drawing attention from all the guests including the Counts.
10	"A Brave's Instruction"; Transliteration: "Yūsha no Shidō" (Japanese: 勇者の指導)	Shigeki Hatakeyama	Minoru Ōhara	Toshiaki Ohashi	March 15, 2026
Indo and Sara kill or incapacitate their opponents but Jogamine repeatedly misses opportunities to kill, forcing Sara to save her life. Fed up with her unwillingness to hurt opponents, Yashiro yells at her. Jogamine is deeply upset by what she sees from reading his mind. Coffin appears and is disappointed Yashiro isn't there to join her organisation, despite repeated invitations and even large cash bribes. Yashiro demands information on Half Dragon, whom Coffin is also enemies with. Desiring to see Yashiro's mastery of the sword, she offers to tell him everything if he defeats her four Stormguards. Mutated humans attack the party, so Coffin leaves disappointed. Indo recognises the mutants as Nephilim, whom she has encountered before, and attacks them in a rage. Yashiro saves her life but his left leg is seriously injured and will take several minutes to heal. He deduces the Academy taught the girls to fight as a trio, likely to keep Sara as safe as possible. Unfortunately, this is a bad way to fight and almost certainly ends in the death of all three in a real battle. On the fly he rearranges them so Jogamine attacks the knees, Sara the spines and Indo protects them from attacks.
11	"A Brave's Teamwork"; Transliteration: "Yūsha no Renkei" (Japanese: 勇者の連係)	Yasuyuki Fuse	Minoru Ōhara	Kenji Ota	March 22, 2026
In the middle of battle Jogamine is injured protecting Yashiro. Yashiro realises why Jogamine irritates him so much; she is trying to be the ideal brave, one who saves people and doesn't kill, a Brave people can respect, the kind he always wished to be. Silver Strings grows bored and leaves. Yashiro considers using more E3, risking going berserk if he overdoses. Before he can Levy appears and controls the Nephilim with a whistle, disappointed they weren't as useful as she hoped. She leaves with most of them, leaving Ido behind. Yashiro guesses it was Ishino that cut off Ido's arm, requiring him to replace it with a mutated one. Ido admits this is true and that it was he that murdered Ishino. Jogamine attacks him first but is pushes back. With his leg still healing Yashiro telepathically tells Jogamine how to counter Ido's moves, focusing on his mutated left hand he hasn't mastered using yet. Frustrated he can't even beat Jogamine, Ido goes for a large swing but Yashiro takes advantage and stabs him in the leg before cutting open his stomach, killing him.
12	"A Brave's Secret"; Transliteration: "Yūsha no Himitsu" (Japanese: 勇者の秘密)	Yosuke Fujino	Naohito Takahashi	Hiroko Kūrube	March 29, 2026
Jogamine's destroyed left eye completely regenerates, a feat impossible for normal E3, causing Yashiro to wonder if she is completely human. He questions Ed on whether Kiyoto was really Jogamine's father. Ed only reveals he swore Kiyoto an oath of secrecy, but in his opinion, Kiyoto was the strongest Brave who ever lived and died for a stupid reason, albeit without any regrets. Yashiro recalls all Kiyoto ever wanted to be was a hero. Coffin Count goes missing, causing chaos as other Demon Lords fight over her territory. Yashiro talks with Indo about her obvious past in the military before enrolling at the academy, most likely as a mercenary in the Shadow Territory where a dozen Demon Lords took over Hokkaido as a separate country from Japan. Indo admits she was a Lamplighter, a child soldier raised by Brave mercenaries to stop Demon Lords expanding outside Hokkaido. It was also common there to see Nephilim roaming the woods, but a pack of them attacked their home, killing the Braves. Indo froze from fear and her friend Haru died protecting her. As the Nephilim came from Hokkaido Yashiro decides he must go there and investigate, while taking Indo with him for revenge.
13	"A Brave's Doubts"; Transliteration: "Yūsha no Gimon" (Japanese: 勇者の疑問)	Ayae Shinkai	Akira Nishimori	Chie Mishima & Toshiaki Ohashi	April 12, 2026
Jogamine and Sara protest against Yashiro showing favouritism to Indo, so he reluctantly agrees they can come to Hokkaido as well. After training Yashiro takes Sara home as they are going the same direction. Sara is upset he won't tell them everything about Hokkaido. Privately, Yashiro is certain Half Dragon has powerful backers, powerful enough to not worry about making an enemy of Coffin Count. Elsewhere, Twin Pincers assassinates the Count of India Ink, a Half Dragon ally. Two days later Yashiro and the girls enter Hokkaido near Mount Maoi. Indo advises the territory belongs to Count of Rupturing Star Charts, one of Hokkaido's three Overlords who can control the weather. Yashiro admits he hopes to make a deal with Star Charts. They stop at the church hideout of one of Yashiro's past acquaintances, but find it turned into a hot spring hotel. Thery approach suspicious, but are attacked by a swordsman of equal skill to Yashiro and a sniper who shoots Jogamine in the head. Unsure what to do, Yashiro is furious to find the swordsman is Malta playing a prank on him, and the sniper was using almost harmless rubber bullets.
14	"A Brave Priest"; Transliteration: "Yūsha no Shinpu" (Japanese: 勇者の神父)	Yūki Kakuhara	Minoru Ōhara	Toshiaki Ohashi & Ippei Ichii	April 19, 2026
Malta reveals the priest turned his church into an inn for Braves and mercenaries. The sniper is Brave "Magic Bullet" Tetsu. Yashiro warns the girls the priest is "Father" Ayashima and an unhinged serial killer wanted by the police, so Yashiro insists on sharing the girl's room for safety, as proven necessary when they find traps in their room. Yashiro reveals King Rob will be holding an autograph session, so he needs to be ready for the card competition. The girls ask to learn the game, medallion, which Yashiro is notoriously poor at. Malta reveals the Nephilim are produced by the Venusian Veil Count, so he invites them to join a raid organized by Star Charts. Yashiro notices Star Charts appears unusually young to have been a Demon Lord for over 50 years. Jogamine feels something is suspicious but can't tell what even with mind-reading. Star Charts sends messages to other Demon Lords predicting thunder storms. Yashiro's team includes the girls, Malta, Tetsu, recon specialist Shikizaki, fighters Hotta, Soya, Kumaishi and her nervous older sister, Higa, Onoda, Tsugi, pilot Hatakeyama and communications expert Kito. As they approach Venusian Veil's castle Star Charts takes out the defences with lightning and a tornado.
15	"A Brave's Melee"; Transliteration: "Yūsha no Ransen" (Japanese: 勇者の乱戦)	Fumio Itou	Naohito Takahashi	Kenji Ota	April 26, 2026
Veil decides to flee with his enhanced subordinates, Levy's students Tomoe, Seki and Drit. Yashiro and the girls track them to tunnels under the castle. Malta is shown using his E3 ability to force his way into people's memories to see if any of the scientists know about Half Dragon. Yashiro locates a body storage room showing Nephilim are mutated humans. Jogamine is overwhelmed by so many minds all in pain. Veil appears and uses a light manipulation ability to darken the room. Jogamine and Sara's abilities let them detect Veil sneaking up on them while Yashiro relies on hearing to defend against Tomoe's spear skills. As they can fight in the dark, Veil turns the light back on. Seki reveals he can generate invisible steps to stand on in midair. Yashiro worries about the girls facing Veil as Indo needs time to activate her teleportation, Sara is quickly becoming too scared to fight and Jogamine is already injured. Unable to defeat Yashiro, Seki uses a Nephilim whistle to activate Drit, who possesses a mutated arm similar to Ido and Thorn. Tomoe, Seki and Drit escape, leaving Veil alone to fight Yashiro and the girls.
16	"The Darkness of Braves"; Transliteration: "Yūsha no Yami" (Japanese: 勇者の闇)	Yasuyuki Fuse	Minoru Ōhara	Kenji Ota & Hiroko Kūrube	May 3, 2026
Yashiro uses a technique taught to him by Kiyoto and slashes Veil's neck. Veil claims to recognise the move as Kiyoto's before he collapses. Yashiro is disappointed in all three girls and decides to talk to them about it in private. He accuses Sara of cowardice, with Sara admitting her father trained her so fiercely just holding a sword makes her afraid. Yashiro guesses that Arthur, who was against Sara becoming a Brave, made her afraid of fighting on purpose. Indo he accuses of using the same move repeatedly just because it works on Nephilim, the source of her past trauma. She also focuses too much on defending her teammates, making it likely she would be the one to die first. Jogamine is disappointed Yashiro has nothing to say to her except that she should quit being a Brave. The girls take so long bathing there is no food left at the victory celebration, and Yashiro is forced to stay sober to protect them from Ayashima. Star Charts admits Half Dragon do not operate in her territory, but they might have allies elsewhere in Hokkaido. Joe calls Yashiro to ask how the raid went. Yashiro admits Malta discovered on Veil's computers that Yashiro's master Kiyoto, Jogamine's father, was an executive of Half Dragon.
17	"Return of the Braves"; Transliteration: "Yūsha no Kikan" (Japanese: 勇者の帰還)	Oyunamu	Minoru Ōhara	Kenji Ota & Hiroko Kūrube	May 10, 2026
Yashiro further reveals Kiyoto was involved in the creation of E4, but it came with a high risk of insanity and mutation with only some humans partially resistant to it. Half Dragon was paying Veil to solve the mutation issues, but he used it to create Nephilim. According to the records, Veil found a ten-year-old child almost perfectly resistant to the side effects, and used her as a test subject for years. Joe reveals he discovered that Kiyoto did have a daughter who died when she was ten, until she reappeared in order to attend Shibuyu Academy. Joe was unable to interview Kiyoto's ex wife as she died right before Jogamine went to Shibuyu. Yashiro deduces Kiyoto experimented on his daughter's corpse and actually resurrected her with E4 as Jogamine, though it is unclear if Jogamine is aware of this. Joe urges Yashiro to come home, revealing Ed was shot in a fight between Demon Lords. They return to Tokyo and discover Arthur and his Round Table are cooperating with the JSDF to combat the recent Demon Lord activity. Yashiro suspects Coffin Count is pulling strings behind the scenes as Veil's computers also outed her as part of Half Dragon. Unfortunately, they can't do anything without resupplying their E3, plus Seki, Tomoe and Drit have followed them from Hokkaido.
18	"Braves in Danger"; Transliteration: "Yūsha no Kiki" (Japanese: 勇者の危機)	Shigeki Hatakeyama	Kōji Fukazawa	Kenji Ota & Hiroko Kūrube	May 17, 2026
With Seki and Tomoe attacking from another car Yashiro has the girls use the last of their E3 but waits to use it himself. Mutated hunting dogs chase them and Indo manages to prevent Drit ambushing them, but it costs them Jogamine's shield. Without a shield Yashiro lends Jogamine his two-handed sword. Drit catches up so Indo fights him on the roof of their car. Jogamine takes out Tomoe and Seki's car with a tear gas grenade. More dogs join the chase and Drit is thrown from the car by Indo, who loses one of her knives. She borrows Jogamine's short sword and decides to stay and fight Drit so the others can escape. Yashiro unwillingly agrees only because her teleportation means she can escape, so he gives her his last E3 dose. A giant robot appears ahead of them, so Yashiro crashes the car to take it out, forcing Jogamine to catch him as he doesn't have his healing to survive the crash. He theorises the robot was either directly created by an E3 ability, or was built first and controlled by a telekinesis ability. They are forced to run with Sarah and Jogamine protecting Yashiro from the dogs.
19	"A Brave's Motivation"; Transliteration: "Yūsha no Riyū" (Japanese: 勇者の理由)	Tomoya Takashima	Akira Nishimori	Ippei Ichii & Toshiaki Ohashi	May 24, 2026
They are forced to take longer routes to avoid battles between Demon Lords and other Braves, which soon exhausts Yashiro. Jogamine's insistence they do the right thing by somehow stopping the fighting annoys him. Jogamine accepts this as Yashiro only seems to be friends with people he dislikes. Tomoe and Seki arrive so Yashiro hopes to steal some E3 from them. Sarah notices someone else in their car. As they fight Yashiro finds without E3 he can't shoot as everyone is moving too fast. The dogs arrive, and Jogamine saves Yashiro but is stabbed through the stomach by Tomoe. Tomoe ties her up and the third person reveals herself, Levi, a Brave who overdosed on E3, went insane, and now works for Demon Lords. Levi accuses Yashiro of being an addict just like her, any excuse to feel powerful on E3, including personal revenge like when he killed Ido. She chokes him unconscious and Yashiro dreams of the day Takamiya was killed by an ordinary criminal while not using E3. Yashiro awakens in a room with Seki, who reveals Levi once saved him from a Demon Lord's thug, so he became loyal to her, unlike Tomoe who just enjoys killing. Levi is revealed to be working for Coffin Count.
20	"A Brave's Rescue"; Transliteration: "Yūsha no Kyūshutsu" (Japanese: 勇者の救出)	Ayae Shinkai	Naohito Takahashi	Hiroko Kūrube	May 31, 2026
Yashiro deduces if Coffin and Half Dragon are allies then it means Coffin arranged the Nephilim attack on her own party then disappeared afterwards so the remaining Demon Lords would start killing each other in battles for her territory. When everything was over, Coffin would be able to take over the territory of the dead Demon Lords without a fight. Joe suddenly arrives with Sara and Indo, giving Yashiro E3 and a sword. Seki flees. Indo admits Drit got away, and she lost a finger fighting him, but Yashiro rewards her with head pats anyway. They find the building in chaos, as Joe's ability not only makes him bulletproof, he can create explosions wherever he wants with his mind. Ed also arrives, having left the hospital to help in exchange for Sara paying to fix the damage to his bar. They locate Jogamine from her outraged screaming and find her being restrained by Twin Pincers. Yashiro notices Indo and Sara have improved in a short time, with Indo thinking strategically and Sara deliberately waiting for counterattack opportunities. Twin Pincer's men escape, and Yashiro defeats Twin Pincers in a duel but leaves him alive to interrogate him.
21	"A Brave's Pride"; Transliteration: "Yūsha no Kyōji" (Japanese: 勇者の矜持)	Yosuke Fujino	Akira Nishimori	Ippei Ichii & Chie Mishima	June 7, 2026
Pincers admits Coffin wanted to recruit Ishino to help her fight Half-Dragon. When six Demon Lords were killed, Ido and other assassins from Half-Dragon and Coffin were sent after the killer, with Count unaware it was Ishino until after he was dead. Pincers insists only Coffin can defeat Half-Dragon. Yashiro decides to execute him, but Jogamine decides his loyalty to Coffin is commendable, plus Yashiro is too good a man to murder an unarmed prisoner, so she throws Pincers out the window. Yashiro is furious, but Levi arrives with Tomoe, Seki and Drit. Yashiro decides to wait to fight Levi; sending Indo against Drit, Sara against Seki and Jogamine against Tomoe. Indo comes up with a way to stab Drit so only her knives go through her portals while her body remains a safe distance away. Her last attack severs Drit's head. Yashiro rewards her with more head pats and decides her Brave nickname will be "Nine Fingers". Sara recalls first realising her father was against her being a Brave when he broke her arm during sword practise, causing her to feel fear in battle. As Seki can walk in midair, Sara forces him down by jumping over his head, shattering his sword and cutting off his leg. Yashiro praises her for finally realising she was strong enough to win all along, once she decided not to be afraid anymore.
22	"A Brave's Ideal"; Transliteration: "Yūsha no Risō" (Japanese: 勇者の理想)	Fumio Itou & Kōji Fukazawa	Minoru Ōhara	Kenji Ota, Ippei Ichii & Hiroko Kūrube	June 14, 2026
Yashiro warns the girls not to help Jogamine or she will not learn anything. Jogamine continues to avoid killing blows. Yashiro suspects there is only one way she can win; a stupid way he would never use himself. He is proven right when Jogamine lets herself be stabbed so she can steal Tomoe's spear then beat her unconscious. Yashiro attacks Levi and cuts off her hand, pointing out she got lazy from only fighting weak opponents. Levi admits Half-Dragon created E4 from a desperate attempt to unlock biological immortality, but so few people are E4 compatible the project is a near total failure. She suddenly claims Jogamine is a doll and tries to stab her, but she is shot through the leg by Tetsu, who arrived with Malta and Ayashima. Malta bets Yashiro they will kill Coffin before Yashiro does. Yashiro accepts, then cheats by leaving them to fight a pack of Nephilim. Yashiro and the girls confront Coffin, who insists she only wants the world to remain in order, so if they insist on being heroes it makes more sense to work for her. Coffin suddenly uses telekinesis to manipulate suits of armour around the room, overwhelming them and impaling Indo through the stomach.
23	"A Brave's Truth"; Transliteration: "Yūsha no Shinjitsu" (Japanese: 勇者の真実)	Masatsune Oi	Takeshi Mori & Naohito Takahashi	Toshiaki Ohashi	June 21, 2026
Jogamine insists Yashiro will win as he is righteous, making Coffin laugh at her naivety. Yashiro notices the swords stop moving when Coffin is not paying attention. Coffin refuses to be lectured by Kiyohito's doll, revealing Jogamine is Kiyohito's demented science experiment; body parts from corpses brought to life by E4, with a manufactured personality and the implanted memories of Kiyohito's deceased daughter. Jogamine reveals she knows all this as she began reading Kiyohito's mind the moment he created her, so she knows he had good intentions. Jogamine suddenly reveals to Yashiro how Coffin controls objects. Coffin visualises wind-up keys on objects that she can programme with basic instructions. With the key wound up, the objects move as instructed until the key winds down. Yashiro moves so fast even Coffin cannot see him, and wounds her. Jogamine insists Coffin be made to pay for her crimes. Yashiro gives her choices; he kills her quickly, or they wait for Joe who will make it slow and painful, or she bribes him with pizza and beer. Later, Yashiro infiltrates the academy to see Arthur. Arthur admits he has the same danger sense as Sara, except his lets him sense threats in the future. He admits he is the leader of Half-dragon.
24	"A Brave's Lie"; Transliteration: "Yūsha no Uso" (Japanese: 勇者の嘘)	Fumio Itou	Naohito Takahashi	Hiroko Kūrube	June 28, 2026
Yashiro confronts Arthur, having long suspected he controlled the underworld to keep Demon Lords in check. Arthur is grateful Coffin failed to capture Jogamine, which would have given her influence over both him and Half-Dragon. He admits he sent Levi to test Yashiro's loyalty and accepts partial responsibility for Ishino's death. Arthur defends his actions, arguing it controls Demon Lords and provides murderous Braves with enemies to fight to keep them from turning to worse crime. Furious, Yashiro tries and fails to punch him, declaring that while Braves are scum, Arthur has no right to say it. Arthur agrees to keep portraying Braves as heroes to give academy students hope, and maybe one day become hero Braves themselves. Yashiro returns to Ed's Bar, where a surgically depowered Coffin now works as a waitress; Yashiro having paid for her surgery and falsely claiming to have implanted a bomb in her chest to ensure her good behaviour. Joe and Malta arrive with Kazuma, a pathetic young Brave they rescued after a failed casino robbery. Yashiro takes Kazuma as his fourth apprentice, outraging Jogamine. When casino thugs storm the bar Yashiro easily defeats them, concluding that while Braves are scum, being one isn't so bad.

== Reception ==
The novel won the Grand Prize in the Modern Action category at the 1st Kakuyomu Web Novel Contest in 2016.

== See also ==
- Sentenced to Be a Hero, another light novel series written by Rocket Shokai
