= How I Became King by Eating Monsters =

Japanese light novel series

- First light novel volume cover

モンスターの肉を食っていたら王位に就いた件 (Monsutā no Niku o Kutte Itara Ōi no Tsuita Ken)
- Genre: Fantasy
- Novel series
- Written by: Daken
- Published by: Shōsetsuka ni Narō
- Original run: January 5, 2022 – January 4, 2023
- Light novel
- Written by: Daken
- Illustrated by: Shiba
- Published by: Micro Magazine
- English publisher: NA: Cross Infinite World
- Imprint: GCN Bunko
- Original run: September 29, 2023 – present
- Volumes: 7
- Manga
- Written by: Daken
- Illustrated by: Karin Suzuragi
- Published by: Hakusensha
- Imprint: Young Animal Comics
- Magazine: Young Animal Zero
- Original run: January 9, 2024 – present
- Volumes: 3
- Anime television series
- Studio: White Fox
- Original run: 2027 – scheduled

How I Became King by Eating Monsters (Japanese: モンスターの肉を食っていたら王位に就いた件, Hepburn: Monsutā no Niku o Kutte Itara Ōi no Tsuita Ken) is a Japanese light novel series written by Daken and illustrated by Shiba. It was originally serialized as a web novel on the online publication platform Shōsetsuka ni Narō from January 2022 to January 2023. Micro Magazine later began publishing it as a light novel under its GCN Bunko imprint in September 2023, with seven volumes released as of October 2026. A manga adaptation illustrated by Karin Suzuragi began serialization in Hakusensha's Young Animal Zero magazine in January 2024, and has been compiled into three volumes as of October 2026. An anime television series adaptation produced by White Fox is set to premiere in 2027.

== Plot ==
Mars, the only prince of the Kingdom of Farune, has lived in fear of being poisoned by his food, driven by the prime minister's threats against his life. Being paranoid about his meals, he goes outside to eat monster meat. One night, a mysterious red haired woman discovers him and offers to make him her apprentice. She turns out to be Cassandra, a well-known warrior, who informs him that eating monster meat makes him stronger. With this newfound knowledge, Mars aims to get stronger, training under Cassandra and gaining strength to defeat his opponents.

== Characters ==
Mars (マルス, Marusu)
A 12-year-old prince and the heir to the throne of Farune. He lives in fear following the death of his mother and the prime minister's repeated attempts to kill him to take over the country, with him avoiding meals to avoid being poisoned.
Cassandra (カサンドラ, Kasandora)
Nicknamed the Red Warrior, a name she dislikes, she is a red-haired warrior who encounters Mars one day. Impressed by his ability to eat poisoned monster meat, she offers to train him to get stronger.

== Media ==
=== Light novels ===
Daken originally serialized the series on the online publication platform Shōsetsuka ni Narō, releasing 53 chapters between January 5, 2022, and January 4, 2023. It was later picked up for publication by Micro Magazine, which began publishing it as a light novel under its GCN Bunko imprint, with illustrations by Shiba. The first light novel volume was released on September 29, 2023; seven volumes have been released as of October 20, 2026. The light novels are licensed in English by Cross Infinite World.

No.	Original release date	Original ISBN	English release date	English ISBN
1	September 29, 2023	978-4-867-16472-3	November 30, 2024 (digital); April 16, 2025 (print)	979-8-88560-181-8
2	January 19, 2024	978-4-867-16521-8	April 30, 2025 (digital); September 9, 2025 (print)	979-8-88560-197-9
3	August 21, 2024	978-4-867-16618-5	August 31, 2025 (digital); October 31, 2025 (print)	979-8-88560-200-6
4	January 20, 2025	978-4-867-16700-7	December 31, 2025 (digital); July 19, 2026 (print)	979-8-88560-251-8
5	July 22, 2025	978-4-867-16803-5	April 30, 2026 (digital); August 19, 2026 (print)	979-8-88560-252-5
6	January 20, 2026	978-4-867-16902-5	September 30, 2026 (digital)	—
7	October 20, 2026	978-4-825-00054-4	—	—

=== Manga ===
A manga adaptation illustrated by Karin Suzuragi began serialization in Hakusensha's Young Animal Zero magazine on January 9, 2024. The first tankōbon volume was released on January 29, 2025; three volumes have been released as of October 29, 2026.

No.	Release date	ISBN
1	January 29, 2025	978-4-592-16102-8
2	November 28, 2025	978-4-592-16103-5
3	October 29, 2026	978-4-592-16104-2

=== Anime ===
An anime television series adaptation was announced on October 9, 2026. The series will be produced by White Fox and is set to premiere in 2027.

== See also ==
- Putting a Price on World Peace, another light novel written by Daken
- The Suspects of Necromancy, another light novel written by Daken
- Who Killed the Hero?, another light novel series written by Daken
- The Wicked Princess and Her Twelve Eyes, another light novel series written by Daken
