= My Daughter Left the Nest and Returned an S-Rank Adventurer =

Japanese light novel series

- First light novel volume cover

冒険者になりたいと都に出て行った娘がSランクになってた (Bōkensha ni Naritai to Miyako ni Deteitta Musume ga Esu Ranku ni Natteta)
- Genre: Fantasy
- Novel series
- Written by: Mojikakiya
- Published by: Shōsetsuka ni Narō
- Original run: September 18, 2017 – January 21, 2020
- Light novel
- Written by: Mojikakiya
- Illustrated by: toi8
- Published by: Earth Star Entertainment
- English publisher: NA: J-Novel Club
- Imprint: Earth Star Novel
- Original run: February 15, 2018 – November 16, 2021
- Volumes: 11 + 1
- Manga
- Written by: Mojikakiya
- Illustrated by: Kyū Urushibara
- Published by: Earth Star Entertainment
- English publisher: NA: J-Novel Club
- Imprint: Earth Star Comics
- Magazine: Comic Earth Star
- Original run: May 8, 2018 – present
- Volumes: 10
- Anime television series
- Directed by: Takeshi Mori (Note: Credited as Chief Director (総監督, Sō Kantoku)); Naoki Murata
- Written by: Yūichirō Momose
- Music by: Hitoshi Fujima
- Studio: Typhoon Graphics
- Licensed by: Crunchyroll
- Original network: Tokyo MX, BS NTV, Niigata TV 21, HTB, HAB, NCC, AT-X
- Original run: October 6, 2023 – December 29, 2023
- Episodes: 13
- icon

My Daughter Left the Nest and Returned an S-Rank Adventurer (Japanese: 冒険者になりたいと都に出て行った娘がSランクになってた, Hepburn: Bōkensha ni Naritai to Miyako ni Deteitta Musume ga Esu Ranku ni Natteta; lit. 'My Daughter Who Wanted to Be an Adventurer and Went to the Capital Is Already an S-Rank'), sometimes contracted to S-Rank Musume (Sランク娘; lit. 'S-Rank Daughter'), is a Japanese light novel series written by Mojikakiya and illustrated by toi8. It began as a web novel that was serialized in the Shōsetsuka ni Narō website from September 2017 to January 2020. It was later acquired by Earth Star Entertainment, which published eleven volumes from December 2018 to November 2021 under their Earth Star Novel imprint.

A manga adaptation illustrated by Kyū Urushibara has been serialized on the Comic Earth Star website since May 2018, with its chapters collected into ten tankōbon volumes as of October 2026. An anime television series adaptation produced by Typhoon Graphics aired from October to December 2023.

== Plot ==
After a deadly encounter robs Belgrieve of his leg and the ability to pursue his dreams, he finds an abandoned baby girl Angeline in the wilderness and decides to raise her as his own. After becoming a top-tier adventurer and making a name for herself, fame, fortune and power hold no appeal to the S-rank adventurer when her wish is nothing more than to see her father again.

== Characters ==
Angeline (アンジェリン, Anjerin)
Voiced by: Saori Hayami
An S-ranked adventurer who works in the town of Torrnera. She received training on becoming an adventurer from Belgrieve and became an adventurer, leaving her home village at the age of 12. She became known as the 'Black Haired War Maiden' and formed a party with Miriam and Anessa. She highly respects Belgrieve and constantly talks about his strength, going as far as to give him the nickname 'Red Demon'.
She has the contradictory bad habit of never being able to resist helping others and a dad complex; this leads to Angelina becoming outright vicious when her precious vacation time to go back home is ruined.
Belgrieve (ベルグリフ, Berugurifu)
Voiced by: Junichi Suwabe
A former E-ranked adventurer who had to retire because of an incident that took his right leg. He returned to his home village and helped out in keeping the village safe from monsters, despite his disability. He found Angeline 8 years after losing his leg abandoned in the nearby forest and decided to raise her. He became known as the 'Red Demon', but mainly because Angeline spread this nickname around for him, which he was not too happy with when he found out. Despite his injury, he continues to train his swordsmanship to the point where he is strong enough to defeat a C-ranked monster alone.
Despite Angeline having great power, Belgrieve beats her in matches due to his skill.
Anessa (アネッサ)
Voiced by: Maki Kawase
A member of Angeline's party. The Archer and the eldest of the group.
Miriam (ミリアム, Miriamu)
Voiced by: Rumi Okubo
A member of Angeline's party. The wizard of the group, she hides her cat ears behind her hat.
Helvetica Bordeaux (ヘルベチカ・ボルドー, Herubechika Borudō)
Voiced by: Marina Inoue
Sasha Bordeaux (サーシャ・ボルドー, Sāsha Borudō)
Voiced by: Saku Mizuno
Seren Bordeaux (セレン・ボルドー, Seren Borudō)
Voiced by: Kana Ichinose
Marguerite (マルグリット, Maruguritto)
Voiced by: Fairouz Ai
Graham (グラハム, Gurahamu)
Voiced by: Hōchū Ōtsuka
Charlotte (シャルロッテ, Sharurotte)
Voiced by: Kanon Takao
a member of the Viena Cult, a religious group that praises Solomon.
Byaku (ビャク)
Voiced by: Kazuki Ura
Charlotte's bodyguard.
Ashcroft (アシュクロフト, Ashukurofuto)
Voiced by: Kikunosuke Toya
Lionel (ライオネル, Raioneru)
Voiced by: Tomokazu Sugita
The local guild master. Formerly an adventurer, he's since taken over the guild leadership. Always seen disheveled and eternally exhausted.
Cheborg (チェボルグ, Cheborugu)
Voiced by: Tetsu Inada
The loudmouthed and quite hard of hearing brawler and an old adventurer.
Dortos (ドルトス, Dorutosu)
Voiced by: Yōsuke Akimoto
Well-known master spearman.
Maria (マリア)
Voiced by: Hitomi Nabatame
Miriam's teacher and a wizard. She suffers from consistent cough due to her being cursed by a dying demon she once fought.
Schwartz (シュバイツ, Shubaitsu)
Voiced by: Hiro Shimono
Yūri (ユーリ)
Voiced by: Lynn
Rosetta (ロゼッタ, Rozetta)
Voiced by: Yoshino Nanjō

== Media ==
=== Light novel ===
Written by Mojikakiya, the series began publication online on the Shōsetsuka ni Narō website on September 18, 2017, and ended on January 21, 2020. It was later acquired by Earth Star Entertainment, who published eleven volumes with illustrations by toi8 from February 15, 2018, to November 16, 2021, under their Earth Star Novel imprint.

In July 2021, J-Novel Club announced that they licensed the novels for English publication.

| No. | Original release date | Original ISBN | English release date | English ISBN |
|---|---|---|---|---|
| 1 | February 15, 2018 | 978-4-80-301162-3 | September 8, 2021 | 978-1-71-838298-5 |
| 2 | May 16, 2018 | 978-4-80-301191-3 | November 24, 2021 | 978-1-71-838300-5 |
| 3 | October 16, 2018 | 978-4-80-301237-8 | February 24, 2022 | 978-1-71-838302-9 |
| 4 | February 15, 2019 | 978-4-80-301272-9 | May 11, 2022 | 978-1-71-838304-3 |
| 5 | June 15, 2019 | 978-4-80-301301-6 | July 27, 2022 | 978-1-71-838306-7 |
| 6 | October 17, 2019 | 978-4-80-301350-4 | December 7, 2022 | 978-1-71-838308-1 |
| 7 | February 15, 2020 | 978-4-8030-1390-0 | February 23, 2023 | 978-1-71-838310-4 |
| 8 | May 15, 2020 | 978-4-80-301421-1 | May 11, 2023 | 978-1-71-838312-8 |
| 9 | October 15, 2020 | 978-4-80-301456-3 | August 9, 2023 | 978-1-71-838314-2 |
| 10 | April 15, 2021 | 978-4-80-301512-6 | October 25, 2023 | 978-1-71-838316-6 |
| 11 | November 16, 2021 | 978-4-80-301576-8 | January 24, 2024 | 978-1-71-838318-0 |
| Ex | November 15, 2023 (ebook) | — | December 4, 2024 | 978-1-71-838320-3 |

=== Manga ===
A manga adaptation illustrated by Kyū Urushibara began serialization on the Comic Earth Star website on May 8, 2018. The first tankōbon volume was released on October 16, 2018. As of October 2026, ten volumes have been released.

At Anime Expo 2023, J-Novel Club announced that they also licensed the manga.

| No. | Original release date | Original ISBN | English release date | English ISBN |
|---|---|---|---|---|
| 1 | October 16, 2018 | 978-4-80-301235-4 | September 6, 2023 | 978-1-71-838566-5 |
| 2 | May 11, 2019 | 978-4-80-301292-7 | November 29, 2023 | 978-1-71-838567-2 |
| 3 | November 12, 2019 | 978-4-80-301354-2 | February 21, 2024 | 978-1-71-838568-9 |
| 4 | August 12, 2020 | 978-4-80-301437-2 | May 15, 2024 | 978-1-71-838569-6 |
| 5 | August 12, 2021 | 978-4-80-301546-1 | August 7, 2024 | 978-1-71-838570-2 |
| 6 | November 11, 2022 | 978-4-80-301709-0 | October 30, 2024 | 978-1-71-838571-9 |
| 7 | October 12, 2023 | 978-4-80-301845-5 | January 8, 2025 | 978-1-71-838572-6 |
| 8 | August 9, 2024 | 978-4-80-301993-3 | July 23, 2025 | 978-1-71-838573-3 |
| 9 | August 8, 2025 | 978-4-80-302165-3 | April 15, 2026 | 978-1-71-838574-0 |
| 10 | October 9, 2026 | 978-4-80-302388-6 | — | — |

=== Anime ===
An anime television series adaptation was announced on November 1, 2022. It is produced by Typhoon Graphics and directed by Naoki Murata, with chief direction from Takeshi Mori, scripts written by Yūichirō Momose, and character designs handled by Jun Shibata, who will also serve as chief animation director. The series aired from October 6 to December 29, 2023, on Tokyo MX and other networks. The opening theme song is "Sen" (閃; 'Flash of Light") by Yoshino Nanjō, while the ending theme song is "Homeward Journey" by Nagi Yanagi. Crunchyroll streamed the series outside of Asia.

| No. | Title | Directed by (Note: Information is taken from the ending credits of each episode.) | Written by | Storyboarded by | Original release date (Note: Episodes are released on AT-X and ABEMA a week before their air dates on television.) |
|---|---|---|---|---|---|
| 1 | "The Melancholy of Angeline"; Transliteration: "Anjerin no Yūutsu" (Japanese: アンジェリンの憂鬱) | Naoki Murata | Yūichirō Momose | Takeshi Mori | October 6, 2023 |
Adventurer Belgrieve the Red Ogre loses his leg to a monster and is forced to retire. He finds an abandoned baby near his home in Turnera village and decides to raise her as his daughter Angeline. When she reaches twelve years old Angeline decides to become an adventurer just like Belgrieve, and though he fears for her safety Belgrieve sends her to Orphen city to join the Guild. After five years Angeline becomes famous as Black-Haired Valkyrie, the youngest living S Rank adventurer. After slaying a dragon Angeline decides to go on vacation to visit Belgrieve but is forced to cancel when an urgent job is pushed on her by the guild master, leaving Belgrieve disappointed. Weeks later she finally gets her vacation but while travelling she rescues noble Seren Bordeaux from bandits and is forced to return Seren to her ill father Count Bordeaux, which takes so long her vacation time runs out. Disappointed again Belgrieve distracts himself tutoring the village children in adventuring skills. Angeline's party members archer Anessa and lightning mage Miriam help her feel better. She remains determined to see Belgrieve on her next vacation and sends him many letters describing her adventures.
| 2 | "Belgrieve the Red Ogre"; Transliteration: "Aka Oni no Berugurifu" (Japanese: 赤鬼のベルグリフ) | Tokuji Tanizawa | Yūichirō Momose | Takeshi Mori | October 13, 2023 |
Belgrieve is visited by Sasha Bordeaux, Seren's sister. Thanks to Angeline Seren was able to see her father before he died, but as Angeline refused her reward Sasha gives it to Belgrieve, 100 gold. As she is an AA rank adventurer herself Sasha requests a duel and is swiftly defeated by him. Convinced of his greatness she promises to return to learn more from him, leaving him confused. Due to increasing monster attacks Angeline's vacation is denied again. Rumours spread the 72 Demon Kings may return, immortal homunculi created by the insane sorcerer Solomon. Belgrieve is visited by Helvetica, Seren and Sasha's older sister and now Countess following their father's death. Helvetica insists he serve her family as a warrior, threatening to kidnap him if he refuses. Belgrieve terrifies her soldiers into submission, so she resorts to insisting he marry her instead. Used to Helvetica's childish antics Seren gets her under control before accepting Belgrieve's invitation for everyone to attend the harvest festival. Due to a shortage of adventurers the guild considers asking retired adventurers to resume working, giving Angeline hope she and Belgrieve could go adventuring together. Elsewhere, a strange being manifests in a cave, searching for its lost master.
| 3 | "Welcome Home, Angeline"; Transliteration: "Okaeri, Anjerin" (Japanese: おかえり、アンジェリン) | Mitsuo Hashimoto | Yūichirō Momose | Takeshi Mori | October 20, 2023 |
With the arrival of winter Belgrieve knows Angeline can't visit until spring. With the recall of retired adventurers Angeline meets her old S Rank friends Cheborg the Annihilator, Dortos the Silver and Maria the Dragon Slayer. With the manpower he needed the guild master orders an investigation into the cause of increasing monster activity; a potentially revived demon lord in a nearby dungeon. Entering the dungeon the demon lord appears as a corrupted child named Ba'al, desperately seeking its master and spawning monsters from its rage and misery. Despite its overwhelming power Angeline destroys Ba'al but is injured and faints. Angeline is celebrated for defeating a demon lord. Meanwhile, a sinister sorcerer retrieves Ba'al's remains and deems Angeline a threat to his plans. Angeline finally gets her vacation and visits Turnera with Anessa and Miriam, finally reuniting with Belgrieve who welcomes her home.
| 4 | "Quiet Days in Turnera with the Occasional Family Spat"; Transliteration: "Torunera no Odayaka na Nichijō, Tokidoki Oyakogenka" (Japanese: トルネラの穏やかな日常、時々親子喧嘩) | Yoshihiro Yamaguchi | Nagisa Nario | Takeshi Mori | October 27, 2023 |
The sorcerer is attacked by enemies, allowing a portion of Ba'al's power to escape. Angeline's friends are surprised she reverts to childish behaviours around Belgrieve, clinging to him like a toddler and sulking. Belgrieve learns thanks to Angeline bragging about him he has become famous as the Red Ogre, a title she invented, making him uncomfortable as he feels he didn't rightfully earn such fame. Angeline demands a duel to prove his strength and Anessa and Miriam are amazed when S Rank Angeline loses in a single move. Belgrieve insists Angeline stop calling him Red Ogre. Over dinner Miriam is reluctant to remove her hat due to her Beast-folk ears, since most people have bias against Beast-folk, so she is surprised and happy when Belgrieve does not and even pats her on the head. Belgrieve is concerned the supposed demon lord Angeline defeated sounds familiar to the creature that took his leg. Fearing for her safety, Belgrieve forbids Angeline from adventuring again until she defeats him, even promising to disown her if she disobeys. Forced to fight seriously, Angeline defeats him in a single move, proving her skills have surpassed his. She then forces him to apologise for being mean. Having seen his fierce warrior spirit Miriam and Anessa think Red Ogre suits Belgrieve perfectly.
| 5 | "The Road to Bordeaux"; Transliteration: "Borudō e no Tabiji" (Japanese: ボルドーへの旅路) | Daigo Taniguchi | Yūichirō Momose | Takeshi Mori | November 3, 2023 |
Cultists of Solomon, Byaku and Saintess, attempt to con people for money by speaking out against nobles, then teleport away when confronted by Cheborg and the guild master. Belgrieve is asked to deliver a letter to Helvetica concerning repairs to Turnera's roads, so Angeline demands he visit Orphen with her on the same trip. Arriving in Bordeaux territory Belgrieve encounters Saintess and realises from her clothing she belongs to the Vienna Cult from Lucrecia city. Belgrieve visits Helvetica, joined by Angeline in case Helvetica tries to marry Belgrieve again. Helvetica is happy to help Turnera but Count Malta of Hazel territory is currently holding labourers in his territory as he despises Bordeaux and has grown increasingly unreasonable since Count Bordeaux's death. Without the labourers nothing can be repaired anywhere in the region, including in Turnera. Despite Belgrieve's disinterest in dating Angeline insists Helvetica isn't maternal enough to be her new mother. Ash, a swordsman in service to the Bordeaux's, is dismissive of Belgrieve's swordsmanship and insists his own skills are far superior. Sasha demands he prove it by duelling Belgrieve. Malta decides to attack Bordeaux and seize power from Helvetica, ignoring Byaku's advice to wait until after Belgrieve and Angeline have left.
| 6 | "Rebels Acting in Secret"; Transliteration: "Anyaku Suru Hanran Bunshi" (Japanese: 暗躍する反乱分子) | Mitsuo Hashimoto | Nagisa Nario | Takeshi Mori; Yūichi Abe | November 10, 2023 |
Belgrieve wins his duel against Ash by accident when his prosthetic leg slips in the mud and his sword trips Ash to the ground. Despite Belgrieve admitting it was an accident Ash accepts his defeat and sincerely apologises for his arrogance. Malta orders Saintess to release monsters on Bordeaux territory. Saintess despises Malta as he is the same corrupt nobility as the Pope of the Vienna cult who arranged her parents' deaths to steal their wealth. Left homeless a priest inducted her into the Cult of Solomon then sent her to infiltrate the Vienna cult and bring it down from the inside. He also gave her Samigina's Ring she now uses to summon monsters. Bordeaux's soldiers and adventurers fight the monsters. Ash and Belgrieve defend Helvetica and her sisters. Angeline is nearly defeated by a Darkwalker that invades her mind to cause despair. Saintess drives the monsters away as Malta arrives, claiming he brought his army to assist Bordeaux following the death of Helvetica and her sisters. He is surprised and outraged to learn they all survived but maintains his obviously false helpful attitude. Helvetica is irritated there is no evidence to accuse him of a crime. Angeline is deeply affected by the Darkwalker's mental abilities.
| 7 | "A Long Night and a Bright Dawn"; Transliteration: "Nagai Yoru, Akarui Asayake" (Japanese: 長い夜、明るい朝焼け) | Shigeki Awai | Yūichirō Momose | Takeshi Mori; Yūichi Abe | November 17, 2023 |
Malta concocts a sinister plan to get to Helvetica. While patrolling, Sasha encounters Saintess and Byaku and realizes they are targeting Helvetica. She is almost killed by Byaku's strange magic but is saved by Ash and Angeline. Recognizing Belgrieve's name, Byaku identifies Angeline as being the same type of creature as himself, then teleports away. Having snuck away during the fight Saintess summons undead to attack the Bordeaux mansion and furiously attacks Belgrieve herself when he keeps protecting Helvetica. Helvetica blames herself for ignoring Malta until it was too late. She decides she must become a stronger leader, so when her father's undead corpse is sent to kill her and Seren, like Malta planned; she slays him herself to prove her resolve. Samigina's ring almost consumes the terrified Saintess, until Belgrieve rescues her by destroying it. Upset but grateful she thanks Belgrieve before leaving with Byaku. Malta attempts to flee, but the more serious Helvetica has him quietly assassinated. With the danger passed, Belgrieve decides to return to Turnera while Angeline returns to the guild in Orphen to resume working. Angeline is furious when Helvetica sneaks a kiss with a shocked Belgrieve and repeats her desire to marry him one day.
| 8 | "Meeting the Inhabitants of the Woods"; Transliteration: "Mori no Jūnin to no Kaikō" (Japanese: 森の住人との邂逅) | Ippei Ichii | Yūichirō Momose | Takeshi Mori | November 24, 2023 |
A female elf confronts another creature in the woods, searching for its Master. Belgrieve has taken in a lodger, Duncan, an adventurer considering retiring to find a wife. After defending Turnera from monsters with Duncan and some of the older children Belgrieve is saddened they will soon go off to become adventurers while he grows older and less capable. A second elf, Graham the Paladin, arrives seeking the female elf, his grand-niece princess Marguerite, daughter of Elven King Oberon who ran away to slay the returning Demon Kings. The increase in monsters around Turnera is a sign of a Demon King, so Graham plans to wait for Marguerite to appear before she gets herself killed. Angeline is lonely, but when Miriam suggests she find a boyfriend Angeline decides instead to find a wife for Belgrieve so he won't be lonely. Her first option is Yuri, a retired adventurer turned guild secretary, but worries she is not motherly enough after seeing her punish guildmaster Leo. Next is Rosetta who runs an orphanage and is definitely motherly. Marguerite finally appears in Turnera but runs away on seeing Graham. While planning a matchmaking party for Belgrieve Angeline spots and confronts Byaku and Saintess in Orphen.
| 9 | "Father and Daughter Meet New People"; Transliteration: "Oyako, Sorezore no Deai" (Japanese: 親子、それぞれの出会い) | Mitsuo Hashimoto | Nagisa Nario | Takeshi Mori | December 1, 2023 |
Saintess and Byaku convince Angeline they wish to atone for their crimes, just as they are attacked by Inquisitors of the Lucrecian Church. Angeline is forced to kill them before learning from Saintess her late father, a Lucrecian Bishop, was falsely accused of heresy and assassinated by the Inquisition. Everything she has done was for revenge, but she has decided to abandon revenge after Belgrieve saved her. Angeline decides to escort them to Helvetica in Bordeaux to apologise. Marguerite confronts the child-like resurrected Demon King, until Belgrieve forces her to retreat, having realised it truly is a child, reacting violently to Marguerite's attacks but becoming non-threatening once they leave. Marguerite resents them interfering and runs away from Graham again. Belgrieve convinces her to return so she and Graham can both apologise. Leo fears crossing the church now Angeline has confirmed the existence of the rumoured Inquisition, but agrees Angeline can bodyguard Saintess. Miasma begins to affect Turnera, yet Belgrieve and Marguerite find it comes not from the Demon King, but a mutated monster. Fleeing with the sick Demon King Graham confirms while the child has Demon King magic his body is human. Belgrieve makes the surprise decision to raise the child himself, though is unsure how Angeline will react to having a sibling.
| 10 | "Wriggling Malice"; Transliteration: "Ugomeku Akui" (Japanese: 蠢く悪意) | Yukio Nishimoto | Yūichirō Momose | Takeshi Mori; Yūichi Abe | December 8, 2023 |
The sorcerer returns Ba'al to his king, who is curious where the missing portion went. Angeline continues to care for Byaku and Saintess, now going by her real name Charlotte. Maria agrees to tutor them in magic. Many citizens swindled by Charlotte object to letting them stay in the city, but are sent away by Rosetta. Charlotte rejects Rosetta's kindness due to her being a nun of Vienna. Hypnotized soldiers attack Charlotte and Rosetta is hurt protecting her. They escape to the guild but the soldiers follow them. The adventurers hold them back while Angeline locates and slays the Inquisitors controlling the soldiers. Disappointed by the results, the sorcerer frees Ba'al in the city. Byaku scolds Angeline for trying to take responsibility alone as she recklessly attacks Ba'al, forcing Byaku to use his strange magic again. Recognising her own foolishness, Angeline takes the fight more seriously and defeats Ba'al, impressing the sorcerer. He is confronted by Maria who recognises him before he escapes. She decides to investigate what he is planning. Realising she misjudged her Charlotte apologises to Rosetta. Belgrieve continues to care for the boy. Marguerite questions why he never married when raising Angeline, causing him to fondly remember a woman from his past.
| 11 | "Belgrieve's Decision"; Transliteration: "Berugurību no ketsudan" (Japanese: ベルグリーブの決断) | Shigeki Awai | Nagisa Nario | Takeshi Mori | December 15, 2023 |
Belgrieve's dreams reveal the monster that took his leg was the same type as Ba'al. Maria trains Byaku to fight with his own mana, lest his strange Demon King mana damage his body. Without Samigina's ring Charlotte feels defenceless and considers learning real magic. Angeline decides to take them both to visit Belgrieve. Guildmaster Lionel receives a worrying letter. In Turnera Marguerite plans to leave after Fall Festival to continue adventuring before snow stops travel over winter. Duncan plans likewise, wanting one last adventure before retirement and marriage. Lionel informs Angeline Grand Duke Estogal has demanded her presence to reward her for defeating Ba'al, meaning visiting Belgrieve will be delayed until after winter. Lionel senses Estogal has political motives for bestowing the reward, but is unable to do about it. Angeline begrudgingly decides to go, unwilling to upset Belgrieve if he doesn't and decides to go alone, leaving Charlotte and Byaku in Orphen with Anessa and Miriam. Belgrieve gets Marguerite a job guarding a travelling merchant who will be travelling to Orphen after the festival. Belgrieve wants to resolve matters from his past left unresolved and reluctantly leaves the boy, Mit, with Graham so he can go travelling. Angeline sets out with support from fellow adventurer Gil. Belgrieve recalls voluntarily leaving his party members after losing his leg, not wanting to slow them down. One member, Kasim, is currently imprisoned by a noble family.
| 12 | "Confronting the Past"; Transliteration: "Kako to Taiji Suru" (Japanese: 過去と対峙する) | Yoshihide Ibata | Yūichirō Momose | Takeshi Mori | December 22, 2023 |
Angeline meets Estogal's arrogant son, Villard, who only invited Angeline as a way of earning his father's approval over his older brother Fernand. She shares her dislikes of nobles, claiming they are not to be underestimated. Gil manages to infiltrate as a maid and informs Angeline Estogal has a third son, Francois, and a daughter, Liselotte. Liselotte shows Angeline Kasim imprisoned beneath the castle and Angeline comments his skills are wasted getting drunk in a cell. Belgrieve and Marguerite arrive at the guild and learn Angeline has been interviewing women to become his wife, though everyone tries to hide it from him to no avail. Belgrieve asks around for his former teammates. Swordsman Percival is away adventuring; Kasim works as a mage but is currently missing, and elf Satie quit adventuring and presumably returned home. Miriam believes Satie is Belgrieve's absent sweetheart. Cheborg and Dortos invite Belgrieve to duel them, and he only narrowly loses to the impressed Cheborg. Angeline meets Fernand, a flirtatious playboy, and Francois, the self-appointed head of security. Angeline is exasperated all three brothers have off-putting personalities and, losing her patience with them, can't wait to finally go home. In his cell, Kasim ponders if Angeline was right about him.
| 13 | "I'm Home, Dad"; Transliteration: "Tadaima, Otōsan" (Japanese: ただいま、お父さん) | Naoki Murata | Yūichirō Momose | Takeshi Mori | December 29, 2023 |
Angeline runs afoul of Francois. She meets Prince Benjamin, whom Villard is desperate to impress. Francois interrupts the reward ceremony, accuses her of faking her defeat of the demon lord and demands she prove her skills by defeating the adventurer Sky-Shatterer; aka Kasim. Finally had enough of his arrogance, Angeline scolds him and refuses to display her abilities for the amusement of bored nobles and Estogal agrees it is unnecessary. Angeline receives her reward while Francois is humiliated. Later, Benjamin suggests Francois should assassinate Angeline, since she is just another commoner. Kasim agrees to do it as he is tired of life and doesn't care which of them dies. As she leaves, Francois ambushes her and has Kasim fight her to the death. During the fight, Angeline mentions being trained by her father Belgrieve, causing Kasim to stop fighting as he reveals that Belgrieve is one of his former teammates. When Francois protests, Kasim punishes him and his men with his explosives. With the nobles dealt with, Kasim decides to leave with Angeline to see Belgrieve. Benjamin meets with the sorcerer, whose name is Schwartz, revealing he isn't the real Benjamin but a magically disguised imposter, disappointed Angeline is still alive. Angeline reunites with Belgrieve in Orphen. Kasim finds Belgrieve doesn't hold a grudge about the past or his leg, and begins to recover from his depression. Angeline shows off the dress Liselotte gave her, surprising Belgrieve that Angeline is growing up, but he still scolds her for trying to secretly find him a wife.
