= Who Killed the Hero? =

Japanese light novel series

- First light novel volume cover

誰が勇者を殺したか (Dare ga Yūsha o Koroshita ka)
- Genre: Fantasy, mystery
- Novel series
- Written by: Daken
- Published by: Shōsetsuka ni Narō
- Original run: February 1, 2023 – September 29, 2023
- Light novel
- Written by: Daken
- Illustrated by: toi8
- Published by: Kadokawa Shoten
- English publisher: NA: Yen Press
- Imprint: Kadokawa Sneaker Bunko
- Original run: September 29, 2023 – present
- Volumes: 4
- Manga
- Written by: Daken
- Illustrated by: Akira Ishida
- Published by: Kadokawa Shoten
- English publisher: NA: Yen Press
- Magazine: KadoComi
- Original run: August 1, 2024 – present
- Volumes: 2

Who Killed the Hero? (Japanese: 誰が勇者を殺したか, Hepburn: Dare ga Yūsha o Koroshita ka) is a Japanese light novel series written by Daken and illustrated by toi8. It was serialized as a web novel published on the user-generated novel publishing website Shōsetsuka ni Narō from February to September 2023. It was later acquired by Kadokawa Shoten who began publishing it under their Kadokawa Sneaker Bunko light novel imprint in September 2023. A manga adaptation illustrated by Akira Ishida began serialization on Kadokawa's KadoComi manga website in August 2024.

== Media ==
=== Light novel ===
Written by Daken, Who Killed the Hero? was initially serialized on the user-generated novel publishing website Shōsetsuka ni Narō form February 1 to September 29, 2023. Kadokawa Shoten acquired the series and began publishing it with illustrations by toi8 under their Kadokawa Sneaker Bunko light novel imprint on September 29, 2023. Four volumes have been released as of May 2026.

In December 2024, Yen Press announced that they licensed the series for English publication.

No.	Original release date	Original ISBN	English release date	English ISBN
1	September 29, 2023	978-4-04-114184-7	June 10, 2025	979-8-8554-0871-3
2	August 1, 2024	978-4-04-115230-0	November 25, 2025	979-8-8554-2192-7
3	May 30, 2025	978-4-04-116257-6	July 14, 2026	979-8-8554-3405-7
4	May 29, 2026	978-4-04-117459-3	—	—

=== Manga ===
A manga adaptation illustrated by Akira Ishida began serialization on Kadokawa Shoten's KadoComi manga website on August 1, 2024. The manga's chapters have been collected into two tankōbon volumes as of November 2026.

In November 2026, Yen Press announced that they also licensed the manga adaptation for English publication.

No.	Release date	ISBN
1	July 7, 2025	978-4-04-811540-7
2	November 6, 2026	978-4-04-811952-8

== Reception ==
The series was ranked fourth in the bunkobon category at the 2023 Next Light Novel Awards. It was also ranked second in the 2025 edition of Takarajimasha's Kono Light Novel ga Sugoi! guidebook in the bunkobon category and first in the new work category.

The series has over 200,000 copies in circulation.

== See also ==
- How I Became King by Eating Monsters, another light novel series written by Daken
- Putting a Price on World Peace, another light novel written by Daken
- The Suspects of Necromancy, another light novel written by Daken
- The Wicked Princess and Her Twelve Eyes, another light novel series written by Daken
