= The Wicked Princess and Her Twelve Eyes =

Japanese light novel series

- The Wicked Princess and Her Twelve Eyes: The Legendary Villainess and Her Assassins
- First light novel volume cover

悪の令嬢と十二の瞳 〜最強従者たちと伝説の悪女、人生二度目の華麗なる無双録〜 (Aku no Reijō to Jūni no Hitomi: Saikyō Jūsha-tachi to Densetsu no Akujo, Jinsei Nidome no Kareinaru Musō-roku)
- Genre: Fantasy
- Novel series
- Written by: Daken
- Published by: Shōsetsuka ni Narō
- Original run: August 11, 2023 – September 7, 2023
- Light novel
- Written by: Daken
- Illustrated by: Saino
- Published by: Overlap
- English publisher: NA: Seven Seas Entertainment
- Imprint: Overlap Novels
- Original run: July 25, 2024 – present
- Volumes: 1
- Manga
- Written by: Daken
- Illustrated by: Mugi Sawai
- Published by: Overlap
- Imprint: Gardo Comics
- Magazine: Comic Gardo
- Original run: July 4, 2025 – present
- Volumes: 2

The Wicked Princess and Her Twelve Eyes: The Legendary Villainess and Her Assassins (悪の令嬢と十二の瞳 〜最強従者たちと伝説の悪女、人生二度目の華麗なる無双録〜, Aku no Reijō to Jūni no Hitomi: Saikyō Jūsha-tachi to Densetsu no Akujo, Jinsei Nidome no Kareinaru Musō-roku) is a Japanese light novel series written by Daken and illustrated by Saino. It was initially serialized as a web novel on Shōsetsuka ni Narō between August and September 2023. It was later acquired by Overlap who began releasing it under their Overlap Novels imprint in July 2024. A manga adaptation illustrated by Mugi Sawai began serialization on Overlap's Comic Gardo website in July 2025.

== Synopsis ==
Serena Rosenberg had her engagement to the prince cancelled due to being charged of a crime she believed she did not commit. In her view, it was due to a misunderstanding. As a result of being charged, she was executed via poisoning. However, Serena resets to before the events of the crime. Serena later discovers that what led to her death wasn't the result of her planning, but the result of not having any competent servants. So she decides adopt some orphans and make them go through hard training in order to become her fiercely loyal assassins.

== Media ==
=== Light novel ===
Written by Daken, The Wicked Princess and Her Twelve Eyes: The Legendary Villainess and Her Assassins was initially serialized on Shōsetsuka ni Narō from August 11, to September 7, 2023. It was later acquired by Overlap who are releasing the series with illustrations by Saino under their Overlap Novels light novel imprint. A single volume has been released as of July 25, 2024. The series is licensed in English by Seven Seas Entertainment.

No.	Original release date	Original ISBN	North American release date	North American ISBN
1	July 25, 2024	978-4-8240-0885-5	October 16, 2025 (digital); November 11, 2025 (print)	979-8-89561-224-8
1. "A Second Shot at Life"; 2. "The Daily Lives of the Squire Candidated"; 3. "Together with My Squires"; 4. "Conquest"; 5. "The Academy"; 6. "Ceremony"; 7. Final Chapters; 8. Epilogue
2	December 20, 2026	978-4-8240-1976-9	—	—

=== Manga ===
A manga adaptation illustrated by Mugi Sawai began serialization on Overlap's Comic Gardo website on July 4, 2025. The manga's chapters have been compiled into two tankōbon volumes as of May 2026.

No.	Release date	ISBN
1	October 25, 2025	978-4-8240-1382-8
2	May 8, 2026	978-4-8240-1619-5
3	December 8, 2026	978-4-8240-1952-3

== Reception ==
The manga adaptation was ranked 17th in the seventh Sanyodo Bookstore Comic Awards in 2026.

== See also ==
- How I Became King by Eating Monsters, another light novel series written by Daken
- Putting a Price on World Peace, another light novel written by Daken
- The Suspects of Necromancy, another light novel written by Daken
- Who Killed the Hero?, another light novel series written by Daken
