= Isekai Cheat Magician =

Japanese light novel series and its franchise

- First light novel volume cover of Isekai Cheat Magician featuring Rin Azuma (left) and Taichi Nishimura (right)

異世界チート魔術師 (Isekai Chīto Majishan)
- Genre: Action, fantasy, isekai
- Novel series
- Written by: Takeru Uchida
- Published by: Shōsetsuka ni Narō
- Original run: April 6, 2012 – present
- Light novel
- Written by: Takeru Uchida
- Illustrated by: Nardack
- Published by: Shufunotomo
- Imprint: Hero Bunko
- Original run: June 28, 2013 – present
- Volumes: 17
- Manga
- Written by: Takeru Uchida
- Illustrated by: Karin Suzuragi
- Published by: Kadokawa Shoten
- Magazine: Monthly Shōnen Ace
- Original run: December 26, 2016 – present
- Volumes: 21
- Manga

Soreyuke! Isekai Chīto Majishan
- Written by: Takeru Uchida
- Illustrated by: Taku Kawamura
- Published by: Kadokawa Shoten
- Magazine: Monthly Shōnen Ace
- Original run: August 25, 2018 – October 26, 2019
- Volumes: 2
- Anime television series
- Directed by: Daisuke Tsukushi
- Written by: Takayo Ikami
- Music by: Yoshiaki Fujisawa
- Studio: Encourage Films
- Licensed by: NA: Crunchyroll
- Original network: AT-X, Tokyo MX, KBS, SUN, TVA, BS11
- English network: SEA: Animax Asia
- Original run: July 10, 2019 – September 25, 2019
- Episodes: 12 + OVA

Isekai Cheat Magician (異世界チート魔術師(マジシャン), Isekai Chīto Majishan; "Another World Cheat Magician") is a Japanese light novel series written by Takeru Uchida and illustrated by Nardack. The series began as a web novel series on the Shōsetsuka ni Narō website in 2012. It was then acquired by Shufunotomo beginning in 2013; seventeen volumes have been published as of September 2024. A manga adaptation by Karin Suzuragi began serialization in Kadokawa Shoten's Monthly Shōnen Ace magazine in December 2016, with twenty-one tankōbon volumes released so far. An anime television series adaptation by Encourage Films aired from July to September 2019. In October 2019, Crunchyroll started showing the dubbed version.

== Plot ==
Taichi Nishimura and Rin Azuma (Note: Rin's first name was originally Kanade. However, on July 16, 2019, the web novel was revised where her name was changed in order to align with the manga and anime. Additionally, all subsequent publications of the light novel refer to her as Rin.) are two ordinary high school students who also happen to be childhood friends. On the way to school, a magic circle appears beneath their feet, and Taichi and Rin both get mysteriously transported to another world called Altianutz. While trying to grasp their current situation, they get attacked by a vicious monster. Luckily, a group of adventurers comes to their aid and rescues them. After arriving at a nearby town, they decide to enroll as adventurers themselves. While enrolling, they discover that they possess incredibly powerful magic and physical prowess. Thus, their adventure begins as the most powerful "cheat magicians". However, as Taichi is forced to discover, his presence in Altia was willed by a mysterious woman who wishes to use his power to control the fate of this world.

== Characters ==
=== Main characters ===
Taichi Nishimura (西村 太一, Nishimura Taichi)
Voiced by: Kōhei Amasaki (Japanese); Griffin Puatu (English)
A 15-year-old high school student and role-playing game fan blessed with good reflexes but lacking ambition. He is able to keep a clear head in a crisis situation, and is very optimistic and kind, even to the point of self-sacrifice. When he is displaced into Altia, he gains tremendous magical abilities (his magical capacity level is measured at 120,000, his magical power level at 40,000), ranking him as a natural (and very rare) Unique Magician who can directly tap into the elemental magical forces (as opposed to a normal Magician, who has to chant an incantation in order to make use of them). His specialty magic is being a Summoner who can directly call upon elemental spirits - in his case, Aerial - and their powers. Because of his power level giving him such a distinct advantage over most opponents, he considers himself a "cheat" Magician; hence the series' name.
Rin Azuma (吾妻 凛, Azuma Rin)
Voiced by: Rie Takahashi (Japanese); Lizzie Freeman (English)
Taichi's agemate, schoolmate and childhood friend, who has long been harboring a one-sided crush on him, as he never felt the same for her. She is a very smart girl and has black hair (auburn in the manga and anime) which she keeps tied in a ponytail. After being displaced into Altia, she also gains high-ranking magical powers and becomes a rare Quad Magician (capacity 37,000, power 5,000) with the ability to use all of the basic four elemental forces Earth, Fire, Wind and Water. Although her overall magical capability is lower than Taichi's, she is able to apply her knowledge in physics to her magical manifestations, making her very versatile.
Lemia Santacru (レミーア・サンタクル, Remīa Santakuru)
Voiced by: Sayaka Ohara (Japanese); Tara Sands (English)
A female master Triple Magician (capacity 43,000, power 6,000) capable of using Fire, Water, and Wind. She is known by the title "Mage of Fallen Leaves" (落葉の魔術師; Rakuyō no majutsushi). She becomes Taichi and Rin's mentor after discovering their extraordinary magical powers.
Myula (ミューラ, Myūra)
Voiced by: Minami Tanaka (Japanese); Laura Stahl (English)
An Elf and a former apprentice of Lemia, she is a Dual Magician (capacity 30,500, power 3,800) capable of using the magical elements Fire and Earth. She is known under the title "Golden Swordswoman" for her skill with the blade. Impressed with Rin's abilities, the two girls become fast friends.
Airy (エアリィ, Earyi) / Aerial (エアリアル, Eariaru) / Sylphy (シルフィ, Shirufi) / Sylphid (シルフィード, Shirufīdo)
Voiced by: Yurika Kubo (Japanese); Tara Sands (English)
The Queen of Wind spirits who becomes bonded to Taichi. Originally she introduces herself as a simple Wind spirit named Aerial, but as Taichi's power rises, she finally evolves into her true identity.

=== Kingdom of Eristein ===
Gilmar Eristein (ジルマール・エリステイン, Jirumāru Erisutein)
Voiced by: Hiroshi Yanaka
The king of Eristein, and an old acquaintance of Lemia. Due to his cosmopolitan plans to share Eristein's magical talents with the other neighboring realms, he has been challenged by traditionalist hardliners, like his brother Duke Dortesheim, who wish to preserve their country's superiority in magical prowess. In order to quell the looming civil war, he ordered the summoning of a being from another world who wields greater power than any other Magician in Altia - an individual who happens to be Taichi.
Charlotte Eristein (シャルロット・エリステイン, Sharurotto Erisutein)
Voiced by: Rie Suegara
King Gilmar's daughter and the second royal princess of Eristein. A Unique Magician capable of manipulating time and space, it was she who summoned Taichi - and, by accident, Rin - to her world upon her father's order.
Ephtihia (エフティヒア, Efutihia)
King Gilmar's elder daughter, Charlotte's older sister, and Eristein's first princess who is a strong Water Magician and healer.
Arcena Norman (アルセナ・ノーマン, Arusena Nōman)
Voiced by: Saori Ōnishi
The daughter of Marquis Norman and a trusted retainer to King Gilmar and Princess Charlotte. She is also the designated archbishop of the Leija Church, a widespread religion of beneficence founded on the deeds of a canonized martyr named Leicia, and considered a saint by the Eristein populace.
Smyera Gaya (スミェーラ・ガーヤ, Sumyēra Gāya)
Voiced by: Marina Inoue
The female high commander of King Gilmar's forces. After a practice fight with Taichi, she takes an instant liking to him and even boldly proposes to him.
Bella Lafuma (ベラ・ラフマ, Bera Rafuma)
Voiced by: Yurika Aizawa^{Ep. 8 credits} (Japanese); Cristina Vee (English)
King Gilmar's court magician, who is a Triple Magician controlling Fire, Earth and Water.
Hans (ハンス, Hansu)
A young, talented magician at the royal court who is both awed and depressed by Rin and Myura's magical potential.
Balda (バラダー, Baradā), Raquelta (ラケルタ, Rakeruta), and Mejila (メヒリャ, Mehirya)
Voiced by: Takanori Kino [Balda], Atsushi Tamaru [Raquelta], and Ayaka Nanase [Mejila]^{Ep. 1 credits} (Japanese); Spike Spencer [Balda, Raquelta] and Cristina Vee [Mejila] (English)
A trio of high-ranking professional adventurers who save Taichi and Rin when they initially arrive in Altia and become their first friends.
Gerard Bogard (ジェラード・ボガード, Jerādo Bogādo)
Voiced by: Ayaka Nanase^{Ep. 1 credits}
A Dwarf and the master of the Azpire Adventurers Guild.
Marie (マリエ)
Voiced by: Yuna Kamakura^{Ep. 1 credits} (Japanese); Cristina Vee (English)
The Azpire Adventurers Guild's receptionist.
Almeda (アルメダ, Arumeda)
Voiced by: Chikago Sugimura^{Ep. 3 credits}
A young innkeeper's daughter from Azpire who befriends Taichi and Rin when they lodge into her parents' inn after becoming official adventurers.
Anastasia (アナスタシア, Anasutashia)
Voiced by: Ayumi Mano (Japanese); Cassandra Lee Morris (English)
A female assassin who attacked Taichi and Rin while they were investigating a case for the Adventurers Guild in the city of Azpire. Captured by them, and with her life spared by Taichi, she renounces her profession and becomes a guild member, and forms a crush on Taichi for his compassion. Shortly afterwards she dies in a battle against a monster horde attacking Azpire, thereby helping Taichi to discover his true potential and strengthen his resolve to keep his friends and loved ones safe.
Miro (ミロ, Miro) and Mero (メロ, Mero)
Voiced by: Hina Kino
Two young twin Magicians specializing in the Earth element.

=== Antagonists ===
Lodra (ロドラ, Rodora)
Voiced by: Daisuke Hirakawa
The main antagonist to Taichi and Rin in the series. Officially the high cardinal of Eristein, he and his mistress, Lady Shade, pursue their own mysterious agenda with the two world-stranded teenagers.
Shade (シェード, Shēdo)
Voiced by: Hitomi Nabatame
The Spirit Queen of Darkness who engineered Taichi's displacement to Altia in order to use his power to take control of that world's fate.
Cassim (カシム, Kashimu)
Voiced by: Hiro Shimono (Japanese); Landon McDonald (English)
A prideful young Magician and servant to Lodra who first meets Taichi and Rin posing as a fruit farmer while really hindering the real farmers' efforts in selling their produce. He specializes in summoning and controlling elemental spirits, and is a Crimson Pact Magician who uses the blood of living beings to imbue other creatures with power. After Taichi deprives him of his arm during their first fight, he begins to seek revenge on him. But after challenging Taichi to a duel, which was secretly rigged by Lodra and Shade, the two of them end up working together to destroy a shadow creature threatening them both, evoking Cassim's grudging respect for Taichi.
Grammy (グラミ, Gurami)
Voiced by: Yoko Hikasa
A slightly unbalanced female Crimson Pact Magician and partner of Cassim who is always eager on engaging her enemies in single combat. Despite this, she has a warped sense of honor, despising underhanded methods like assassination in lieu of facing her opponents face-to-face. She specializes in Wind magic.
Dortesheim (ドルトエスハイム, Dorutoesuhaimu)
Voiced by: Jiro Saito
King Gilmar's younger brother. Displeased with his brother's open-minded politics, he has instigated a rebellion to seize the throne of Eristein, unaware that he is being used as a puppet by Lodra and his followers.
Inimicus (イニミークス, Inimīkusu)
Voiced by: Satoshi Hino
Duke Dortesheim's corrupt advisor who is secretly in league with Lady Shade's goals.

=== Others ===
Takashi Onodera (小野寺 貴史, Onodera Takashi)
Taichi and Rin's high school friend, and a natural athlete. He has long harbored a crush on Rin, and is therefore disappointed when he realizes that her heart belongs solely to Taichi. In the novels' prologue, he bears witness to Taichi and Rin's displacement into another world. He makes no appearance in the anime series.

== Media ==
=== Light novels ===
The series was first published online on the Shōsetsuka ni Narō website in April 2012 by Takeru Uchida. It was later acquired by Shufunotomo, who published the first volume as a light novel under their Hero Bunko imprint in June 2013.

No.	Release date	ISBN
1	June 28, 2013	978-4-07-290972-0
2	December 26, 2013	978-4-07-294220-8
3	April 29, 2014	978-4-07-299163-3
4	September 30, 2015	978-4-07-403070-5
5	May 30, 2016	978-4-07-417668-7
6	June 30, 2017	978-4-07-426236-6
7	December 28, 2017	978-4-07-429080-2
8	May 31, 2018	978-4-07-432610-5
9	March 30, 2019	978-4-07-437079-5
10	June 28, 2019	978-4-07-439575-0
11	September 28, 2019	978-4-07-440561-9
12	March 30, 2020	978-4-07-442838-0
13	September 30, 2020	978-4-07-446026-7
14	February 27, 2021	978-4-07-447942-9
15	October 29, 2021	978-4-07-449711-9
16	January 31, 2024	978-4-07-456705-8
17	September 30, 2024	978-4-07-460836-2

=== Manga ===
A manga adaptation of the series by Karin Suzuragi began publication in Kadokawa Shoten's Monthly Shōnen Ace magazine on December 26, 2016.

A spinoff manga series by Taku Kawamura, titled Soreyuke! Isekai Chīto Majishan (それゆけ！異世界チート魔術師), was serialized in Monthly Shōnen Ace from August 25, 2018, to October 26, 2019.

==== Volumes ====
===== Isekai Cheat Magician =====
No.	Release date	ISBN
1	June 26, 2017	978-4-04-105917-3
2	October 26, 2017	978-4-04-106309-5
3	April 26, 2018	978-4-04-106310-1
4	September 25, 2018	978-4-04-107474-9
5	March 26, 2019	978-4-04-107477-0
6	June 25, 2019	978-4-04-108356-7
7	October 26, 2019	978-4-04-108357-4
8	April 25, 2020	978-4-04-109338-2
9	September 26, 2020	978-4-04-109340-5
10	February 26, 2021	978-4-04-109341-2
11	July 26, 2021	978-4-04-111584-8
12	February 25, 2022	978-4-04-111586-2
13	July 26, 2022	978-4-04-112723-0
14	January 26, 2023	978-4-04-113364-4
15	June 26, 2023	978-4-04-113825-0
16	December 26, 2023	978-4-04-114437-4
17	June 25, 2024	978-4-04-115051-1
18	December 26, 2024	978-4-04-115712-1
19	August 26, 2025	978-4-04-116543-0
20	February 25, 2026	978-4-04-117164-6
21	September 25, 2026	978-4-04-117753-2

===== Soreyuke! Isekai Chīto Majishan =====
No.	Release date	ISBN
1	March 26, 2019	978-4-04-107821-1
2	June 25, 2019	978-4-04-108355-0

=== Anime ===
An anime adaptation was announced on April 16, 2018. The series was animated by Encourage Films and directed by Daisuke Tsukushi, with Takayo Ikami handling series composition, and Shuji Maruyama designing the characters. Yoshiaki Fujisawa composed the series' music. The series aired from July 10 to September 25, 2019, on AT-X, Tokyo MX, KBS, SUN, TVA, and BS11. MYTH & ROID performed the opening theme song "PANTA RHEI", while Rie Takahashi performed the ending theme song "Chīsana Omoi" (小さな想い). The series ran for 12 episodes. An OVA episode premiered on July 5, 2021. Crunchyroll has licensed the series with a dub.

No.	Title (Note: All English titles are taken from Crunchyroll.)	Original release date
1	"Lost Ones from Another World"; Transliteration: "Isekai kara no "Mayoijin"" (Japanese: 異世界からの「迷い人」)	July 10, 2019
In another world, a magical summoning is attempted, but an assassin attacks, corrupting the spell. On Earth, two Japanese students named Taichi and Rin are suddenly caught in a magic circle and transported into the other world. A monster horse attacks them, but a trio of magic-wielding adventurers come to their aid and kill it. Inspired by them to become adventurers to make a living, Taichi and Rin are escorted to the city of Azpire, where they attempt to register with the Adventurers Guild. However, when a measure of their magical ability is taken, the readings prove so startling that the guildmaster sends Taichi and Rin to Lemia, a master magician, and her Elf apprentice Muller. After taking her own reading of Taichi and Rin's magical capabilities, Lemia declares that they must become her apprentices.
2	"Magic Training"; Transliteration: "Majutsu Shugyō" (Japanese: 魔術修行)	July 17, 2019
Lemia discloses that Rin and especially Taichi possess tremendous magical powers, making an apprenticeship with her a prerequisite in order to control them. While Rin is identified as a Quad Magician capable of wielding all four of the principal magical elements, Taichi is designated an even rarer Unique Magician who can directly employ the power of the spirits who control those elemental forces, although his magical specialty remains unknown for now. Under Lemia and Muller's tutelage, the two graduate in a surprisingly short time and are then sent back to Azpire to become registered adventurers. But all the while, Taichi keeps hearing a fleeting voice speaking to him every now and then.
3	"Beginner Adventurers"; Transliteration: "Kakedashi Bōkensha" (Japanese: 駆け出し冒険者)	July 24, 2019
After working as low-rank adventurers for a time, Taichi and Rin are entrusted with a mission to discover the cause of Azpire's rising shortage of food and other vital necessities. In the bar they are assigned to investigate, it just turns out that the patrons merely skimmed their food from a caravan which was already raided; but on their way back, Taichi and Rin are attacked by a trio of female assassins. Overpowering one and driving the others into flight, they take their captive to the guild, where she is made an offer for her freedom. The next day, Muller takes them to the countryside to check on a delay of fruit deliveries related to the economic shortage. They end up fighting several monsters, but they quickly begin to suspect Cassim, one of the fruit farmers they met, to be in league with the actual thieves.
4	"Crimson Pact"; Transliteration: "Shinku no Keiyaku" (Japanese: 真紅の契約)	July 31, 2019
Taichi, Rin and Muller find and overpower a gang of thugs raiding the orchards, and then confront Cassim with their suspicions. Cornered, Cassim admits that he orchestrated the raids, and he and his partner Grammy attack the three. To defeat Taichi, Cassim summons a frost elemental and augments it with his Crimson Pact magic, making it virtually unbeatable. But when he threatens to harm Rin and Muller, a wind spirit called Aerial, whose voice has been addressing him all the time, offers to lend Taichi her power, which he accepts. His abilities vastly boosted by Aerial, Taichi destroys the elemental and severs Cassim's arm as he and Grammy make their escape; but the power he expends takes a toll on him, and he collapses into unconsciousness. In a post-credit scene, a young woman begins torturing someone for information, while a pair of young twin magicians feed a huge number of pods in a subterranean chamber with magical power.
5	"A Hint of Schemes"; Transliteration: "Sakudō no Nioi" (Japanese: 策動の匂い)	August 7, 2019
Taichi finds himself back in Lemia's hut, where Rin and Muller took him after his collapse. After learning of his battle with the Crimson Magicians, Lemia identifies Taichi's specialty as a Summoner who can bond with elemental spirits and directly employ their vast powers. Returning to Azpire to rejoin Rin and Muller, Taichi encounters Anastasia, the assassin he and Rin captured, now a guild member investigating the cause of the food shortage. Teaming up, they infiltrate a manor in the city which is suspected to be the center of this operation, only to discover a scheme to unleash an army of Crimson Pact-enhanced monsters on Azpire. In the meantime, Rin and Muller are lured into a trap by Cassim, Grammy and another mysterious man who introduces him as the mastermind of the impeding invasion and challenges them to defy him.
6	"Defense of Azpire"; Transliteration: "Asupaia Bōei-sen" (Japanese: アズパイア防衛戦)	August 14, 2019
Rin and Muller return to the guildhouse and spread the alarm about the incoming incursion. Taichi and Anastasia battle their way into the mansion's cellar, where the twin Magicians Miro and Mero sic the Crimson-enhanced goblins they've been breeding at them. However, they quickly lose control over their charges, prompting Taichi to rescue them. As dawn arrives, Azpire's adventurers meet the monster invaders, many of them Crimson-enhanced, in battle. Returning from the mansion exploration, Taichi leaves Anastasia behind to join the fighting.
7	"Summoner"; Transliteration: "Shōkanjutsushi" (Japanese: 召喚術師)	August 21, 2019
As the battle rages, and the mystery man and Cassim observe it, Anastasia is put under a hypnotic charm and strays into the battlegrounds. To everyone's surprise, the fighting is joined by a two-headed dragon rising from the underground. As Taichi prepares to engage the monster, Anastasia appears beside him and is mortally wounded by the dragon's breath attack. As she dies in his arms, the enraged Taichi asks Aerial for more power, a wish which formally seals the pact between him as a Summoner and Aerial as his bonded spirit and also enhances Taichi's resolve to save all those he cares for. Facing the dragon, Taichi beats it to the ground, whereupon the dragon withdraws, but not without providing him with a cryptic warning that a certain person wishes to (and will) use Taichi's power to control the fate of this world.
8	"Royal Capital Wennifix"; Transliteration: "Ōto Wenēfikusu" (Japanese: 王都ウェネーフィクス)	August 28, 2019
Following the battle, Taichi, Rin, Lemia and Muller receive a summons to Wennifix, the capital of Eristein (the realm where Azpire is located), to aid King Gilmar in quelling the rebellion instigated by his younger brother, Duke Dortesheim. Upon meeting the king, Lemia confronts him with the suspicion that he is responsible for Taichi and Rin's displacement into this world, which Gilmar confirms. His daughter, Princess Charlotte, performed the summoning upon her father's command, but is to her utmost regret unable to return Taichi and Rin back to Earth. As Taichi and Rin must face the prospect of having to fight - and possibly kill - human beings, the mystery man from Azpire is revealed to be Lodra, the king's high cardinal.
9	"Commencement of Battle"; Transliteration: "Ikusa no Hajimari" (Japanese: 戦のはじまり)	September 4, 2019
Upon learning of the arrival of Taichi and Rin, whose prowess in Azpire has made them near-legendary, Duke Dortesheim decides to accelerate his plan to seize the throne. An assassin is sent to eliminate them, but Taichi and his friends notice his presence and prepare an ambush, foiling the attempt on their lives. The next day, Marquis Nilgan, one of Dortesheim's allies, leads the first attack with a surprisingly small force; but their plan is unveiled when they employ powerful magic rings to bombard the royal defenders with far-range attacks. Combining their powers, Taichi, Rin, Aerial and the court magicians take out the attackers with a lightning strike which leaves them all paralyzed, sparing their lives; Nilgan is assassinated by Inimicus, Dortesheim's advisor, for his failure. In a post-credit scene, Cassim and Grammy, who have infiltrated the capital, plan to lure Taichi into a trap to settle the score between him and Cassim.
10	"Turning Point"; Transliteration: "Hitotsu no Ketchaku" (Japanese: ひとつの決着)	September 11, 2019
While looking for a stomach cure after overeating at the victory feast, Taichi is met by Cassim, who coerces him into a duel. To even the odds and determine which one of them is more skilled, Cassim uses a magical effigy given to him by Lodra to block the bulk of Taichi's powers. Remembering Lemia's training, Taichi defeats his opponent, but to everyone's shock a dark spirit emerges from the effigy to kill Taichi. Working together, Taichi, Cassim and Grammy destroy the effigy, restoring Taichi's power and allowing him to banish the spirit. Taichi parts with Cassim and Grammy, who have gained a grudging respect for him, but this clash was all according to the plan of Lodra and his mysterious mistress, Lady Shade. Dortesheim declares open war, and hasty preparations are made to meet the enemy.
11	"Battle of Marwalt"; Transliteration: "Māworuto no Kaisen" (Japanese: マーウォルトの会戦)	September 18, 2019
The war for the crown begins, and the two armies clash on the battlefield. While Rin, Lemia and Muller fight alongside the king's soldiers, Taichi and Aerial infiltrate Dortesheim's base camp to try and convince him to end the rebellion peacefully. But Inimicus, imbued with dark magic and drunk with devotion to Lady Shade, unleashes a spell which turns the soldiers of both sides into zombie-like berserkers who threaten to slaughter everyone in their path.
12	"Isekai Cheat Magician"; Transliteration: "Isekai Chīto Majutsushi" (Japanese: 異世界チート魔術師)	September 25, 2019
The two opposing armies join forces to stand against the berserkers, but face impossible odds. Ready to do whatever he must to save his friends, Taichi calls on Aerial's full power. Acknowledging Taichi's willingness to sacrifice himself, Aerial gives up her current form, evolving into the Queen of the Wind Spirits, Sylphid, and enabling Taichi to break the spell. He then combats Inimicus, who is transformed into a demon by the dark power in him, and destroys him; but before that, Inimicus informs him of Lady Shade's intentions to use his powers to change this world. With the civil war ended, Dortesheim is executed for treason, while Taichi's group is amply rewarded for their service and return to Azpire as heroes. Despite Inimicus' foreshadowing of future conflict, Taichi strengthens his resolve to use his powers to protect his beloved friends.
13 (OVA)	"Starry Night Festival"; Transliteration: "Yoiboshi no Matsuri to Majutsushi" (Japanese: 宵星の祭りと魔術師)	July 5, 2021
The gang arrives back in Azpire to see that a festival is being set up for that night. The Starry Night Festival happens once a year and allows the dead to reunite with family, friends and loved ones as long as all people involved are wearing masquerade masks. The living leave masks at their people's graves so they will be able to identify them by the mask they are wearing. Taichi buys flowers and a mask, leaving them on Anastasia's headstone. Taichi's group then establishes a shaved ice stall after the Guild Masters' aphrodisiac soup does not meet their approval. As the credits start to roll, Taichi dances with Rin, before seeing Anastasia and dancing with her for the last song of the night.
