= Karin Suzuragi =

Japanese manga artist and illustrator

Karin Suzuragi (鈴羅木 かりん, Suzuragi Karin; born August 3 in Aichi Prefecture) is a Japanese manga artist and illustrator. She writes mainly for anthologies of video games published by Square Enix and Ohzora Publishing. Since 2005, she has serialized four manga based on the Higurashi When They Cry visual novel series, Onikakushi-hen, Tsumihoroboshi-hen, Matsuribayashi-hen, and Saikoroshi-hen, in Gangan Powered and Monthly Gangan Joker (both published by Square Enix). In 2007, she serialized a special comic based on Wild Arms XF from the November to March issue of Dengeki Maoh. In January 2008, she was in charge of illustrations for Seifuku Musume, published by Shueisha and Super Dash Bunko. In the same year, from the August issue of Monthly Shōnen Rival, she serialized Out Code: Chōjō Hanzai Tokumu Sōsakan.

== Works illustrated ==
- Busin 0 ~Wizardry Alternative Neo~ Yami ni Ikiru Majo no Shukufuku (2004)
- Higurashi When They Cry series
  - Onikakushi-hen (2005)
  - Tsumihoroboshi-hen (2006)
  - Matsuribayashi-hen (2008-2009)
  - Saikoroshi-hen (2011)
- Wild Arms XF (2007)
- Out Code: Chōjō Hanzai Tokumu Sōsakan (2008)
- Nanami Chiaki no Sayonara Zetsubō Daibōken (2012)
- Ao Oni (2014)
- Isekai Cheat Magician (2017)
- How I Became King by Eating Monsters (2024)
