= Putting a Price on World Peace =

Japanese light novel

- Light novel volume cover

追放された商人は金の力で世界を救う (Tsuihō Sareta Shōnin wa Kin no Chikara de Sekai o Sukū)
- Genre: Fantasy
- Novel series
- Written by: Daken
- Published by: Shōsetsuka ni Narō
- Published: March 19, 2023
- Light novel
- Written by: Daken
- Illustrated by: Bench Kanase
- Published by: Shufu to Seikatsu Sha
- English publisher: NA: J-Novel Club
- Imprint: PASH! Bunko
- Published: March 1, 2024
- Volumes: 1
- Manga
- Written by: Daken; Masahiro Itosugi (composition)
- Illustrated by: Sen Higashiyama
- Published by: Shufu to Seikatsu Sha
- Imprint: PASH! Comics
- Magazine: Comic PASH! Neo
- Original run: July 31, 2026 – present
- Volumes: 1
- Anime television series

Putting a Price on World Peace (追放された商人は金の力で世界を救う, Tsuihō Sareta Shōnin wa Kin no Chikara de Sekai o Sukū; lit. 'The Exiled Merchant Saves the World with the Power of Gold') is a Japanese light novel written by Daken and illustrated by Bench Kanase. It was published online in March 2023 on the user-generated novel publishing website Shōsetsuka ni Narō. It was later acquired by Shufu to Seikatsu Sha, who published a single volume in March 2024 under their PASH! Bunko imprint. A manga adaptation with art by Sen Higashiyama and composition by Masahiro Itosugi has been serialized online via Shufu to Seikatsu Sha's Comic PASH! Neo manga service since July 2026 and has been collected in a single tankōbon volume. An anime television series adaptation has been announced.

== Plot ==
Torao is a merchant attached to the S-rank adventurer party Blue Ring. After he is discovered secretly diverting funds to support Garnet, a rookie all-female adventurer party, he is expelled from Blue Ring. Before leaving, Torao warns his former companions not to recklessly challenge the Demon King, but they ignore him and are wiped out.

Following Blue Ring's destruction, Torao joins Garnet and begins working with them toward the goal of defeating the Demon King. Their first mission together is to recover valuable weapons and equipment from the corpses of Torao's former party members on the front lines.

== Characters ==
Torao (トラオ)
Rio (リオ)
Lilith (リリス, Ririsu)
Dominic (ドミニク, Dominiku)

== Media ==
=== Light novel ===
Written by Daken, Putting a Price on World Peace was published on Shōsetsuka ni Narō on March 19, 2023. It was later acquired by Shufu to Seikatsu Sha who published a single volume with illustrations by Bench Kanase under their PASH! Bunko imprint on March 1, 2024.

In November 2026, J-Novel Club announced it had licensed the light novel for English publication.

No.	Release date	ISBN
1	March 1, 2024	978-4-391-16183-0

=== Manga ===
A manga adaptation illustrated by Sen Higashiyama and with composition by Masahiro Itosugi began serialization on Shufu to Seikatsu Sha's Comic PASH! Neo manga website on July 31, 2026. The manga's chapters have been collected in a single tankōbon volume as of November 2026.

No.	Release date	ISBN
1	November 6, 2026	978-4-391-16912-6

=== Anime ===
An anime television series adaptation was also announced on July 31, 2026.

== See also ==
- How I Became King by Eating Monsters, another light novel series written by Daken
- The Suspects of Necromancy, another light novel written by Daken
- Who Killed the Hero?, another light novel series written by Daken
- The Wicked Princess and Her Twelve Eyes, another light novel series written by Daken
- Witch and Mercenary, another light novel series illustrated by Bench Kanase
