= Witch and Mercenary =

Japanese light novel series

- First light novel volume cover

魔女と傭兵 (Majo to Yōhei)
- Genre: Action; Fantasy
- Novel series
- Written by: Kaeru Chōhōkiteki
- Published by: Shōsetsuka ni Narō
- Original run: June 9, 2021 – present
- Light novel
- Written by: Kaeru Chōhōkiteki
- Illustrated by: Bench Kanase
- Published by: Micro Magazine
- English publisher: NA: Seven Seas Entertainment
- Imprint: GCN Bunko
- Original run: May 19, 2023 – present
- Volumes: 8 (Note: Nine volumes in total, including the second part of the sixth volume.)
- Manga
- Written by: Kaeru Chōhōkiteki
- Illustrated by: Makoto Miyagi
- Published by: Kodansha
- English publisher: NA: Seven Seas Entertainment
- Imprint: Shōnen Magazine Comics
- Magazine: Magazine Pocket
- Original run: January 28, 2024 – present
- Volumes: 9
- Anime television series
- Directed by: Shinpei Ezaki
- Written by: Taishirou Tanimura
- Music by: Rei Ishizuka
- Studio: Eight Bit
- Original network: NNS (Nippon TV), BS NTV
- Original run: April 2027 – scheduled
- icon

Witch and Mercenary (Japanese: 魔女と傭兵, Hepburn: Majo to Yōhei) is a Japanese light novel series written by Kaeru Chōhōkiteki and illustrated by Bench Kanase. It began serialization on the user-generated novel publishing website Shōsetsuka ni Narō in June 2021. It was later acquired by Micro Magazine, which began publishing it under their GCN Bunko imprint in May 2023. A manga adaptation illustrated by Makoto Miyagi began serialization on Kodansha's Magazine Pocket manga website in January 2024. An anime television series adaptation produced by Eight Bit is set to premiere in April 2027.

== Synopsis ==
On the Old Continent, witches are regarded as magic-wielding symbols of fear and hunted. Mercenary Zig Crane agrees to join one of these witch hunts. However, after fighting said witch, Saoirse, to a stalemate, they end up bonding upon realizing that they are the same: people forced to become killers by their environment. Agreeing that they have no future in this land, Saoirse hires Zig to escort her to the New Continent, where magic is common. Unfortunately, upon arriving, they learn that this peaceful country ostracizes mercenaries rather than witches, as it does not need them. Will Zig and Saoirse be able to adapt to this new home where their dynamics are reversed?

== Characters ==
Zig Crane (ジグ=クレイン, Jigu Kurein)
Voiced by: Taito Ban
Saoirse (シアーシャ, Siāsha)
Voiced by: Saori Hayami
Isana Gihon (イサナ=ゲイホーン, Isana Geihōn)
Voiced by: Yuri Noguchi
Alan Clows (アラン=クローズ, Aran Kurōzu)
Voiced by: Hiromu Mineta
Elicia Armel (エルシア=アーメット, Erushia Āmetto)
Voiced by: Haruka Shiraishi

== Media ==
=== Light novel ===
Written by Kaeru Chōhōkiteki, Witch and Mercenary began serialization on the user-generated novel publishing website Shōsetsuka ni Narō on June 9, 2021. It was later acquired by Micro Magazine who began publishing it with illustrations by Bench Kanase under their GCN Bunko light novel imprint on May 19, 2023. Eight volumes have been released as of September 2026. The series is licensed in English by Seven Seas Entertainment.

No.	Original release date	Original ISBN	North American release date	North American ISBN
1	May 19, 2023	978-4-86716-424-2	September 12, 2024 (digital); October 8, 2024 (print)	979-8-89160-302-8
1. Prologue; 2. Chapter 1: "Journey to the Unknown Continent"; 3. Chapter 2: "Adventurers"; 4. Chapter 3: "Princess of White Lightning"; 5. Chapter 4: "Monstrosity Swarm"; 6. Chapter 5: "Past and Present"; Bonus: "The Receptionist's Concerns"
2	September 20, 2023	978-4-86716-471-6	February 6, 2025 (digital); March 4, 2025 (print)	979-8-89160-897-9
1. Chapter 1: "A New Conflict"; 2. Chapter 2: "Outsiders and Change"; 3. Chapter 3: "Guilty Until Proven Innocent"; 4. Chapter 4: "Consequences of a Chosen Path"
3	March 19, 2024	978-4-86716-547-8	May 22, 2025 (digital); July 29, 2025 (print)	979-8-89373-185-9
1. Chapter 1: "A Familiar Conflict and Unfamiliar Days"; 2. Chapter 2: "Alien Elements, Strangers, and the Insolent"; 3. Chapter 3: "No Road Ahead"; 4. Chapter 4: "Traces of Weak Soldiers' Dreams"; Side story: "The Choice to Live"; Bonus: "Business Strategy and Techniques"
4	July 20, 2024	978-4-86716-608-6	August 28, 2025 (digital); October 28, 2025 (print)	979-8-89373-797-4
1. Chapter 1: "Return to Normalcy and a Looming Threat"; 2. Chapter 2: "Men, Tools, and Their Uses"; 3. Chapter 3: "Boulder-Breaking Silver Strike"; 4. Chapter 4: "Birds of a Feather"
5	November 20, 2024	978-4-86716-663-5	January 29, 2026 (digital); February 17, 2026 (print)	979-8-89561-231-6
1. Chapter 1: "Grinding Gears"; 2. Chapter 2: "Demonic Monkey Dogs"; 3. Chapter 3: "Claritist Doctrines"; 4. Chapter 4: "Remitter"; 5. Chapter 5: "Aftermath"; Side story: "Witch and Mercenaries"; Bonus: "Impatient Patient"
6.1	June 20, 2025	978-4-86716-776-2; 978-4-86716-777-9 (SE)	March 26, 2026 (digital); April 28, 2026 (print)	979-8-89765-402-4
1. Chapter 1: "Attack of the Killer Bees"; 2. Chapter 2: "A Creeping Presence"; 3. Chapter 3: "Fishing and Other Activities: Ways to Deepen a Friendship"; 4. Chapter 4: "A Cornered Rat Bites Back"
6.2	July 22, 2025	978-4-86716-793-9; 978-4-86716-794-6 (SE)	June 11, 2026 (digital); July 7, 2026 (print)	979-8-89765-672-1
1. Chapter 1: "The Golden Moon Hidden Behind a Purple Curtain"; 2. Chapter 2: "The Family That Is Thicker than Blood"; 3. Chapter 3: "The Great Spear Is Wrapped in Blood"; 4. Chapter 4: "Stellar Collision"; Side story: "Impossible Coexistence"
7	January 20, 2026	978-4-86716-901-8	October 8, 2026 (digital); December 8, 2026 (print)	979-8-89863-271-7
1. Chapter 1: "Twinblade's Origin"; 2. Chapter 2: "Sunlit Path, Blood-Soaked Shadows"; 3. Chapter 3: "Martyrdom's End"; 4. Chapter 4: "Training and Relaxation"; 5. Chapter 5: "A Blood-Drenched Encounter"
8	September 24, 2026	978-4-82500-038-4	June 1, 2027 (print)	979-8-90209-084-7

=== Manga ===
A manga adaptation illustrated by Makoto Miyagi began serialization on Kodansha's Magazine Pocket manga website on January 28, 2024. The manga's chapters have been compiled into nine tankōbon volumes as of August 2026. The manga's chapters are simultaneously published in English on Kodansha's K Manga app under the title The Witch and the Mercenary. During their panel at Anime NYC 2026, Seven Seas Entertainment announced that they had also licensed the manga adaptation for English publication.

No.	Original release date	Original ISBN	English release date	English ISBN
1	May 9, 2024	978-4-06-535542-8	April 13, 2027	979-8-90568-236-0
2	July 9, 2024	978-4-06-536134-4	June 15, 2027	979-8-90568-237-7
3	October 8, 2024	978-4-06-536765-0	—	—
4	January 8, 2025	978-4-06-537761-1	—	—
5	May 9, 2025	978-4-06-539453-3	—	—
6	August 7, 2025	978-4-06-540354-9	—	—
7	November 7, 2025	978-4-06-541547-4	—	—
8	March 9, 2026	978-4-06-542970-9	—	—
9	August 7, 2026	978-4-06-544623-2	—	—
10	December 9, 2026	978-4-06-546193-8	—	—

=== Anime ===
An anime television series adaptation was announced on April 15, 2026. The series will be produced by Eight Bit and directed by Shinpei Ezaki, with Taishirou Tanimura handling series composition, Keita Matsumoto designing the characters, and Rei Ishizuka composing the music. It is set to premiere in April 2027 on Nippon TV and its affiliates.

== Reception ==
The series was ranked fifth in the bunkobon category at the 2023 Next Light Novel Awards. The series was ranked second in the same category in the 2024 edition.

The manga adaptation was nominated for the 11th Next Manga Awards in the print category in 2025, and was ranked thirteenth and won the U-Next Award.

== See also ==
- Putting a Price on World Peace, another light novel illustrated by Bench Kanase
