= The Suspects of Necromancy =

Japanese light novel

- Light novel volume cover

死霊魔術の容疑者 (Shiryō Majutsu no Yōgisha)
- Genre: Dark fantasy; Romance; Suspense
- Novel series
- Written by: Daken
- Published by: Shōsetsuka ni Narō
- Published: May 10, 2023
- Light novel
- Written by: Daken
- Illustrated by: Shiho Enta
- Published by: Micro Magazine
- English publisher: NA: Seven Seas Entertainment
- Imprint: GC Novels
- Published: March 29, 2024
- Volumes: 1
- Manga
- Written by: Daken
- Illustrated by: Onio
- Published by: Ichijinsha
- Imprint: Rex Comics
- Magazine: Monthly Comic Rex
- Original run: June 27, 2024 – present
- Volumes: 4

The Suspects of Necromancy (死霊魔術の容疑者, Shiryō Majutsu no Yōgisha) is a Japanese light novel written by Daken and illustrated by Shiho Enta. It was published as a web novel on Shōsetsuka ni Narō in May 2023. It was later acquired by Micro Magazine who published it under its GC Novels imprint in March 2024. A manga adaptation illustrated by Onio began serialization in Ichijinsha's shōnen manga magazine Monthly Comic Rex in June 2024.

== Synopsis ==
In the Kingdom of Rahma, necromancy is a forbidden art that is making its return. As rebellions within the kingdom begin to mount due to the king's illness, an undead army rises to quell the rebellion. In order to stop the influence of necromancy, Conrad, a young knight, goes out of his way to find the culprit. While on his investigation, it leads him to a mysterious girl named Luna.

== Characters ==
Luna (ルナ, Runa)
Voiced by: Rie Takahashi (PV)

== Media ==
=== Light novel ===
Written by Daken, The Suspects of Necromancy was published originally published as a web novel on Shōsetsuka ni Narō on May 10, 2023. It was later acquired by Micro Magazine who published it with illustrations by Shiho Enta under its GC Novels light novel imprint on March 29, 2024.

During their panel at Anime Expo 2026, Seven Seas Entertainment announced that they had licensed the novel for English publication, with the volume set to release in April 2027.

No.	Original release date	Original ISBN	North American release date	North American ISBN
1	March 29, 2024	978-4-86716-557-7	April 27, 2027	979-8-90209-677-1

=== Manga ===
A manga adaptation illustrated by Onio began serialization in Ichijinsha's shōnen manga magazine Monthly Comic Rex on June 27, 2024. The manga's chapters have been compiled into four tankōbon volumes as of October 2026.

No.	Release date	ISBN
1	December 25, 2024	978-4-7580-8622-6
2	June 26, 2025	978-4-7580-8732-2
3	January 27, 2026	978-4-7580-8935-7
4	October 27, 2026	978-4-8251-0173-9

=== Other ===
A promotional video was uploaded to Micro Magazine's YouTube channel on the day of the release of the light novel. It featured voice acting from Rie Takahashi.

== See also ==
- How I Became King by Eating Monsters, another light novel series written by Daken
- Putting a Price on World Peace, another light novel written by Daken
- Who Killed the Hero?, another light novel series written by Daken
- The Wicked Princess and Her Twelve Eyes, another light novel series written by Daken
