= Toi8 =

Japanese illustrator and animator

toi8 (born October 8, 1976) is a Japanese artist. He is most known for working on various anime such as .hack//The Movie, Maoyuu Maou Yuusha, Fullmetal Alchemist: Brotherhood, and several video games where he has served as character designer, including Tokyo Mirage Sessions ♯FE and I am Setsuna. He is also the illustrator of the My Daughter Left the Nest and Returned an S-Rank Adventurer and Who Killed the Hero? light novel series.

== Biography ==
toi8, a native of Kumamoto Prefecture, was born on October 8, 1976. He graduated from Yoyogi Animation College. After spending two years in the anime industry, he left to become a freelance illustrator after being assigned to work on keyframes. He started working at bishojo magazine Colorful PureGirl for his first job as an illustrator. His name toi8 originates from his birthday.

toi8's debut work was as illustrator for the 2002 light novel Kūsō Tōkyō Hyakkei. toi8 also illustrated the light novels Usotsuki wa Imōto ni Shite oku, My Daughter Left the Nest and Returned an S-Rank Adventurer and Conqueror of the Dying Kingdom, as well as character designer for the latter's manga adaptation. He illustrated Who Killed the Hero?, the bunkobon runner-up in the 2025 edition of Kono Light Novel ga Sugoi!.

toi8 designed the main characters for the 2015 video game Tokyo Mirage Sessions ♯FE. He was also character designer for I am Setsuna (2016).

Several art books focusing on toi8's art have been published. Yonghow Vong of Halcyon Realms praised his art book The Recollection City as "a splendid collection of beautiful illustrations from Toi8, at a bargain price". In July 2025, Ichijinsha released Girls Artwork, an art book featuring both toi8's illustrations from his existing works and exclusive original content.

His wife Tomomi Ozaki is a character designer.

== Works ==
=== Light novels ===
All as illustrator.

- Kūsō Tōkyō Hyakkei (2002)
- Usotsuki wa Imōto ni Shite oku (by Mariko Shimizu)
- Maoyu (with Keinojou Mizutama)
- My Daughter Left the Nest and Returned an S-Rank Adventurer
- Conqueror of the Dying Kingdom
- Who Killed the Hero?
- No.6 by Asano Atsuko

=== Video games ===
- Tokyo Mirage Sessions ♯FE (2015, main character designer)
- I am Setsuna (2016, character designer)
- Ys X: Nordics (2023, character designer)

=== Manga ===
- Cover illustration (including character visual design) for A Canticle for Comiket doujinshi by Kasuga, winner of the Hayakawa SF Contest

=== Anime ===
- .hack//The Movie
- Maoyu
- Fullmetal Alchemist: Brotherhood

=== Other works ===
- Conqueror of the Dying Kingdom (2023; manga, as character designer)
