= Go! Go! Nippon! =

2011 visual novel

- Developer: Overdrive
- Publisher: MangaGamer
- Platform: Windows
- Release: September 30, 2011
- Genre: Visual novel

Go! Go! Nippon!: My First Trip to Japan is a 2011 visual novel game developed by Overdrive. The game features a male tourist excited to travel to Japan for the first time with the intention of visiting two male friends. On arriving, he finds out his friends Makoto and Akira are actually two women he is set to stay with for a week. During his visit, the two sisters act as tour guides of cities and sightseeing locations around Japan and offer details about their history. Depending on the choices made in the game, the player has the opportunity to fall in love with one of the girls.

The game was developed by Overdrive, who previously had created more Japanese adult-oriented games. One of the staff members at Overdrive created MangaGamer in 2008 to expand a worldwide audience for these types of games, and created Go! Go! Nippon! to feature elements of these types of games, such as interacting with cute girls while reading text and making choices. MangaGamer initially reported poor sales in 2011, with a representative of the company discussing the difficulties of releasing successful visual novels beyond their niche audience to Western markets. After submitting Go! Go! Nippon! to Steam's green-light program, the game was eventually accepted for release by Steam. It went on to sell over 30,000 copies by 2014. A MangaGamer representative said along with their release of Higurashi When They Cry (2002) in the early 2000s, it allowed the service to be more open to releasing visual novels. Go! Go! Nippon! was reviewed from RPGFan and Siliconera, who both found the game functioned better as a virtual guide to Japan than as a virtual novel.

== Gameplay ==
Go! Go! Nippon! gameplay. The game acts as a visual novel as well as a virtual tour of areas of Japan.

A review from Siliconera described Go! Go! Nippon! as a visual novel, with tourist guide aspects. Visual novels are generally narrative-focused games, where the player's actions impact the story's progression or world. The story and interactions in these games are commonly presented through a text box and often employ forms of interaction which include menu choices. These menu options often employ additional forms of interaction, including choices with set actions the player can perform or dialogue options that represent the player's character speech or thoughts. Visual novels have their stories progress when the player clicks, taps or presses a button to see the next part of the story. The dialogue displays in both Japanese and English text screens at the same time.

Academic Patrick Galbraith expanded on the tour guide aspects, stating that it allowed players a virtual tour around Japan. He also described it as a bishōjo game, which are games that feature many attractive anime-styled girls. The two girls in the game are sisters, Makoto and Akira, who accompany the player character in the game and act as tour guides. They explain the origin of a location's name and the cultural customs and histories of said areas. On completing the game, an extra option becomes available that provides plot synopsizes of areas and sightseeing locations.

== Plot ==
In the game, the player takes on the role of a white male japanophile, whose visit to Japan includes spending a week planning to meet two brothers, Makoto and Akira, who live there. These two brothers turn out to be two Japanese twin sisters. Makoto is the wiser older sister, while Akira features more tsundere tropes. The tourist is very excitable and gets caught up in the various cultural and social differences in Japan, such as the debit card-based public transport system and 24-hour Japanese convenience stores.

While exploring Japan with the two sisters, the tourist has the potential to fall in love with his guides. Depending on which districts in Tokyo the player guides the characters to go to in the first three days, routes became available that culminate in a kiss between the player and either Makoto or Akira.

Replaying the games allows players to see the main districts of Tokyo such as Akihabara, Shibuya, and Shinjuku in and a few other cities, such as Kyoto, Yokohama, and Kamakura.

== Development ==
Takeuchi Hiroshi, also known as Bamboo, began working in the video game industry in 2000 and was a creative force at Japanese developer Overdrive. Patrick Galbraith described Bamboo as being dedicated to expanding the Japanese adult computer game market overseas. In 2008, Bamboo founded MangaGamer, a website Galbraith described as having a goal of making bishōjo games and Japanese adult games accessible to players around the world.

Overdrive developed Go! Go! Nippon!: My First Trip to Japan, while the game was published by MangaGamer. The game features mechanics of Overdrive's other adult computer games, such as interacting with cute girls while reading text and making choices. Bamboo produced Go! Go! Nippon!. The game does not feature voice acting in an effort to keep production costs low. A number of the backgrounds in the game were reused from Overdrive's earlier visual novel Kirakira (2007).

== Release ==
Go! Go! Nippon! was released on September 30, 2011, for various Microsoft Windows-based personal computers. By October, the publisher MangaGamer said that the game was not selling that well, while they still had better hopes for it over an extended period.

In 2011, John Pickett of MangaGamer discussed the difficulties of making visual novels successful beyond their niche audience to Western markets. He said that finding content without anime-style artwork was "very difficult". He said that while there were "countless" visual novels released for the PlayStation Portable and PlayStation 3 in Japan, digital distribution services like the PlayStation Network and Valve's Steam service, as it was "extremely difficult" to release visual novels in the West as they were not considered games.

In 2012, Steam introduced its greenlight process, a new initiative where Steam users are allowed to vote for games they would like to see made available on the service. In 2014, Pickett said it took Go! Go! Nippon! a year to be accepted by Steam's greenlight process. Following the games release on Steam, the game saw what Pete Davidson of USGamer described as a "a sharp uptake in sales". Davidson said these initial sales of 10,000 copies in January 2014 were "nothing compared to the triple-A titles of the world -- but it's a big success for a visual novel" and signaled it as a sign for the small audience for visual novels on mainstream storefronts. Following the sales of Go! Go! Nippon! and Higurashi When They Cry from MangaGamer, Pickett said that Valve had become more open to releasing visual novels through their platform. By October 2014, Go! Go! Nippon! had sold over 30,000 copies.

== Reception ==
Reviews for Go! Go! Nippon!'s release commented on the characters, the narrative and how useful it was as a guide to Japan for tourists. A reviewer for Siliconera found the protagonist was too full of contradictions, being written as both obsessed with Japan while also being unfamiliar with their public transport or 24-hour convenience stores. The reviewer also found the romantic nature of the game lacked depth for the amount of gameplay spent with them, and kept hoping it would focus more on exploring Japan. Andrew Barker of RPGFan found the story to be simple with cliché dialogue with enough cute moments peppered in, along with ones he described as "a little cringe-worthy." The Siliconera reviewer said the game was short and offered little in replay value.

Both reviewers found the game useful as a virtual guide of Japan, detailing the history of areas to day-to-day life items such as Suica cards as enjoyable. Barker complimented that the in-game text was featured in both Japanese and English, which was perfect for players trying to learn Japanese. The reviewer from Siliconera summarized that audiences looking for a guide would likely be put off by the romance plot of the game, while audiences for visual novels with depth in the character would find it lacking.

== See also ==
- 2011 in video games
- Tourism in Japan
