= Yukimasa =

- Pronunciation: jɯkʲimasa (IPA)
- Gender: Male

Origin
- Origin: Japanese
- Meaning: Different meanings depending on the kanji used

Yukimasa is a masculine Japanese given name.

== Written forms ==
Yukimasa can be written using different combinations of kanji characters. Here are some examples:

- 幸正, "happiness, righteous"
- 幸昌, "happiness, bright"
- 幸政, "happiness, political"
- 幸真, "happiness, true"
- 行正, "to go, righteous"
- 行昌, "to go, bright"
- 行政, "to go, political"
- 之正, "of, righteous"
- 之政, "of, political"
- 志正, "determination, righteous"
- 志昌, "determination, bright"
- 志真, "determination, true"
- 恭正, "respectful, righteous"
- 雪昌, "snow, bright"
- 雪真, "snow, true"

The name can also be written in hiragana ゆきまさ or katakana ユキマサ.

== Notable people with the name ==
- Yukimasa Kishino (岸野 幸正; born 1955), Japanese voice actor
- Yukimasa Nakamura (中村 行成; born 1972), Japanese judoka
- Yukimasa Sanada (真田 幸政, ????–1653), Japanese hatamoto

== Fictional characters ==
- Yukimasa Aida, a character in the visual novel The House in Fata Morgana
