= Euphoria (visual novel) =

2011 video game

- euphoria

ユーフォリア (Yūforia)
- Genre: Adult, Visual novel, Erotic thriller
- Video game
- Developer: CLOCKUP
- Publisher: CLOCKUP
- Genre: Visual novel
- Platform: Windows
- Released: JP: June 24, 2011
- Anime

euphoria
- Studio: Majin Label
- Released: December 23, 2011 – February 26, 2016

euphoria (ユーフォリア) is a Japanese adult visual novel developed by CLOCKUP on Windows and released on June 24, 2011, and released the HD edition on April 25, 2014. The game centers on a protagonist and six heroines trapped in a room, where they must follow extreme instructions for a deadly game issued by a mysterious voice in order to escape.

The scenario was written by Asou Ei (浅生詠), a writer known for dark, psychologically heavy stories, who later went on to work on titles like Natsu no Kusari and Lilja and Natsuka Painting Lies.

== Characters ==
Keisuke Takatō (高遠 恵輔, Takatō Keisuke)
Voiced by: Makoto Niizawa (OVA), Neko Kuroi (young, OVA)

The main character is a second-year student at Rokkeikan Academy.

Nemu Manaka (真中 合歓, Manaka Nemu)
Voiced by: Ringo Aoba

A second-year student at Rokkeikan Academy. She spends most of her time alone at school and has little interaction with her classmates. When the game begins, she toys with Keisuke as if to stimulate his desires.

Kanae Hokari (帆刈 叶, Hokari Kanae)
Voiced by: Himari

She is a second-year student at Rokkeikan Academy and Keisuke's childhood friend and classmate. In contrast to her youthful appearance, she has large breasts. She has a kind personality and was concerned about her friends even when they were held captive.

Rinne Byakuya (白夜 凛音, Byakuya Rinne)
Voiced by: Matsuri Sugihara

A second-year student at Rokkeikan Academy and a meticulous member of the disciplinary committee. Although she is often perceived as someone who prefers to act alone, she actively participates in volunteer activities.

Rika Makiba (蒔羽 梨香, Makiba Rika)
Voiced by: Konoha

A first-year student at Rokkeikan Academy, and Keisuke's junior.

Natsuki Aoi (葵 菜月, Aoi Natsuki)
Voiced by: Mei Misonoo

She is an English teacher at Rokkeikan Academy, teaching third-year students. She is popular with students due to her kind personality and beauty. On the other hand, other teachers criticize her for lacking authority, but she doesn't seem to mind, given her optimistic nature.

=== Sub-heroines ===
Miyako Andō (安藤 都子, Andō Miyako)
Voiced by: Karin Azuma

She is a second-year student at Rokkeikan Academy and the class representative of Keisuke's class. Due to her serious nature, she rebelled against the "mysterious voice" and refused to participate in the game at the beginning, so she was removed from the game by being executed in the electric chair.

== Storyline ==
Protagonist Keisuke Takatō awakens trapped in a white room, wearing a collar. After choosing whether to proceed through a door under time pressure, he is reunited with six girls he knows, where a computerized voice announces a forced "game."

The mysterious voice then reveals the rules of a deadly game in which Keisuke acts as the "unlocker" and the selected girl becomes the "keyhole", forcing them to clear assigned tasks. These tasks are extreme acts of humiliation, with failure resulting in death.

When one participant refuses to comply, she is murdered as a warning. The voice states that withdrawal or failure results in death, and survival requires choosing one of the girls and violating her. While the white-room death game forms the early portion of the narrative, it later expands significantly after escape, with character-specific routes that foreshadow and converge into a true ending.

== Gameplay ==
The game has an estimated playtime of about 31 hours and uses a route-based structure with individual heroine scenarios, leading to a true ending unlocked after completing specific routes. It includes 61 events and 82 CGs (not counting variations).

The content features sexual humiliation, coprophagia, erotic asphyxiation, branding with hot irons, and live dissection. Some visual elements (such as ahegao, feces, and other grotesque depictions) can be turned off in the settings.

Additional features include route completion bonuses, a gallery for replaying unlocked scenes, and staff commentaries (including voice actor remarks).

== Development ==
According to staff interviews published by CLOCKUP, euphoria was developed under a tightly coordinated but improvisational production structure, with core staff members handling multiple overlapping roles.

Event CG coloring was primarily handled by Aoi Hikami, who also contributed to the game's "emergency escape" screens. Hikami found the rare non-erotic, background-heavy CGs enjoyable, while describing the grotesque and degrading event illustrations (particularly those involving explicit bodily harm) as the most physically and mentally demanding work of their career.

PONSUKE, responsible for overall graphic asset management and interface elements, attributed production difficulties to late-stage CG approvals and disruptions from the 2011 Tōhoku earthquake. He also contributed to the game's emergency avoidance screens, using wordplay and off-color humor, and noted that long-term work in adult games had shifted his sense of what constitutes "normal" and "abnormal" content.

Game direction and scripting were led by Ryou Akutsu, who managed overall production, asset commissioning, voice recording coordination, and scripting - particularly for erotic scenes. Akutsu described the commissioning process as both the most rewarding and most challenging part of development due to the difficulty of conveying abstract creative intent.

Scenario planning and writing were handled by Asou Ei, who oversaw the full narrative, characters, settings, scenario text, bonus content, and outsourced writers. Asou stated that euphoria for a level of extremity in erotic writing that would normally be self-censored, while noting that emotionally intimate scenes were harder to write than explicit or grotesque ones.

Character artwork and parts of the UI design were created by Shigeo Hamashima, who described the project as a return to overtly violent and humiliating erotic illustration. In a later interview discussing the production of euphoria, Hamashima addressed audience surprise (particularly outside Japan) at learning that the artwork was created by a woman. Hamashima stated that she was involved with euphoria from the planning stages and found the project creatively rewarding, noting that many of the scenes she wanted to draw were included in the final game. At a Q&A panel at Anime Expo 2016, euphoria was cited among Hamashima's most notable works, alongside other CLOCKUP titles.

== Releases ==
euphoria was originally released for Windows on June 24, 2011. The original physical package edition was priced at JP¥9,240 at launch. A later budget release of the game was also issued.

An HD remastered version was released by CLOCKUP on April 25, 2014. The release updates the game's visuals while retaining its original scenario and structure.

In August 2014, publisher MangaGamer announced plans to release an English localization of the HD remastered version of euphoria during its Otakon panel. The release was confirmed to be fully uncensored.

The localization was released for Windows on November 27, 2015 at a price of US$44.95 and carried an 18+ rating. The English version retained the original Japanese voice acting while providing fully translated English text and interface elements.

In a 2015 interview with Gameverse, John Pickett of MangaGamer said that the company deliberately avoids pitching titles like euphoria to platforms such as Steam, contrasting it with more restrained visual novels. He further expressed hope that audiences would "see past its shock value" to appreciate the depth of its story.

== Reception ==
Sales charts and later reporting characterized euphoria as commercially successful despite its notoriety. In July 2011, Getchu ranked the game 19th in its monthly digital sales chart and highlighted both its popularity and its unusually elaborate story for a nukige. Men's Cyzo reported in 2021 that the title commanded high prices on the secondhand market and ultimately became one of CLOCKUP's most popular works, attributing its staying power to the strength of its uncompromising scenario.

Multiple publications emphasized the contrast between the game's graphic material and the scope of its scenario. MediaClip wrote that the title was often assumed to be a straightforward nukige because of the developer's reputation, but instead featured a tightly structured and expanding narrative reminiscent in its early stages of films such as Cube or Saw before broadening into something more ambitious. A September 2011 feature in BugBug likewise framed the work as a suspense-driven death game infused with psychological horror.

Chinese magazine Absolute Field framed the same tension as central to the game's appeal, describing it as an extreme work with a reputation as a "dark rape game" that nonetheless concealed a "pure love" story beneath its violent exterior, selecting it as a strong contender for best-written scenario of the first half of 2011. A 2021 article from 4Gamers echoed this interpretation, grouping euphoria alongside titles such as Saya no Uta as an example of extreme presentation being used to convey sincere emotional themes rather than shock alone.

Several reviewers highlighted the game's later revelations as a key factor in reshaping players' impressions. MediaClip praised the true ending for resolving earlier foreshadowing after what it described as divisive early material. Absolute Field likewise reported that many players experienced emotional catharsis once the narrative's themes of love became clear, though it simultaneously warned that the experience could be mentally taxing for unprepared audiences. Capsule Computers and Nukige Moa also emphasized that the game's strongest narrative impact emerged in its final routes, portraying the story as unusually ambitious for the genre despite its convoluted structure. BugBug devoted extended attention to the protagonist's internal conflict, describing routes in which he oscillates between guilt and escalating sadism, and singled out the tension as one of the scenario's strongest elements.

Critics consistently stressed that the game's extremity sharply limited its audience. MediaClip, Nukige Moa and Men's Cyzo all cautioned that the title's torture imagery and fetish content made it unsuitable for players without high tolerance for graphic or sadistic themes, even while acknowledging its narrative ambitions. Men's Cyzo characterized the work as occupying an unusual position between an utsuge ("depressing game") and a ryojokuge ("rape game"), while Nukige Moa framed its intensity as both its defining feature and its primary barrier to entry.

English-language coverage often emphasized the same contrast between notoriety and storytelling. The Anime Encyclopedia described euphoria as a pornographic game whose premise resembled Gantz and whose scenario framing echoed the Saw film series, while J-List called the game deeply disturbing but ultimately compelling, recommending it to readers interested in mysteries and survival stories while reiterating that its fetish content would alienate many players.

By the late 2010s, the game had also gained visibility at Western conventions through MangaGamer's distribution. YouTuber Sydney Poniewaz reported encountering the English release at Anime Expo 2018 and noted that it already carried a strong reputation within niche circles, despite limited mainstream attention at the time.

== Cultural impact ==
On the related internet radio program Hoshi Raji, a scene involving the death of the euphoria character Miyako Ando (voiced by Karin Azuma, who was also a program personality on the show) inspired a recurring on-air punishment segment in which a low-frequency electrotherapy device was used for an electric shock-based "penalty game" during the broadcast. The segment was well received by listeners and has since continued as a recurring feature.

== Music ==
The opening theme of euphoria, “Rakuen no Tobira" (楽園の扉, "Gate to Paradise"), was featured at the PC game music festival P.C.M. Live!02, held on March 18, 2012 in Ginza, where it was performed live by Ringo Aoba.

A single based on the theme music of euphoria, "Pandora no Rakuen / Rakuen no Tobira", performed by Aoba, was released on April 6, 2012. The release features "Pandora no Rakuen," used as the ending theme for the euphoria OVA, and "Rakuen no Tobira," the opening theme for the PC game, plus an instrumental bonus track. The single was distributed by Rock'n Banana.

The theme song Rakuen no Tobira was highlighted by Otapol as a standout element of euphoria. In November 2015, Aoba performed Rakuen no Tobira live at Holiday Shinjuku in Tokyo. The song was performed as the opening number of the encore, accompanied by live instrumentation before a sold-out audience.

== Merchandise ==
In February 2017, manufacturer Q-six released a 1/6-scale garage kit of Nemu Manaka (one of the six female protagonists of euphoria), at Wonder Festival 2017 Winter, ahead of the figure's planned release as a PVC finished product. The completed 1/6-scale PVC figure, based on an original illustration by character designer Shigeo Hamashima, was subsequently released in December 2017.

In December 2022, euphoria was included in the BugBug 30th anniversary issue as part of a commemorative trading bromide bonus campaign. The issue included a newly illustrated bromide representing euphoria.

== OVA ==
In 2011, euphoria was adapted into an adult original video anime based on the original visual novel. The OVA series was produced by Studio Majin and consists of six episodes, each with a runtime of approximately 29 minutes. It was released from December 2011 to February 2016.

The January 2012 issue of BugBug introduced the OVA as a direct visual adaptation of the early phase of the game's scenario, emphasizing its closed-room setting and the forced participation of the protagonist and six heroines in the mysterious "game". The OVA opens with the protagonist selecting his childhood friend, Kano, as the first participant, depicting their actions as humiliating and psychologically corrosive.

According to Otapol, a Japanese otaku-culture news site operated by Cyzo, the OVA presents a tone distinct from standard eroguro works, instead leaning toward a more overtly grotesque and nihilistic atmosphere.

Otapol further characterizes the OVA series as unusually high in production quality for the genre, citing smooth animation and explicit visual detail, while emphasizing that its extreme content makes it highly polarizing and suited only to a limited audience.
