= Natsu no Kusari =

2016 visual novel

夏ノ鎖 (Natsu no Kusari)
- Genre: Adult, Visual novel
- Video game
- Developer: CLOCKUP
- Publisher: CLOCKUP
- Genre: Visual novel
- Platform: Windows
- Released: JP: April 28, 2016

Natsu no Kusari (夏ノ鎖; lit. 'Summer Chains') is a 2016 Japanese adult visual novel developed by CLOCKUP. The work is positioned as a focused exploration of confinement and psychological domination, emphasizing sustained tension rather than conventional romance.

Character art was provided by Norizane, while the scenario was written by Asou Ei.

== Plotline ==
At the beginning of summer vacation, Okuno Shinji, a first-year student weighed down by an undefined sense of frustration, begins living alone after his grandfather falls ill.

Viewing his everyday life as gray and suffocating, he uses this opportunity to formulate a plan centered on confinement. His chosen target is Shirai Mitsuki, a girl from the same school with whom he has no prior relationship, identified only by her long black hair and reserved demeanor.

Mitsuki is described as a girl with a mature demeanor, raised in a comparatively affluent household, who now studies at a private music academy while aspiring to become a violinist. The encounter that initiates the confinement is presented as the result of a minor coincidence and misunderstanding, causing two lives that would not normally intersect to become fatally entangled.

The story frames the protagonist's actions as an attempt to break free from what he perceives as a colorless, stagnant everyday life. Rather than presenting a conventional love story, Natsu no Kusari focuses on the evolving psychological relationship between the one who confines and the one who is confined, closely examining their mental states and shifting power dynamics over time.

The scenario includes graphic depictions of injury, as well as shifts in attitude and mental instability on both sides. The plot explicitly allows for death outcomes, and repeatedly presents confinement as an escalating situation with irreversible consequences rather than a temporary or stylized scenario.

== Gameplay ==
Natsu no Kusari is structured as a narrative-driven visual novel with an emphasis on an enclosed setting. Player progression centers on making choices that influence how the confinement scenario develops. The game places particular weight on mood and visual cohesion, using detailed summer imagery to ground its otherwise oppressive atmosphere. The narrative is structured around a single heroine, Shirai Mitsuki.

The title contains 41 base CGs, expanded to 481 images including variations. Full voice acting is included, while animated scenes are absent.

As a CLOCKUP title, it includes extensive content configuration options intended to accommodate player preferences, including toggles for certain extreme elements. The experience is designed to be direct and focused, prioritizing thematic consistency and psychological impact over branching routes or large casts.

== Development ==
During a production interview, director Akutsu Ryou described Natsu no Kusari as a work shaped by themes of nostalgia and youth that nonetheless adhered to the studio's signature approach. Akutsu explained that while the preview visuals conveyed a clean, summery tone, the actual content remained uncompromising, explicitly defining the game as a rape-focused nukige rather than a conventional romance-driven title.

In an interview with Real Sound, writer Asou Ei described Natsu no Kusari as a work centered on miscommunication as its primary theme, while also depicting romantic relationships. He noted that his works are often characterized as "black but pure love," and cited Natsu no Kusari as an example in which fractured communication between characters forms the core of the narrative, with romance woven into that framework rather than serving as the sole focus.

In a 2025 GAME Watch interview, Asou stated that Natsu no Kusari was written after Euphoria with the explicit intention of moving away from an overreliance on narrative gimmicks and structural twists, instead placing greater emphasis on interpersonal communication and the emotional nuances of characters. Asou noted that Natsu no Kusari was well received, reinforcing his desire to pursue storytelling that balances a clearly defined narrative line with an emphasis on human drama.

Voice actress Aoi Tokio, speaking in a 2024 BugBug magazine interview, described Natsu no Kusari as a particularly memorable project, noting that it continues to generate fan discussion on social media each summer, which she viewed as evidence of its lasting appeal.

Tokio voiced the female protagonist Shirai Mitsuki, portraying her as a character defined by inner strength and quiet composure. She stated that she avoided stereotypical schoolgirl mannerisms during the audition and instead focused on those traits, and added that her background as a music college graduate helped inform the role, as Mitsuki is a violinist.

== Release ==
Natsu no Kusari was released as a physical DVD-ROM title on April 28, 2016, with a standard price of 4,752 yen, equivalent to $44 in 2016 US dollars. The game is designated 18+ only.

== Reception ==
In April 2016, Natsu no Kusari ranked 19th on the Getchu monthly PC game sales chart following its release.

DenFamiNicoGamer grouped Natsu no Kusari with Euphoria as a work noted for delivering a story that "deeply pierces the player's heart". The article highlights the title's emotionally intense narrative as a defining characteristic of the game, reinforcing its reputation for leaving a lasting psychological impact on players while explicitly crediting scenario writer Asou Ei for this quality.

In coverage by Men's Cyzo, an adult-oriented culture and media outlet operated by the Japanese publisher Cyzo, Natsu no Kusari was noted for its focus on the darker aspects of human psychology, combining an exploration of inner emotional conflict with the CLOCKUP brand's reputation for uncompromisingly hardcore erotic depiction.
