= A Kiss for the Petals =

Japanese visual novel, launched 2006

- Maidens of Michael Cover
- Genre: Visual novel
- Developer: Fuguriya
- Publishers: MangaGamer; St. Michael Girls' School; Yurin Yurin
- Creators: JUN; Peko; Shinichirō Sano
- Platforms: Microsoft Windows, Linux, Mac OS, Android, iOS, Nintendo DS, PlayStation Portable
- First release: A Kiss for the Petals; November 25, 2006
- Latest release: The New Generation; November 25, 2016

A Kiss for the Petals (その花びらにくちづけを, Sono Hanabira ni Kuchizuke o) is a Japanese adult yuri visual novel series created by the Dōjin group Fuguriya. The series debuted on November 25, 2006, with a visual novel of the same name for Microsoft Windows. A total of 23 titles have been released following its debut as of October 26, 2016. Following the success of the first game, it has been expanded into a series of visual novels, light novels, drama CDs, radio shows, art books and an anime adaptation.

== Plot ==
Set in St. Michael's Academy (Mikajyo), the game follows the relationships and romances between various girls. While a majority of the games focus on a single couple, some of the newer titles feature multiple couples.

== Characters ==
=== Main series ===
Nanami Oda (織田 七海, Oda Nanami)
Voiced by: Fuyuka Toiro (First Game), Yumi Haruna (Second Game), Nana Yasaka (Third Game), Konoko Takanashi (Fourth Game)
Nanami is a first-year high school student at St. Michael's Academy who has romantic feelings for her fellow student Yūna.

Yūna Matsubara (松原 優菜, Matsubara Yūna)
Voiced by: Pochi Uchino
Yūna is a second-year high school student at St. Michael's, and chairman of the Environmental Protection Committee (a group that is functionally the student council). She is the daughter of wealthy parents who are the directors of large hospitals all over Japan. Yūna has a gentle disposition, with a natural gift for sports. She is a campus idol, naturally adored by her juniors and seniors alike, although she pretends to be oblivious to this.

Reo Kawamura (川村 玲緒, Kawamura Reo)
Voiced by: Hana Anzu
Reo is a second-year student and classmate of Mai Sawaguchi. She is socially inept, has a fear of strangers, and is known to have a very short stature. However, she acts like a wild beast, being depicted as a traditional tsundere character. Because both of her parents are living overseas, she lives alone in a big apartment.

Mai Sawaguchi (沢口 麻衣, Sawaguchi Mai)
Voiced by: Ayaka Izumi
Mai is one of Reo's classmates, who grew up studying at St. Michael's Academy, having attended since kindergarten. Similarly, to her sister, she perceives herself as a "commoner", albeit having spent so much time at St. Michael's Academy. She has two younger siblings: a brother and a sister.

Kaede Kitajima (北嶋 楓, Kitajima Kaede)
Voiced by: Nazuna Gogyō
A second-year student at St. Michael's Academy and a childhood friend of Mai, Kaede is a talented girl who serves as class representative. Although meek and subdued by nature, she has a strong sense of duty, and her classmates have complete confidence in her. She and her cousin Sara are an "officially recognized" couple on campus.

Sara Kitajima (北嶋 紗良, Kitajima Sara)
Voiced by: Satsuki Uri
A first-year student at St. Michael's and Kaede's cousin who is well-known from fashion magazines. Her mother is an actress, making Sara a true thoroughbred. Sara has a charismatic temperament that causes her to unwittingly charm those around her. Her affection for Kaede is in full overdrive, both publicly and privately.

Runa Hōraisen (蓬莱泉 瑠奈, Hōraisen Runa)
Voiced by: Yuki Ueda
Runa is a recent transfer student to St. Michael's Middle School and Takako's lover. She is dominant, has the disposition of a queen, speaks and carries herself like an adult, and has everyone around her wrapped around her finger. Rather than impulsively losing her temper when it comes to Takako, she seems more likely to quietly threaten. Since her parents' whereabouts are unknown, Runa previously lived with her sister in a large apartment until she moved in with her teacher.

Takako Suminoe (墨廼江 貴子, Suminoe Takako)
Voiced by: Yui Azuma
Takako is one of the teachers in the elementary department at St. Michael's Christian School. When Takako was a child, she was a shy young schoolgirl who had an innocent crush on her senpai, Rena. She is currently living with Runa, and tries to teach her to act more childish. Before meeting Rena, she lived with her parents and brother.

Miya Ayase (綾瀬 美夜, Ayase Miya)
Voiced by: Nerine Akimoto
Miya is a student in Year 1's "Snow" class and a classmate of Risa. Though she is a prominent genius on campus, she struggles in social interactions and hates socializing with others. Miya rarely shows her soft side, but when she does, she adopts a somewhat timid demeanor. Miya has been offered the chance to study abroad and has even skipped grades.

Risa Azumi (安曇 璃紗, Azumi Risa)
Voiced by: Kuroi Neko
Risa is the class representative of Year 1's "Snow" class, and a classmate of Miya. She is the half-Japanese daughter of a foreign company.

Rikka Shinozaki (篠崎 六夏, Shinozaki Rikka)
Voiced by: Madoka Midorikawa
Rikka is a first-year student at Saint Michael's Academy, who was admitted from outside the school system on a scholarship. Rikka can't help but intervene whenever she sees someone in trouble, which has made her extremely popular. Serving as Vice Class Representative, she and Class Representative Sayuki were voted Best Couple. Owing to her dependable nature, she has come to be known as "Snow White's Knight".

Sayuki Shirakawa (白河 沙雪, Shirakawa Sayuki)
Voiced by: Yun Sachi
Sayuki is Rikka's fellow classmate. Besides being beautiful and brilliant, she is a talented scholar and athlete who was selected to serve on the Environmental Preservation Committee. Holding such a resounding reputation since middle school, she's being hailed as the first "Ultimate Lady" since the days of alumna Rena Hōraisen. Her grandfather is descended from samurai who are rumoured to have owned a castle, so owing to her name, she has earned the nickname "Snow White".

Eris Shitogi (粢 エリス, Shitogi Eris)
Voiced by: Mio Ōkawa
Eris is an exchange student at St. Michael's Junior College from Russia. She is proficient in Japanese and was formerly the famed proprietor of the "Lily Platinum Fan Club." She is doing a homestay with Shizuku's family while the two of them attend junior college. Eris still makes Shizuku turn briefly tsundere whenever she speaks passionate words of love to her, with no regard for who might be listening. She has a strong rivalry with Reo.

Shizuku Kirishima (霧島 雫, Kirishima Shizuku)
Voiced by: Miei
Shizuku is a third-year student and Japanese beauty who has grown up at St. Michael's Academy. Born to a calligrapher father, Shizuku is highly regarded as "Shizuku-gozen," the scribe of St. Michael's. She is in an openly public relationship with Eris, the former exchange student, and the two of them attend St. Michael's Junior College together.

Rena Hōraisen (蓬莱泉 麗奈, Hōraisen Rena)
Voiced by: Kō Manazuru
Rena is one of the schoolteachers at St. Michael's who has a likeable personality. At the time, she was an alumna of St. Michael's Junior College, and both teachers and students respected her for being well-behaved.

Principal (学校長)
Voiced by: Kou Manazuru
The current school principal at St. Michael's Academy's name is never revealed. She was one of Takako's former schoolteachers when the latter was a St. Michael's student.

=== Angels series ===
Yūno Katakura (片倉 優乃, Katakura Yūno)
Voiced by: Yuka Meriru
A pushy and overprotective girl who is in her first year of nursing school, Yuno is Satsuki's classmate and dorm mate. Fairly protective, she always speaks formally, with deference to others.

Satsuki Ishigami (石神 皐, Ishigami Satsuki)
Voiced by: Hana Anzu
Satsuki is a frank and aloof girl with boyish tendencies. Although she never had much interest in eating, Yuuno has been using her home cooking to draw her out more so that Satsuki would be more straightforward with her expressions of affection, regardless of their surroundings. She also makes an appearance in Yuririn.

Ringo Aihara (相原 りんご, Aihara Ringo)
Voiced by: Shiori Honno
Ringo is a first-year student in nursing school and a graduate of St. Michael's. She is friends with Chiaki, who admired her since they were little. Taking her acceptance to nursing school as an opportunity to become independent from her parents, she lives with Chiaki in her apartment.

Chiaki Takao (高尾 千秋, Takao Chiaki)
Voiced by: Koko Ichinose
A seemingly perfect nurse who is actually somewhat spoiled. She is a nurse in the gastrointestinal surgery ward at Saint Michael's General Hospital.

Akira Inatori (稲取 晶, Inatori Akira)
Voiced by: Suzune Asao

Narumi Hikawa (氷川 成美, Hikawa Narumi)
Voiced by: Hikari Hoshino

=== New Generation series ===
Aya Kimishima (君島 亜弥, Kimishima Aya)
Voiced by: Yūki Kondō
A second-year middle school student who transferred from public school, she and Ai are identical twin sisters, but they have been separated since birth and got together since just half a year ago. With a bright and cheerful disposition, Aya has a submissive streak. She has romantic and sexual feelings for her sister, Ai, but she tries to avoid making them a couple, as she is worried that her parents will be troubled by a "wrong" relationship.

Ai Kimishima (君島 藍, Kimishima Ai)
Voiced by: Nao Tsubakino
Aya's older twin sister, and the class mascot. Although meek and docile, Ai is in fact willful and childish and won't budge once she sets her mind on something. She was kidnapped by the same person that kidnapped Aya, but was immediately turned over to her parents after she and Aya finished playing in the park near the place Aya was raised. She used to be an honor student before Aya transferred in, which worries Aya herself.

Hazuki Onohara (大野原 町葉月, Onohara Hazuki)
Voiced by: Satoru Tanaka
Hazuki is a clumsy transfer student who was admitted in the second term at the annex school. She makes no attempts to hide her humble roots. She would sometimes make silly expressions and only notice them after the incident was already over. She is well-liked by everyone in school. She is Manami's lover.

Manami Suō (蘇枋 愛実, Suō Manami)
Voiced by: Shiina Amane
Manami is a sheltered teenage girl with an air of grace and refinement. Her true personality comes out through her internet idol persona "Mana" (マナ), where she appears cruel and abusive. She is Hazuki's lover. She is considered cruel but always true to others. She would rather be a commoner.

Nagisa Misawa (三澤 渚, Misawa Nagisa)
Voiced by: Ichika Mikazuki
Nagisa is the star of the school's track and field team. She and Rina have been friends, since childhood. While she is observant on the outside, even trying to evade being kissed by Rina in public, when they are in private, she can be somewhat aggressive.

Rina Takahata (高幡 莉菜, Takahata Rina)
Voiced by: Ayase Tomari
Rina is a spoiled and pushy girl who has a particular fondness for Nagisa, always trying to flirt with her. She and Nagisa have been friends, since childhood.

=== Hanahira! ===
Kaori Hanemura (羽村 佳織, Hanemura Kaori)
Voiced by: Eri Kitamura
Kaori, too, is a tsundere who can't be honest about her deep love for Amane. She lives next door to Amane, and attends Saint Michael's Girls Academy with her. Very responsible and straightforward, she fulfills the tsukkomi role very well. However, when Amane's repeated loving advances break down her tsundere wall, she becomes somewhat lovable.

Koharu Uozumi (魚住 小春, Uozumi Koharu)
Voiced by: Misa Tokushima
Koharu is the mascot character among the four friends. Soft-spoken and pure, she emits an "iyashi-kei" charm that captures Makoto's heart. Koharu greatly admires Makoto since she is so much more mature than her. She is a wonderful cook and very handy around the house.

Makoto Tōdō (藤堂 真琴, Tōdō Makoto)
Voiced by: Mami Uchida
Makoto is a reserved girl who dreams about being in a relationship with Koharu.

Amane Yūki (結城 あまね, Yūki Amane)
Voiced by: Yui Sakakibara
Amane is one of the main characters in Hana Hira! She is Kaori's polar opposite, being airheaded, lively, glomping Kaori at every opportunity, and generally lazy. She fails at studying and cooking, and would rather stay up playing games than do anything else.

=== School Confessions ===
Aoi Ōtsuki (大槻 葵, Ōtsuki Aoi)
Aoi is one of the characters in the web series Girls' School Confessions.

Misaki Shitara (設楽 美咲, Shitara Misaki)
Misaki is one of the characters in the web series Girls' School Confessions.

Rin Asō (麻生凛, Asō Rin)
Rin is one of the characters web in the series Girls' School Confessions.

=== Villainess ===
Kurara Inatori (稲取 眩蘭, Inatori Kurara)
Kurara is the main character web series Michael's Villainess.

Eiko Udō (宇藤 英子, Udō Eiko)
Eiko is a character in the web series Michael's Villainess.

Ikue Enobi (栄野比 郁枝, Enobi Ikue)
Ikue is a character in the web series Michael's Villainess.

Maki Tozawa (登沢 真紀, Tozawa Maki)
Maki is a character in the web series Michael's Villainess.

Rushia Inatori (稲取 琉幸, Inatori Rushia)
Rushia is a character in the web series Michael's Villainess.

Sarasa Hōjō (北条 更紗, Hōjō Sarasa)
Sarasa is a character in the web series Michael's Villainess. Her real name is Sayuri Kitajima (北島 紗百合, Kitajima Sayuri), Sara's mother and Kaede's aunt (the younger sister of Kaede's father). She's divorced from her husband from the business world. She's also an alumna of St. Michael's.

Sakura Takai (高井 桜, Takai Sakura)
Sakura is a character in the web series Michael's Villainess.

Saki Miyakozawa (都澤咲, Miyakozawa Saki)
Saki is a character in the web series Michael's Villainess.

== Media ==
=== Visual novels ===
The first title in the series, A Kiss for the Petals was released on November 25, 2006. As of September 2015, fifteen games and two spinoff titles have been released. The fifteenth game in the main series, Remembering How We Met, which was initially released in Japan on Android and iOS, was licensed by MangaGamer and released in English for Microsoft Windows on September 25, 2015. The eleventh game in the main series, Maidens of Michael, was released for Windows in English on February 22, 2018. It was initially available on Steam, however, in April 2018 it was delisted by Valve, ostensibly in response to a malicious false user report according to MangaGamer. It has not returned to Steam since this time; however, it remains available for purchase on MangaGamer's own storefront and GOG.

==== Main series ====
No.	Title	Couple(s)	Original release date
1	"A Kiss for the Petals" "Sono Hanabira ni Kuchizuke wo" (Japanese: その花びらにくちづけを)	Yūna × Nanami	JP: November 25, 2006
On the first day of school, Nanami Oda ends up in an accident, resulting in a senior student from her school coming to her rescue. After meeting Yuna Matsubara, Nanami just cannot stop thinking about her and later decides to join the student council. Later, Nanami catches Yuna doing something very strange (masturbating), while calling out Nanami's name.
2	"My Dear Prince" "Watashi no Ouji-sama" (Japanese: わたしの王子さま)	Sara × Kaede	JP: June 8, 2007
Kaede Kitajima runs into her cousin Sara, and suddenly finds herself sharing a passionate kiss, an act which is seen by multiple onlookers. Because Kaede prefers not to stand out, she instinctively acts coldly towards Sara, that is, until they find themselves alone.
3	"Joined in Love with You" "Anata to Koibito Tsunagi" (Japanese: あなたと恋人つなぎ)	Mai × Reo	JP: August 3, 2007
Mai Sawaguchi tries best to get along with Reo. However, since they are both headstrong, they always end up fighting.
4	"The Beloved Photograph" "Itoshisa no Fotogurafu" (Japanese: 愛しさのフォトグラフ)	Sara × Kaede	JP: June 20, 2008
Kaede still hates to stand-out while Sara's break from work has ended. While wandering in school, Sara suddenly loses her balance, but the worst part is a member of the school paper club took a snapshot. After the students of Mikajou saw the picture, Kaede's fans swarm again, leaving Sara in regret like the last time. Confessing their love again, Kaede asked Sara out and the two go on a date. In an epilogue, Kaede and Sara are shown wearing wedding gowns (10 years in the future).
5	"The Joy of Loving You" "Anata o Suki na Shiawase" (Japanese: あなたを好きな幸せ)	Mai × Reo	JP: August 8, 2008
While Reo is failing her classes, Mai helps her to get a passing grade. To reward Reo for passing her quiz, Mai agrees to go on a date with her. One day during class, Reo is called to the school office and returns acting strangely. After a lot of worrying and probing, Mai is still unaware of what has happened. This results in a fight between Reo and Mai, because Mai feels that Reo does not trust in her enough to share her problems. They eventually make up and declare their love for each other.
6	"A Kiss Whispered to the Lips" "Kuchibiru to Kiss de Tsubuyaite" (Japanese: 唇とキスで呟いて)	Yūna × Nanami	JP: December 19, 2008
Nanami's love affair with one of the school's idols, Yuna, remains a secret. However, they are having trouble concealing their true feelings from everyone.
7	"I Want Your Sweet Enchanting Kisses" "Amakute Hoshikute Torokeru Chū" (Japanese: あまくてほしくてとろけるちゅう)	Runa × Takako	JP: December 15, 2009
This game introduces a new couple: Takako Suminoe, a young and still inexperienced teacher at the elementary department of St. Michael's Academy, and one of her students, the daring ojō-sama Runa Hōraisen.
8	"Dyed with an Angel's Petals" "Tenshi no Hanabira Zome" (Japanese: 天使の花びら染め)	Eris × Shizuku	JP: February 26, 2010
While class representative Shizuku Kirishima takes foreign exchange student Eris Shitogi under her wing, the spark of love settles into her heart. However, Shizuku thinks her nagging personality landed on her crush's bad side.
9	"Sweet Grown-up Kisses" "Amakute Otona no Torokeru Chū" (Japanese: あまくておとなのとろけるちゅう)	Runa × Takako	JP: December 17, 2010
Takako Suminoe and Runa Hōraisen's first date.
10	"Lily Platinum" "Riri.Purachinamu" (Japanese: リリ・プラチナム)	Eris × Shizuku	JP: November 25, 2011
The students create a fan club dedicated to Eris called "Lily Platinum".
11	"Maidens of Michael" "Mikaeru no Otome-tachi" (Japanese: ミカエルの乙女たち)	Risa × Miya, Yūna × Nanami, Sara × Kaede, Mai × Reo, Eris × Shizuku, Runa × Takako	JP: November 30, 2012; NA: February 22, 2018
Risa Azumi gets into a fight with the class troublemaker, Miya Ayase. As long-time couples and spur-of-the-moment flings alike were flirtatiously carrying on, the whole school is abuzz with excitement over the "St. Michael's Best Couple" poll being conducted by the student volunteers. Resigning themselves the whims of highschool, the two decided to go along with it.
12	"Lovers of the Atelier" "Atorie no Koibito-tachi" (Japanese: アトリエの恋人たち)	Risa × Miya	JP: March 29, 2013
The dust has settled from the boisterous Best Couple's events, and Risa has returned to her laid-back daily life. Although Miya continues to flaunt her chronic truancy in Risa's face, their days are full of joy. They once again find themselves passing the time in the attic of the old school building, in the secret atelier known only to them. Risa asks Miya to tell her the story of how she discovered this place.
13	"Snow White's Knight" "Shirayuki no Kishi" (Japanese: 白雪の騎士)	Rikka x Sayuki, Risa × Miya, Yūna × Nanami, Sara × Kaede, Mai × Reo	JP: December 20, 2013
Risa, now a second year in high school, has been hearing around campus that the new freshmen are bubbling over with excitement for the Best Couples poll. Risa was selected as a Best Couple along with Miya due to a misconception with her classmates. Although she rejected it at first, the two of them are now in love as they spend their days together. This year's freshmen are Sayuki Shirakawa, a talented scholar and athlete who is being hailed as "The Perfect Lady", along with Rikka Shinozaki, a girl who set a national record in the 100 meter dash shortly after enrolling.
14	"My Sworn Love for You" "Anata ni Chikau Ai" (Japanese: あなたに誓う愛)	Eris × Shizuku	JP: May 31, 2014
15	"Remembering How We Met" "Deatta Koro no Omoide ni" (Japanese: 出会った頃の思い出に)	Risa × Miya	JP: March 13, 2015; NA: September 23, 2015
Risa and Miya reminisce on how they first met, and what they were like before they became a couple.
16	"The Day we First Met" "Hajimete Deatta Ano Hi Kara" (Japanese: 初めて出逢ったあの日から)	Risa × Miya	JP: October 28, 2016
This episode is the Microsoft Windows version of Remembering How We Met with added H scenes.

==== Angels series ====
The Angels series is a spin-off involving select couplings of nurses of the corresponding St. Michael's General Hospital. These releases can be identified with a blue coloring.

No.	Title	Couple(s)	Original release date
1	"The Angel's Longing" "Tenshi no Akogare" (Japanese: 天使のあこがれ)	Chiaki x Ringo	JP: May 31, 2013
Ringo Aihara, a first year at nursing school, has decided to room with Chiaki Takao, an old family friend. However, once they actually start living together, Ringo comes to realize that Chiaki takes much worse care of herself than she had imagined, and is at the same time a very physically affectionate person.
2	"The Angels' Spring Love" "Tenshi-tachi no Harukoi" (Japanese: 天使たちの春恋)	Yūno x Satsuki	JP: August 31, 2013
Yūno had just been admitted to nursing school and was eager to watch over her classmate/roommate, Satsuki. Satsuki was admitted to nursing school with top marks, but she wasn't very aware of her surroundings, and she fully lacked the ability to get by on her own. From then on, Yūno spent her days fulfilled in the role of an accomplished older girl taking care of an inept young lady.
3	"The Angels' Promise" "Tenshi-tachi no Yaksoku" (Japanese: 天使たちの約束)	Narumi x Akira	JP: March 28, 2014

==== New Generation series ====
A series featuring students from the annex school. It can be identified by the color green in the subtitles.

No.	Title	Couple(s)	Original release date
1	"The New Generation!" "Nyū Jene!" (Japanese: にゅーじぇね！)	Rina × Nagisa, Ai × Aya, Hazuki × Manami	JP: June 26, 2015; NA: November 25, 2016
2	"Revolution! Rinagisa" "Reboryūshon! Rinagisa" (Japanese: れぼりゅーしょん！ りなぎさ)	Rina x Nagisa	JP: December 25, 2015

==== Other spinoffs ====
No.	Title	Couple(s)	Original release date
1	"Hanahira!" (Japanese: はなひらっ！)	Kaori x Amane, Makoto x Koharu	JP: September 25, 2010
Created to appeal to a more general audience. This game takes place in a separate continuity from the main and Angels series and introduces four brand new characters.
2	"Yuririn" (Japanese: ゆりりん)	Risa x Miya, Mai x Reo, Rikka x Sayuki	JP: November 20, 2015

=== Light novels ===
A light novel series written by Shinichirō Sano and illustrated by Peko is being published by Luminocity. The first volume was released on August 19, 2007, and since then, there have been a total of fourteen volumes released.

No.	Title	Couple(s)	Original release date
1	Christmas for the Two of Us (二人のクリスマス)	Nanami × Yūna	December 31, 2006
2	Vacation for the Two of Us (二人のバカンス)	Kaede × Sara	August 19, 2007
3	Summer for the Two of Us (二人の熱い夏)	Mai × Reo	August 19, 2007
4	Valentines for the Two of Us (二人のバレンタイン)	Nanami × Yūna	December 22, 2007
5	The Curtain Call Never Ends (カーテンコールは終わらない)	Kaede × Sara	August 8, 2008
6	One More Lovers Kiss (愛のキスをもういちど)	Mai × Reo	February 20, 2009
	Extra Story (番外総集編)	Nanami × Yūna	August 7, 2009
7	Bewitching Kiss on the Southern Island! (南の島であまとろちゅ!)	Takako × Runa	December 25, 2009
8	A Valentine Rhapsody (バレンタイン狂騒曲)	Eris × Shizuku	February 26, 2010
9	Tight Summer Squeeze! (夏をぎゅっとね!)	Mai × Reo	August 14, 2010
10	Couple's Goal Tape! (二人のゴールテープ!)	Takako × Runa	December 17, 2010
11	Wrapped In Your Warmth (ぬくもりに包まれて)	Eris × Shizuku	December 10, 2011
	Extra Story 2 (番外総集編 2)	Kaede × Sara	June 24, 2011
12	Spring Splash (スプリング・スプラッシュ)	Risa × Miya	December 31, 2012

=== Drama CDs ===
On December 22, 2007, three drama CDs were published, containing stories with the characters from the first six games. On November 27, 2010, a fourth drama CD was announced.

No.	Title	Couple(s)	Original release date
1	Eternal Blissful Kiss (ずっと幸せなキス Zutto Shiawase na Kiss)	Yūna × Nanami	December 31, 2007
2	Kaede-chan Super Mode (楓ちゃんスーパーモード Kaede-chan Super Mode)	Sara × Kaede	February 20, 2009
3	Eternal Summer with You (ずっといっしょの夏 Zutto Issho no Natsu)	Mai × Reo	August 13, 2009
4	Dream-like Days (夢のような日々 Yume no you na Hibi)	Yūna × Nanami	December 17, 2010
5	Diary of a Live-in Girlfriend (通い妻だいありぃ Kayoizuma Diary)	Mai × Reo	December 30, 2011
6	Kaede-chan's Newlywed Cooking (楓ちゃんの新妻クッキング Kaede-chan no Niizuma Kukkingu)	Sara × Kaede	August 10, 2012
7	A Cozy Spring Vacation (いちゃラブ春休み Icha Rabu Haru Yasumi)	Risa × Miya	December 28, 2012
8	Reo's Days of Decadent Reward (玲緒のわがままご褒美デイズ Reo no Wagamama Gohoubi Deizu)	Mai × Reo	December 28, 2012
9	Risa's Golden Vacation (璃紗のゴールデンバケーション Risa no Gooruden Bakeeshon)	Risa × Miya	May 26, 2013
10	Our Life on Campus (ふたりのキャンパスライフ Futari no Campus Life)	Eris × Shizuku	August 10, 2013
11	Dark-haired Lovers (黒髪の恋人 Kurokami no Koibito)	Mai × Reo	August 9, 2013
12	The Season of Hydrangeas (あじさいの季節 Ajisai no Kisetsu)	Chiaki x Ringo	August 9, 2013
13	Our Private Morning Straight from a Movie (映画みたいな二人の朝 Eiga Mitai na Futari no Asa)	Risa × Miya	December 31, 2013
14	Kitten Love (仔猫な恋人 Koneko na Koibito)	Rikka x Sayuki	December 31, 2013
15	It's Just Like Being in a Long Dream (それはまるで長い夢 Sore wa Maru de Nagai Yume)	Yūno x Satsuki	April 28, 2014
16	With You 'Till Morning (朝まで、ずっと Asa Made, Zutto)	Eris × Shizuku	August 16, 2014
17	My Darling Lover (可愛い私の恋人 Kawaii Watashi no Koibito)	Runa × Takako	August 16, 2014
18	Christmas, Three Days Late (3日おくれのクリスマス San Nichi Okure no Kurisumasu)	Mai × Reo	December 30, 2014
19	The Angels' Date Night (天使たちの恋人デート Tenshi-tachi no Koibito Deeto)	Narumi x Akira	March 27, 2015
20	My Extraordinary Lover (ワタシの素敵な恋人 Watashi no Suteki na Koibito)	Rikka x Sayuki	August 16, 2015
21	Happiness☆Sweets (幸せ☆スイーツ Shiawase☆Suiitsu)	Ai × Aya	August 16, 2015
22	The Spoiled Princess and the Snow Prince (甘え姫と雪の王子さま Amae Hime to Yuki no Ouji-sama)	Sara × Kaede	December 31, 2015
23	A Kiss Heralds Happiness (幸せの訪れるキス Shiawase no Otozureru Kisu)	Rina x Nagisa	December 31, 2015
24	Remember Our Love Again (愛の記憶をもういちど Ai no Kioku wo Mou Ichido)	Risa × Miya	October 14, 2016
25	Making Up Like Never Before (かつてない仲なおり Katsutenai Naka Naori)	Mai × Reo	January 4, 2017

=== Anime OVA ===
An anime OVA titled Sono Hanabira ni Kuchizuke o: Anata to Koibito Tsunagi (その花びらにくちづけを: あなたと恋人つなぎ; lit. "A Kiss for the Petals: Becoming Your Lover") was produced by ChuChu, directed by Masayuki Sakoi, and was released in Japan on July 30, 2010. Based on the third game, it follows Mai and Reo after they confess their love to one another. To coincide the release of the OVA, the third game was re-released with some improvements and typographical error correction.
