= MangaGamer =

Japanese-based visual novel localizer and distributor

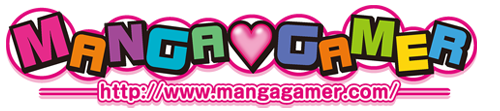
- Status: Active
- Founded: 2008
- Founder: Overdrive, Tarte, Nexton, Circus
- Country of origin: Japan
- Distribution: Worldwide
- Fiction genres: Visual novel
- Official website: www.mangagamer.com

MangaGamer is a video game publisher specializing in the English localization and distribution of Japanese eroge and visual novels. It is run by Japanese-based company Japan Animation Contents.

== History ==
MangaGamer was originally envisioned as a company that would sell Japanese visual novels overseas by Hiroshi Takeuchi, also known under his alias Bamboo, president of Japanese eroge development company Overdrive. Due to the cost involved, he convinced several other Japanese eroge companies (Tarte, Nexton and Circus) to take part in a joint venture.

Due to this setup, the initial lineup of titles consisted of titles produced by companies involved in MangaGamer's creation, with Navel soon joining with their first title, Shuffle!. These early titles were translated by native Japanese speakers involved with parent companies, which resulted in a subpar quality.

After complaints from fans, it was announced that a complete re-translation of Edelweiss was in progress. Starting with Soul Link, translation and editing is handled by an international team of native English speakers, resulting in an increased quality. The company itself is headed by a relative of Takeuchi, and a core Japanese staff is spread between the involved Japanese companies.

At their panel at Otakon 2011, MangaGamer announced that they are expanding their business into digital distribution of erotic manga (by Japanese publisher Akane Shinsha) and anime (by Discovery).

== Relations with fan translators ==
MangaGamer has served as a mediator in talks between several fan translation groups and Japanese game companies that ended in deals made to officially release said translations through MangaGamer. Their games include Kara no Shōjo by Innocent Grey and Ef: A Fairy Tale of the Two. by Minori. MangaGamer also distributed for a time the Japanese versions of several games created by the dōjin circle 07th Expansion (Umineko no Naku Koro ni, Higanbana no Saku Yoru ni, Rose Guns Days) for explicit use of the respective English fan translations.

== Distribution ==
Originally, MangaGamer sold their titles exclusively via digital distribution, and it remains their primary release channel. During the Anime Expo 2010 and Otakon 2010 conventions, physical disks were sold with the first four games in the Higurashi When They Cry series and Kira Kira All-Ages. Those games were later sold by HimeyaShop and Hendane!.com.

In January 2011, a collaboration was announced between Hendane!.com and MangaGamer resulting in the sale of physical copies of Da Capo Limited Edition through Hendane!.com. In July 2011, J-List became the primary North American distributor of physical copies for all current MangaGamer titles, except Da Capo LE. Around the same time, MangaGamer opened their own webshop for physical copies aimed at European customers.

== Product list ==
Marketed title	Japanese title	Japanese developer	Release date	Notes
Edelweiss	Ēderuwaisu (エーデルワイス)	Overdrive	July 10, 2008	Re-released on September 2, 2011, with a new and improved translation
Which girl should I choose?	Hinatabokko (ひなたぼっこ)	Tarte	July 10, 2008	
My sex slave is a classmate	Boku no Mesu Hisho wa Doukyuusei (僕の牝秘書は同級生)	Liquid	July 24, 2008	Removed from MangaGamer's website on June 4, 2009, restored on October 30, 2009
Tasty Shafts	Oishii Bō ga 2-hon (美味しい棒が2本)	Psycho	December 10, 2008	
Shera, My Witch	Sakkyuba☆Soon! (さっきゅば☆SOON!)	Score	December 20, 2008	
Da Capo	D.C. ~Da・Kāpo~ (D.C.～ダ・カーポ～)	Circus	December 25, 2008	Limited edition hard copy published on March 29, 2011
Suika A.S+	Suika A.S＋~SUIKA~ (水夏A.S＋~SUIKA~)	Circus & Moonstone	April 25, 2009	
Kira Kira	Kira☆Kira (キラ☆キラ)	Overdrive	June 24, 2009	
Shuffle!	Shuffle!	Navel	August 15, 2009	
Suck my dick or die!	Ryoujoku Gerira Gari (凌辱ゲリラ狩り)	Liquid	October 30, 2009	Removed from MangaGamer's website on June 4, 2009, restored and released on October 30, 2009
Higurashi When They Cry	Higurashi no Naku Koro ni (ひぐらしのなく頃に)	07th Expansion	December 15, 2009	Contains the first four games in the series
Soul Link	Souru Rinku (ソウルリンク)	Navel	December 28, 2009	
Sandwiched by my wife and her sister	Shimai Don ~Shirudaku de~ (姉妹丼～汁だくで～)	Psycho	January 20, 2010	
Kira Kira All-Ages Version	Kira☆Kira (キラ☆キラ)	Overdrive	January 31, 2010	Translation used in iOS version published by Mtrix
Cosplay Alien	Kosutte Eirian -Yūwaku no Kosupure H- (コスってエイリアン -誘惑のコスプレH-)	Score	February 20, 2010	
Higurashi When They Cry Kai "Meakashi"	Higurashi no Naku Koro ni Kai Maekashi-hen (ひぐらしのなく頃に解 目明し編)	07th Expansion	February 28, 2010	
Edelweiss Eiden Fantasia	Ēderuwaisu Eiden Fantajia (エーデルワイス 詠伝ファンタジア)	Overdrive	March 20, 2010	Edelweiss fandisc
Higurashi When They Cry Kai "Tsumihoroboshi"	Higurashi no Naku Koro ni Kai Tsumihoroboshi-hen (ひぐらしのなく頃に解 罪滅し編)	07th Expansion	April 15, 2010	
Kira Kira Curtain Call	Kira☆Kira Kātenkōru (キラ☆キラ カーテンコール)	Overdrive	April 30, 2010	Kira Kira sequel and fandisc
Higurashi When They Cry Kai "Minagoroshi"	Higurashi no Naku Koro ni Kai Minagoroshi-hen (ひぐらしのなく頃に解 皆殺し編)	07th Expansion	May 31, 2010	
Higurashi When They Cry Kai "Matsuribayashi"	Higurashi no Naku Koro ni Kai Matsuribayashi-hen (ひぐらしのなく頃に解 祭囃し編)	07th Expansion	July 15, 2010	
Da Capo Innocent Finale	D.C.I.F. ~Da・Kāpo~ Inosento Fināre (D.C.I.F.～ダ・カーポ～イノセントフィナーレ)	Circus	November 30, 2010	Da Capo "alternative version" with the focus on Kotori Shirakawa
Da Capo 2	D.C.II ~Da・KāpoII~ (D.C.II ～ダ・カーポII～)	Circus	December 24, 2010	Limited edition hard copy published on July 1, 2011
Higurashi When They Cry Kai Bundle Pack	Higurashi no Naku Koro ni Kai (ひぐらしのなく頃に解)	07th Expansion	February 10, 2011	Last four games bundled
Koihime Musou: A Heart-Throbbing, Maidenly Romance of the Three Kingdoms	Koihime † Musō ~Doki ☆ Otome Darake no Sangokushi Engi~ (恋姫†無双～ドキッ☆乙女だらけの三国志演義～)	BaseSon	February 28, 2011	Released without voices, but after 2,000 sold copies, an update to add voices was announced
Guilty: The SiN	Zaishuu-The SiN- (罪囚-The SiN-)	Tactics	March 14, 2011	
Kotori Love Ex P	Kotori Love Ex P (ことり Love Ex P)	Circus	April 29, 2011	Da Capo fan disc, a bundle of various chapters from across the franchise that focuses on Kotori Shirakawa
Kara no Shoujo	Kara no Shōjo (殻ノ少女)	Innocent Grey	June 29, 2011	Originally released without voices (released later as a new version or upgrade patch)
We Love Master!	Goshujin-sama Dāisuki (ご主人様だーいすき)	Score	August 1, 2011	
Go! Go! Nippon! ~My First Trip to Japan~	Go! Go! Nippon! (ゴー！ゴー！日本！)	Overdrive	September 30, 2011	Originally written for the English market
Conquering the Queen	Mashō no Nie (魔将の贄)	Liquid	October 28, 2011	
Harem Party	Hāremu☆Pātī (ハーレム☆パーティー)	Tactics	November 25, 2011	
Deardrops	Deadoroppusu (ディアドロップス)	Overdrive	March 2, 2012	
Magical Teacher: My Teacher's a Mage?	Majikaru Tīchā Sensei wa Majo? (まじかるティーチャー 先生は魔女?)	Score	April 13, 2012	
EVE burst error	EVE burst error	C's Ware	April 27, 2012	
Dengeki Stryker	Dengeki Sutoraikā (電激ストライカー)	Overdrive	June 22, 2012	
Ef: The First Tale.	Ef: The First Tale.	Minori	July 27, 2012	
Sexy Demon Transformation	Kozukuri Youkai H Henka ~Otome o Okasu Hyoui Gattai~ (子作り妖怪H変化～乙女を犯す憑依合体～)	Softhouse-Seal	September 14, 2012	
Boob Wars: Big Boobs vs Flat Chests	Oppai Sensō - Kyonyū VS Hinnyū - (おっぱい戦争 -巨乳VS貧乳-)	Softhouse-Seal	October 19, 2012	
Otoboku - Maidens Are Falling for Me!	Otome wa Boku ni Koishiteru (処女はお姉さまに恋してる)	Caramel Box	November 23, 2012	
Slave Witch April ~Sexy Magic Training~	Reizoku no Majo April ~Injoku no Mahou Choukyou~ (隷属の魔女エイプリル～淫辱の魔法調教～)	Aconite	December 21, 2012	
SSSS: Super Secret Sexy Spy	Nakadashi Spy no Sounyū Sousa -Shikyū no Heiwa wa Ore ga Mamoru!- (中出しスパイの挿入捜査 -子宮の平和は俺が守る!-)	Softhouse-Seal	April 3, 2013	
Tick! Tack!	Tick! Tack!	Navel	April 26, 2013	
Orion Heart	Orion Hāto ~Injoku no Suku Mizu Sailor Senshi~ (オリオンハート～淫辱のスク水セーラー戦士～)	Portion	May 24, 2013	
Throb! The Greatest Inventions of the Sexy Era! ~Second Science Club–A Secret Society of Love, Rage, and Sorrow~	Todoroke Seiki no Daihatsumei Ai to Okori to Kanashimi no Himitsu Kessha Dai Ni Kagakubu (轟け性紀の大発明 愛と怒りと悲しみの秘密結社第二科学部)	Softhouse-Seal	June 21, 2013	
Harukoi Otome ~Greetings from the Maidens' Garden~	Harukoi Otome ~Otome no Sono de Gokigenyō~ (春恋＊乙女～乙女の園でごきげんよう。～)	BaseSon	August 9, 2013	
Eroge! Sex and Games Make Sexy Games	Eroge! ~H mo Gēmu mo Kaihatsu Zanmai~ (えろげー！～Hもゲームも開発三昧～)	CLOCKUP	September 13, 2013	
Umineko no Naku Koro ni	Umineko no Naku Koro ni (うみねこのなく頃に)	07th Expansion	October 4, 2013	Japanese version
Umineko no Naku Koro ni Chiru	Umineko no Naku Koro ni Chiru (うみねこのなく頃に散)	07th Expansion	October 4, 2013	Japanese version
Cum on! Bukkake Ranch! ~Rear Elementals Into Wet, Horny Girls!~	Sēeki! Bukkake Bokujō! ~Oshiru Ippai, Seirei-tachi o H ni Shiiku!~ (セーエキ！ぶっかけ牧場！ ～お汁いっぱい、精霊達をHに飼イク！～)	Softhouse-Seal	October 18, 2013	
Ruby Striker	Ruby Striker (ルビーストライカー)	MorningStar	October 25, 2013	
Demon Master Chris	Daemon Masutā Kurisu (デーモンマスタークリス)	Nyaatrap	October 31, 2013	
Touma Kojirou's Detective File -Murder at the Opera House-	Touma Kojirou no Tantei File ~Opera Za no Kaijin Satsujin Jiken~ (冬馬小次郎の探偵FILE ～オペラ座の怪人殺人事件～)	Softhouse-Seal	November 28, 2013	
Warrior Princess Asuka	Touki Reijou Asuka ~Bakunyuu Oujo ni Karamitsuku Shokushu to Slime (闘姫隷嬢 アスカ ～爆乳王女に絡みつく触手とスライム)	MorningStar	November 29, 2013	
Ef: The Latter Tale.	Ef: The Latter Tale.	Minori	December 20, 2013	
Valkyrie Svia	Ikusa Otome Suvia (戦乙女スヴィア)	Black Lilith	January 24, 2014	
Rose Guns Days	Rōzu Ganzu Deizu (ローズガンズデイズ)	07th Expansion	February 7, 2014	Japanese version
Higanbana no Saku Yoru ni	Higanbana no Saku Yoru ni (彼岸花の咲く夜に)	07th Expansion	February 7, 2014	Japanese version
Ultimate☆Boob Wars!! ~Big Breasts vs Flat Chests~	Zettai Saikyou ☆ Oppai Sensou!! ~Kyonyuu Oukoku vs Hinnyuu Oukoku~ (ぜったい最胸☆おっぱい戦争!! ～巨乳王国vs貧乳王国～)	Softhouse-Seal GRANDEE	February 21, 2014	
Chou Dengeki Stryker	Chou Dengeki Sutoraikā (超電激ストライカー)	Overdrive	March 28, 2014	
Milles, Knight of Anal Tyranny ~Impregnated by Lusty Tentacles at the Ends of Oblivion~	Kougyaku no Kishi Miles -Boukyaku no Hate, Inshoku Jutai- (肛虐の騎士ミレス -忘却の果て、淫触受胎-)	Devil-Seal	April 25, 2014	
Lapis Gunner	Rapisu Gannā (ラピスガンナー)	MorningStar	May 9, 2014	
Really? Really!	Really? Really!	Navel	June 6, 2014	
Hypno-training My Mother and Sister	Oyako Saiin Chiiku ~ Konna Ore ni Uzuite Modaero! (母妹催淫恥育 ～こんな俺に疼いて悶えろ!)	Ame no Murakumo	June 20, 2014	
Armored Warrior Iris	Soukou Kijo Iris (装甲騎女イリス)	Black Lilith	July 18, 2014	
Imouto Paradise!	Imouto Paradise! ~Onii-chan to Go nin no Imouto no Ecchi Shimakuri na Mainichi~ (妹ぱらだいす！～お兄ちゃんと5人の妹のエッチしまくりな毎日～)	Moonstone Cherry	August 22, 2014	
Obscene Medical Records of a Married Nurse	Hitozuma Nurse no Inraku Karte (人妻ナースの淫落カルテ)	Ame no Murakumo	September 5, 2014	
d2b VS DEARDROPS -Cross the Future-	d2b VS DEARDROPS -Cross the Future-	Overdrive	September 26, 2014	
Cartagra ~Affliction of the Soul~	Cartagra ~Tsuki kurui no Yamai~ (カルタグラ～ツキ狂イノ病～)	Innocent Grey	October 31, 2014	
Royal Guard Melissa	Kokou Kishi Melissa ~Hangyaku Onna Kishi Ishukan Kanraku~ (孤高騎士メリッサ～反逆女騎士異種姦陥落～)	MorningStar	November 14, 2014	
Secret Sorrow of the Siblings	Kyoudai Hiai ~Iya na no ni, Kanjichau~ (兄妹秘哀 ～イヤなのに、カンじちゃう～)	Appetite	November 28, 2014	
Space Pirate Sara	Uchuu Kaizoku Sara (宇宙海賊サラ)	Black Lilith	December 26, 2014	
Eden* They Were Only Two, On The Planet	Eden* They Were Only Two, On The Planet	Minori	January 30, 2015	
No, Thank You!!!	No, Thank You!!!	parade	February 27, 2015	
Princess Evangile	Purinsesu Evanjīru (プリンセスエヴァンジール)	Moonstone	March 27, 2015	
Amber Breaker	Anbā Bureikā (アンバーブレイカー)	MorningStar	April 17, 2015	
Forbidden Love with My Wife’s Sister	Yome no Imouto to no Inai ~Tsuma ni Kakurete Majiwaru Otto to Gimai~ (嫁の妹との淫愛～妻に隠れて交わる夫と義妹～)	Appetite	May 29, 2015	
Free Friends	Furifure (フリフレ)	Noesis	June 26, 2015	
Sweet Sweat in Summer	Natsuiro Mikan ~Ecchi na Shōjo to Shitataru Nioi~ (夏色蜜汗 ～えっちな少女としたたる匂い～)	Ammolite	July 31, 2015	
Asuka Final Chapter	Touki Reijou Asuka Saihuu Shou Owarinaki Oyako Shujuu Kaizou Sanran Jigoku (闘姫隷嬢アスカ最終章 終わりなき母娘主従改造産卵地獄)	MorningStar	August 28, 2015	
A Kiss for the Petals - Remembering How We Met	Sono Hanabira ni Kuchizuke o - Deatta Koro no Omoide ni (その花びらにくちづけを 出逢った頃の思い出に)	St. Michael Girls' School	September 25, 2015	
Go! Go! Nippon! ver.2015	Go! Go! Nippon! ver.2015 (ゴー！ゴー！日本！ ver.2015)	Overdrive	October 16, 2015	
Kara no Shoujo: The Second Episode	Kara no Shōjo (虚ノ少女)	Innocent Grey	October 30, 2015	
Euphoria	Yūforia (ユーフォリア)	CLOCKUP	November 27, 2015	
Gahkthun of the Golden Lightning -What a radiant brave-	Ourai no Gahkthun -What a shining braves- (黄雷のガクトゥーン -What a shining braves-)	Liar-soft	December 23, 2015	
Free Friends 2	Furifure 2 (フリフレ2)	Noesis	January 26, 2016	
Kindred Spirits on the Roof	Okujou no Yurirei-san (屋上の百合霊さん)	Liar-soft	February 12, 2016	
Beat Blades Haruka	Chōkō Sennin Haruka (超昂閃忍ハルカ)	AliceSoft	March 1, 2016	
Tokyo Babel	Toukyou Baberu (東京バベル)	Propeller	March 31, 2016	
Ozmafia!!	Ozmafia!!	Poni-Pachet	April 29, 2016	
The House in Fata Morgana	Fata morgana no Yakata (ファタモルガーナの館)	Novectacle	May 13, 2016	
My Boss' Wife is My Ex	Joushi no Tsuma wa, Motokano Deshita ~Iyagari Nagaramo, Makura Eigyō ni Oborete Iku After 5~ (上司の妻は、元カノでした ～嫌がりながらも、枕営業に溺れていくアフター5～)	Appetite	May 31, 2016	
Supipara - Alice the magical conductor. Chapter #01 - Spring Has Come!	Supipara (すぴぱら)	Minori	July 29, 2016	
Myth	Myth	Circletempo	October 28, 2016	
Himawari -Pebble in the Sky-	Himawari -Pebble in the Sky- (ひまわり -Pebble in the Sky-)	Blank Note	December 9, 2016	
Rance 5D - The Lonely Girl & Rance VI - Collapse of Zeth	Rance 5D - Hitoribocchi no Onna no Ko - (ランス５Ｄ －ひとりぼっちの女の子－) / Rance VI - Zeth Houkai - (RanceVI -ゼス崩壊-)	AliceSoft	December 23, 2016	
Da Capo 3 R	D.C. III R ~Da Capo III R~ (D.C.III R ～ダ・カーポIIIアール～)	Circus	January 20, 2017	
Da Capo 3 R X-Rated	D.C. III R ~Da Capo III R~ X-rated (D.C.III R ～ダ・カーポIIIアール～X-rated)	Circus	January 20, 2017	
Kuroinu - Chapter 1	Kuroinu ~Kedakaki Seijo wa Hakudaku ni Somaru~ (黒獣～気高き聖女は白濁に染まる～)	Liquid	March 31, 2017	
The Shadows of Pygmalion	Negai no Kakera to Hakugin no Agureemento (願いの欠片と白銀の契約者)	Propeller	February 24, 2017	
Princess Evangile W Happiness	Purinsesu Evanjīru W Hapinesu (プリンセスエヴァンジールWハピネス)	Moonstone	July 28, 2017	
Hadaka Shitsuji - Naked Butlers	Hadaka Shitsuji (裸執事)	Mada Labo	October 27, 2017	
Kuroinu - Chapter 2	Kuroinu ~Kedakaki Seijo wa Hakudaku ni Somaru~ (黒獣～気高き聖女は白濁に染まる～)	Liquid	November 17, 2017	
Imouto Paradise 2	Imouto Paradise! 2: Onii-chan to Go nin no Imouto no Motto! Ecchi Shimakuri na Mainichi (妹ぱらだいす！2 ～お兄ちゃんと5人の妹のも～っと！エッチしまくりな毎日～)	Moonstone Cherry	December 22, 2017	
Kuroinu - Chapter 3	Kuroinu ~Kedakaki Seijo wa Hakudaku ni Somaru~ (黒獣～気高き聖女は白濁に染まる～)	Liquid	May 31, 2018	
Evenicle	Ibunikuru (イブニクル)	AliceSoft	June 28, 2018	
Trinoline	Torino Line (トリノライン)	Minori	April 18, 2019	
The Expression Amrilato	Kotonoha Amurirāto (ことのはアムリラート)	SukeraSparo	June 13, 2019	
Sengoku Rance	Sengoku Rance (戦国ランス)	AliceSoft	September 19, 2019	
Hashihime of the Old Book Town	Koshotengai no Hashihime (古書店街の橋姫)	ADELTA	September 26, 2019	
Bokuten – Why I Became an Angel	Boku ga Tenshi ni Natta Wake (僕が天使になった理由)	Overdrive	December 21, 2019	
OshiRabu: Waifus Over Husbandos	Oshi no Love yori Koi no Love (推しのラブより恋のラブ)	SukeraSomero	February 28, 2020	
Making＊Lovers	Making＊Lovers	SMEE	April 4, 2020	
Beat Angel Escalayer R	Chōkō Tenshi Esukareiyā Ribūto (超昂天使エスカレイヤー・リブート)	AliceSoft	June 11, 2020	
Room No. 9	Room No. 9	parade	August 6, 2020	
Rance 01 -Quest for Hikari- & Rance 02 -The Rebellious Maidens-	Rance 01 - Hikari o Motomete - (ランス01 光をもとめて) / Rance 02 Kai - Hangyaku no Shoujo-tachi - (ランス02改 反逆の少女たち)	AliceSoft	October 29, 2020	
Rance Quest Magnum	Rance Quest Magnum (ランス・クエスト マグナム)	AliceSoft	February 25, 2021	
OshiRabu: Waifus Over Husbandos～Love or die～	Oshi no Love yori Koi no Love ~Love or Die~ (推しのラブより恋のラブ ～ラブ・オア・ダイ～)	SukeraSparo	July 30, 2021	
Love Sweets	Love Sweets	Moonstone	October 28, 2021	
Erovoice	Ero Voice! H na Voice de Icha Love Success ♪ (えろぼいす！ Hなボイスでいちゃラブサクセス♪)	CLOCKUP	February 24, 2022	
UUUltraC	Uuultra C (ウウウルトラC)	ADELTA	March 24, 2022	
Seventh Lair	Seventh Coat (セブンスコート)	Novect	March 31, 2022	
The Patient S Remedy	Kanja S no Kyuusai (患者Ｓの救済)	Mada Labo	June 24, 2022	
The Future Radio and the Artificial Pigeons	Mirai Radio to Jinkou-bato (未来ラジオと人工鳩)	Laplacian	February 17, 2023	
Rance IX - The Helmanian Revolution	Rance IX - Helman Kakumei (ランスIX－ヘルマン革命－)	AliceSoft	February 23, 2023	
Nightmare x Onmyoji	Nightmare x Onmyoji ~Kindan no Paradox~ (Nightmare×Onmyoji～禁断のパラドックス～)	Guilty Nightmare Project	March 23, 2023	
Sona-Nyl of the Violet Shadows	Shiei no Sona-Nyl ～What a beautiful memorie～ (紫影のソナーニル～What a beautiful memorie～)	Liar-soft	December 7, 2023	
Lkyt.	Lkyt.	parade	April 20, 2023	
DEAD DAYS	DEAD DAYS	CLOCKUP	October 31, 2024	
Beat Valkyrie Ixseal	Choukou Shinki Ixseal (超昂神騎エクシール)	AliceSoft	February 27, 2025	
Rance 03 - The Fall of Leazas	Rance 03 - Leazas Kanraku (ランス03 リーザス陥落)	AliceSoft	March 27, 2025	
The Pillagers of Raillore	Raillore no Ryakudatsusha (レイルロアの略奪者)	3rdEye	May 29, 2025	
Luckydog1	Luckydog1	Tennenouji	August 28, 2025	
