= No, Thank You!!! =

2013 video game

- Cover art, featuring (left to right) Hiroyuki, Haru, Ryu, Maki, and Kouichi
- Developer(s): Parade
- Publisher(s): JP: Parade; WW: MangaGamer
- Platform(s): Microsoft Windows
- Release: JP: June 28, 2013; WW: February 27, 2015
- Genre(s): Visual novel
- Mode(s): Single-player

No, Thank You!!! is an erotic BL-themed visual novel video game developed by Parade for Microsoft Windows. It was released in Japan in 2013, and worldwide in English by MangaGamer in 2015.

== Synopsis ==
No, Thank You!!! follows a young man as he recovers from a car accident where he was hit to protect a bystander. Having lost his memories, he is taken in by the man he saved. But as he slowly gets his feet under him, working at the man's own bar, he learns the place is the scene of some shady goings-on.

== Development ==
The game was developed by Parade, an at the time newly founded brand for boys love visual novels; most of the staff were employees at the eroge developer Clockup.

Shigeo Hamashima served as concept artist, illustrator and graphic designer for the game. Like most other Parade staff, this was her first work for a boys love game. One major difference compared to her previous works was that the art had to show multiple male characters' faces on screen at the same time; in eroge marketed for men, the art is often drawn from a male character's point of view, with the aim to keep his face out of the shot. She did research in preparation for No, Thank You!!!, and consulted with other women to see how far she could go with her more explicit portrayal of sex while still having it be appealing to women, as well as whether she would be able to portray the characters in a masculine way rather than a "sparkly-clean, romanticized one". While she had to follow Japanese obscenity laws by adding mosaic pixelization to the art, she still drew details underneath, as she hoped that someone would get to see the uncensored art at some point.

In 2013, Parade announced that an original video animation based on the game was being worked on.
