= Kara no Shōjo =

2008 video game

- Developer: Innocent Grey
- Publishers: JP: Innocent Grey; WW: MangaGamer; WW: Shiravune
- Director: Miki Sugina
- Artist: Miki Sugina
- Writer: Miya Suzuka
- Composer: Manyo
- Platform: Microsoft Windows
- Release: Original: JP: July 4, 2008; WW: June 29, 2011; HD Remaster: JP: December 12, 2019; WW: July 28, 2023
- Genres: Adventure, eroge, visual novel
- Mode: Single-player

Kara no Shōjo (Japanese: 殻ノ少女; lit. "Girl in the Shell") is an adult visual novel/adventure game video game by Innocent Grey for Windows. It was released in Japan on July 4, 2008, and by MangaGamer (with the assistance of the TLWiki) for English-speaking markets on June 29, 2011. An HD remastered version of the game was announced by Shiravune on May 21, 2023, set to feature new English and Chinese translations handled by a completely new team. It was released under the title The Shell Part I: Inferno the same year.

Two sequels were later released. For the Shiravune releases, they were re-titled as The Shell Part II: Purgatorio and The Shell Part III: Paradiso.

== Gameplay ==
Kara no Shōjo's gameplay primarily revolves around reading dialogue with other characters and making choices that affect the outcome of the game.

At certain points in the game the player character, Reiji, is tasked with investigating crime scenes. During these investigation sequences, the player must examine these scenes to uncover evidence and depending on the evidence found, the course of the game can change. After collecting evidence, the player must put it together during inference sequences, in which Reiji must find the best answer from the clues obtained before and answer questions about the case. It is possible, however, to fail an inference sequence by missing a given piece of evidence during a prior investigation; this in turn affects the game's ending.

The game also features a travel system, through which the player can traverse between different locations in Tokyo. The player can only use this a limited number of times per day, and only on certain days.

== Plot ==
Set in a post-World War II Japan during 1956, Kara no Shōjo's story revolves around Reiji Tokisaka (時坂玲人, Tokisaka Reiji), a private investigator who is investigating a series of grotesque murders on the request of his former colleague/best friend, Kyozo Uozumi (魚住夾三, Uozumi Kyōzo) of the Tokyo metropolitan police force. The murders are reminiscent of another string of serial murders that occurred six years ago prior to the game where Reiji lost his fiancée, which drives him with a strong desire to solve this case. Later at a park, Reiji also meets a high school girl from Ouba Girls Academy named Touko Kuchiki (朽木冬子, Kuchiki Tōko), who asks him to find her real self. Reiji is initially unsure of what she means, but later finds out that Toko has an unusually complicated past that may have more to do with the current string of serial killings than Reiji initially expects. While working to solve the growing number of murder cases in Tokyo, Reiji takes some time out to get to know Toko and her friends as well as other students from her school while working behind-the-scenes to unravel the mysteries of her dark past.

== Characters ==
Reiji Tokisaka (時坂 玲人, Tokisaka Reiji)
Voiced by: Ryota Takeuchi (visual novel - full voice HD edition), Junichi Suwabe (OVA)
Reiji is the series' main protagonist and a private detective specializing in particularly brutal murder cases. Before the series of events, Reiji worked in the police force but then he was forced to quit after the death of his fiancée Yukiko; he lives with his younger sister Yukari (a student at Ouba Academy) who he cares for dearly and wants to make sure that nothing bad happens to her. He doesn't spend too much of his time at home due to his work unless he's off duty; he enjoys reading history books during his free time, even when he's in his office. He also becomes a substitute teacher teaching history at the same school that his sister attends.

Yukari Tokisaka (時坂 紫, Tokisaka Yukari)
Voiced by: Kei Mizusawa
Yukari is Reiji's younger sister and a high school student at the all-girls Ouba Academy. An old-fashioned, reliable type of girl, she is very close to her older brother and often takes care of him even when he tends to be helpless when it comes to doing household chores and will usually become concerned and worried when her brother has to go out and solve certain cases. Like Reiji she is very academic, but she has strong interests in entomology (much to the dismay of some people including her brother) and has a huge collection of certain insects in her bedroom. She is a member of her school's art club.

Toko Kuchiki (朽木 冬子, Kuchiki Tōko)
Voiced by: Kei Maeda
Toko Kuchiki is a mysterious teenage girl who meets Reiji with a request that he help her find her "true self". Like Yukari, she attends Ouba Girls Academy along with being one of her classmates and also a member of the art club at her school; despite being one of the most popular students at school, she actually hides some secrets that no one else knows. She is shown to be a regular customer at Cafe Moon World, a restaurant/bar owned by Kyoko (a widow whose husband died long before the series events).

Toko Mizuhara (水原 透子, Mizuhara Tōko)
Voiced by: Mimi Yoshida
Toko Mizuhara is Kuchiki's best friend and classmate from school. Sharing the same name as each other (but spelled differently), the two girls are often shown spending time and hanging out together. Due to her poor background and having to live in a broken home, she is shown to have a severe inferiority complex, because of this she hates her parents, herself, as well as other people around her. Like most of the people from her school, she practically worships Kuchiki especially since she has been one of the few people that ignores her troubled background. Since her first encounter with Reiji during a school field trip, she holds a strong grudge against him fearing that he's trying to take her friend away.

Tsuzuriko "Tojiko" Yosomiya (四十宮 "トージコ" 綴子, Yosomiya "Tojiko" Tsuzuriko)
Voiced by: Hinata Aoi
Tsuzuriko is an aspiring writer and one of Yukari's classmates/best friend from school who serves as a comic relief in both the OVA and visual novel. She possesses a bright and hyperactive personality and has published multiple stories in many well-known literary magazines while keeping her writing career a secret from her school. She is often referred to as "Tojiko" by Reiji claiming that her real name is hard to pronounce, much to her dismay.

Orihime Tsukishima (月島 織姫, Tsukishima Orihime)
Voiced by: Rino Kawashima (visual novel)
Orihime is the president of the student council at Ouba Academy. A talented honor student, she comes from a wealthy, loving, and influential family; her charisma makes her an idol of many of her classmates.

Kyozo Uozumi (魚住 夾三, Uozumi Kyouzou)
Voiced by: Jun Ozaki
Reiji's best friend and former colleague from the police, Kyozo and Reiji have known each other since they were students at the police academy where they both joined the force and worked under the same supervisor. Even after his friend resigned from the police force, he still relies on Reiji's help in solving cases. He is also a regular customer at Cafe Moon World and has a crush on the owner, Kyouko.

Kyoko Hazuki (葉月 杏子, Hazuki Kyouko)
Voiced by: Shiho Kawaragi
The widowed owner of Cafe Moon World and a close acquaintance of Reiji and Uozumi (two of her regular customers), Kyoko is one of the few people who remembers Reiji's dark tragic past and she was also an old friend of his deceased fiancée. Since they have both lost someone important and special to them, they are able to connect on a more different level. Her cafe has a lot of regulars including Uozumi and Toko Kuchiki.

Hatsune Amemiya (雨宮 初音, Amemiya Hatsune)
Voiced by: Himeno Miyabi
Hatsune is a waitress working at Cafe Moon World who used to help out at a brothel entitled Yukishiro, but after the establishment was shut down, Madam Ujaku took Hatsune under her wing and gave her the name Amemiya. She learned how to write from Shugo when they both lived at the Yukishiro brothel, so she gets mad whenever people say bad things about him.

Shinji Mamiya (マミヤ 真司, Mamiya Shinji)
Voiced by: Daisuke Yagami
Shinji, also known by his pen name Shin Katsuragi (葛城 シン, Katsuragi Shin) or Katsuragi-sensei for short, is one of the series' main antagonists. He is shown to be a famous well-known novelist and author of Shell of Sheol, one of his most popular published books. Unknown to most people, he is secretly a serial killer.

Nene Akazaki (朱崎 寧々, Akazaki Nene)
Voiced by: Nao Hamura
A school nurse at Ouba Girls Academy.

Chizuru Kuchiki (朽木 千鶴, Kuchiki Chizuru)
Voiced by: Yuka Nishiguchi
Touko's frail mother, she is often very gloomy and quiet type of person who often devotes all her time to her household duties.

Fumiya Kuchiki (朽木 文弥, Kuchiki Fumiya)
Voiced by: Masahiro Okazaki
Touko's calm and friendly uncle, he deeply cares a lot for his niece as she is the most precious person to him.

Yasutada Kuchiki (朽木 靖匡, Kuchiki Yasutada)
Voiced by: Kouta Umanami
Touko's grandfather who seems to be a very grumpy fellow most of the time, he is also the chief physician of a local hospital.

Tatsuhiko Kusaka (日下 達彦, Kusaka Tatsuhiko)
Voiced by: Daichi Hirono
Tatsuhiko is a homeroom teacher at Ouba Academy and a highly unassuming person who doesn't stand out very much. He often advises Reiji that the school rules do not allow for much interaction between siblings, but he does appear to sympathize with Reiji as he struggles to deal with the seemingly emotionless students who lack any trace of individuality.

Maris Stella (マリス・ステラ, Marisu Sutera)
Voiced by: Yuzuki Akishiro
Maris is a half-Japanese friend of Reiji's who works as a tour guide at the art museum that Reiji and the students visit during a school field trip.

Mio Mizuhara (水原 未央, Mizuhara Mio)
Voiced by: Kei Kusamura

Yorutsuki Mori (森 夜月, Mori Yorutsuki)
Voiced by: Jin Munakata

Naoki Murase (村瀬 直己, Murase Naoki)
Voiced by: Daichi Hirono

Tokio Saeki (佐伯 時生, Saeki Tokio)
Voiced by: Kouta Umanami
The vice principal of Ouba Girls Academy as well as the faculty advisor to the art club, he hires Reiji to search for the missing students at his school and pleads with him to investigate school grounds to prevent any more casualties.

Tamaki Saito (西藤 環, Saito Tamaki)
Voiced by: Tomoaki Ikeda
A psychiatrist at the hospital owned by the Kuchiki family.

Ayumu Sato (佐東 歩, Satou Ayumu)
Voiced by: Shiho Kawaragi
Yui's best friend and classmate, she runs into Yukari and the rest of the art club members a lot. She became rather depressed after her friend's disappearance, and as a result, doesn't talk to others as much as she used to.

Natsume Takashiro (高城 夏目, Takashiro Natsume)
Voiced by: Ryoko Tanaka
Takashiro is a coroner who forbids anyone to address her as anything but "Natsume-san". Though she can be rather shady with her words and actions, her skill as a coroner is undisputed. Reiji met her during his time on the force and still relies on her for important information, but he tries to stay away from her as much as possible, as she tends to require "something" in exchange for information.

Shugo Takashiro (高城 秋五, Takashiro Shuugo)
Voiced by: Tooru Kishiri
A private detective based in Ueno, he used to work with Reiji and Uozumi and still helps out his friends when needed. Married to Kazuna, a former client with whom he shares a lot of history. Since she is currently pregnant, Shugo focuses on less dangerous tasks like investigating cheating spouses and searching for people in order to worry her less.

Ryoichi Yaginuma (八木沼 了一, Yaginuma Ryouichi)
Voiced by: Tomotaka Harada
Ryoichi is a police officer who was part of the investigation team for the Ueno's serial killer and murder mystery. After the case was solved, he was transferred and promoted to becoming a police officer of the National Police Agency in the Kara no Shoujo series.

Koharu Yamanouchi (山ノ内 小春, Yamanouchi Koharu)
Voiced by: Mitsu Takashiro
Koharu is an obstetrician at the Kuchiki Pathological Research Institute. A gentle person with a serious demeanor who likes taking care of people, she helps out during Reiji's investigation. Due to the small amount of doctors they have available, she often has to help with things other than her actual field of obstetrics.

Yui Nishizono (西園 唯, Nishizono Yui)
Voiced by: Ryou Kasumi
A junior student of Yukari and Touko and best friends with Ayumu, she is revealed to be one of the missing students from the academy.

Kazuna Takashiro (高城 和菜, Takashiro Kazuna)
Voiced by: Yuzuki Akishiro
A famous well-known stage actress, she went through a horrific past but then settled down and married Shugo. She seems to be comparatively more calm and mature after getting married. Due to her pregnancy, she is currently taking a break. Though she stays at home most of the time, she will occasionally stop by Shugo's office from time to time to see to his needs.

Yukiko Miyama (深山 由紀子, Miyama Yukiko)
Reiji's late fiancée who was murdered by Makoto Rokushiki long before the series events.

== Development ==
Kara no Shōjo is developed by Innocent Grey. The original concept was by Miki Sugina.

An audition for the voice roles of five of the main female characters of Kara no Shojo was held in January 2008. 254 applicants attended the audition.

A sequel to Kara no Shōjo by Innocent Grey was released on February 8, 2013. The final installment Kara no Shōjo: The Last Episode (天ノ少女, Ama no Shōjo) was released in Japan on 25 December 2020.

== Release history ==
Kara no Shōjo released its first demo on May 4, 2008 and later a full version on July 4. Pre-orders of the game came with a unique special packaging and an illustration book spanning 82 pages.

An English-language version of Kara no Shōjo was released on June 29, 2011, in a collaboration between MangaGamer and tlwiki. The game can be purchased and downloaded from the MangaGamer website and Steam. MangaGamer released Kara no Shoujo: The Second Episode in English on October 30, 2015.

A HD remaster of the first game was released in Japan on December 20, 2019. It was later released in English and Chinese by Shiravune under the title The Shell Part I: Inferno on July 28, 2023, with the other titles in the trilogy at a later date. These include a new translation directed by John Hooper, unique from the MangaGamer one.

== Music ==
The music for the game is composed Manyo. The opening theme to Kara no Shōjo, named "Ruri no Tori" (瑠璃の鳥 lit. Azure Bird), was performed by Haruka Shimotsuki. The soundtrack for the game, named Azure, was released on the same day as the game on July 4, 2008.

== Reception ==
During the month of June 2008, one month before Kara no Shōjo's release on July 4, 2008, Kara no Shōjo ranked sixth in national PC game pre-orders in Japan.

== Adaptations ==
A two episode hentai OVA based on the game was made by MS pictures and released in 2010.

An American, independent international media distributor Media Blasters released an English dubbed production of the OVA on February 28, 2023, on Blu-ray and DVD in their uncut, uncensored format.
