= The House in Fata Morgana =

Visual novel video game

- Developer: Novectacle
- Publishers: JP: Novectacle; JP: FuRyu (3DS); JP: Dramatic Create (PS Vita); WW: MangaGamer (PC); NA: Mighty Rabbit Studios (digital PS4/PS Vita); NA: Limited Run Games (physical PS4/PS Vita/Switch)
- Artist: Moyataro
- Writer: Keika Hanada
- Composers: Mellok'n; Gao; Yusuke Tsutsumi; Takaki Moriya; Aikawa Razuna
- Platforms: Microsoft Windows, iOS, Nintendo 3DS, PlayStation Vita, PlayStation 4, Nintendo Switch
- Release: Microsoft Windows: JP: December 31, 2012; WW: May 13, 2016; iOS: JP: May 16, 2014; Nintendo 3DS: JP: July 27, 2016; PlayStation Vita: JP: March 16, 2017; NA: May 28, 2019; PlayStation 4: NA: June 11, 2019; Nintendo Switch: JP: March 25, 2021; NA: April 9, 2021
- Genre: Visual novel
- Mode: Single-player

The House in Fata Morgana (Note: The House in Fata Morgana (Japanese: ファタモルガーナの館, Hepburn: Fata Morugāna no Yakata)) is a visual novel video game developed by Novectacle. It was released for Microsoft Windows and iOS by Novectacle in 2012 and 2014 in Japan, and for Microsoft Windows by MangaGamer in 2016 internationally. Additionally, a Nintendo 3DS version was released by FuRyu in 2016, and a PlayStation Vita version was released by Dramatic Create in 2017, both exclusive to Japan. Another PlayStation Vita version, as well as a PlayStation 4 version, were released in North America by Limited Run Games in 2019, who also released a Nintendo Switch version of the game in 2021.

The House in Fata Morgana is set in a mansion, where a spirit appears with amnesia. It meets a Maid in the mansion, and the two view the mansion's past in different time periods – 1603, 1707, 1869 and 1099 – to learn what has happened to its residents and to try to get the spirit to regain its lost memories.

== Plot ==
An amnesiac spirit awakens in an ethereal mansion. In order to recover lost memories, the spirit explores the mansion's past with a Maid, whose appearance remains unchanged over time.

In 1603, the mansion is inhabited by young aristocrat siblings Mell and Nellie Rhodes. Mell becomes smitten with a mysterious White-Haired Girl, and the two begin a relationship. Nellie is driven mad with jealousy and discovers that the White-Haired Girl is her and Mell's half-sister. Nellie reveals this to Mell, as well as her own romantic feelings for him, leaving him distraught.

In 1707, the mansion is abandoned and destitute. The Maid, the mansion's only inhabitant, discovers Yukimasa, an amnesiac man, in the cellar. However, he visualizes himself as a savage beast named "Bestia." The Maid tries to civilize him, but he murders villagers that come to the mansion in retaliation for abuse he received from them. Later, a reincarnation of the White-Haired Girl, who retains hazy memories of her past life, arrives. Yukimasa attempts to kill her, but her lack of fear stupefies him, and the two become friends. Meanwhile, Pauline, Yukimasa's lover, searches for him. She finds the mansion, but Yukimasa, who sees Pauline as another Bestia, kills her in his confusion. Later, villagers attack the mansion, and the White-Haired Girl dies. Yukimasa slaughters all of the villagers.

In 1869, the mansion is owned by young, greedy businessman Jacopo. He lives with his wife, another reincarnation of the White-Haired Girl, and many servants, including the Maid and his childhood friend Maria. Maria, secretly despising Jacopo, sabotages his relationship with the White-Haired Girl, causing her to eventually flee. Realizing the truth, Jacopo confronts Maria, who dies when they exchange gunfire. Jacopo spends the rest of his life unsuccessfully searching for the White-Haired Girl.

In 1099, an incarnation of the White-Haired Girl flees to the mansion from persecuting villagers. She meets Michel, a hermit living in the mansion. The two fall in love, and the White-Haired Girl reveals her name: Giselle. Villagers attack the mansion, and Michel sacrifices himself to kill them. As Giselle grieves, she is spoken to by the disembodied voice of Morgana, a witch who offers to reincarnate Giselle so she may one day reunite with Michel's reincarnation, which Giselle accepts.

The Maid claims that she is Morgana and the spirit is the White-Haired Girl. However, the spirit recalls his true identity as Michel and deduces that the previous story was falsified and that the Maid is actually Giselle. In reality, Giselle was another young woman who was repeatedly raped by her employer, Antonin. Giselle was to be executed, but Antonin instead banished her to the mansion where Michel, his son, lived. The two become friends, eventually falling in love. After Antonin dies, knights attack the manor. Michel leaves Giselle safely locked away while he is killed, his corpse being dragged away.

The disembodied voice of Morgana offers to reincarnate Michel, which Giselle accepts. After Morgana curses Giselle so that she no longer ages, Giselle waits for hundreds of years, eventually donning the Maid's garb per Morgana's recommendation. Eventually Mell's family moves into the house, followed by the White-Haired Girl. Her memories hazy, Giselle believes that the White-Haired Girl, her actual name being Michelle, is Michel's reincarnation, but Michelle doesn't remember her. Giselle becomes emotionally numb, watching the mansion's tragedies unfold with little reaction until Morgana convinces her that she's always been the Maid and that her past memories aren't real.

The Maid, having regained her memories and personality as Giselle, is suddenly dragged away by Morgana, who reveals her past. As a child, her mother sold her to a lord who mutilated her to extract her supposedly-medicinal blood. She was freed in a slave uprising and cared for at a brothel, but bandits abducted Morgana. A swordsman killed their captors and fellow captives alike, sparing only Morgana. Morgana lived in a cottage until a boy requested she heal his sick sister. After Morgana donated blood multiple times, the boy came to the cottage with the swordsman, who severed her arm. She was brought to the lord, who imprisoned her in an observation tower. Upon her death, Morgana's spirit lingered on, cursing the three men.

Michel's past is then revealed: known as a child as "Michelle", he was assigned female at birth. Puberty caused his voice to deepen and his body to become more masculine, and he renamed himself "Michel," asserting that he had always been male. However, his mother considered him cursed and locked him in his room for two years until he could be "cured". He was freed by his brothers Didier and Georges who sent him to safely live in the mansion until they could welcome him back. Upon his father's death, Michel had written to his mother requesting her acceptance of him as a man. She then sent the knights to claim Michel's life, with Didier leading the procession.

Morgana mocks Michel for reincarnating into the White-Haired Girl (thus proving him female), as well as his inability to remember Giselle in his other lives. Giselle appears and accepts Michel for who he is, confident that the White-Haired Girl was not Michel. Encouraged by Giselle, Michel travels to the distant past when Morgana was alive to try to save her from her fate. Michel convinces the "boy" and the "swordsman", past incarnations of Mell and Yukimasa, to free Morgana. The "lord", the past Jacopo, was not be the same man who mutilated Morgana but instead a slave who had saved and cared for Morgana, having fallen in love with her before becoming the new lord. Jacopo agrees to free Morgana, but when the men climb the tower, they find her on the verge of death. Michel comforts her as she dies, but when he attempts to leave the mansion with her body, events play out as they originally had; Michel was not changing the past, but merely reliving it.

Back in the mansion, Michel meets the White-Haired Girl, who is the self-sacrificing half of Morgana's soul who had modeled her appearance and name after Michel out of admiration. At her insistent request, Michel destroys her, allowing Morgana's soul to become whole again. Now knowing the reasons behind the three men's actions, Morgana frees their spirits despite not forgiving them. Michel also finds Georges' soul, but as they and Morgana go to leave the mansion, Didier's soul blocks their path. Georges blocks a fatal blow before Michel brings Didier to his senses and helps him pass on. Michel, Morgana and Giselle leave the dissipating mansion.

In 2009 Europe, reincarnations of Mell, Nellie, Yukimasa, Pauline, Jacopo, Maria and Morgana are living ordinary lives. Giselle and Michel's reincarnations, having both retained their memories, reunite where the mansion once stood.

== Development ==
The game was developed by Novectacle and written by Keika Hanada, with art by Moyataro. The developers did not specifically target men or women with the game, and instead just intended to make a game for players who enjoy stories. Hanada spent more than a year planning the story, which was influenced by Tanith Lee's books, and the films Millennium Actress (2001) and The Best of Youth (2003). To keep the text from distracting the player, it was mostly written in modern Japanese, with only little use of archaic speech. To make the game feel unique, Moyataro made use of heavy coloring and shading, to portray a "more realistic kind of beauty" compared to the "cutesy" anime-like artstyle common in Japanese visual novels. Another important aspect in making the game feel unique was its music: more than half of the songs are vocal tracks, intended to make the game feel like visiting a theatre with someone singing in the background. Five composers worked on the music, and wrote 65 different tracks.

In June 2013, the game distribution platform Playism announced that they were interested in localizing the game for English-speaking audiences, as they wanted to bring visual novels to their platform and felt The House in Fata Morgana might be a good place for them to start. They encouraged people to tell them if they were interested in the game, to gauge demand for it. Two days later, they clarified that monetary issues were what caused them to not start localization work right away: Novectacle, being an indie developer, were unable to pay upfront for the localization work. Instead, Novectacle proposed that all revenue from Japanese The House in Fata Morgana sales would go to paying for the localization. As the Japanese sales on the Playism platform were much too low to finance the localization, Playism considered either waiting and seeing if Japanese sales would pick up pace, or launching a crowdfunding campaign. Playism was still working towards a localization in late March 2014, when they released a localized demo. During the Otakon convention in August 2014, the visual novel publisher MangaGamer announced that they had acquired the license to publish the game.

Due to the large range of cultures and time periods appearing in the game, it was important to MangaGamer to decide on a localization strategy early on to avoid an inconsistent script; translator BlackDragonHunt said that making language in historical settings appear authentic was a difficult balancing act, with too modern dialogue breaking immersion, and older English being difficult for modern readers to understand. They decided to follow the same style as the Japanese original, mainly using modern language, with some use of words based on the various time periods and regions in the game to give it a "historical flavor": for instance, the word "bedroom" was replaced with "bedchamber", and "maid" with "abigail".

== Release and reception ==
Reception

Aggregate score
Aggregator	Score
Metacritic	NS: 96/100

The game was originally released for Microsoft Windows on December 31, 2012 in Japan; this version was also released through Playism on May 31, 2013 in Japan. A Japanese iOS version followed on May 16, 2014. MangaGamer released the Microsoft Windows version in English on May 13, 2016, both separately and in a bundle with the game's soundtrack. A Nintendo 3DS version was released digitally in Japan on July 27, 2016 by FuRyu, as one of the first three games of their Catalyst line, and a PlayStation Vita version was released both physically and digitally in Japan on March 16, 2017 by Dramatic Create. This version includes new content; due to sickness, Moyataro was unable to create the new artwork needed for it, so another illustrator was given the task.

Limited Run Games released the game in North America for PlayStation Vita on May 28, 2019, and released it for PlayStation 4 on June 11, under the title The House in Fata Morgana: Dreams of the Revenants Edition; their PlayStation 4 version uses newer artwork as it was the first time the game was available in 4K resolution. They have also released physical versions for both platforms. This version of the game was also released on the Nintendo Switch on April 9, 2021, with a version for Japanese audiences released on March 25, 2021.

The game was a runner-up for Hardcore Gamer's Best Story of 2016 award.

The Steam release had an estimated total of 8,500 players by July 2018.

== Other media ==
A manga adaptation of the game, The House in Fata Morgana: Anata no Hitomi o Tozasu Monogatari, (Note: The House in Fata Morgana: Anata no Hitomi o Tozasu Monogatari (ファタモルガーナの館 あなたの瞳を閉ざす物語)) was written by Hanada and drawn by Kanemune. It was published by Akita Shoten in four volumes from 2015 to 2017, of which the last three were released digitally. The manga has been licensed for release by Sekai Project, who released it digitally: the first volume was released November 2017, and the second February 2018.

On March 14, 2025, it was announced that a live-action adaptation from a North American director is in development.
