= Absolute Field =

Chinese anime and manga publication

- Native name: 绝对领域
- Categories: Anime and manga magazine
- Format: Disk magazine
- Publisher: Kaiming Wenjiao Yinxiang Chubanshe; Beijing Mandong Tiandi Wenhua Chuanmei Youxian Gongsi (开明文教音像出版社；北京漫动天地文化传媒有限公司)
- Company: Beijing Mandong Tiandi Wenhua Chuanmei Youxian Gongsi (北京漫动天地文化传媒有限公司)
- Country: China
- Language: Chinese

Absolute Field (Chinese: 绝对领域; pinyin: Juéduì lǐngyù, Chinese for zettai ryōiki) was a Chinese-language otaku publication that was publicly identified in 2013 as an illegal periodical.

According to a 2013 report in News Frontline (a periodical published by People's Daily), the National Office for the Fight Against Pornography and Illegal Publications of China placed Absolute Field on a blacklist of illegal publications. The magazine had been released using an audiovisual-products–only publication number rather than a valid periodical registration, rendering it unauthorized under Chinese publishing regulations.

== Historical background ==
During the early 2000s, otaku-culture magazines played a central role in disseminating Japanese animation and related media in China at a time when broadband access was limited and legal streaming platforms were virtually nonexistent. Print publications combined journalism with bundled optical discs, offering curated anime clips, music videos, and editorial video programming. This disc magazine format became a primary entry point into Japanese animation culture for a generation of readers.

== Regulatory Pressure and Decline ==
In September 2013, China's National Office Against Pornographic and Illegal Publications launched the nationwide "Autumn Wind" campaign, targeting unauthorized periodicals and improper use of publication numbers. As part of this enforcement action, several well-known otaku-oriented magazines were publicly listed as illegal publications, including Absolute Field and Anime New Type, both of which had been distributed using audiovisual-product publication numbers rather than valid periodical registrations.

National and local "anti–pornography and illegal publications" authorities conducted coordinated enforcement actions targeting publications deemed harmful to minors. Beijing authorities investigated and formally classified Absolute Field as an illegal publication. According to a report published by the Ministry of Education of China, the investigation followed public complaints alleging unhealthy content and explicit cover imagery.

The State Administration of Press, Publication, Radio, Film and Television and the Beijing cultural market enforcement authority imposed administrative penalties. These included a three-month suspension of operations and a fine of RMB 30,000 for the publisher Kaiming Cultural and Educational Audiovisual Publishing House, and a fine of RMB 239,364 with confiscation of RMB 18,000 in illegal income for Beijing Mandong Tiandi Culture Media Co., Ltd. Affiliated websites were also forced to shut down.

== Legacy ==
Despite their eventual disappearance, magazines such as Absolute Field are widely regarded as formative media within Chinese anime fandom. They contributed to the early systematization of anime criticism and consumption in mainland China and served as an entry point for many readers who later became creators, editors, or commentators within the broader ACG sphere.
