= Kirakira (video game) =

2007 video game

- Cover of the Kirakira visual novel

キラ☆キラ
- Genre: Music, Romance Drama
- Video game
- Developer: Overdrive
- Publisher: JP: Overdrive (Microsoft Windows) PrincessSoft (PlayStation 2); WW: MangaGamer
- Genre: Eroge, Visual novel
- Platform: Microsoft Windows, PlayStation 2, iPhone OS
- Released: JP: November 27, 2007 (Microsoft Windows) February 26, 2009 (PlayStation 2) November 20, 2009 (iPhone OS)
- Video game

Kirakira Curtain Call
- Developer: Overdrive
- Publisher: JP: Overdrive; WW: MangaGamer
- Genre: Eroge, Visual novel
- Platform: Microsoft Windows
- Released: JP: August 14, 2008; WW: April 29, 2010
- Manga
- Written by: Overdrive
- Illustrated by: Kiku Ueda
- Published by: Fujimi Shobo
- Magazine: Dragon Age Pure
- Original run: December 2007 – June 2008
- Volumes: 1

Kira☆Kira (キラ☆キラ; lit. "Sparkling") is a Japanese adult visual novel developed by OVERDRIVE and first released playable on a Microsoft Windows PC on November 27, 2007. An official English translation by MangaGamer was released in June 2009 only available via downloading on MangaGamer's website. A PlayStation 2 version published by PrincessSoft was released on February 26, 2009. A version of the game with all adult content removed was ported to the iPhone and iPod Touch by M-Trix Inc. and was released on the App Store on November 20, 2009. In addition, a sequel called Kira☆Kira Curtain Call (キラ☆キラ カーテンコール) was released by OVERDRIVE for the PC in August 2008.

== Plot ==
The protagonists of Kirakira, Shikanosuke, Kirari, Sarina and Chie are the members of the second literary club (第二文芸部, daini bungeibu) at the Christian school Ohbi Gakuen. The club was set to be closed in next March so they try to set up a band they call the Second Literary Club Band (第二文芸部バンド, Daini Bungeibu Bando; shortened to d2b) to save the club. Their performance at the subsequent school festival succeeds with flying colors. That performance was put on the Internet where one of the live houses in Nagoya offered the band to put on a performance in Nagoya. They honestly want to disband after the performance at the school festival because they had to study for entrance exams or look for jobs, but they were convinced to go on a live tour by Yagihara, the vocalist of Star Generation. Shikanosuke's band d2b begins its live tour across Japan in an old van.

== Characters ==
Note: Voice actresses for the three main heroines are for the PS2 version. The cast for the PC version is not announced (possibly due to it being an adult game).

=== d2b band ===
Shikanosuke Maejima (前島 鹿之助, Maejima Shikanosuke)
Shikanosuke is the protagonist of Kirakira. He used to be in the tennis club with his best friend, Murakami. In the beginning of the story, he gets dumped by his girlfriend and quits the tennis club due to health problems. In the d2b (second literature club) band, he joins as Shikako Maejima, a red-headed girl with hearing problems. This way they can try to become an all-girls band. He plays a Fender-styled bass guitar in the band. Throughout the Sarina and Chie Route, he revealed that his biological father died when he was 5 and his current father is not his real father. However, he respects him a lot for raising him until this day.

Kirari Shiino (椎野 きらり, Shiino Kirari)
Voiced by: Tomoko Nakamura
Kirari is the girl who Shikanosuke meets at a sake bar where he works as a part time worker. Since her house is very poor, she works many jobs to help her family. She is a cheerful character who initially wants to play drums in the band, but is persuaded by Chie to become the vocalist. She is the band's vocalist and second guitarist, using a Gibson Les Paul Junior. She has special talents and an extraordinary memory, and seems to be attending the high school under an academic scholarship. She has a voice which people describe as genius, but her huge vocabulary causes her trouble when carrying on normal conversation with others. She also comes across a bit of an oddball to the other students, so she doesn't have many friends. She admits she would go out with Shikanosuke before the tour during the fireworks display during the festival. In her route (normal), because of poverty and a loan shark, she is forced to drop out of school and interviews for a job in the adult industry (arranged by the loan shark).
In the Normal Ending, her father starts a fire on her house because he cannot stand the burden of debt anymore, leading to Kirari's death at the end of chapter 3. This leads to Shikanosuke's traumatic breakdown, resulting in his failing an entrance exam and later joining his friend's band, the Happy Cycle Mania. In the end of chapter 4, he overcomes his sadness and composes a song from Kirari's humming voice on the cassette tape she left in her bag the day her house burned.
In the True End (after viewing the 3 heroines' normal ends), instead of going home after meeting with Kirari at her house, Shikanosuke forcefully makes her tell him the truth about where she will be working. However, he is unable to solve her family problems and depressed, breaks up with her. This break-up scene is seen by her father, who tries to commit suicide but fails, and is brought to the hospital, where he calls in Shikanosuke to talk. Her father cuts his wrist at the hospital, but Shikanosuke decides not to call the doctor and lets him die. After his death, the family debt is lifted, but Shikanosuke still feels guilty because of his decision. In the end, Kirari states that she wants to be in relationship with him and forgives him after he confesses his role in her father's death. In the Epilogue, she becomes a famous singer while still dating Shikanosuke who is in college and they are doing fine.

Kirari's singing voice is provided by UR@N.

Sarina Kashiwara (樫原 紗理奈, Kashiwara Sarina)
Voiced by: Megumi Kojima
Sarina was born into a bourgeoisie family, is well mannered and very lady-like but she sometimes shows her stubbornness. She always rides a Rolls-Royce Phantom to school from her house. She does not have many friends at school, but she and Kirari are best friends. She is the band's lead guitarist, using a red Gibson SG with floral decorations.
In her route, her grandfather decides not to let her go to school anymore after the tour. She admits her love with Shikanosuke when they were at the beach and later he responds to her through cellphone because she was in her house in the countryside. Shikanosuke goes to her house in order to persuade her grandfather with the help of her uncle, brother of her father and they discover the secret about her father in the past, who also love rock music (her guitar was her father's). Although Sarina did not go back to Tokyo with him in the end, he was able to convince her grandfather about their relationship, with the proof that he wants him to come back in Fall.

Chie Isurugi (石動 千絵, Isurugi Chie)
Voiced by: Kei Mizusawa
Chie is Shikanosuke's childhood friend who is one year older than he is. For personal reasons, she was held back one grade so she is in same grade with Shikanosuke, Kirari, and Sarina. The leader of d2b, she seems to be a strict and honest person but also admonishes herself and is also carefree and cowardly. She is the drummer of the band, and before she received a drumset from Kenta, she practiced with a bucket, silver tub and magazines.
In her route, She admits her love for Shikanosuke since they were young, even when he had a girlfriend, she still did not give up. It is revealed that her father's lover was pregnant. Her mother cannot take it and takes it to court, which affected her and her sisters' education. However, in the end, she forgives her father and her father's lover with the help of Shikanosuke and is looking forward to seeing her half-brother.

=== Supporting characters ===
Kenta Tonoya (殿谷 健太, Tonoya Kenta)
Voiced by: Yūki Tai
Kenta is Shikanosuke's classmate. He is the guitarist of the well-known band Star Generation in Kirakira, and also coaches d2b. He tends to be frank and cold, but he is passionate when he is talking about music. He holds a Fender Stratocaster. Chie gave him the nickname "Tonoyan". Shikanosuke called him "poker face."

Murakami (村上)
Voiced by: Kenji Hamada
Murakami is Shikanosuke's friend and his former partner when he played doubles in the tennis club. He is big and macho but easily gets sentimental. His family owns the alcohol business Murakami Liquor, and he is always seen wearing Murakami Liquor T-shirts. He likes to join in on Go games, and is also in the Go club. While he could not join d2b, he teaches the d2b members about what punk rock is. In Curtain Call, he forms Happy Cycle Mania and is the guitarist.

Yagihara (八木原)
Voiced by: Haruo Satou
Yagihara is the leader and main vocalist of Star Generation. He discovered d2b's ability and supports them.

Miyuki & Mai (美雪&舞)
Voiced by: Yuka Nishiguchi & Chizuru Matsuyuki
Miyuki and Mai are members of the second literary club who purposely don't specify who is who so nobody can tell them apart. When Shinosuke asks who is who, they call him a pervert. They make d2b's band uniforms.

Sister Yoshizawa (吉沢)
Voiced by: Harumi Asai
Sister Yoshizawa is a teacher at Ohbi Gakuen. While she seems strict, she is an understanding woman.

Yuko Maejima (前島 祐子, Maejima Yūko)
Yuko is the younger sister of Shikanosuke. She follows her brother's footsteps and becomes the bassist of d2b in Curtain Call.

Masatsugu Kashiwara (樫原 正次, Kashiwara Masatsugu)
Voiced by: Katsuhisa Houki
Masatsugu is Sarina's grandfather and also CEO/COO of Kashiwara holdings. He is very stern and he thinks it is not good that Sarina joins the d2b band.

Saiki (斎木)
Voiced by: Hikaru Tokita
Saiki is a maid in the Kashiwara household. She is compliant to Masatsugu.

Akira Yashiro (屋代 彰, Yashiro Akira)
Akira is the vocalist of the Visual kei band Panic in Nagoya. He blames Shikanosuke for his cross-dressing. Akira later becomes a guitarist for Happy Cycle Mania.

Mika (美佳)
Mika is Akira's girlfriend who is also living with him.

Tomo Kougure (古暮 智, Kogure Tomo)
Voiced by: Chiro Kanzaki
Tomo is the proxy booking manager at Livehouse in Osaka. Although she already had a boyfriend, she still tried to seduce Shikanosuke when they were alone in the theatre.

Satoh (佐藤, Satō)
Satoh is some sort of yakuza that Kirari meets in Osaka, but he kindly gives a Gibson Les Paul Jr. to her. Kirari gives him the nickname "Satocchi".

== Development ==
Kirakira is the second visual novel production by OVERDRIVE after Edelweiss. The game's producer was Hiroshi "Bamboo" Takeuchi. The scenario was written by Renya Setoguchi, and this was the final work with him as a writer until Musicus. The character design and art direction was headed by Shinji Katakura who returned after his work on Edelweiss. The music was produced by the Japanese band Milktub which has Hiroshi Takeuchi as the main vocalist.

== Related media ==
=== Internet radio show ===
An Internet radio show entitled Radio d2b was produced by Onsen and was first released as a pre-broadcast in December 2007. The main broadcasting period of the show was between January and June 2008. The program was hosted by Hiroshi Takeuchi, UR@N and Kyoichi Miyazaki. A second season began in November 2008 hosted by Takeuchi, Tomoko Nakamura (voice of Kirari Shino), Megumi Kojima (voice of Sarina Kashiwara), and Kei Mizusawa (voice of Chie Isurugi).
